= Swansea Marina =

Marina in Swansea, Wales

Coordinates: 51°36′57.00″N 3°56′18.00″W

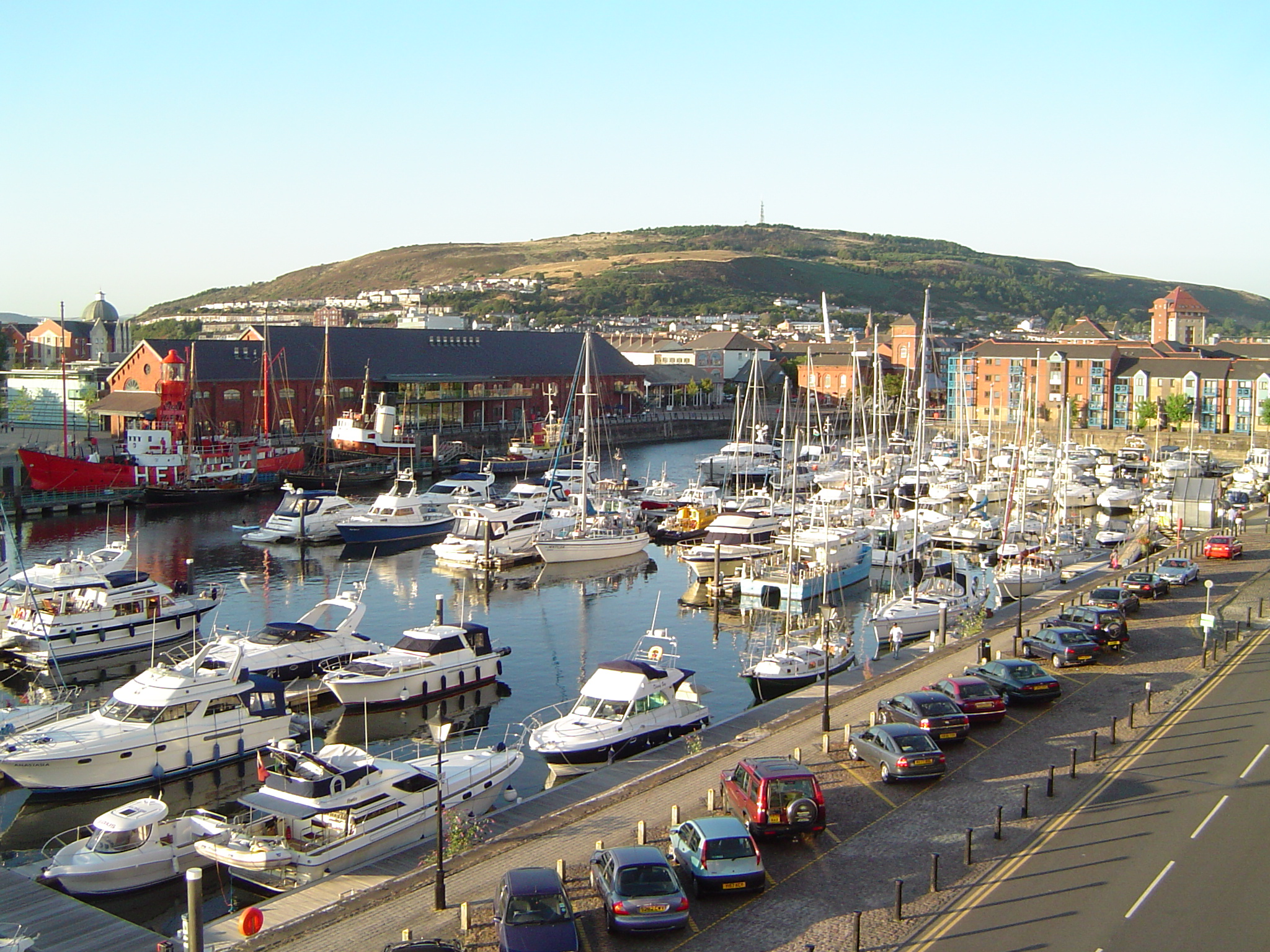
The South Dock area of the marina, taken from Trawler Road

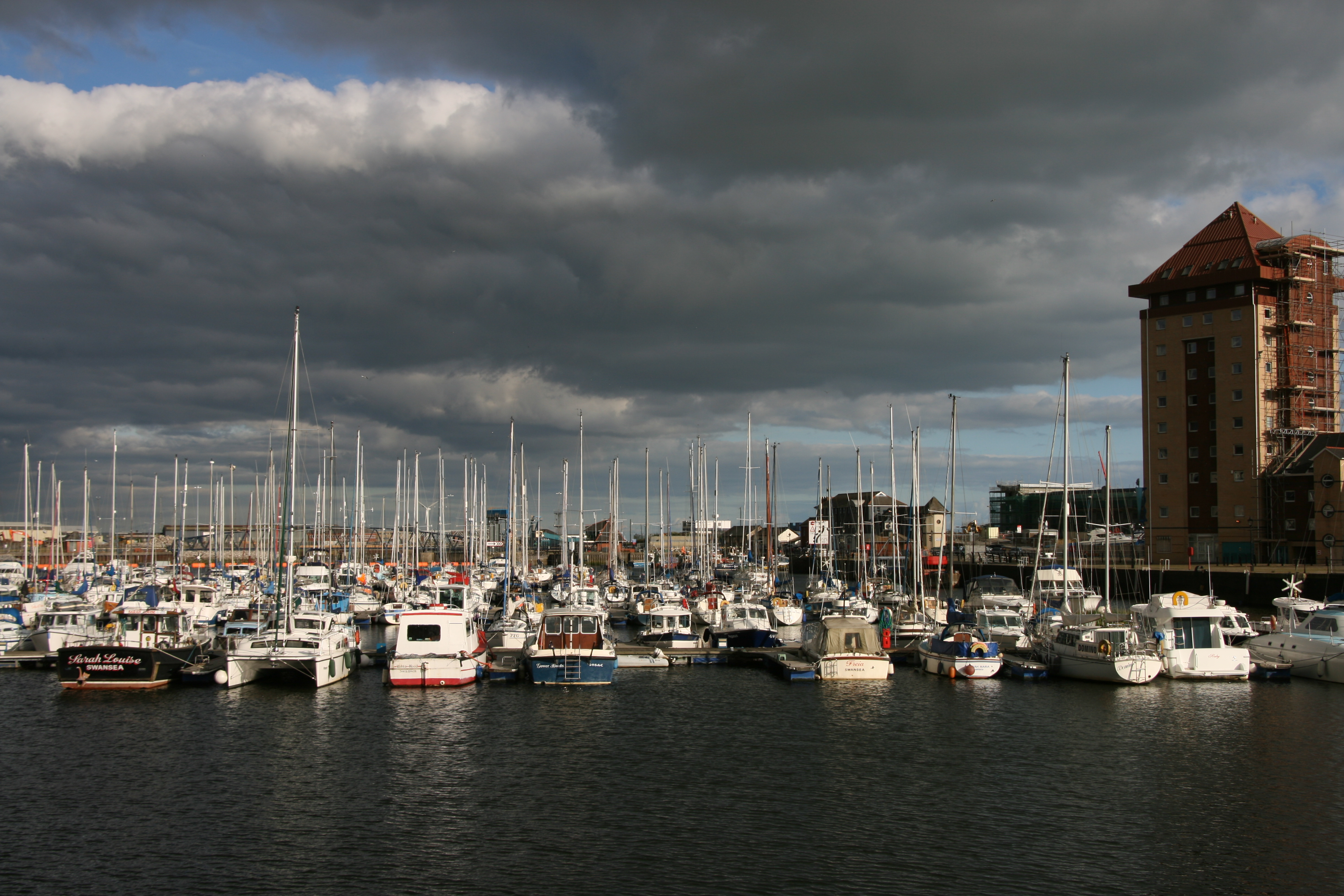
New berthing area just behind the River Tawe barrage; Pocketts Wharf building is visible to the right

Swansea Marina is a marina in Swansea, south Wales, behind the barrage at the mouth of the River Tawe. There is a boatyard for building and servicing boats, and a few shops selling boating equipment.

== History ==
After many years of industrial decline in the Lower Swansea valley, the South Dock of the Swansea Docks complex finally closed in 1969, leaving the area as an industrial wasteland which was sold to the council. Initially, a new relief road was proposed to take traffic away from the Oystermouth road. However, there was a government reorganisation in 1974 which decided on a new strategy. By 1975, a new planning strategy had been prepared which identified social and economic policy objectives with a new regeneration programme.

It took a further five years for land acquisition, clearance and infrastructure installation before redevelopment could commence. New sea defence works were installed, the dock basin had to be cleared of debris and new moorings needed to be installed for the marina. More efficient modern lock gates were fitted, along with a new swing bridge, and the quaysides were paved to create a public walkway around the dockside.

The yacht marina was opened in 1982, providing berths for 385 boats. It was not until 1992 that the Swansea barrage was completed, transforming the River Tawe into long lake. Additional berths were constructed behind the barrage, just outside the marina proper, providing berthing for an additional 200 boats. A lock was incorporated into the barrage design to allow the passage of boats between the River Tawe system and the sea.

== Maritime museum ==
Swansea Museum displays some of its maritime collection at the marina, including:

- Lightship 91 Helwick
- Steam tug Canning
