= Swansea Canal =

Canal in Wales

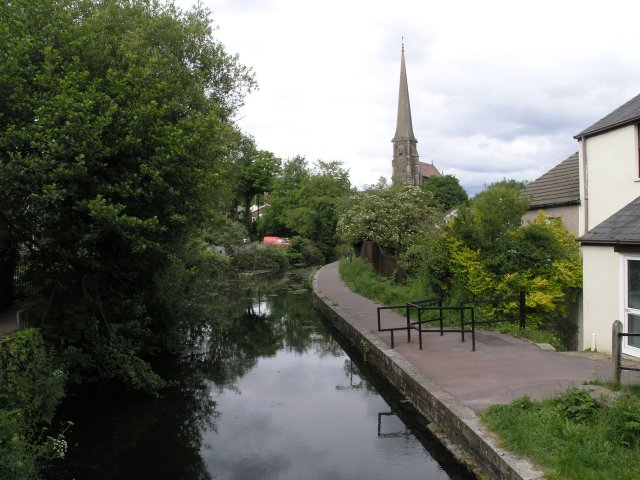
- The canal at Pontardawe
- Interactive map of Swansea Canal

Specifications
- Maximum boat length: 65 ft 0 in (19.81 m)
- Maximum boat beam: 7 ft 6 in (2.29 m)
- Locks: 6 (originally 36)
- Status: Restoration proposed
- Navigation authority: Canal and River Trust

History
- Original owner: Swansea Canal Company
- Principal engineer: Charles Roberts
- Other engineer: Thomas Sheasby
- Date of act: 1794
- Date completed: 1798
- Date closed: 1931

Geography
- Start point: Abercraf
- End point: Swansea Docks
- Branch: 4 short branches

The Swansea Canal (Welsh: Camlas Abertawe) was a canal constructed by the Swansea Canal Navigation Company between 1794 and 1798, running for 16.5 miles (26.6 km) from Swansea to Hen Neuadd, Abercraf in South Wales. It was steeply graded, and 36 locks were needed to enable it to rise 373 feet (114 m) over its length. The main cargos were coal, iron and steel, and the enterprise was profitable.

Sold to the Great Western Railway in 1873, it continued to make a profit until 1895. A period of decline followed, with the last commercial traffic using the waterway in 1931. Subsequently, parts of it were closed and filled in under a succession of owners, but around 5 miles (8.0 km) remain in water. The Swansea Canal Society, formed in 1981, is actively involved in plans for its restoration.

== Background ==
The canal was constructed to transport coal from the upper Swansea Valley to Swansea docks for export, or for use in the early metallurgical industries in the Lower Swansea Valley. The period 1830-1840 saw the development of towns and villages around the canal: Abercraf, Clydach, Penwyllt, Pontardawe, Ynysmeudwy, Ystalyfera and Ystradgynlais came into being as early industries developed at those locations.

In 1817, Fforest Fawr (English: Great Forest of Brecon) was enclosed and divided into fields. It covered an area of 61.5 square miles (159 km^{2}) and was owned by the Crown, having originally been used for hunting by Norman lords. The Crown decided to sell it in 1812 to help fund the Napoleonic Wars, but local people with rights to graze sheep and cattle on the common land objected. 12.6 square miles (33 km^{2}) were sold to cover the cost of the Enclosure Commission, and around one third of the total area was offered for sale in 1819. Some two-thirds of this land was bought by an industrialist and London businessman called John Christie. Christie had already developed a limestone quarry at Penwyllt, and decided to develop lime kilns there as well. In 1820 he moved to Brecon, and developed the Brecon Forest Tramroad. This network consisted eventually of over 100 miles (160 km) of tracks connecting the farms of Sennybridge and Fforest Fawr (where Christie wanted to improve the land through application of lime), with the charcoal burning centres and coal extraction below Fforest Fawr, with the lime kilns at Penwyllt and ironworks at Ystradgynlais, and the Swansea Canal dock for other industries downstream. Before he could complete the system, he went bankrupt.

== History ==
With the development of Swansea harbour from the 1760s, consideration was given as to how the rich mineral resources of the Tawe valley could be moved to the coast. In 1790, William Padley surveyed the valley for a possible canal route, and in 1791 the passing of the Neath Canal Act 1791 (31 Geo. 3. c.85) to authorise the nearby Neath Canal resulted in calls for a public meeting. A meeting held on 5 April 1793 appointed the canal engineer Thomas Sheasby to conduct a survey. The plans were opposed by the Duke of Beaufort and other traders, who wanted the canal to terminate further up the river near Landore and Morriston, where they already had wharfs. Swansea Corporation favoured the route into Swansea, and offered to contribute towards its cost, whereupon the Duke, his son the Marquess of Worcester and the duke's agent withdrew their subscriptions. This action stirred others to subscribe, and £52,000 was raised almost immediately.

Swansea Canal Act 1794
- Act of Parliament
- Parliament of Great Britain
- Long title: An Act for making and maintaining a Navigable Canal from the Town of Swansea in the County of Glamorgan into the Parish of Ystradgunlais in the County of Brecon.
- Citation: 34 Geo. 3. c. 109
- Territorial extent: Great Britain

Dates
- Royal assent: 23 May 1794
- Commencement: 23 May 1794 (Note: The Acts of Parliament (Commencement) Act 1793.)
Other legislation
Amended by	Breconshire County Council Act 1946
Relates to	Swansea Valley Railway Act 1847; Swansea and Amman Junction Railway Act 1847

Status: Amended

Text of statute as originally enacted

Ultimately, a compromise was reached, with the canal terminating in Swansea, but the duke constructing 1.4 miles (2.3 km) of canal from Nant Rhydyfiliast to Nant Felin, on which he was allowed to charge tolls, which could not exceed the tolls charged by the canal company for use of the rest of the canal. The duke's section was called the Trewyddfa Canal, but was part of the main line. An act of Parliament authorising the construction, the Swansea Canal Act 1794 (34 Geo. 3. c. 109), was passed on 23 May 1794, and the Swansea Canal Company were empowered to raise £60,000 by issuing shares, and a further £30,000 if required. They were also authorised to build tramways to any places within 8 miles (13 km) of the canal, and canal branches to places within 4 miles (6.4 km). The new company took the unusual step of appointing all shareholders who held five or more shares to a steering committee, rather than electing a management committee, and of building the canal using direct labour, rather than appointing contractors. Charles Roberts was the engineer in charge of the project, and was assisted by Thomas Sheasby.

The first section of the canal from Swansea to Godre'r-Graig was opened in 1796, and the whole length of 16.5 miles (26.6 km) was completed by October 1798. Civil engineering works included 36 locks and five aqueducts to carry the canal across major tributaries of the River Tawe, at Clydach, Pontardawe, Ynysmeudwy, Ystalyfera, and Cwmgiedd. The locks on the main section were 69 by 7.5 feet (21.0 by 2.3 m), but those on the Duke's section were only 65 feet (20 m) long, and this restricted the maximum length of boats. The locks raised the canal from near sea level at Swansea through 373 feet (114 m) to reach Abercraf. At Swansea, wharfs were built alongside the river, where cargo could be transhipped into coasters. Unusually for such projects, the final cost was well within budget, with the project costing £51,602 up to mid-1798. The steering committee approach obviously worked well, as it was retained until the company was wound up.

in 1804 proposals were made to extend the canal along the seafront from Swansea to Mumbles. The purpose was to transport limestone from the quarries at Oystermouth and coal from the Clyne Valley, and to develop Mumbles as a harbour and shipping port. Discussion of the plans played out in the pages of the Cambrian Newspaper, with opponents proposing that it made more sense to further develop facilities at Swansea. Although the idea was supported by Swansea Corporation, the canal company were not keen, and the extension was not built. Instead, the Oystermouth Railway or Tramroad Act 1804 (44 Geo. 3. c. lv) was obtained to authorise the construction of a tramway from Swansea to Oystermouth.

== Operations ==
The boats were 65 feet (20 m) long, 7 feet 6 inches (2.29 m) wide and carried 22 tons of cargo when fully laden. The last narrowboat built on this canal was 'Grace Darling' in 1918 at the Godre'r Graig boat yard.

The opening of the canal caused an increase in industrial activity along the valley, with a number of manufacturing companies setting up works by its banks. Four short branch canals were constructed, and a network of tramways gradually linked mines and quarries to the canal. In 1804, 54,235 tons of coal and culm were carried, and profits were sufficient to enable a dividend of 3 per cent to be paid. Receipts and dividends rose steadily, reaching £10,522 and 14 per cent in 1840, while in 1860 they were £13,800 and 18 per cent. There are few records of how much traffic was carried, but estimates based on the amount of coal and culm shipped from Swansea Docks suggest around 386,000 tons in 1839. The opening of the Tennant Canal to Swansea Docks in 1824 resulted in the Swansea Canal's riverside wharfs being improved, and tolls were reduced to maintain trade levels.

The harbour facilities at Swansea were upgraded in 1852, when the River Tawe was diverted into a new channel to the east, and the original channel, which included the trans-shipment wharfs, became a floating harbour. A lock was constructed to give the canal boats direct access to the half-tide basin above the North Dock, and a loop of the canal was constructed along the edge of the new harbour.

== Decline ==
Great Western Railway (Swansea Canal) Act 1872 (Note: Section 1.)
- Act of Parliament
- Parliament of the United Kingdom
- Long title: An Act for enabling the Great Western Railway Company to construct Railways from the Swansea Branch of their Railway to the Swansea Vale Railway; for vesting in them the Undertaking of the Company of Proprietors of the Swansea Canal Navigation; and for other purposes.
- Citation: 35 & 36 Vict. c. clii
- Territorial extent: United Kingdom

Dates
- Royal assent: 25 July 1872
- Commencement: 25 July 1872

Status: Current legislation

Text of statute as originally enacted

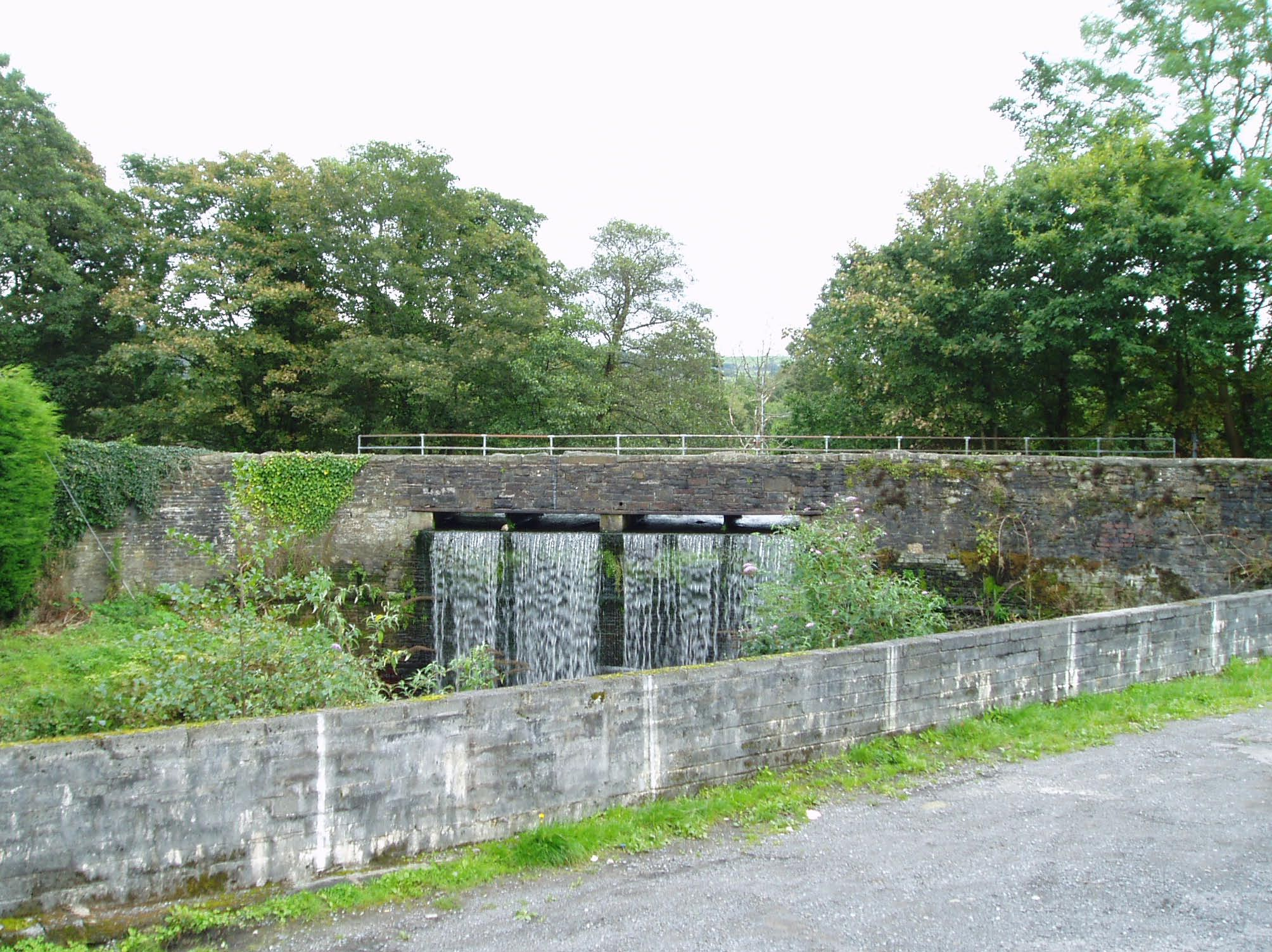
Lower Clydach Aqueduct, where the canal overflows into the River Clydach

The first suggestions that a railway should be constructed along the Tawe Valley, which would be in direct competition to the canal, were made in 1830. More serious railway proposals were made in 1845, when the canal company agreed to lease the canal to the Welsh Midland Railway for £4,264 per year, but the scheme foundered. Another scheme to lease the canal to the Neath and Brecon Railway for £9,000 per year in 1864 also foundered. The 1860s were a hard time for the canal, as the steel industry gradually replaced the iron industry, and ironworks contracted or closed. In 1871, the company approached the Great Western Railway, and negotiated a price of £107,666 for the main Swansea Canal, and £40,000 for the Duke of Beaufort's Trewyddfa Canal. The sale was authorised by the Great Western Railway (Swansea Canal) Act 1872 (35 & 36 Vict. c. clii) and took effect on 31 January 1873.

Rather than run it down, the Great Western Railway ran the canal well, and it remained profitable until 1895, when losses were first reported, though it recovered a little between 1898 and 1902. The tonnage of coal carried on the canal was very high, with 385,000 tons transported down the canal to Swansea in 1888 alone. The last commercial cargo carried on the Swansea Canal was in 1931, when coal was conveyed from Clydach to Swansea. Boats continued to operate on the canal after that date but only for maintenance work, with horse-drawn boats last recorded at Clydach in 1958.

Great Western Railway (Swansea North Dock Abandonment) Act 1928
- Act of Parliament
- Parliament of the United Kingdom
- Long title: An Act to provide for the abandonment by the Great Western Railway Company of the North Dock Swansea and of a portion of the Swansea Canal and to confer upon the Great Western Railway Company and the Corporation of Swansea powers to acquire lands and to execute works and for other purposes.
- Citation: 18 & 19 Geo. 5. c. xxxiii
- Territorial extent: United Kingdom

Dates
- Royal assent: 2 July 1928
- Commencement: 2 July 1928

Status: Current legislation

Text of statute as originally enacted

The canal was gradually abandoned, under the terms of a series of acts of Parliament, starting with the Great Western Railway (Swansea North Dock Abandonment) Act 1928 (18 & 19 Geo. 5. c. xxxiii), the Great Western Railway Act 1931 (21 & 22 Geo. 5. c. lxi) and the Breconshire County Council Act 1946 (9 & 10 Geo. 6. c. xxxii). The canal was nationalised in 1947 and became part of the British Transport Commission, whose British Transport Commission Act 1949 (12, 13 & 14 Geo. 6. c. xxix) and British Transport Commission Act 1957 (5 & 6 Eliz. 2. c. xxxiii) brought further closures. The remainder was closed under the terms of the British Transport Commission Act 1962 (10 & 11 Eliz. 2. c. xlii), when control of the canal passed to British Waterways, who remained responsible for the maintenance of the waterway and its structures until 2012, when they were superseded by the Canal and River Trust, known in Wales as Glandŵr Cymru. Although navigation had ceased, the channel was maintained to provide a water supply to the Mond Nickel Company works at Clydach.

== Present ==
In-filling of much of the canal has taken place in the past 50 years. The northern section was affected by the creation of the A4067 road around Ystradgynlais, while the southern section below Clydach had been infilled by 1982, as part of the work associated with the A4067 dual carriageway. Just five miles (8.0 km) of the canal remains in water, from Clydach to Pontardawe where it is now a popular trail and is part of route 43 of the National Cycle Network. In 1997 they applied to the Millennium Fund for money to advance their vision, but this was rejected when Associated British Ports indicated that they were against the proposal for a connecting link to the Neath and Tennant Canal.

The canal empties from an aqueduct into the Lower Clydach River at the point where it joins the River Tawe. A project is underway to dredge the canal and to remove the Japanese knotweed that grows extensively around the Swansea Valley. The canal is an important habitat for water birds and for eels. Local youngsters from Clydach often set up fishing off the banks of the canal to catch the eels.

In 1981, the Swansea Canal Society was formed, and have been working towards restoration of the remaining sections of the canal. They has done much to improve the physical environment of the canal, and have proposed the development of a 35-mile (56 km) cruising route in conjunction with a restored Neath and Tennant Canal.

On 23 October 1998, after heavy rainfall, water levels in the canal rose, and at Pontardawe, spilled over the towpath and down an embankment. The flow caused the bank to fail, and the breach caused extensive flooding. Thirty houses, some industrial units and town centre shops were affected, with the water up to 4 feet (1.2 m) deep in places.

In early 2003, British Waterways produced a document entitled Waterways for Wales: Improved quality of life through the sustainable development of the Waterways of Wales. The Welsh Assembly supported the aims of the document, recognising that restored canals stimulated economic regeneration in rural areas. They mentioned that the project to restore both the Swansea Canal and the Neath and Tennant would cost around £55 million.

In early 2019, the canal received a grant of £320,000 from the Welsh Government's Rural Development programme. The grant was to fund the dredging of around 1 mile (1.6 km) of the canal from Trebanos to Coed Gwilym Park in Clydach. This section was already used by a canoe hire business, but the extra depth would allow it to be used by a trip boat, and as a destination for trail boats. Glandŵr Cymru was responsible for organising the dredging, with work due to start in the autumn of 2019. Conservation of a number of the structures along the canal would also be funded by the grant, which marked the first stage of a ten-year plan to market the canal as a heritage, visitor and leisure destination.

The canal society were awarded £967,000 from the UK Government’s Shared Prosperity Fund in March 2024, to fund the restoration of Clydach Lock, which had been buried beneath a council depot since 1976, and 130 yards (120 m) of canal adjacent to the lock. A new top gate was fitted in July 2025, and two gates at the bottom end of the lock were installed in August 2025. Some finishing work remained to be done.

== Route ==
=== Northern section ===
The upper terminus of the Swansea Canal was a large basin situated to the west of Aber-craf, close to an 'S'-bend in the River Tawe. There was an iron works nearby, and two tramways linked it to limestone quarries near the summit of Cribarth, a hill to the north-east. There were 33 large quarries near the summit, and many smaller ones, which were served by 10.5 miles (16.9 km) of tramways. Differences in level were handled by 18 inclined planes, built at various times between 1794, when the canal opened, and the 1890s, when quarrying ceased. The main line built by John Christie in the 1820s included four consecutive inclines. Early tramways were built to a gauge of 2 ft 3 in (686 mm), but this was later superseded by 3 ft 6 in (1,067 mm). The Rheola Arms public house was sandwiched between the basin and the river, and the Lamb and Flag Inn was located on the south bank of the river, just across a bridge. The canal headed south-west, to pass through the two Cae'r Bont Locks at Ynys-bydafau. There was a brickworks, some saw pits, and a lime kiln by the second lock, as well as a dock and dry dock, built by Christie in 1825. From the dock, a tramway crossed the river and ascended to Mynydd y Drum by three inclined planes. Parts of it were originally the Gwaunclawdd Colliery tramroad, and although much of Mynydd y Drum has been stripped away by opencast mining, the entrance to the colliery survives. The modern A4067 road runs along the canal from the basin to just after the first lock, and then veers southwards to cross the river.

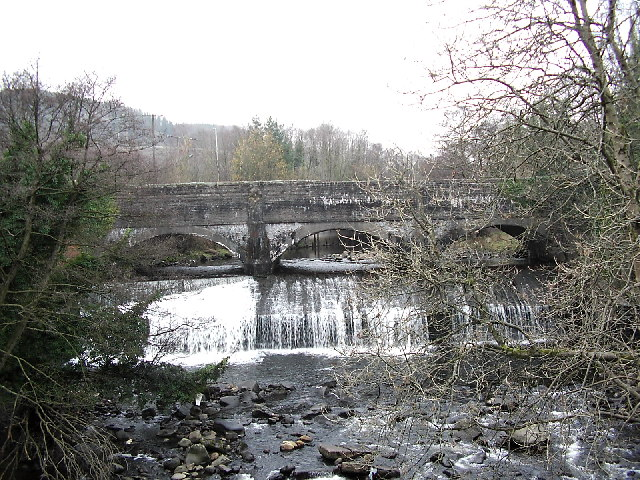
The isolated aqueduct which carried the canal over the River Twrch at Ystalyfera

The canal continues to the west of the river, passing through the first of the three Ynys Uchaf Locks, before it turned sharply to the west, where there were two more locks. The road recrosses the river and once more follows the course of the canal from the bend. Before reaching Ynys Isaf, there was a much wider section of canal. The two Ynys Isaf Locks were located to the south west of the hamlet, either side of the Ship Inn. The first of several aqueducts carried the canal over the River Giedd, where there were limekilns. Ystradgynlais Lock was near Bryn-y-groes, as the establishment of the town of Ystradgynlais to the east of the river was a later development. There was another wider section, which by 1878 was already marked "Old Quarry", but had a coal stage associated with Pant-mawr Colliery by 1904. The Star Inn and the Ynys Cedwyn Arms were both located on the east bank. At Gorof there were two more locks, one to the north and the other to the south of the bridge. There was also a waterwheel by the second lock, one of 42 positioned along the canal.

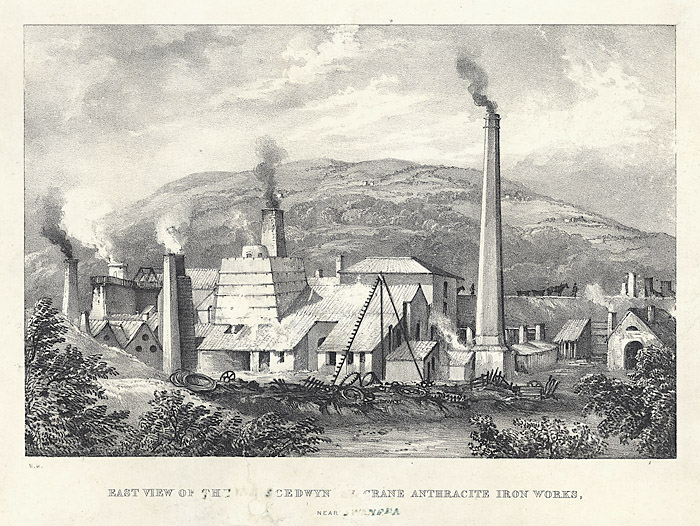
Yniscedwyn anthracite iron works; c. 1845.

By 1904, a tramway from the Pant-mawr Colliery ran along the western bank of the canal, and crossed the head of the lower lock to reach railway sidings from the Ynyscedwyn Branch of the Midland Railway. There were two more locks further to the west at Pen-y-Gorof. The Ynyscedwyn Branch met the Ynyscedwyn Works Branch near the lower one, and crossed over its tail. The railway followed the course of the earlier Claypon's Tramway Extension, built by Joseph Claypon between 1832 and 1834. He had become the owner of the Brecon Forest Tramways in 1829, on the bankruptcy of Christie. It linked the Drum Colliery to Gurnos Wharf, and he intended to use locomotives on it, although locomotive working from end to end would not have been possible, because there was a large incline in the middle. This was powered, rather than being self-acting, as he wanted to develop traffic northwards from Gurnos onto the Brecon Forest Tramways. The double-track Ynysgedwyn incline is one of the most impressive structures of its type in south Wales which still survive, rising 696 feet (212 m) along its 1,400-yard (1,300 m) length. The gradient increases from 1 in 8 at its foot to 1 in 5 at its head, where there are the remains of an engine house. Just below the bridge where the tramway crossed the canal, a branch canal was built to serve the Ynysgedwyn Ironworks. It curves along the edge of a sportsground and playing field, and the former towing path is now a public footpath.

Continuing to the south west, the main line of the canal then turned towards the south. The A4067 road leaves the canal briefly, to follow the track of the railway, and the canal is marked by a minor road and public footpath, until it reaches the roundabout on the B4599 Gurnos Road. A short length of the canal survives below the roundabout, where it crosses the River Twrch on an aqueduct. This was one of the first in Britain to be built using hydraulic mortar, and was restored in 1995, although it contains no water. There were two locks at Gurnos, one by a corn mill and the second by the railway station. The A4067 rejoins the canal bed below the station, and is flanked by Canal Terrace to the west. There was a small brickworks by the terrace, and the much larger Ystalyfera Iron and Tinplate Works a little further along the canal. This included a row of eleven blast furnaces, making it the largest such installation in South Wales, and the tinplate works was the largest in the world.

The canal passed to the west of the Tinplate Works, but the road passes along its eastern edge. From Ystalyfera to Godre'r-graig, the canal is virtually straight, but the road is offset slightly to the east. The road has made the channel narrower, but the remains of six of the seven locks are still visible, and there are other industrial buildings which were associated with the canal still in existence. The narrowed channel, which is 6 to 8 feet (1.8 to 2.4 m) wide, is owned by the Canal and River Trust, and acts as a feeder from the River Tawe. By Godre'r-graig, the canal turns to the west, but the road continues southwards. Around 1 mile (1.6 km) of the canal between the parting and Ynysmeudwy is owned by Neath Port Talbot County Borough Council, and is managed as a nature reserve.

=== Middle section ===
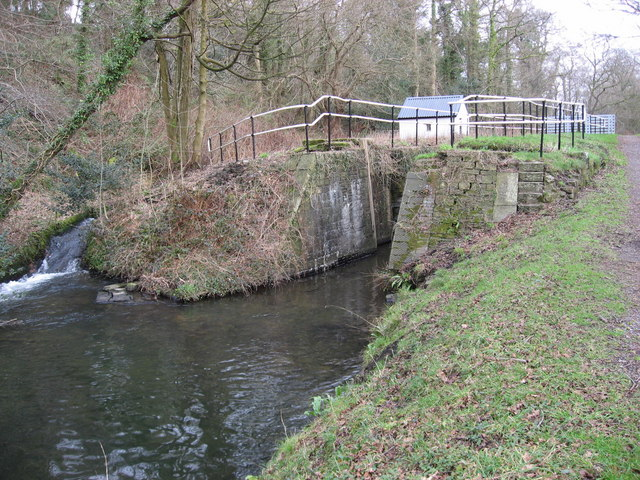
Lower Ynysmeudwy Lock, with its restored lock cottage

Most of the next 5.5 miles (8.9 km) is in water, and some of it has been restored. After the unrestored Cilmaengwyn lock, the canal is crossed by the B4603 road and almost immediately crosses the Cwmdu Aqueduct. The minor bridge below the aqueduct was known as Pottery Bridge, for there was a pottery nearby from 1850. China clay was brought up the canal by barge, and a wide variety of items were manufactured by the workforce, which consisted of 112 people at its peak. Many of the items made are now collectible. By 1898, its site was occupied by a tinplate works, which was served by a siding connecting to a railway on the far side of the river.

Ynysmeudwy Upper and Lower Locks are below the bridge. By 1878, the lower lock was crossed by a railway connecting the Cwm-nant-du Collieries to a Patent Fuel Works, by the lock, and continuing over the river to join the railway line. The collieries were disused by 1898, and only a short section of the railway line remained, as the link over the lock and river had been removed. Next came a branch from the main line of the canal to the side of the river, with a dock at the end. A tramway connected the dock to the Waun-y-coed Colliery on the south bank of the river, and there were tramway connections to the Cwm-nant-llwyd Colliery to the south and another to the north-east. The branch is clearly visible from the bridge where the A road crosses, but there are no structures visible any longer of the dock itself and it is difficult to walk to this section due to the growth of brambles etc. The canal is navigable from Ynysmeudwy Lower Lock to Pontardawe, where further progress is blocked by Ynysgylennen Bridge, which has been lowered. The canal continues a little further, passing under Herbert Street Bridge and over Upper Clydach Aqueduct, before disappearing into a culvert.

The culverted section once contained a dock and the two Pontardawe Locks. The Pontardawe Tin Plate Works was located immediately to the east of the canal between the locks, and by 1878 was served by railway sidings which crossed the river to reach the works. Approaching Trebanos, the canal re-emerges from its culvert, to reach Trebanos Lock and Green Lock. The Pheasant Bush Tin Works beside Trebanos Lock was disused by 1898. By Coedgwilym Park, the canal turns briefly to the west, to pass under the B4603 Pontardawe Road bridge, and then there was another short culverted section beneath a council depot, which was the location of a lock. You could walk around the council depot and the drop in level between each end was quite noticeable. John Evans, the man charged with demolishing the lock when the depot was being constructed in the 1970s, ignored instructions and deliberately left most of the lock undamaged, in the hope that one day it could be restored with the minimum of effort. The council depot has since been closed, and the towpath was reinstated through the site.

The infilled section above the lock was reopened in late 2023, when the local MP Tonia Antoniazzi cut a rope to formally mark the completion of the work. Mark Evans, the director of the Canal and River Trust's Wales and South West division and the son of John Evans, was also present at the ceremony. Funding of £220,000 for the project came from the Welsh Government's Brilliant Basics fund, which is used to finance small scale projects that will benefit tourism. Some work had been done to investigate the lock, and although the top of the lock walls were removed at the time the depot was built, what was left was carefully repointed, preserving the integrity of the lower walls. There was a short tramway from below the lock to Ynys-penllwch Graig-ola Colliery. Mond Lock was next, with the B4603 crossing the tail of the lock. Below the bridge is the Mond Nickel Works, set up in 1900 after the chemist Dr Ludwig Mond discovered a process for producing pure nickel. Nickel ore was imported from Canada, and the site was chosen because there were supplies of anthracite coal, water, transport links to Swansea, and an available labour force. The canal crosses the Lower Clydach River on an aqueduct, which discharges water into the river, and the watered section comes to an abrupt halt about 50 yards (46 m) further on.

=== Southern section ===
The next lock was located at Ynystawe in the industrial estate to the south-west of the current terminus. In 1879, it was surrounded by a gas works, a brick works, Clydach Foundry, a tinplate works, and a network of railway sidings radiating from near Cwm Clydach railway station. The canal turned to the south, to run beside the river, and then to the south-west, where it ran parallel to the Swansea Vale Railway. The course of both is now marked by the A4067 road. Junction 45 on the M4 motorway is built over the route of the canal. At Tirpenry, the canal swerved to the west, while the railway passed along the eastern edge of the Midland Tinplate Works and the Morriston Tinplate Works. The A4067 follows the course of the railway at this point, but resumes following the bed of the canal a little further to the south. From this point southwards, the canal was surrounded by a large variety of industrial works around 1900. This included the Tir Penry chemical works and the Union chemical works; Morriston Pottery and Copper Pit, which was a coal pit; Forest spelter works and Morriston spelter works; Rose copper works, Plas Marl coal pit and Landore copper works; Millbrook iron works, Landore tinplate works and Landore Siemens steel works. A tramway crossed the canal to reach the Hafod copper works, a little further to the east of the canal. Next was Hafod phosphate works, where there was a lock with a dock just above it on the eastern bank, and Hafod nickel and cobalt works, where there was another lock, with dry docks on the western bank below it. The final section of the canal is marked by the location of Morfa Road, running beside the railway tracks that lead to Swansea's High Street railway station. To the east was the North Dock, and there was a network of wharfs and two more locks, one leading into the dock, with a final loop built to service the main part of the North Dock. The North Dock was closed in 1930, as a result of the development of new docks to the east of the Tawe, although the half-tide basin at its southern end remained in use until 1969.

=== Connections southwards ===
Restoration of the original route to Clydach would not be possible, but since the construction of Swansea Barrage across Swansea Bay, water levels in the River Tawe are maintained at all states of the tide, and so it could be used to reach Llansamlet, from where the Nant-y-fendrod stream could be canalised to reach Fendrod Lake. The lake is to the east of the River Tawe, and from it, some 3 miles (4.8 km) of new canal and an aqueduct over the Tawe would be required to link up with the remains of the original canal. More recently, it has been suggested that a lock at Clydach might drop boats down into the River Tawe, which they would cross on the level to enter the new section of canal. This would link to the Nant-y-fendrod river and Fendrod Lake further down, before re-entering the river. Another lock would enable boats to reach the eastern docks in Swansea, from where a link to the Tennant Canal would be accessible.

Historically, some 3 miles (4.8 km) of the River Tawe were used by ships in the 18th and 19th centuries, serving the industries that were located along its banks. There are still signs of this at Landore, where a stone-built quay built between 1772 and 1774 provided access to deep water enabling coal to reach the Swansea valley prior to the construction of the canal. It is a scheduled monument. A little further downstream is Morfa Quay, dating from the mid-19th century, which was used to offload copper ore from Cornwall destined for the Morfa copper works on the west bank of the river. The river is semi-tidal up to the junction with the Nant-y-fendrod stream, as Swansea barrage is higher than high neap tides, but spring tides overtop the barrage, raising the water level.

The river is already used by a trip boat, the Copper Jack, which runs from Swansea Marina upstream almost to the confluence with the Nant-y-fendrod. It is the only large vessel that regularly navigates this section of the river, and does so despite the fact that navigation on this section is not encouraged. It was restricted to working below the rolling bridge at Morfa, as the bridge was deemed to be unsafe, but the bridge was removed for refurbishment around 2020, and when replaced, navigation was again possible above it. Copper Jack can carry up to 50 passengers, and in the early 2020s, an application for funding for a new pontoon was successful. This would allow passengers to disembark from the boat near the Liberty Stadium and Hafod-Morfa Copperworks. A total of £353,864 of grants was being administered by the Swansea Bay Fisheries Local Action Group. The pontoon was the largest of nine projects, with £215,551 allocated for its construction, and it was completed in October 2023. It is located next to the Hafod Morfa Copperworks site, and the project included constructing habitat for otters on the river. The route for the new canal along the Nant-y-fendrod to Clydach, and the route of a link from the Prince of Wales Dock to a basin at Crymlyn on the Tennant Canal have been safeguarded in the Swansea Local Development Plan.

The link from Swansea to Clydach would consist of two sections. The lower section would be a canalisation of the Nant-y-fendrod, passing through Fendrod or Enterprise Lake, and would be 0.93 miles (1.5 km) long. It would need four locks to be constructed, and four culverts carrying the Nant-y-fendrod under existing roads would need to be enlarged to accommodate boats. Beyond the upper end of the Nant-y-fendrod, a new section of canal would complete the link to Clydach. This would pass under the M4 motorway through an existing bridge that spans the River Tawe and Garth Road. It would include another seven locks, a fixed bridge, five lift bridges, and an aqueduct to carry the canal across the Tawe similar to the one installed on the Neath and Tennant Canal at Ynysbwllog. This link was costed at £18 million in 2002, and was estimated to cost around £30 million in 2020. The Swansea Canal can accommodate boats which are 7.5 feet (2.3 m) wide, slightly wider than standard British narrow boats, but since the link would be new, there are advantages in making it wide enough to allow boats such at Copper Jack, which is 15 feet (4.6 m) wide, to travel as far as Clydach.

To complete the link from the Tawe to the Neath and Tennant Canal, a new lock into the Prince of Wales Dock would be required, as the ship lock from the river into the dock has been closed. A flood lock would protect a new canal from fluctuations in the water level within the dock, and after passing under a railway line and Fabian Way, would ascend to the level of the Neath and Tennant Canal by a lock. The new channel would be 1.3 miles (2.1 km) long and there would be two bridges along its length. Estimated cost for the link in 2020 was £6 million, and again, the option to build it wide enough to allow boats such as Copper Jack to reach Crymlyn would provide increased opportunities for tourism.

== Points of interest ==
Point	Coordinates (Links to map resources)	OS Grid Ref	Notes
Abercraf basin	51.7983°N 3.7300°W	SN808124	
River Giedd aqueduct	51.7851°N 3.7570°W	SN789110	
River Twrch aqueduct	51.7683°N 3.7800°W	SN772092	
Start of watered section	51.7432°N 3.8092°W	SN751064	
Cwmdu aqueduct	51.7365°N 3.8245°W	SN741057	
Upper Clydach aqueduct	51.7196°N 3.8528°W	SN721039	End of watered section
Start of lower watered section	51.7113°N 3.8624°W	SN714030	
Lower Clydach aqueduct	51.6939°N 3.8981°W	SN689011	End of lower watered section
Swansea Docks wharfs	51.6251°N 3.9392°W	SS658935	

== See also ==
- Canals of the United Kingdom
- History of the British canal system

== Bibliography ==
- Cumberlidge, Jane (2009). Inland Waterways of Great Britain (8th Ed.). Imray Laurie Norie and Wilson. ISBN 978-1-84623-010-3.
- Hadfield, Charles (1967). The Canals of South Wales and the Border. David and Charles. ISBN 978-0-7153-4027-1.
- Hughes, S (1990). The Archaeology of an Early Railway System: The Brecon Forest Tramroads. Aberystwyth: RCAHMW. ISBN 978-1-871184-05-1.
- Ludgate, Martin (12 November 2020). "Restoration: Unlocking the Swansea". Canal Boat. ISSN 1362-0312. Archived from the original on 3 December 2021.
- Ludgate, Martin (15 April 2024). "Hidden depths". Canal Boat. ISSN 1362-0312. Archived from the original on 16 September 2024.
- Moss, Patrick (30 October 2020). "Navigation on the river Tawe – Swansea: Landings and Links" (PDF). Swansea Council. Archived from the original (PDF) on 4 April 2025.
- Nicholson (2006). Nicholson Guides Vol 4: Four Counties and the Welsh Canals. Harper Collins. ISBN 978-0-00-721112-8.
- Potter, Hugh (August 2007). "Canals of the Valleys". Waterways World. ISSN 0309-1422.
- Priestley, Joseph (1831). "Historical Account of the Navigable Rivers, Canals, and Railways, of Great Britain". Archived from the original on 4 March 2016.
- Squires, Roger (2008). Britain's restored canals. Landmark Publishing. ISBN 978-1-84306-331-5.
