= Mynydd Allt-y-grug =

Hill in Neath Port Talbot, Wales

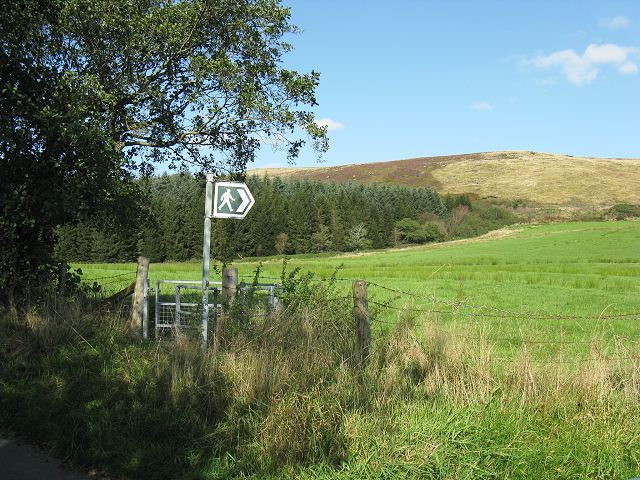
- Mynydd Allt-y-grug and Footpath, Looking Northeast

Highest point
- Elevation: 338 m (1,109 ft)
- Prominence: 190 m (620 ft)
- Listing: Marilyn
- Coordinates: 51.756°N 3.811°W

Naming
- Language of name: Welsh

Geography
- Location: Neath Port Talbot, Wales
- OS grid: SN 751079
- Topo map: OS Landranger 170 / Explorer 165

Mynydd Allt-y-grug is a 338-metre-high hill immediately west of Ystalyfera in the county borough of Neath Port Talbot in South Wales. Its twin summits are around 400m apart. The upper part of the hill is largely covered in heather whilst conifers clothe its western slopes and gorse, bracken and bramble cover much of its rough landslide eastern side which rises above the Swansea Valley, drainage on this side flowing to the River Tawe.

== Geology ==
The hill is formed from multiple layers of Pennant Sandstone with intervening mudstone layers and occasional coal seams. All are tilted to the south and southwest towards the axis of the South Wales Coalfield syncline. The lower parts of its western slopes are mantled by glacial till. Much of the eastern side of the hill is a large landslip which is intermittently active and destructive of properties in Ystalyfera and Pantyffynnon.

== Scheduled Monuments ==
There is an ancient cairn, possibly of Bronze Age date, a few hundred metres to the south of the hill's southern summit.

== Access ==
The upper parts of Mynydd Allt-y-grug are designated as open access under the Countryside and Rights of Way Act 2000 as is the conifer plantation which extends across much of its lower western slopes. There are no recorded public rights of way to its summit but a public footpath skirts the hill through the forest to its west and northwest and connects to Ystalyfera via the farmstead of Penlan-fach. There are however a number of other tracks which run across its slopes.

== See also ==
- List of Scheduled Monuments in Neath Port Talbot
