= Nant-y-fendrod =

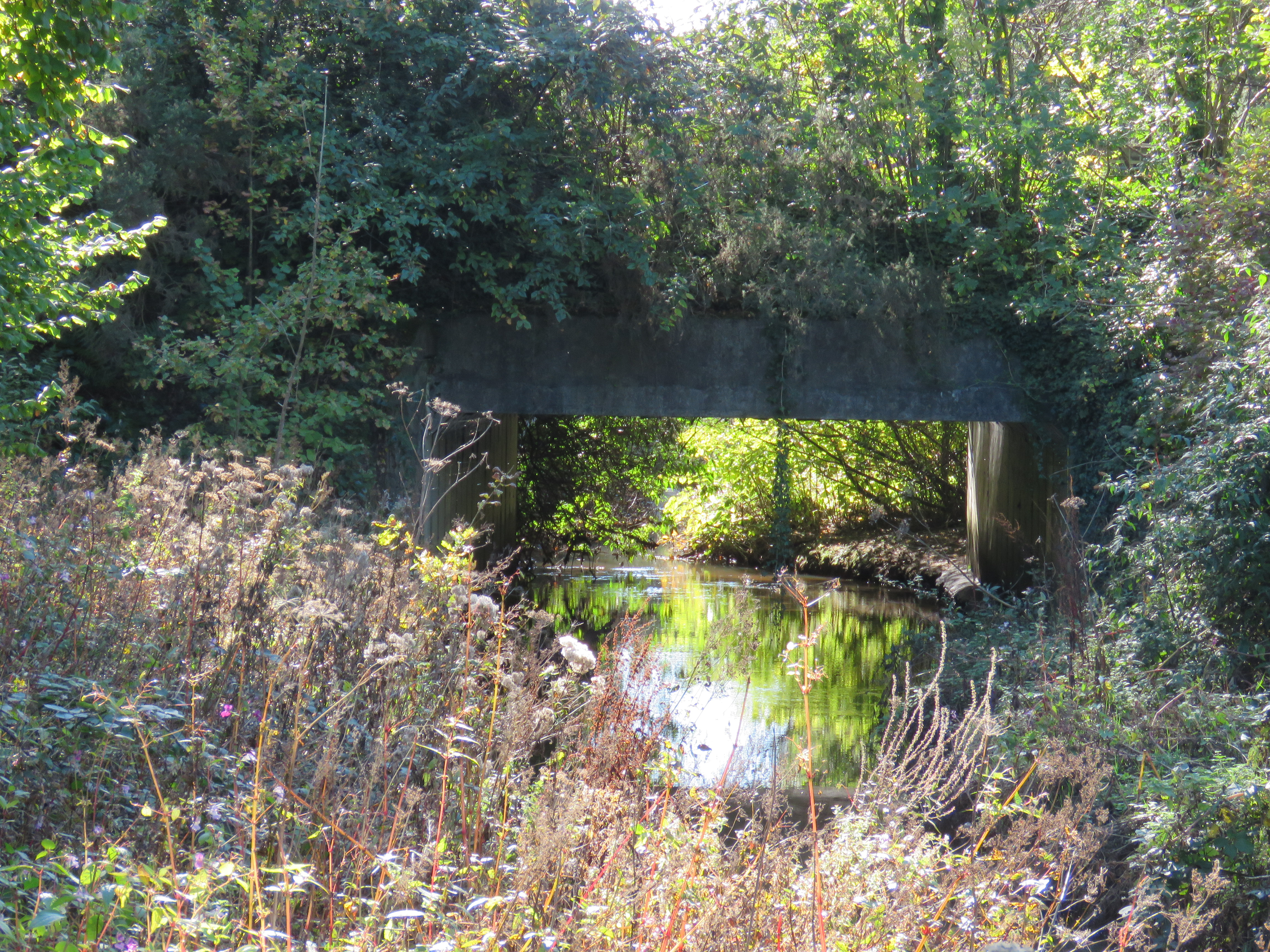
- The bridge that carries Fendrod Way over the Nant-y-fendrod

Location
- Country: Wales

Physical characteristics
- Source
  - location: Marsh on the River Tawe flood plain
  - coordinates: 51.6871°N 3.8985°W
  - elevation: 98 feet (30 m)
- Mouth
  - location: River Tawe near Liberty Stadium
  - coordinates: 51.6524°N 3.9239°W
- Length: 2.6 miles (4.2 km)

Basin features
- River system: River Tawe
- Tributaries
  - left: Nant-y-Ffin, Nant Bran

Nant-y-fendrod, often known simply as the Fendrod, is a small stream near Swansea in South Wales. It is a tributary of the River Tawe, and has two tributaries, the Nant Bran and the Nant-y-Ffin. It is 2.6 miles (4.2 km) long, and rises in the flood plain of the River Tawe, at an elevation of around 98 feet (30 m).

The stream is heavily polluted, with levels of zinc and cadmium exceeding acceptable levels, as a result of past metal processing which took place in the area. It has been used to test the use of water hyacinth as a way of removing metals from the water, and the research will inform the use of such methods for river quality remediation in the United Kingdom and Europe.

== Course ==
The Fendrod rises in marshy ground on the eastern bank of the River Tawe, to the east of Ynysforgan and to the north-west of Birchgrove. It passes through a culvert under Ynysallan Road, the M4 motorway and the Swansea District railway line, to emerge into the Swansea Enterprise Park. There is a small in-line lake, before it is crossed by the B4625 road. Nant Bran, which rises on the slopes of Mynydd Drumau to the north east of Birchgrove and flows in a south-westerly direction, joins on the left bank. Continuing southwards, it is crossed by Clarion Close, and forms two channels which both pass under the A48 Samlet Road, which unite again before reaching Fendrod Way. Nant-y-Ffin rises between Trallwn and Winsh-wen and flows broadly north-west. Much of it is culverted, and the culvert discharges into the Fendrod just before it enters a much larger lake, known as Fendrod Lake or Enterprise Lake. This has a surface area of around 13 acres (5.3 ha) and was constructed as part of a flood defence scheme. Swansea Council applied for permission to create it in July 1979. The impounding weir is 421 yards (385 m) upstream from the river mouth, and the lake has a capacity of 42.35 million imperial gallons (192.5 Ml). The Fendrod passes over the weir at the outlet of the lake and flows broadly west, to join the River Tawe on its left bank.

== Navigation ==
The route of the Fendrod through Swansea Enterprise Park has been safeguarded in the Swansea Local Development Plan as the most feasible route for extending the Swansea Canal southwards. The canal was built between 1794 and 1798, running from Abercraf to Swansea Docks. It was taken over by the Great Western Railway in 1873 and remained profitable into the early 20th century. All traffic ceased in 1931, but because it was used to supply water to industry, it remained intact and was nationalised in 1947, passing to the British Waterways Board in the 1960s. Since then, parts have been filled in, and only the middle section from Clydach to Ynysmeudwy remains. This is being restored by the Swansea Canal Society.

The River Tawe is navigable almost up to the junction with the Fendrod, and although boats are not encouraged on this section, the Copper Jack trip boat regularly uses it, running between Swansea Marina and a new pontoon at the Hafod Morfa Copperworks site. Swansea Council would like to encourage use of the river, and the Fendrod provides a suitable route for an extension of the Swansea Canal southwards to join the Tawe. In Swansea, a lock would provide a link to the Prince of Wales Dock and onwards to Crymlyn on the Neath and Tennant Canal, creating 35 miles (56 km) of linked waterway. Although the Swansea Canal was built to carry boats which were 7.5 feet (2.3 m) wide and the Neath and Tennant Canals were 9 feet (2.7 m) wide, Swansea Council would like to see the links built to accommodate wider boats such as Copper Jack, which is 15 feet (4.6 m) wide, to provide better opportunities for tourism.

The Fendrod would require a significant upgrade to make it navigable. A new canal would be built from Clydach, crossing the River Tawe and passing beneath the M4 motorway using an existing bridge which also spans the River Tawe and Garth Road. This section would require seven locks, a fixed bridge, five lift bridges and an aqueduct to be constructed. Once into the Enterprise Park, the new canal would join an enlarged Fendrod, which would have four locks built along its length, while four culverts and a bridge under existing roads would need to be enlarged.

== Hydrology ==
The Fendrod rises in the flood plain of the River Tawe at an elevation of around 98 feet (30 m). It is quite different to most of the rivers in South Wales, as its gradient is low. In contrast its tributary, the Nant Bran, is much steeper, rising at an altitude of around 720 feet (220 m). The slow-moving relatively deep channel flows over a bed of fine gravel, sand and silt. Two lakes along its course and several flood defence structures alter its characteristics. It flows through an area which was the centre of copper production globally in the 18th and 19th centuries, and over seven million tons of smelting waste were dumped on the valley floor. This destroyed vegetation and the associated habitats. Heavy rainfall meant that contaminants were washed from the waste into the river system and surrounding land.

The first serious attempts to look at the problems were made between 1961 and 1965. The Lower Swansea Valley Project looked at the geology, hydrology and biology of the river, and considered how re-vegetation could be achieved. One suggestion was that the river should be culverted, to reduce flooding and allow redevelopment, but this is no longer considered to be good practice, as it tends to increase flood risks, and as only small sections were culverted, the rest of the river remained in contact with contaminated land. Some remediation work took place at the time, but water quality is still affected by metal contamination. Under the Water Framework Directive, passed by the European Union in 2000, all water bodies should reach "good ecological status", and the reasons for failing to do so should be investigated, so that plans can be put in place to rectify the issues. Under that legislation, the Fendrod is classified as a heavily modified water body, and fails to meet quality standards due to a number of factors, including contamination by zinc, manganese and cadmium, all of which are highly toxic to organisms and the environment. Studies have been carried out on the use of water hyacinth to remove metals from the river. While it was known that they remove metals from water, this was the first time they have been tried out on a water body in the United Kingdom.

Water hyacinth is an aquatic plant which is native to South America, originating in the Amazon rain forests of Brazil. It floats on the surface of water bodies, and is extremely fast-growing. While it is known to be good at removing metal pollutants from water, its rapid grownth rate is problematic, as it forms dense mats of vegetation that can result in flooding, interference with navigation and power generation, and destruction of native flora. Its use in the remediation of water contaminated with metals has been on-going since around 1975, but generally only in regions where the climate is similar to its native climate. The study conducted on the Fendrod in 2016 was the first known attempt to use it for water quality remediation in a northern hemispere river.

Three types of test were carried out. A stock of plants was obtained from a grower in Enfield, London, to ensure good provenance and consistent quality. Sufficient plants were used to cover the surface of the water being treated, and the water was analysed by inductively coupled plasma mass spectrometry (ICP-MS) to determine the concentrations of 21 elements prior to and after treatment. The first test was a bench test, where river water was diluted to give differing concentrations of metals, and the plants were added for eight hours. This was repeated on the second day, and a 21-day test was carried out after that. Samples were taken throughout the tests, and a control experiment using tap water was conducted alongside the river water tests.

The second type of test was conducted in-situ. This required permits to be obtained under the Invasive Alien Species Regulations, the Wildlife and Countryside Act 1981, and the Environmental Permitting (England and Wales) Regulations 2010. A secure pod had to be constructed, which allowed water to enter and exit it, but prevented any of the plants or plant fragments from escaping into the river, as they are invasive species. The pod was divided into two halves, which were separately monitored, and was placed on the river bed for the duration of the tests. The tests lasted for seven hours, and were repeated over three consecutive days. The third type of test was a bank-side test, where water was pumped from the river into the test pod. This configuration meant that the treated water was not diluted by untreated river water surrounding the pod. It also allowed an assessment of whether a small scale treatment system would be effective, and could possibly be upscaled in the future. The tests were conducted for four hours on three consecutive days, as longer tests would have required an abstraction licence to be obtained.

The bench tests showed that metal concentrations were reduced by 63 percent for aluminium, 62 percent for zinc, 47 percent for cadmium and 22 percent for manganese. Arsenic, nickel and cobalt concentrations were also lower. For the 21-day test, cadmium, cobalt and manganese were removed almost entirely, and zinc levels dropped by 80 percent. The results were broadly in line with those of other researches for bench tests, and the reduction in cadmium levels were significant for such a brief test, since the normal levels in the river are several orders of magnitude higher than the maximum allowable concentration for good water quality. Results from the in-situ tests showed a smaller but significant reduction in metal concentrations. The researchers suggested that reductions might have been better if the experiments had been conducted during June, July or August, when growth rate of the water hyacinth is greatest. When the bank-side tests were conducted, the weather was cooler due to delays in obtaining permits, but still showed good results.

The tests were carried out under the Water and Abandoned Metal Mines programme, run by the Coal Authority, which became the Mining Remediation Authority in 2024. The cost of the project was £5,000, which was funded by De Montfort University and Natural Resources Wales. The Senior Environment Officer for Natural Resources Wales, Jonathan Jones, stated that the experiment had "potentially far-reaching consequences" because of its success. Over 120 miles (190 km) of rivers in Wales are polluted with heavy metals from former mines, while in England, the figure is 930 miles (1,500 km). Water hyacinths offer a low cost, environmentally friendly solution, but their use would need to be handled carefully, as the introduction of non-native species has a history of causing serious damage to ecological systems.

== Bibliography ==
- Blake, W.H.; Walsh, R.P.D.; Barnsley, M.J.; Palmer, G.; Dyrynda, P.; James, J.G. (2003). "Heavy metal concentrations during storm events in a rehabilitated industrialized catchment" (PDF). Hydrological Processes. 17 (10). John Wiley & Sons: 1923. Bibcode:2003HyPr...17.1923B. doi:10.1002/hyp.1218.
- Cumberlidge, Jane (2009). Inland Waterways of Great Britain (8th Ed.). Imray Laurie Norie and Wilson. ISBN 978-1-84623-010-3.
- Hand, Caroline (2 October 2018). "Invasive species — not always hostile". Croner-i. Archived from the original on 14 April 2025.
- Jones, Jonathan L.; Jenkins, Richard O.; Palmer, Christopher M; Haris, Parvez I. (2017). "An Environmental Study of the Nant-y-fendrod Stream in South Wales" (PDF). WIT Transactions on Ecology and The Environment. 216.
- Jones, Jonathan L.; Jenkins, Richard O.; Haris, Parvez I. (23 July 2018). "Extending the geographic reach of the water hyacinth plant in removal of heavy metals from a temperate Northern Hemisphere river". Nature. 8: 11071. Bibcode:2018NatSR...811071J. doi:10.1038/s41598-018-29387-6. PMC 6056511.
- Moss, Patrick (30 October 2020). "Navigation on the river Tawe – Swansea: Landings and Links" (PDF). Swansea Council. Archived from the original (PDF) on 4 April 2025.
- Nicholson (2006). Nicholson Guides Vol 4: Four Counties & the Welsh Canals. Harper Collins. ISBN 978-0-00-721112-8.
