= National Cycle Route 43 =

Cycle route in Wales, United Kingdom

Coordinates: 51.6190°N 3.9341°W

National Cycle Network, Route 43 is part of the National Cycle Network and the Celtic Trail, which connects Swansea with Builth Wells. Most of the route is still awaiting development. As of June 2006, there is a 13-mile section out of Swansea that is open and signed.

== The route ==
The existing developed part of the route uses existing cycleways and canal Paths and follows the River Tawe.

=== Swansea ===
The route begins in the Maritime Quarter near the Swansea Bay barrage. It runs alongside the Tawe west bank past the Sainsbury's store where cyclists have to cross via a pedestrian crossing at the Quay Parade bridge. Once across the road, the route turns right over the Quay Parade bridge. Once over the bridge, there is an immediate left turn into a dedicated path which follows the west bank of the River Tawe as far as the Pentre-Chwyth traffic junction, in the White Rock area. To the left of this path the Hafod copper works are visible.

Signage for the route is poor at the White Rock area and there are a number of alternate routes northwards that can be taken there. The most traffic free route from the Pentre-Chwyth junction continues left into the Morfa Retail Park, over the Liberty Stadium foot bridge, then right again following the east bank of the River Tawe past the Liberty Stadium, then under the Landore viaduct.

=== Clydach ===
The main route through Clydach follows the direction of the Swansea Canal, and is flat all the way, however there are several barriers which require cyclists to dismount. Kingfishers can be seen, especially close to Pontardawe. The path in the area can be busy with dog walkers.

=== Trebanos ===
The path continues from Pontardawe Leisure centre and the Trebanos stretch begins behind the Colliers Arms / post office in Trebanos and follows the canal down towards Clydach. It comes out in Coedgwilym Park.

=== Pontardawe ===
In Pontardawe the splits into two sections at the rear of Pontardawe leisure centre. One cycle path goes to the east of the leisure centre alongside the River Tawe. The other path keeps following the canal tow path to Ystradgynlais. The cycle path continues through the Pontardawe recreation ground alongside the river.

=== Ystalyfera & Ystradgynlais ===
Takes a little detour on to the public road, but reconnects at "Starving Hill" and has a tarmacked section all the way to the "Heads of the Valleys" road.

=== Brecon Beacons ===
The route soon connects with Route 46 at the Heads of the Valleys road, and travels over the Fforest Fawr mountain range to Trecastle at the northern boundary of the Brecon Beacons National Park.

=== Builth Wells ===
The route continues on minor roads across the west flank of Mynydd Epynt, to Tirabad and Llangammarch Wells, then on to Builth Wells where it joins Route 8 (Lon Las Cymru).
