= Cribarth =

Hill (428m) in Powys, Wales

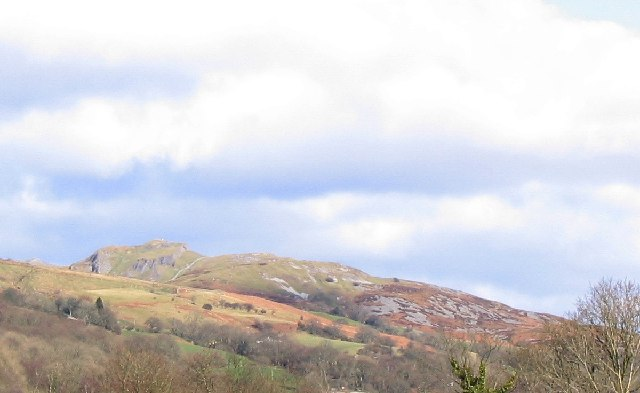
- "Sleeping giant" profile of Cribarth viewed from the southwest

Highest point
- Elevation: 428 m (1,404 ft)
- Prominence: 61 m (200 ft)
- Coordinates: 51.814°N 3.701°W

Geography
- Location: Powys, Wales
- Parent range: Brecon Beacons
- OS grid: SN831143

Cribarth (nicknamed the Sleeping Giant) is a hill in the Brecon Beacons National Park, Powys, Wales, in the traditional county of Brecknockshire. The summit lies on the broken ridge at an elevation of 428 m (1,404 ft) at OS grid reference SN 831143. To its west is a 426-metre-high (1,398 ft) rounded top at SN 829144 which lies just to the northwest of a mile-long ridge that forms the main bulk of the hill. The ridge attains a height of 423 m (1,388 ft) at its southwest end and this spot is marked by a trig point. Both of these latter high points are adorned by Bronze Age burial cairns.

== Geology ==
The hill is formed from both Carboniferous Limestone rocks and the Namurian age Twrch Sandstone (former 'Basal Grit') of the Marros Group (former 'Millstone Grit Series'), also dating from the Carboniferous Period. It lies on the northeast-southwest aligned geological structure known as the Cribarth Disturbance and indeed gives its name to that regionally important structure. The Disturbance is characterised locally by a tight anticline which follows the alignment of the summit ridge and which is accompanied by one or two lesser folds on its northwestern side.

Numerous crags, restricted areas of broken limestone pavement and shakeholes adorn the slopes of this hill as do various man-made features relating to its geology and described below.

The hill has been used by generations of geology students for mapping practice.

== Industrial archaeology ==
The tightly folded limestone beds of the summit ridge of Cribarth are intensely fractured making them easy to quarry. Numerous quarries were worked around the summit of the mountain and on its flanks during the nineteenth century and the rock removed by tram. Several kilometres (miles) of abandoned tramroads weave around the hill and two major inclines link this high-level network to the former Swansea Canal in the Tawe valley below. The remains of numerous lime kilns can also be seen. Rottenstone was also worked to the north and west of Cribarth.

== Access ==
Other than its lower eastern flanks, the entire hill is open country and therefore available for walkers to wander over at will. Various public footpaths and bridleways provide access over its lower slopes from the communities in the upper Swansea Valley such as Abercraf, Ynyswen and Pen-y-Cae. A popular ascent of the hill is by way of a concessionary path starting near Craig-y-Nos Castle.
