= Landore Viaduct =

Railway viaduct in Landore, Wales

Coordinates: 51.645304°N 3.934042°W

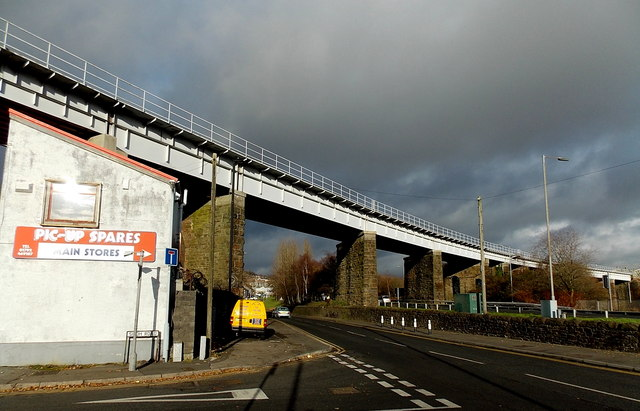
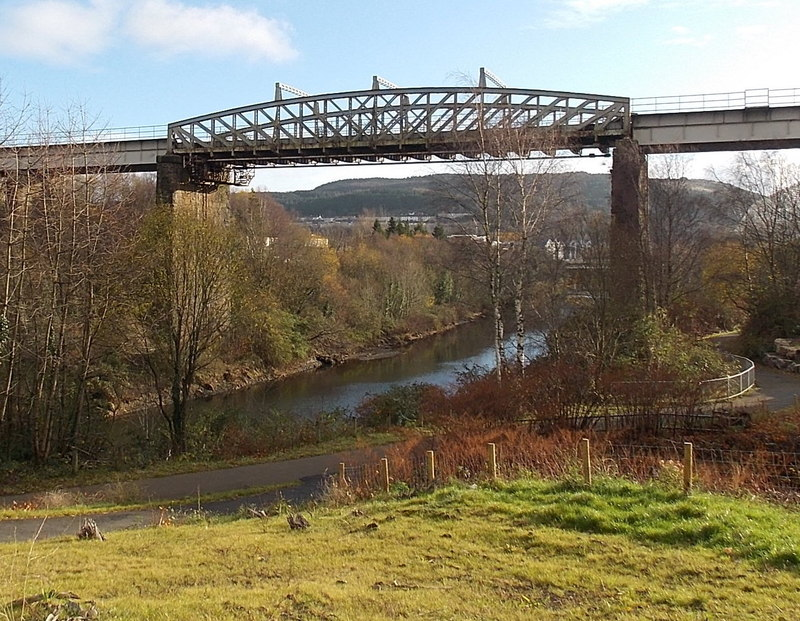
Landore viaduct

The Landore viaduct is a railway viaduct over the Swansea valley and the River Tawe at Landore in South Wales. It provides a link between Swansea city center and the West Wales Line to the South Wales Main Line. The valley crossing provides a panoramic view of Landore, Kilvey Hill, the Liberty Stadium and the Swansea Enterprise Park.

The Landore viaduct was constructed as a key element of the West Wales Line during the late 1840s. The structure, which has a length of 536-metre (1,759 ft), was originally designed by the famed engineer Isambard Kingdom Brunel, and incorporated a diverse range of structural design elements and was primarily constructed out of timber. It was officially opened to traffic in 1850. The structure was first updated in 1889, using wrought-iron for the central span. Between 1978 and 1979, the majority of the viaduct was re-decked using steel beams. The structure remains in use to the current day.

== History ==
=== Background and design ===
During the mid-1840s, work commenced upon the construction of the South Wales Railway, which was being pursued with the goal of connecting Gloucester and the Great Western Railway to key sites throughout South Wales, especially the envisioned ferry traffic at Fishguard, Pembrokeshire. Headed by the noted civil engineer Isambard Kingdom Brunel, the line initially opened during 1850 through to the city of Swansea, although construction activity continued on other sections for decades more. The arrival of the railway had the effect of eclipsed the Swansea Canal as the major transport artery in the region.

To connect what is now commonly known as the South Wales Main Line with both the Swansea city center and the West Wales Line, it was necessary to construct a crossing of the River Tawe. Following the surveying of the local landscape, it was decided that the optimum site was located around 4.8 kilometres (3.0 mi) north of the river mouth in Swansea Bay. The selected means of crossing the river valley was a viaduct, which was designed by Brunel himself. Its design incorporated two sizable approaches; the western approach, which was curved at a radius of 402.3 metres (1,320 ft), possessed a gradient of 1 in 264, while the straight eastern approach has a gradient of 1 in 109.

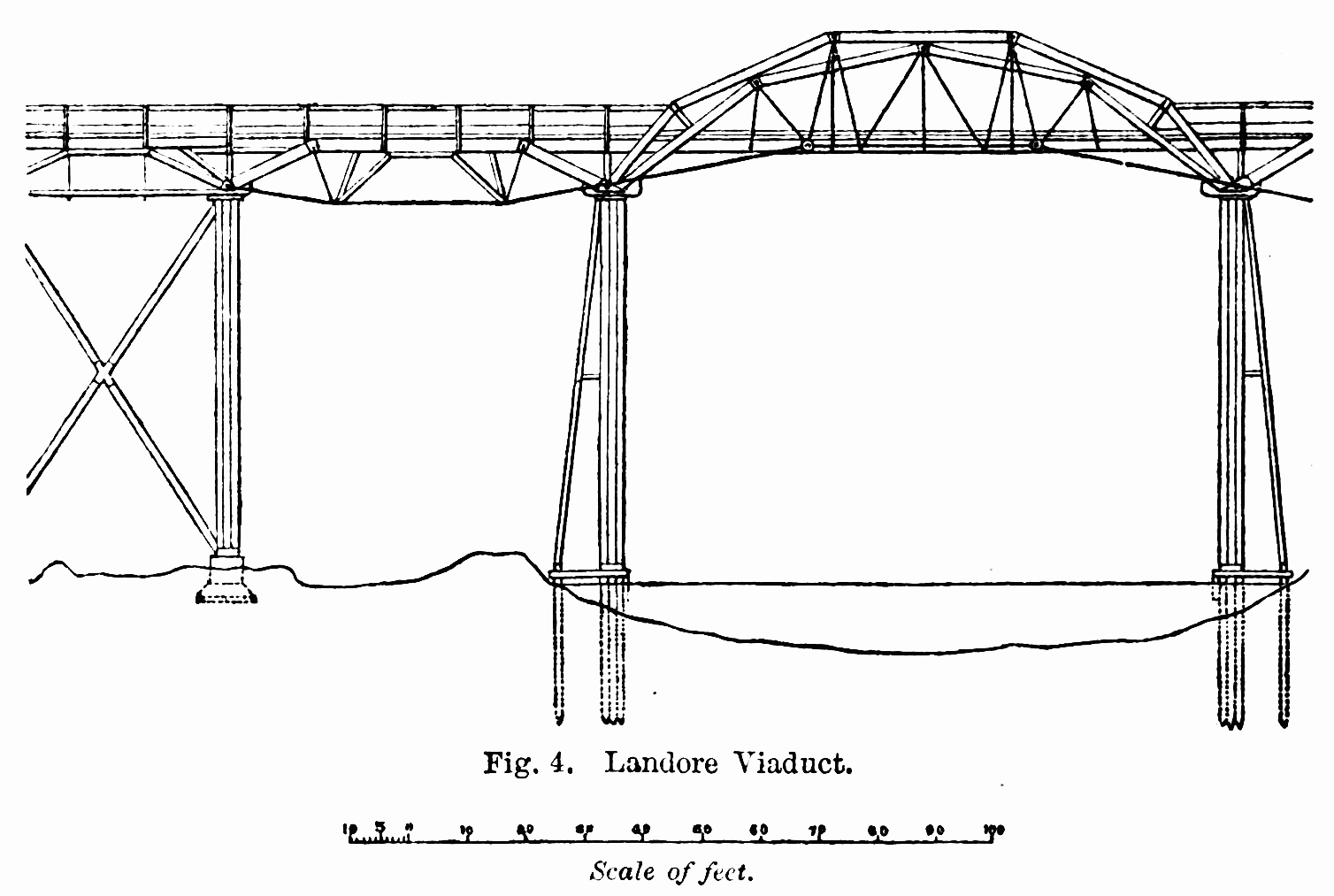
Elevation of side arch and main span

The viaduct possessed a length of 536.4 metres (1,760 ft), comprising 37 arches in total. The span of these arches varied significantly in places; largest of which being 33.5 metres (110 ft) to cross over the River Tawe itself. The arches to the immediate sides of the main span measured 19.5 metres (64 ft); furthermore, a pair of 22.3 m (73 ft) arches were included to cross over the Swansea Canal and one road, and two spans of 15.2 m (50 ft) crossed other roads. The majority of the arches had widths of between 12.8 and 11 metres (42 and 36 ft). The deck of the viaduct, which was composed of an arrangement of 203 mm (8.0 in) thick timbers that were topped by and directly fixed to the tracks themselves. The width between the parapets was 8.5 m (28 ft), which was wide enough to accommodate a pair of broad gauge tracks. Unlike the rest of the structure, the main span of the viaduct was composed of separate structures for each track.

The superstructure of the viaduct was mainly composed of timber, which is believed to have been Canadian pitch pine, augmented with wrought iron fixtures and pinnings. In order that additional headroom could be provided above the Tawe, a requirement of the Act of Parliament associated with the viaduct's construction, a bowspring truss was used for the largest span over the river to provide a peak height of 33.7 metres (111 ft). This span consisting of two concentric polygonal arches composed of double timbers, each being 330 by 356 mm (13.0 by 14.0 in). In comparison, the other spans followed a beam format, placing their trusses beneath the viaduct's deck. Both the viaduct's abutments and the five rectilinear-plan piers located to the west of the river, each featuring two round-arch openings, were composed of masonry. The rest of the piers consisted of timber trestles that were arranged from 406 mm (16.0 in) square uprights, complete with two, three or four legs founded on either timber piles or masonry pads; the difference in the number of legs used being dependent upon the specific ground conditions for each pier.

=== Construction ===
The responsibility for overseeing the viaduct's construction was assigned to Lavington Evans Fletcher, who was one of Brunel's assistants. The resident engineer was Robert Brodie and the assistant resident engineer was one Samuel Jones; George Hennet was appointed as the contractor for its construction. The steelwork for the structure was produced by Chepstow-based manufacturer Edward D. Finch & Co., and the wrought iron elements were made locally by Palmer of Neath.

Prior to the commencement of construction, a relatively expensive land acquisition phase had to be conducted; there were a large number of buildings that fell directly in the path of the viaduct. Further difficulties were presented by the ground itself; due to the presence of earlier mining activities, the soil's stability had been negatively affected in some areas. On the eastern bank of the river, the ground was effectively marshland, being historically prone to flooding from the Tawe during the spring. Thus, the design of both the foundations and the piers of the viaduct were designed to achieve the necessary stability in spite of these unfavourable footings.

During October 1847, pile driving for the viaduct's foundations had commenced. By May 1848, work on the masonry of the west abutment was recorded as having been completed. On 30 May 1850, the locomotive Hercules and its tender became the first train to cross over the completed viaduct. On 18 June 1850, the structure was officially opened to traffic, being used by the first train between Chepstow and Swansea during the same day. Reportedly, the Landore Viaduct had cost roughly £28,720 to construct.

=== Rebuilding and maintenance ===
Between September 1886 and October 1889, the viaduct was subject to its first modification programme. Dependent upon opinion, this programme could be viewed as an effective replacement of the original structure. During this work, the superstructure was reconfigured to a 22-span configuration, which was supported on additional masonry piers. A reduction in the viaduct's length was achieved via the deliberate embanking of the eastern approach using slag from the nearby Hafod Copperworks. A single steel truss was used to replace the original river span, while the remainder were rebuilt using wrought iron. According to an account in the Western Mail published on 5 October 1889, the cost of these alterations came to £30,000.

Between 1978 and 1979, the nationalised railway operator British Rail undertook another series of modifications, including the replacement of the wrought iron deck girders with new steel beams. As a result of multiple alterations to the structure, all that survives of Brunel's viaduct are the five original masonry piers located to the west of the Tawe. In addition, several stumps of the timber piers can be found the river bed while some sections of hidden timberwork remain but had been entombed by the 19th century extension of the viaduct's eastern embankment.
