= Upper Clydach River =

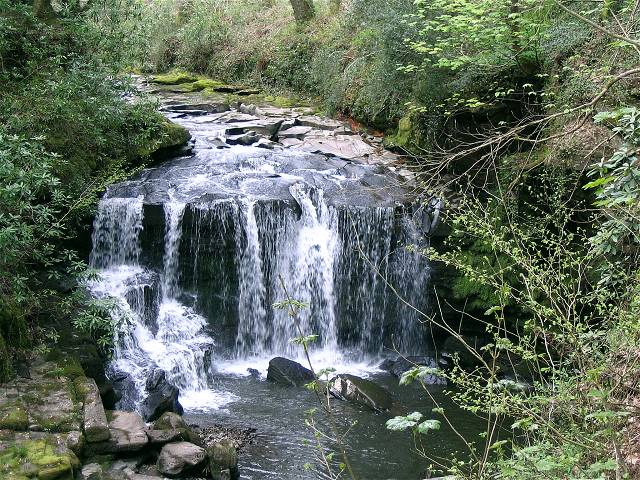
Waterfall on the Upper Clydach river

The Upper Clydach River runs from a poorly drained area south of Cwmgors and flows south and southeast through Cwm Gors for about 7 km to join the River Tawe at Pontardawe - 51.71775°N 3.84873°W. Each of the rivers bearing the name 'Clydach' in South Wales is thought to derive from an earlier Celtic word 'klou' or 'kleu' together with the suffix '-ach' which is of Irish origin. The sense is of a 'strong-flowing', 'washing' or stony river.
