= John Christie (industrialist) =

Scottish industrialist (1774–1858)

- Born: 1774
- Died: 1858 (aged 83–84)
- Occupation: industrialist

John Christie (1774–1858), was an early industrialist born in Scotland. He is chiefly remembered for his agricultural and industrial activities in South Wales during the early part of the nineteenth century. Christie amassed a fortune through the indigo trade with India and invested it in the purchase of much of Fforest Fawr in what is now the Brecon Beacons National Park in southern Powys. He constructed a network of tramroads between Sennybridge and the upper Swansea Valley, initially with a view to supplying the model farms which he had established with agricultural lime. Connections to coal mines further south were established and to sources of rottenstone and silica sand but these ventures bankrupted him by 1827-28.
