= Clydach, Swansea =

Village and community in Swansea, Wales

Clydach
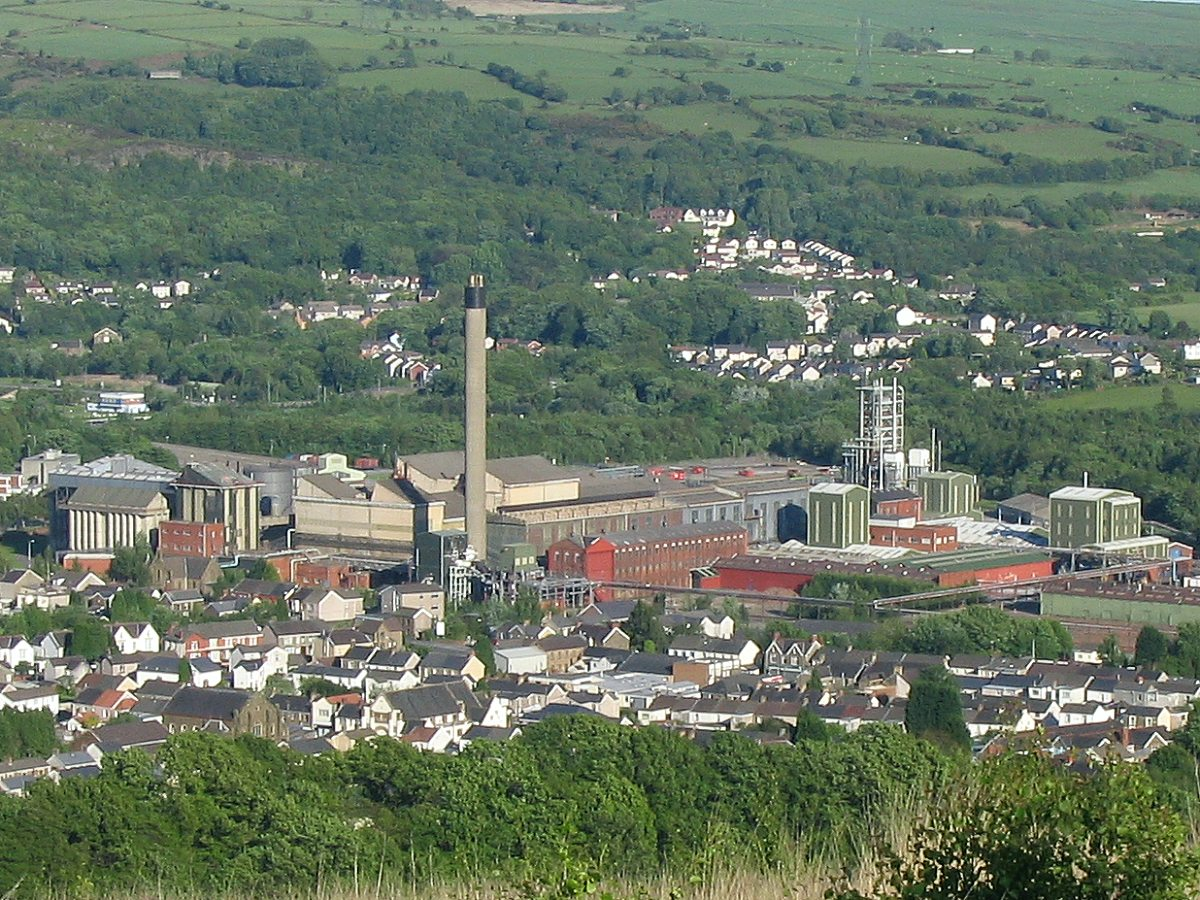
- Clydach nickel refinery

- Location within Swansea
- Population: 7,503
- OS grid reference: SN689013
- Community: Clydach
- Principal area: Swansea
- Preserved county: West Glamorgan
- Country: Wales
- Sovereign state: United Kingdom
- Post town: SWANSEA
- Postcode district: SA6
- Dialling code: 01792
- Police: South Wales
- Fire: Mid and West Wales
- Ambulance: Welsh
- UK Parliament: Gower
- Senedd Cymru – Welsh Parliament: Gower
- List of places UK Wales Swansea 51.69°N 03.91°W Map of the community

Clydach is a village and community in Swansea, Wales, within the Clydach ward and the Llangyfelach parish. It is located 6 miles (9.7 km) northeast of Swansea city centre. In 2011, the population was 7,503. Welsh is the first language of 24 per cent of the population and both Welsh and English language schools are available. The village lies close to the M4 motorway which can be accessed via the bypass or old road via Ynystawe. The community includes part of the village of Glais.

== History ==
In the 1800s, Clydach was a very small community if it could even be called that. Maps from then show Clydach to consist of sub-areas namely 'Mount Pleasant' (the area by high street shops), 'Faerdre' (covering the area nearest to Vardre Road), 'Down' the area that was once 'Down Farm' which is now land laying behind the Farmer's Arms, Clydach and below 'Ty gwyn Road'. There was also an area called Ty Gwyn as Ty Gwyn/White House was present on the land. The road leading to Ty Gwyn is now Ty Gwyn Road and also 'Coed Cae-Du' near Craig Cefn Parc.

The map of c. 1878 Clydach (which can be viewed at the Archive Service at Swansea Civic Centre) shows that number 1 St John's Road was originally the old 'St John's School for Girls, Boys and Infants', which was linked to St John's Church near the shops at Capel Buildings near the Mond. A second school is shown where the current building of Clydach Infants stands which is also for girls/boys and infants.

On a map dated 1899 Clydach has grown substantially to have a larger community base with the school on Twyn-y-Bedw Road being expended upon and a second school being built just a little farther up the same street. The St John's School was by this point being used as a Sunday school and not for general education. There was a Clydach woollen factory not far from the schools on a road named 'Prince Llewellyn Street' or as it is now known 'Factory Road'. St Mary's Church is not on this map and is shown as a blank open space.

In 1918 the Sunday school is still showing on the map under the area name of Vardre close to Mount Pleasant and Graig Felin was known as Aber-Clydach. The top of Clydach near Lone Road and Bryn Mair was named Upper Forge not yet having its slang title of 'Sunny Bank' with the locals. Note: Sunny Bank does not appear by name on any maps seen to date (June 2012).

In the early 19th century, Clydach was a small village in the Swansea Valley. As the coal in the South Wales Valleys was a valuable commodity during the Industrial Revolution, Clydach experienced growth as a through road for transporting goods between Swansea and the many mines and heavy metal industries. The 16-mile (26 km) long Swansea Canal was built through the centre of Clydach between 1794 and 1798. It was constructed to transport up to 400,000 tonnes of coal a year from Ystalyfera to Swansea port. The canal remained profitable until 1902, when losses were first reported. This decline in revenue and profits was largely due to the competition from its rival the Swansea Vale Railway. The last commercial cargo carried on the Swansea Canal was in 1931 when coal was conveyed from Clydach to Swansea. Boats continued to operate on the canal after that date but only for maintenance work, with horse-drawn boats last recorded in Clydach in 1958. Only 5 miles (8.0 km) of the canal's original length of 16 miles (26 km) remain.

== Population ==
The end of the 19th century and the early 20th century saw a significant growth in the village's population. With the opening of the Mond in 1902 the village experienced significant growth as the factory became the main employer within the village. The figures below show the population for the parish of Rhyndwyglydach from 1881 to 1971.

Year	Population
1881	3,529
1891	4,018
1901	4,462
1911	6,994
1921	8,789
1931	9,444
1951	9,214
1961	8,566
1971	8,449

The population has recovered from the reduction seen in the early 1980s following the demise of mining and the heavy metal industries. The village's population was approximately 7,500 on 23 February 2010 and a population of 10,830 on 28 July 2011. The population of Clydach, Glamorgan, Wales, UK on 6 May 2012 is approximately 12,593.

== Health care ==
The town benefited from Clydach War Memorial Hospital until it closed in 2015. The main redbrick building was converted into apartments for ex-servicemen and women in 2017. Eight houses and two bungalows have been built on the land as part of an affordable housing scheme led by Pobl Group, a homeless charity operating in South Wales.

== Retail ==
=== High Street ===
The centre of Clydach High Street, the main commercial area of the town has had major investments in improving its facilities. These include reshaping and resurfacing of the road, new flagstones to replace tarmac pavements, new trees, new seats and cycle racks. Work was commissioned by Cwmni Clydach Development Trust, with funding for the schemes provided by the Welsh Development Agency and Swansea City Council. A grant of over £130,000 was made available for local high street businesses to improve the frontage to their stores.

== Industry ==
=== Clydach refinery ===
Clydach refinery, known as 'the Mond', was built by Ludwig Mond the inventor of the nickel carbonyl process at the turn of the 20th century. It started production in 1902. It is Europe’s largest nickel refinery. It is 100% owned by Vale and produces nickel powder, nickel pellets and other various nickel-coated materials. It also has a nickel foam production plant that until recently was the sole provider of the nickel foam required in the power cells of the Toyota Prius; production has since moved to a plant in China.

The plant was the heart of the village and one of the largest employers in the Swansea Valley for many years. By 1910 over 40% of the village's population worked in the refinery. Today, with improvements in processing and a rationalisation of products, the refinery now employs just over 240 people, equating to 3% of the village's population.

The refinery has been progressive in ensuring the reduction of emissions and pollutants. The River Tawe, which runs alongside the refinery, is once again home to breeding salmon and trout. The refinery is, however, a top-tier Control of Major Accident Hazard Regulations (COMAH) site, due to the inherent nature of its process.

== Religion ==
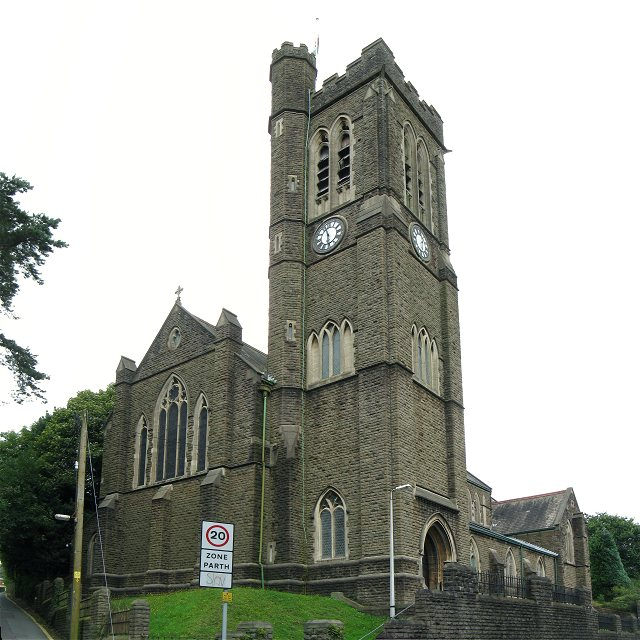
St Mary's Church

There are a number of churches and chapels in Clydach, serving both English and Welsh language speakers. Clydach is a parish of the Church in Wales, the parish church being St. Mary's on High Street. Other English language churches include Lighthouse Church (Assemblies of God), Bethel Evangelical Church, and St. Benedicts (Roman Catholic). Two Welsh language chapels remain in Clydach: Calfaria (Welsh Baptist) and Capel y Nant (Welsh Independents). Capel y Nant was formed in 2008 and meets at the former Carmel Chapel. The church was created through the uniting of Hebron and Carmel Independent Chapels. Capel y Nant also welcomes members of Salem Fardre Presbyterian Church, and is in partnership with Clydach English language Methodist Church.

A number of Welsh-speaking churches/chapels in the community have recently closed, though their buildings still remain. These include St. John's (High Street), Hebron (Hebron Road) which is now being converted into a dwelling house by a local resident, whose family have lived in the village for the past 100 years. Also in Clydach is Bethania English Baptist Church, Graig-felin. The Reverend Valentine Evans, who wrote the History of Clydach at the beginning of the 20th century, is buried in its cemetery. A Kingdom Hall of Jehovah's Witnesses located on Capel Road is one of the oldest in Wales.

== Notable people ==
- Harold Elgan Rees (born 5 January 1954) - rugby union player.
- Sir Ludwig Mond (7 March 1839 – 11 December 1907) - chemist and industrialist.
- Rhys Williams (Welsh actor) (31 December 1897 – 28 May 1969) - known for How Green was my Valley.
- Derek Bevan MBE (born 19 June 1947) - rugby world cup final referee.

== Leisure and learning ==
=== Mond Valley Golf Club ===
Originally a nine-hole course (dating back to the 1960s) that was intended to be a resource exclusively for INCO (Clydach Refinery) employees, the course now welcomes golfers of all ages and abilities throughout the year.

The club is nestled in the historic Swansea Valley bordered on one side by the River Tawe and by the Swansea Canal. It was renamed Mond Valley Golf Club in May 2012 after Vale Europe outsourced the management.

=== Forge Fach Community Resource Centre ===
Following the demolition of the old Clydach swimming pool, the Cwmni Clydach Development Trust, commissioned a new multi purpose community resource centre at Forge Fach, at a cost of approximately £1.8 million, funded by the Welsh Assembly Government, City & County of Swansea & Clydach Community Council. Forge Fach is situated next to the Forge Fach Waterfalls, part of the Lower Clydach River, which runs into the Tawe River and gave Clydach its original name, Clydach-on-Tawe. Clydach is the equivalent of the Irish word Cladaugh, meaning sandy bend/strand. The centre opened in 2006. It provides a range of facilities including a community café, a full day care nursery (Forge Fach Day Nursery), a multi-purpose hall, ICT suite, training & conferencing facilities plus an external multi-use games area. In addition there are a number of fully serviced offices rented by local businesses.

The City & County of Swansea's Lifelong Learning department & Swansea University's Dept of Adult Continuing Education use the centre to run a number of adult education classes . In 2011 the City & County of Swansea opened the 'Waterfall View' day service at Forge Fach.

In 2013, Cwmni Clydach Development Trust went into administration, leaving the future of Forge Fach uncertain. Swansea Council has assumed temporary control of the facility.

A local campaign group called for Forge Fach to be turned into a health, leisure, wellbeing and swimming centre.

In October 2015, the resource centre was taken over by Walsingham Support, a national disability charity, supporting adults with learning disabilities, brain injury and complex health needs.

=== Dynamic Rock ===
2006 saw the opening of the Old Public Hall, which was converted into an indoor climbing centre and was renamed 'Dynamic Rock'. It is now home to the Swansea Indoor Climbing Centre. The walls are 12m high and feature overhangs, slabs, pillars, arêtes and arches.

=== Cwm Clydach ===
The Cwm Clydach RSPB Reserve is situated on the outskirts of the village, en route to Craig Cefn Parc near the New Inn pub.

The Cwm Clydach nature reserve used to be the home to the Nixon and Bell Drift mine. It was affectionately known as Nixon's and was one of the main employers until 1960–1961. It was used after as a pumping station.

The colliery was a rock top colliery and there was even a steam boiler underground, which was rare in a colliery.

Little remains of the colliery now, and there is a walk up the valley past other remnants of other NCB and private mines.

=== Cycling ===
Clydach is served by National Cycle Route 43. Major work has recently been undertaken on part of the cycle route between Clydach and Glais. The lottery-funded Sustrans laid a new tarmac path for pedestrians and cyclists, which begins alongside the River Tawe, behind the Vardre Rugby Club, and ends at Station Road in Glais. The tarmac path was mainly built on space used by abandoned railway tracks. Clydach National cycle route 43, leads into Morriston. A small portion of which is shared with a road, the sub section by Vardre Rugby Club. Not to be confused with the path in which leads to Glais, it is to the right.

=== Education ===
Clydach Primary school and Graigfelen Primary schools are the main primary schools for residents. There is also a Welsh medium primary school, Ysgol Gynradd Gymraeg Gellionnen, on Gellionnen Road, and a Roman Catholic primary school, St Joseph's, on Pontardawe Road. As of September 2012, Clydach Infants and Clydach Juniors are now one school (Clydach Primary School).

The village used to be home to Cwmtawe Lower Comprehensive School. It was the junior part of a three-school system, the other partners being Gwaen-Cae-Gurwen Lower School and Cwmtawe Upper School in Pontardawe. The lower schools were for 11- to 13-year-olds while the last three years of compulsory education were provided in Pontardawe.

Today Clydach is in the catchment area of Birchgrove Comprehensive School. However, many students from Clydach attend Cwmtawe Community School in Pontardawe.

=== Sport ===
==== Football ====
Clydach currently has two football clubs: Clydach F.C., currently playing in the third-tier Ardal South West; and Clydach Sports, currently playing in the Neath & District League.

Clydach F.C. were established in 2021 by a merger of two former Clydach clubs - Clydach Cricket and FC Clydach.

In the past teams such as Inco and Sunnybank WMC from Clydach had also competed in the Neath & District League.

==== Rugby ====
Vardre RFC is a sporting venue in Clydach and Clydach's younger residents train out on the pitches behind the building over the canal. They have first, second, youth and junior teams. The first team currently play in division 1 of the WRU West Central League.
