= Rotten stone =

Powdered rock used for polishing

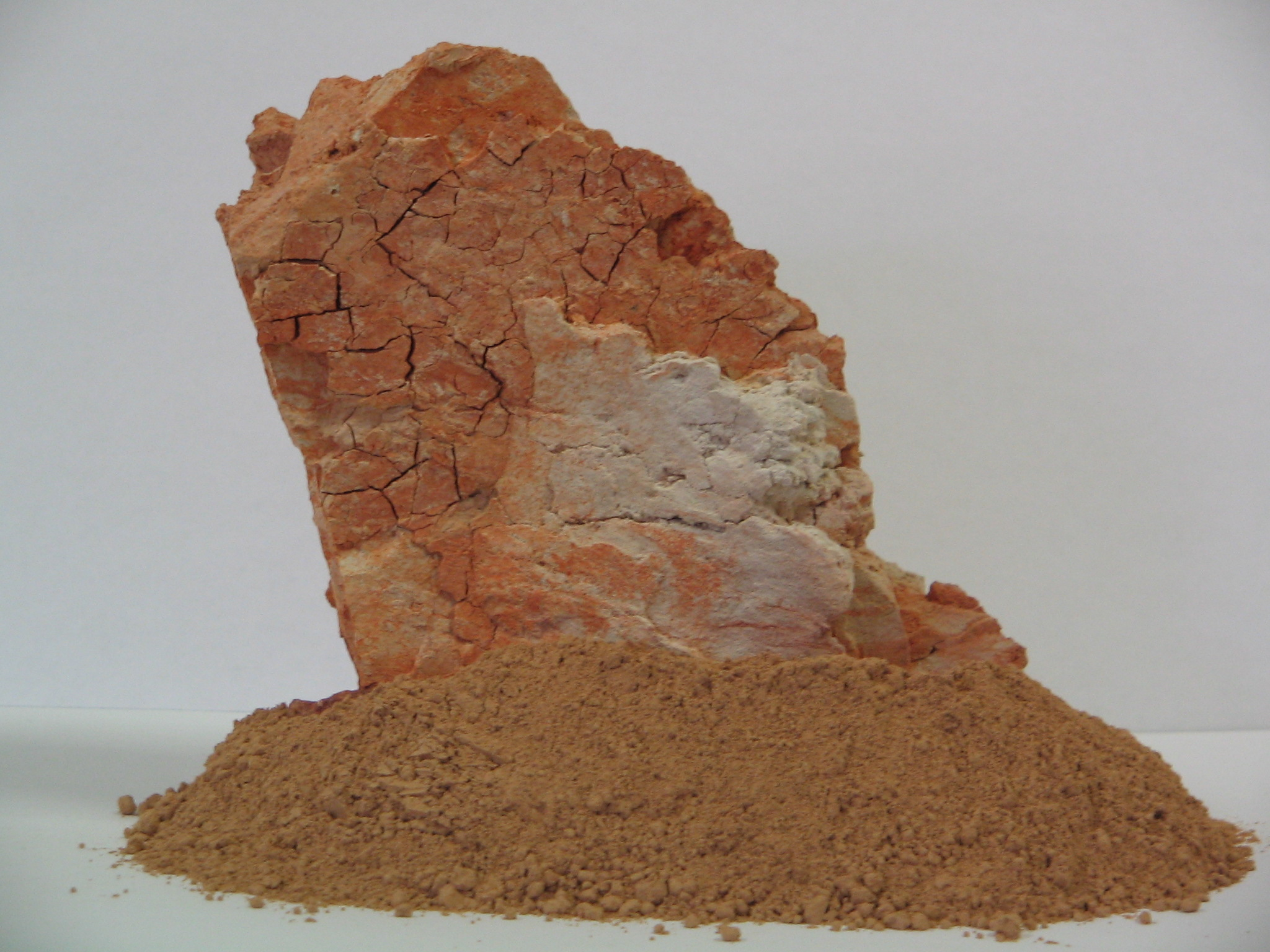
Tripoli mineral

Rotten stone, sometimes spelled as rottenstone, also known as tripoli, is fine powdered porous rock used as a polishing abrasive for metal smithing, historically for the grinding of optical lenses and in woodworking. It is usually weathered limestone mixed with diatomaceous, amorphous, or crystalline silica. It has similar applications to pumice, but it is generally sold as a finer powder and used for a more glossy polish after an initial treatment with coarser pumice powder. Tripoli particles are rounded rather than sharp, making it a milder abrasive.

It is usually mixed with oil, sometimes water, and rubbed on the surface of varnished or lacquered wood with a felt pad or cloth. Rotten stone is sometimes used to buff stains out of wood. Some polishing waxes contain powdered rotten stone in a paste substrate. For larger polishing jobs, rotten stone mixed with a binder is applied to polishing wheels.

It has also been used to polish brass, such as that found on military uniforms, as well as steel and other metals. Plates used in daguerreotypes were polished using rotten stone, the finest abrasive available at the time.

It is also used to polish jewelry and in toothpastes. Its more common use is as a filler, as used in plastics, paint and rubber.

== Sources ==
Rottenstone has been extensively worked in South Wales along the outcrop of the Carboniferous Limestone, particularly within the Brecon Beacons National Park. It occurs at the top of the sequence where the Upper Limestone Shales have been weathered. Innumerable workings were initiated and later abandoned during the course of the nineteenth century, leaving a characteristic terrain of humps and hollows. A notable example is that on the flanks of Cribarth exploited by industrial entrepreneur John Christie.

In the United States it is mainly produced in Arkansas, Illinois, and Oklahoma.

== See also ==
- Metal polishing
- Pumice
- Wood finishing
