= Swansea Valley =

Valley of the River Tawe in Wales

Coordinates: 51.7593°N 3.7898°W

The Swansea Valley (Welsh: Cwm Tawe; lit. 'Tawe Valley') is one of the South Wales Valleys. It is the valley from the Brecon Beacons National Park to the sea at Swansea of the River Tawe in Wales. Administration of the area is divided between the City and County of Swansea, Neath Port Talbot County Borough, and Powys. A distinction may be drawn between the Lower Swansea Valley and the Upper Swansea Valley; the former was more heavily industrialised during the 19th and 20th centuries.

== Settlements and transport ==
Towns and villages include Clydach, Pontardawe, Ystradgynlais, Ystalyfera and Abercraf. In its September 2005 document Towards a Valleys Strategy, Neath Port Talbot County Borough Council noted that a marked divide existed between the more remote communities at Ystalyfera and along the Twrch and Amman valleys and the reasonably prosperous southern communities of Pontardawe, Alltwen, Rhos, and Trebanos.

The area has had no rail connection since passenger services on the Swansea Vale Railway line between Swansea and Brynamman via Ystalyfera ceased in 1952.

The A4067 road links Swansea and Brecon.

== Attractions ==
The Upper Swansea Valley is the site of Dan yr Ogof Caves, claimed to be the largest show cave complex in Western Europe. South of Abercrave, the valley was formerly a region of heavy industry including coal mining and iron-making and there is plenty of the industrial heritage surviving; the Swansea Canal was built along the valley in the late 18th century to serve the nascent local industries. In 1878 opera singer Adelina Patti made her home at Craig-y-Nos Castle.
