= Ystalyfera =

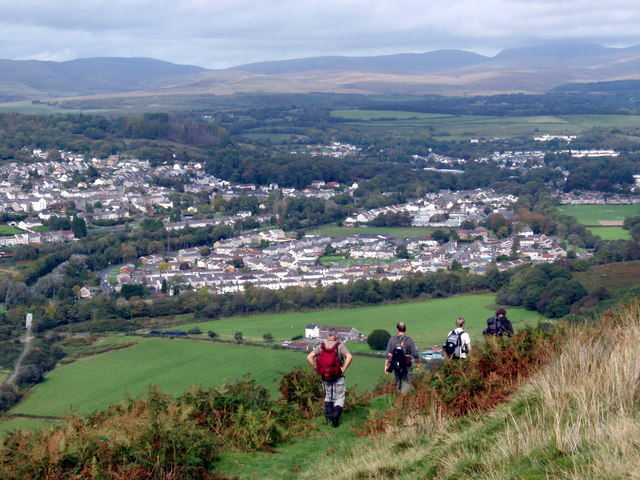
- Ystalyfera from Varteg Hill

- Location within Neath Port Talbot
- Population: 3,019 (2011 census)
- OS grid reference: SN767089
- Principal area: Neath Port Talbot
- Preserved county: West Glamorgan
- Country: Wales
- Sovereign state: United Kingdom
- Post town: SWANSEA
- Postcode district: SA9
- Dialling code: 01639
- Police: South Wales
- Fire: Mid and West Wales
- Ambulance: Welsh
- UK Parliament: Brecon, Radnor and Cwm Tawe,
- Senedd Cymru – Welsh Parliament: Neath
- Councillors: Alun Llewelyn (Plaid Cymru)
- List of places UK Wales Neath Port Talbot 51.764°N 3.786°W Map of the community

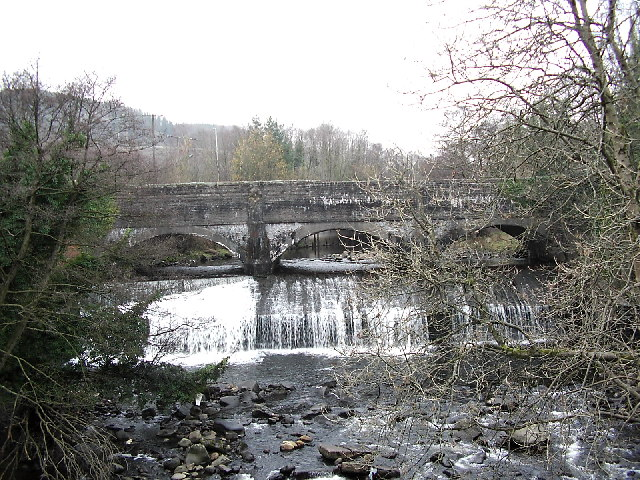
Swansea Canal Aqueduct at Ystalyfera

Ystalyfera is a former industrial village and community in the upper Swansea Valley, on the River Tawe, about 13 miles (21 km) northeast of Swansea. It is an electoral ward and a community in the unitary authority of Neath Port Talbot, Wales, comprising a resident population of just over 3,000 people, approximately 60% of whom speak Welsh.

National Cycle Route 43 passes through the village.

== History ==
The history of Ystalyfera begins with a small farming family who shared the land. This is reflected in the village's name, composed from the Welsh words, ynys (meaning island), tal (meaning tall) and berran (a composite of ber and rhan, indicating a land-share – a short piece of shared land, probably between agricultural labourers). The history of the name can be seen as it evolved through the ages: -

- 1582 Ynys Tal y Feran
- 1604 Tir Ynystalferran
- 1797 Stalyfera Issa, Ycha, Genol
- 1831 Ystalyfera

Ystalyfera grew as a village with the advent of coal mining and iron working which, together with copper working, were important industries in the Swansea Valley.

In 1838 a furnace was built by James Palmer Budd at Ystalyfera and from this grew the iron and tinplate works which by 1863 was described as “the largest tinplate manufactory in the world”. A new cold-blast process was successfully introduced here and, despite some early crises, the works prospered. By the mid-1850s there were 40 furnaces for puddling and balling in operation and 16 tin mills and houses. The output of iron increased from 4,893 tons in 1843 to 29,828 tons in 1858. The works continued to grow during the 1860s and reached peak production in 1872 with the sale of 182,000 boxes of tinplate.

However, the years of prosperity were limited. The 1870s saw little addition to the plant of the works. Steel had now come to challenge iron on a larger scale, new methods of production demanded the energy, technical skill and financial capital which the ageing J. P. Budd at Ystalyfera could not supply. The works continued to operate during the 1870s, but with Budd's death in 1880 the end was in sight. By this time the works were incurring heavy losses and late in 1885 the works finally closed. For more than 40 years the works had been the colossus of the district and, more than anything else, had been responsible for the transformation of the latter's economic basis and social structure. Less significant in their contribution were the two ironworks, at Pontardawe and Brynamman, though both became substantial producers of tinplate from the 1860s.

The expansion in iron production inevitably created a heavy demand for local coal. The middle decades of the 19th century saw the expansion of existing mines and the sinking of new ones in the parish and the neighbouring districts.

With the closure of the iron works and later the coalmines, Ystalyfera suffered very heavily on the economic front. Through the 20th century, the village rebuilt and redefined its role. At present, there are small businesses that run in the village. Many of the village's residents commute to Swansea or Neath to work.

== Gurnos Chapel ==
The first chapel was constructed between 1839 and 1840 by Wesleyans. In 1858 the chapel was purchased by Congregationalists and in 1864 was rebuilt. The chapel was rebuilt again in 1913–14. Between 1884 and 1922 the minister was Reverend John Thomas.

In about 1900 the chapel had an organ built and installed by Conacher and Co of Huddersfield. In August 1915 an organ recital was given by Professor Firmin Swinnen, organist of Antwerp Cathedral in Belgium.

The Chapel celebrated its centenary in 1957. In 2011 it was sold into private ownership, with the owners allowing a food bank to operate from the premises.

== Present ==
The village has Welsh language schools at both primary school and comprehensive school level. The Wern (English: Alder) Primary School, which was established at the end of the 19th century and Ysgol Gyfun Ystalyfera, the latter having consistently good examination results. These schools reflect the high proportion of Welsh speakers in the area.

Ystalyfera is home to Ystalyfera RFC – a rugby union club, which is an integral part of the village – and a cricket team. The village was home to two cinemas, as well as one just outside the boundary, which were all later demolished.

Ystalyfera is also the home to the Wern Fawr public house, and its Bryncelyn Brewery. A brewery used to exist on site and produced the Champion Beer of Wales in 2002/3 and 2003/4, coming 3rd in 2004/5. All of the beers produced had a Buddy Holly theme, these are now brewed by the '9 Lives Brewing' company which is no longer located on site.

=== Population breakdown ===
- Population density (People / sq mi): 2.8 (24.9 for UK)
- Females / male: 1.07 (1.05 for UK)
- Average commute: 12.03 miles (8.73 miles for UK)
- Average age: 41 (39 for UK)
- Home ownership: 12% (16.9% for UK)
- Student population: 2% (4.4% for UK)
- People in good health: 58% (69% for UK)
- People in bad health: 42% (53% for UK)

== Government and politics ==
The electoral ward of Ystalyfera is a division of Neath Port Talbot county borough and consists of some or all of the following settlements: Ystalyfera and Gurnos in the parliamentary constituency of Neath. The ward consists of a dense settlement to the east and north around the A4067 road in the Swansea Valley. An area of woodland lies to the west and the rest of the ward consists of open moorland with a few farms.

Ystalyfera is bounded to the north by the county of Powys, within which the wards of Cwmtwrch (north) and the Ynyscedwyn Ward of Ystradgynlais (northeast) are located. The Rhos ward (southeast), Godre'r Graig (south), Pontardawe (southwest) and Cwmllynfell ward (northwest), all sit within the county of Neath Port Talbot.
