= Lower Swansea valley =

River valley in Wales

Coordinates: 51.67559°N 3.91592°W

The Lower Swansea Valley (Welsh: Cwm Tawe Isaf) is the lower half of the valley of the River Tawe in south Wales. It runs from approximately the level of Clydach down to Swansea docks, where it opens into Swansea Bay and the Bristol Channel. This relatively small area was a focus of industrial innovation and invention during the Industrial Revolution, leading to a transformation of the landscape and a rapid rise in the population and economy of Swansea.

Today the area is in the final stages of regeneration. Modern Industrial units and housing has replaced the pollution of the metallurgical industry and the area is now the home of Championship football club Swansea City A.F.C. and Welsh Rugby Union region Ospreys. Railway lines which criss-crossed the valley have now been replaced by pleasant walking and cycling paths and the River Tawe now hosts canoeists instead of copper barges.

== History ==
Over a period of about 150 years up until the 1920s, the open valley of the River Tawe became one of the most heavily industrialised areas of the developed world. There were a number of reasons that favoured the great expansion of industry in this particular location. The general exploitation of coal in the South Wales coalfield of the South Wales Valleys had revealed seams of steam coal and anthracite close to the surface in the Upper Swansea Valley and these were easily exploited by shallow drift mining or open cast mining. Smelting metals required more than three parts of coal to every one part of metal ore, so it was of major economic benefit to have easily available, high quality coal. Swansea also had a good port and safe anchorage. The combination of these two factors meant that it was financially more viable to bring the ore to Swansea's coal than take the coal to the ore. In addition, the very high tidal ranges at Swansea allowed deep draught ships to access the river mouth. This allowed large quantities of raw materials to be brought in (allowing further profit through economies of scale) and, more importantly, the finished products, such as sheet copper, tinplate, alum, porcelain and coal to be exported.

The technologies involved in iron making had already been developed and refined, and skilled craftsmen were readily available to extend the newly developing industry. Swansea was already a town of significant size which could provide the required workforce. The growth of the industry in the Lower Swansea Valley itself caused a great expansion in the population of Swansea and nearby Neath. A number of wealthy entrepreneurs, scientists and engineers of considerable ability were drawn to Swansea during this period, which in turn, promoted great innovation in the industrial processes.

Initially, the smelting works concentrated on copper. Coal was brought down to them by waggonways and tramways; copper ore was brought on ships which could sail right up to the works; and the resulting copper was exported out again the same way. Swansea became known as Copperopolis and the lower Tawe valley became a mass of industry. In the wake of the copper and coal industry followed pottery-making (another industry which requires large amounts of coal, together with clay and flint, which could be shipped in from the West Country); the alum industry (based on pyrites found with coal); and the manufacture of fire-clay, which was used to line furnaces.

== Copper ==
The first copper smelter directly associated was established at Landore in 1717 by John Lane and John Pollard. Pollard later went on to build the Llangyfelach copper works. In 1720 the Cambrian Works was set up near the mouth of the river and continued in production until 1745. (It reopened as a pottery in 1764.) In 1737, the White Rock copper works at Pentrechwyth was established. By 1780 there were three copper works on the east bank of the river: White Rock, Middle and Upper Bank. On the west bank there was also one at Forest. By 1800 nine copper smelters were in production in the valley. By 1860 the lower Swansea Valley was smelting two thirds of the copper ores imported to Britain, and changes in the output and economy of the Swansea Valley had a significant effect on global copper prices.

== Environmental issues ==
The extent and scale of the industrialisation that took place at a time when there almost no environmental controls in place created a legacy of chronic contamination of land and water by a great range of toxic and dangerous pollutants. The River Tawe was already being polluted by the coal mining industry and suffered badly. Even worse affected was the stream that meandered through the lower half of the valley, the Nant y Fendrod. Records about the history of this stream are sparse but it appears likely that for over 100 years most of the water was taken from this stream to be used in industry and its channel became the repository of much of the liquid waste from the various industries. In addition rainfall seeping through the growing waste tips added further burdens of by-products and waste materials.

Lithographs made at the time of the boom in industrial production show a thick smog over the valleys and the nearby towns and it reasonable to suppose that air quality was very poor both in the valley floor and in the nearby residential areas. A local doctor, Thomas Williams, wrote a book called The Effects of the Copper-Smoke in 1854. He described the landscape, atmosphere, and the complaints of local farmers.

Even in the 1980s when all the industry had long since disappeared the Nant y Fendrod was still very seriously contaminated by copper, iron, nickel, ammonia and many other contaminants.

== Recent times ==
The only remaining working industry that can trace its roots back to the industrialisation of the Lower Swansea Valley is the INCO nickel factory at Clydach known locally as The Mond. Here nickel continues (2007) to be refined using the nickel carbonyl process.

The Lower Swansea Valley Project began in the early 1960s with the aim of seeking to reclaim the land. Over the next twenty years the entire community of the area became involved in restoring the land. Redevelopment of the area provided the South Dock and Maritime Quarter and the Liberty Stadium sports complex together with the Swansea Enterprise Park industrial park which included a large lake in the course of the Nant y Fendrod designed to help mitigate the concentrations of metals in the water. The lake itself is lined with limestone. Nearly all the old buildings were cleared, with only a very few of historic interest being preserved.
