= Hafod Copperworks =

Former copperworks in Swansea, Wales

Coordinates: 51.6376°N 3.9353°W

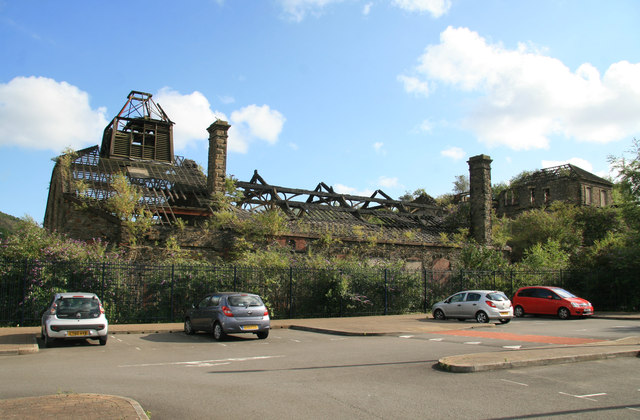
The remains of the Hafod Copperworks

The remains of the Hafod-Morfa Copperworks, originally developed by Vivian & Sons, consists of a core Grade II listed building and additional Grade II listed structures on a 12 acres (4.9 ha) site, on the banks of the River Tawe in Hafod, Swansea.

== History ==
The Hafod works was founded in 1810 by the Cornishman himself John Vivian. During the 19th century, this was the largest copper works in the world, employing over 1,000 people. The rival Morfa works was established in 1835 by Williams, Foster & Co., and the two adjacent sites combined in 1924 under Yorkshire Imperial Metals.

Swansea was core to the global copper industry, and by 1823 10,000 of Swansea's 15,000 residents were supported by the copper industry. By 1883 there were 124 works including 12 copper works in the Lower Swansea Valley. But as raw geological resources had waned in South Wales, it became more economic to produce copper elsewhere. In 1971 the Lower Swansea Valley Project had started to transform the most derelict industrial landscape in Britain, resulting in the closure of the rolling mills in 1980.

The former rolling mills were converted into the Landore Collection Centre, part of Swansea Museum.

== Reclamation and regeneration ==
In 2010, the local authority discussed plans to have the site re-developed where the listed buildings would be preserved and new uses would be given to heritage buildings. The 2010 development plan included a new hotel, restaurant and new housing.

In 2011, the local council named Swansea University as a development partner of the site, who are evaluating the possibility of developing academic facilities at the site. Public grants of £540,000 were awarded for the preservation and renewal of the site. Stage1 commenced in October 2013, clearing overgrown vegetation and undertaking essential preservation works.

In 2019, plans to re-develop the Morfa side of the site into a distillery and visitors' centre for the Penderyn brand were approved, with construction due to begin at the end of 2019, and the centre to open in 2022. The project was part-funded by a £3.75m National Lottery Heritage Fund grant. Other parts of the copper works have also been worked on; the Musgrave Engine House and Vivian Engine House were made safe with the hope of further restoration and the Morfa Bascule Bridge which served the site is planned to be returned to working condition.
