= Landore =

Landore: Welsh: Glandŵr
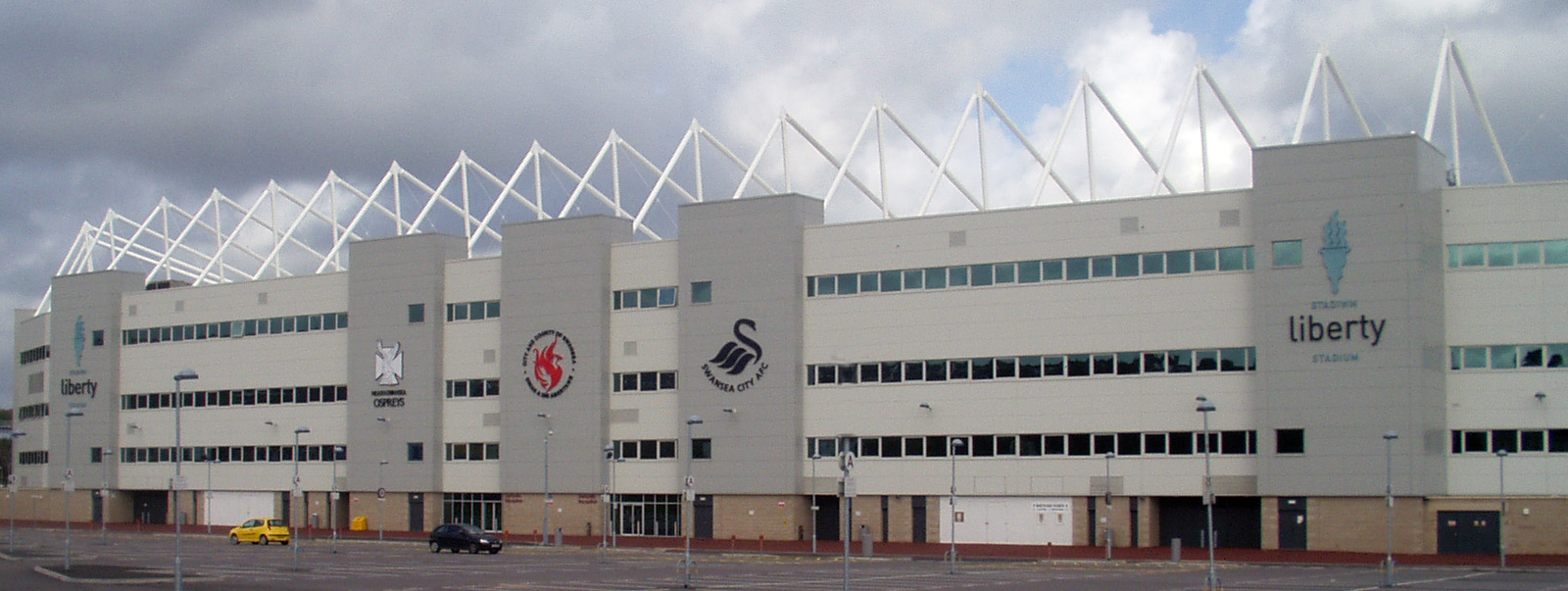
- Liberty stadium in Landore

- Location within Swansea
- Population: 6,168
- OS grid reference: SS656957
- Principal area: Swansea
- Preserved county: West Glamorgan
- Country: Wales
- Sovereign state: United Kingdom
- Post town: SWANSEA
- Postcode district: SA1
- Postcode district: SA6
- Dialling code: 01792
- Police: South Wales
- Fire: Mid and West Wales
- Ambulance: Welsh
- UK Parliament: Swansea West
- Senedd Cymru – Welsh Parliament: Swansea East
- List of places UK Wales Swansea 51.64°N 03.94°W Map of the community

Landore (Welsh: Glandŵr) is a district and community in Swansea, Wales. The district falls in the Landore council ward. A mainly residential area, it is located about 2.5 miles north of Swansea city centre. The north-easterly part of Landore is known as Morfa. There have been a number of new developments in the 21st century, such as the Liberty Stadium, now the Swansea.com Stadium, and the Morfa Shopping Park, which opened in 2005. It had a population of 6,168 as of the 2011 UK census.

== Facilities ==
A new £1.5m bowls stadium, the Landore Bowls Stadium opened in early 2008 becoming the home of the Swansea Indoor Bowls Club. The venue hosted the World Indoor Singles and Mixed Pairs Championships in April 2008.

Great Western Railway's Landore Depot is used for servicing Inter City 125 passenger trains. Landore once had a railway station, a stop on the South Wales Railway located near the Swansea Loop East Junction. The Landore Viaduct is a prominent landmark.

Landore has a park and ride with 550 spaces. The associated bus service, which is operated by First Cymru as route 501, uses a bus lane to the railway station.

In September 2013, the Swansea City Landore Training Academy was opened. The facility cost £6 million and is home to the club's reserve and academy teams, including an indoor pitch as well as grass and Artificial turf outdoor fields.

== Industrial heritage ==
The first copper works in the Swansea area was opened in Landore in 1717, and in the 1860s Carl Wilhelm Siemens perfected the open hearth furnace at a local works. By 1873 the area had one of the world's largest steelworks, and industrial pollution in Landore inspired the doggerel it came to pass in days of yore / the Devil chanced upon Landore. / Quoth he:"by all this fume and stink / I can't be far from home, I think." Landore has a number of listed buildings from its industrial past. There is a campaign to make the remaining historical buildings in the Lower Swansea valley, including Landore, a World Heritage Site.

Grade II listed buildings include:

- Pier to former Waste Tip Tramroad & adjoining boundary wall, Hafod Copper Works off Neath Road
- Copper Slag Abutment to former Waste Tip Tramroad, Hafod Copper Works off Neath Road
- Hafod Lime Kiln, off Neath Road
- Canteen Building, at former Yorkshire Imperial Metal Works on Neath Road
- Morfa Bridge, off Normandy Road
- Morfa Quay, off Normandy Road
- Laboratory Building at entrance of former Yorkshire Imperial Metal Works on Neath Road
- Vivian Works Engine House at former Yorkshire Imperial Metal Works on Neath Road
- Chimney west of Vivian Works Engine House at former Yorkshire Imperial Metal Works on Neath Road
- Casey's Roofing Centre, formerly Landore Cinema on Neath Road
- Old Siloh Chapel (English) & Sunday School on Siloh Road
- Museum Stores, formerly Morfa Copperworks
- Former Hafod Copper Works, River Quay
- Former Vivian Locomotive Shed
- Boundary Wall at former Hafod Copper Works

Grade II* listed buildings:

- Mushgrove Engine House & adjacent Chimney Stack, at former Yorkshire Imperial Metal Works, Neath Road
- New Siloh Congregational Chapel & School House on Siloh Road

== See also ==
- George Prowse, Victoria Cross recipient from Landore
- Lower Swansea valley
