= Swansea Barrage =

Dam in the United Kingdom

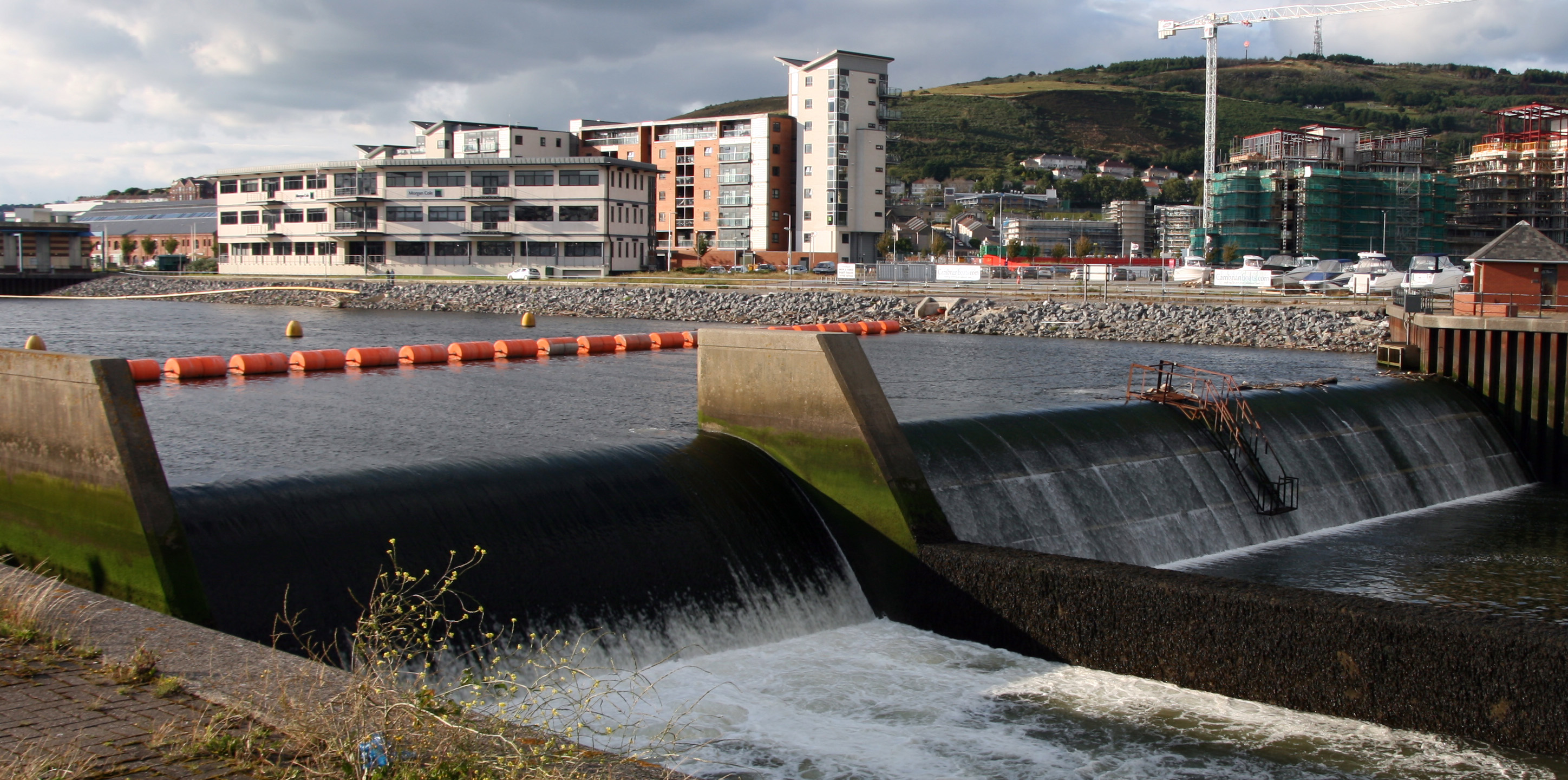
- The barrage in 2007

- Location of the barrage in Wales
- Interactive map of Swansea Barrage
- Country: United Kingdom
- Location: Swansea, Wales
- Coordinates: 51°36′58″N 3°55′44″W
- Status: Operational
- Opening date: 1992

Dam and spillways
- Type of dam: Barrage
- Impounds: River Tawe

Reservoir
- Creates: Swansea Bay

Power Station
- Type: Pumped-storage
- Installed capacity: 200 kW (270 hp)

The Swansea Barrage (or the Tawe Barrage) is a tidal barrage near the mouth of the River Tawe in Swansea, Wales, in the United Kingdom. It was completed in 1992, creating a marina which extended the leisure boat facilities already being offered by the former South Dock.

== Overview ==
The barrage structure includes a boat lock, spillway, fish pass and generator turbine. The turbine serves a dual use: acting as a power generator for the National Grid as well as being used to pump water back into the Tawe River system. The barrage has an installed generating capacity of 200 kilowatts (270 hp).

The barrage scheme gave rise to a number of environmental concerns. Fish navigation up the river and dissolved oxygen levels were problems that arose after completion. Salt water that came in at high spring tides sank to the bottom and stayed there as it is denser than fresh water, reducing oxygen levels for fish. The Environmental Advice Centre was commissioned to undertake an aeration scheme trial in the Tawe in the summer of 1998. The system was based on a diffuser design and propeller mixer, which proved highly effective at exporting the salt water from the deep area of the trial site and raising dissolved oxygen concentrations at the bed.

Following the success of the trial system, a more extensive system was designed for installation in 1999–2000. The installation was conducted using a diving team to ensure optimal location of the diffusers within the river channel. The installation was expected to treat all the problem areas over a 4-kilometre (2.5 mi) long reach of river and ameliorate the poor water quality present in these areas. Monitoring results from the system installed to date have indicated that aeration has effectively raised the oxygen concentration and assisted in the export of saline water from the system. Other fears that arose with the building of the barrage such as the raising of the water table causing ground subsidence problems in the low-lying areas around the River Tawe did not materialize.

== Similar projects ==
Following the success of the River Tawe aeration scheme, the city of Cardiff used the same method to improve the quality of the water in its newly created bay.

== See also ==
- List of reservoirs and dams in Wales
- List of tidal barrages
- List of tidal power stations
- List of power stations in Wales
