= River Tawe =

River in South Wales

Coordinates: 51°37′N 3°56′W

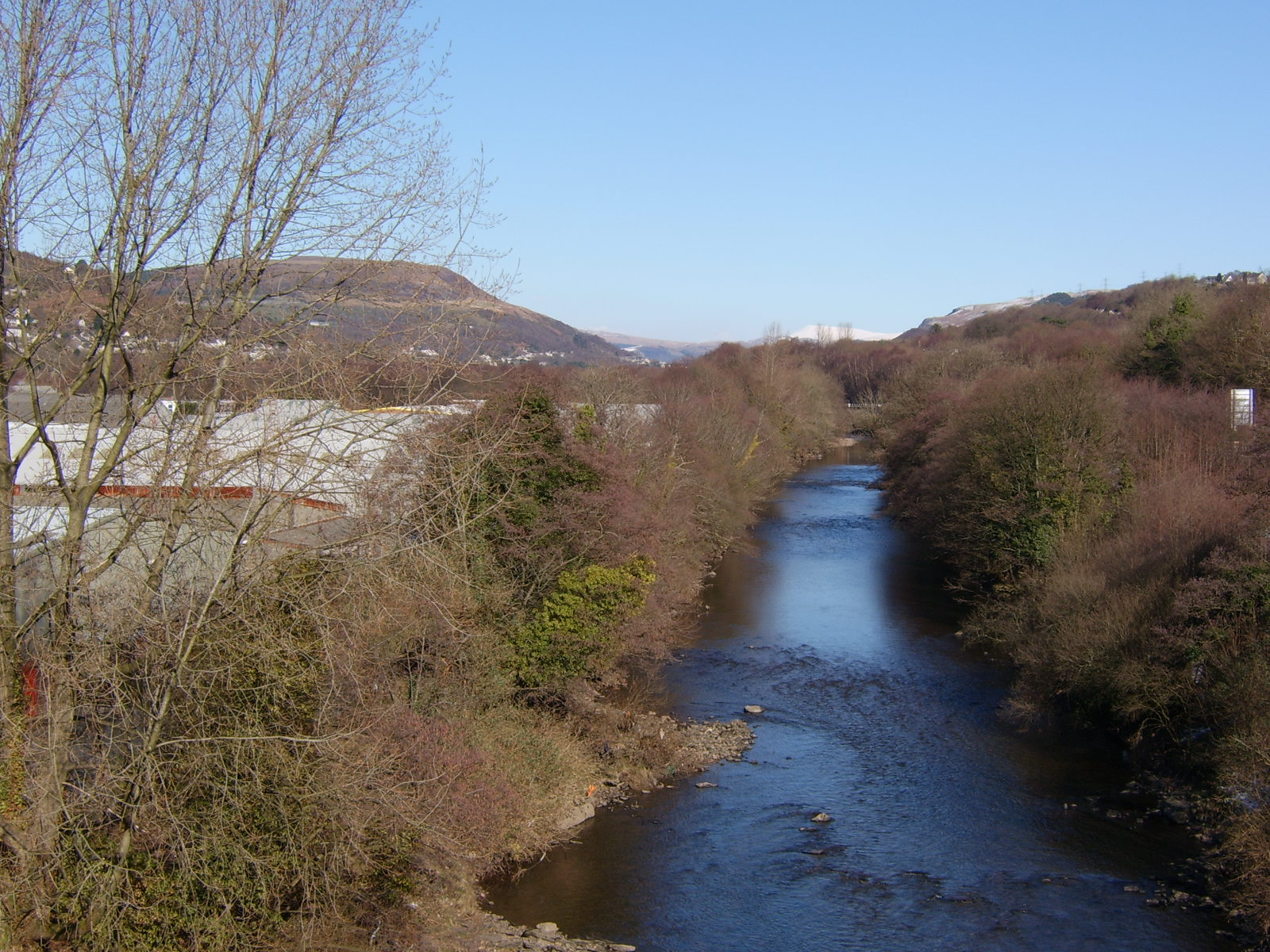
Looking upstream in Pontardawe

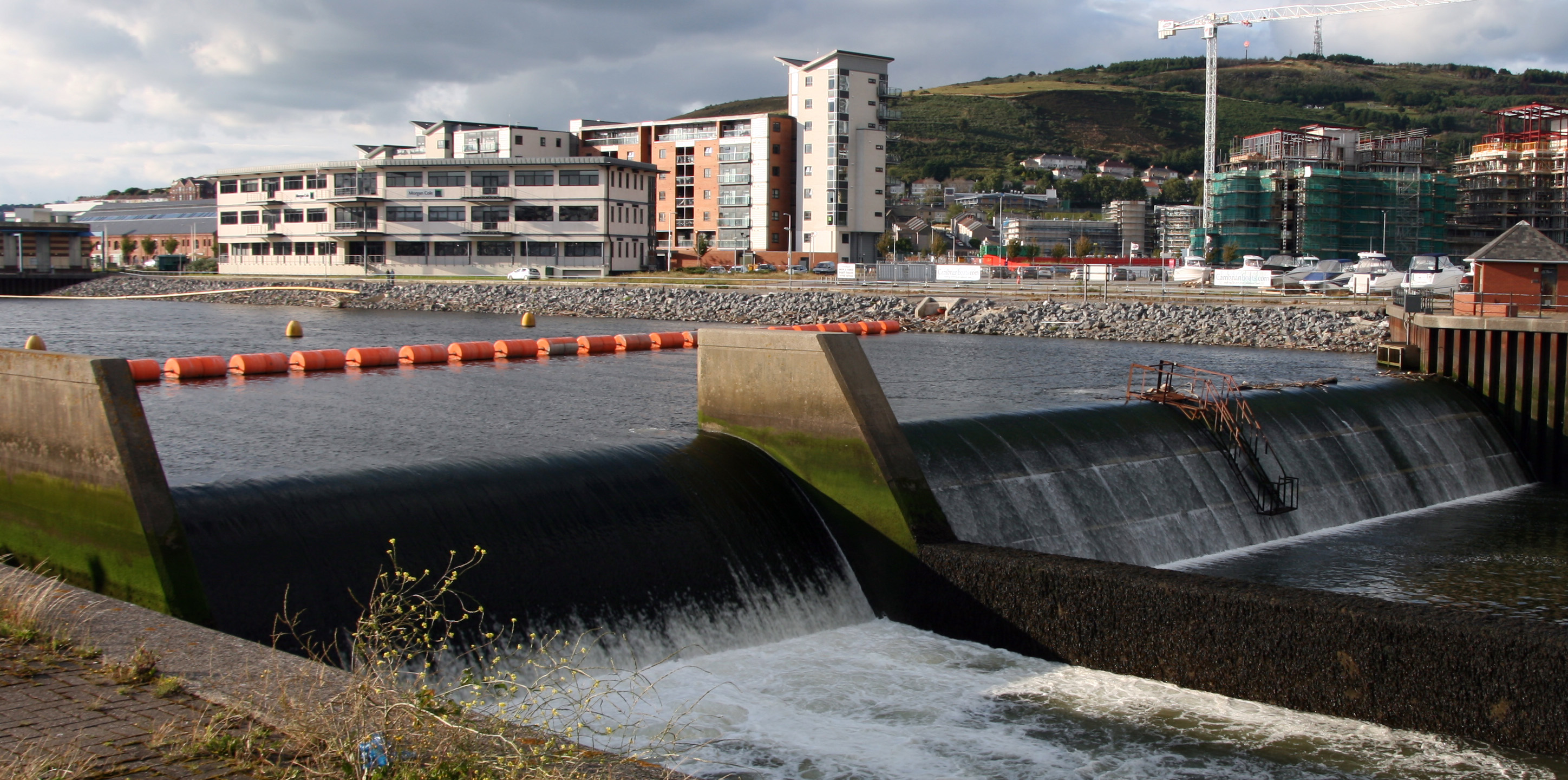
Swansea Bay barrage

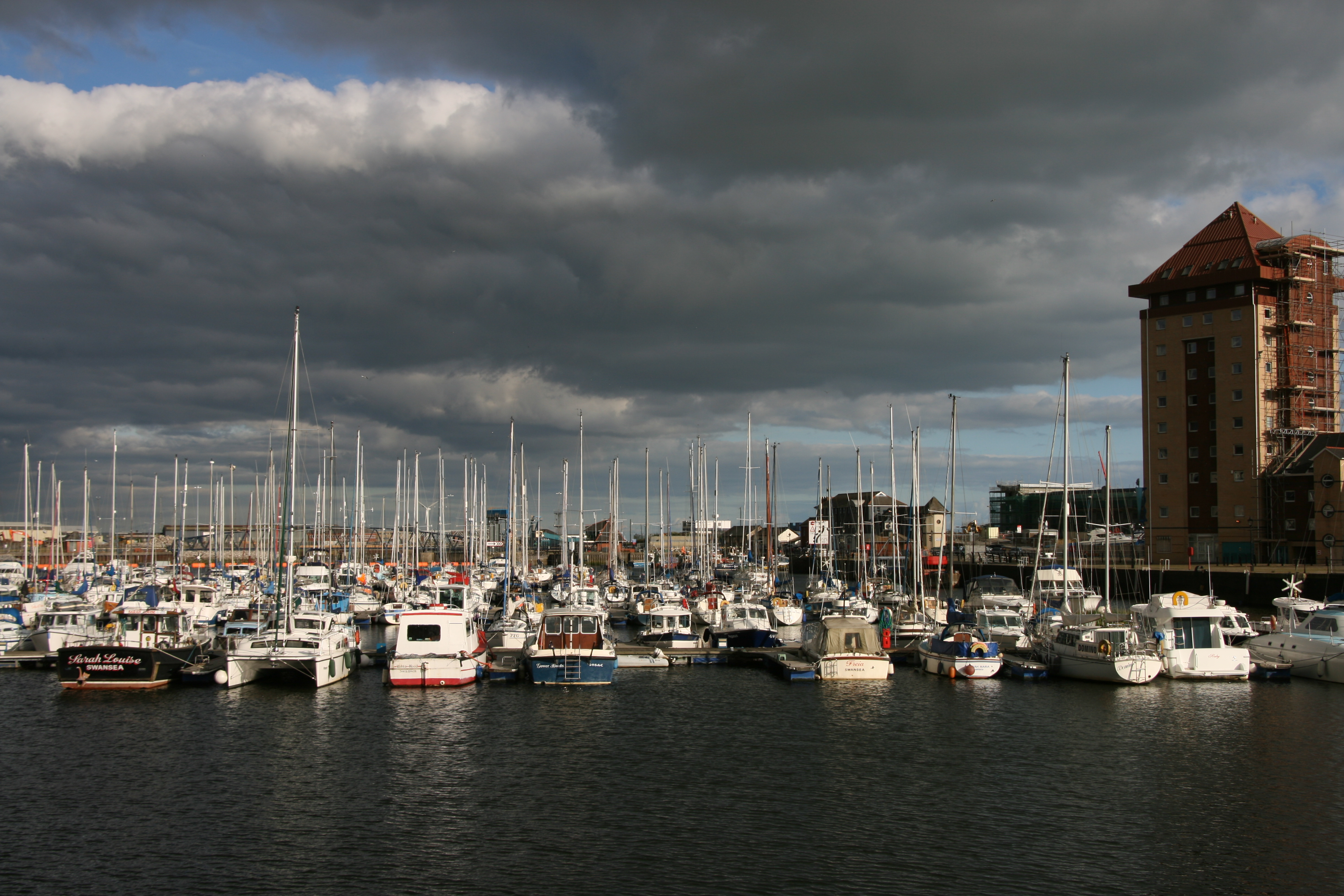
Marina at the River Tawe estuary

A short film on the industrial history and water management of the Tawe catchment area by Natural Resources Wales

The River Tawe (/ˈtaʊi/; Welsh: Afon Tawe [ˈtau.ɛ]) is a 30-mile (48 km) long river in South Wales. Its headwaters flow initially east from its source below Llyn y Fan Fawr south of Moel Feity in the Black Mountain, the westernmost range of the Brecon Beacons National Park, before the river turns south and then southwest to its estuary at Swansea. Its main tributaries are the right bank Upper and Lower Clydach Rivers and the Afon Twrch, with Nant-y-fendrod joining on the left bank. The total area of the catchment is some 246 km^{2} (95 sq mi). The Tawe passes through a number of towns and villages including Ystradgynlais, Ystalyfera, Pontardawe, and Clydach and meets the sea at Swansea Bay below Swansea. The Tawe Valley (Cwm Tawe in Welsh) is more commonly known as the Swansea Valley.

Ownership of the riverbed was granted to the Duke of Beaufort in the 17th century by Charles II resulting in exclusive mineral and fishing rights, which is extended as far as requiring permission and payment for bridges which are built over it. This was last exercised in 2008 when Swansea Council was required to pay £281,431 to the estate, as revealed by a Freedom of Information request.

== History ==
Thomas Morgan states that the name means "the silent river", deriving from the elements "taw" (which he defines as meaning "silent" or "still") and "gwy" (a well attested suffix in Welsh hydronomy denoting a river or waterway).

The lower part of the valley was intensely industrialised in the 18th and 19th centuries and was especially impacted by metal refining and working and to a much lesser extent by [pottery] manufacture. Large areas of the lower valley remain contaminated by industrial spoil containing copper, lead, nickel and zinc. The only significant extant relic of those times is a major nickel refinery at Clydach which is part of the Canadian company Vale Inco. The quality of the river has now greatly improved. Large salmon swim up the river to spawn, whilst trout are in abundance.

In 1992, a barrage was built at the mouth of the river.

National Cycle Route 43 follows this river for much of its course.

== Bridges and crossings ==
Bridges over the River Tawe within the City and County of Swansea, from north to south:

- A4067 (Ffordd Cwm Tawe) road bridge
- B4291 road bridge at Glais
- A4067 road bridge (second crossing)
- former rail access to the Vale Inco works at Clydach
- disused railway bridge (former GWR route from Felin Fran to Clydach)
- A4067 road bridge (third crossing)
- Park Road bridge at Ynystawe
- M4 motorway bridge
- railway bridge (Swansea District Line)
- Swansea Vale road bridge
- A48 Morriston road bridge – links Morriston town centre to the Swansea Enterprise Park
- Beaufort Bridge – historic access point from Beaufort Road to what is now the Enterprise Park area
- Mannesmann pedestrian and cycle bridge – links the Enterprise Park to Beaufort Road in Plasmarl
- southern Beaufort Road bridge (unnamed)
- Landore railway viaduct (South Wales Main Line)
- Morfa footbridge – links the Morfa Retail Park to the Liberty Stadium
- White Rock Bridge – road and pedestrian bridge linking the Landore district with the Bon-y-maen district
- Parc Tawe Bridge – road and pedestrian bridge linking Parc Tawe with St Thomas
- Quay Parade Bridge – road and pedestrian bridge linking Quay Parade with Fabian Way
- Old Swansea Bridge – a former railway bridge: the bridge deck no longer exists but the piers remain
- Sail Bridge – a pedestrian and cycle bridge linking the Maritime Quarter near Sainsbury's superstore to the SA1 Swansea Waterfront development area
- Trafalgar Bridge – a pedestrian and cycle bridge located near the Swansea barrage: built at a cost of £1.2 million, it crosses the barrage lock and part of the bridge swings with the lock gates

== Future developments ==
There are plans for further housing developments on both east and west banks of the River Tawe and a proposal to operate river taxis along the river. A report was commissioned by Natural Resources Wales in 2015 as part of its 'Tawe Trial' initiative – completed by regeneration consultants Trilein Ltd, it recommended a number of initiatives to better connect the urban areas on the west of the river with the more rural areas of Kilvey Hill and Crymlyn Bog beyond to the east.

== See also ==
- Lower Swansea valley
- Swansea Barrage
- Swansea University Rowing Club, who train on the river.

== Bibliography ==
- Reynolds, Ben; Gibson, Gordon (May 2015). "Swansea Eastside Connections" (PDF). Natural Resources Wales.
