= Loughor railway station =

Former railway station in Wales

Loughor

General information
- Location: Loughor, Swansea; Wales
- Coordinates: 51.6615°N 4.0776°W
- Platforms: 2

Other information
- Status: Disused

History
- Original company: South Wales Railway
- Pre-grouping: Great Western Railway

Key dates
- 11 October 1852: Opened
- 4 April 1960: Closed
Location

Loughor railway station was on the South Wales Railway, now the West Wales Line, from Swansea to Llanelli. The station was located on the west side of Swansea in the residential area of Loughor.

== History ==
The railway line between Landore High Level and Carmarthen was opened on 11 October 1852 by the broad gauge South Wales Railway, which later became part of the Great Western Railway. The engineer of this line was Brunel. Originally, Loughor was the first station westwards from Landore; Cockett and Gowerton were opened at later dates.

The station was double track, with 2 platforms. A mineral line to Broad Oak Colliery diverged from the line to the east of the station.

== Loughor Viaduct ==
Brunel's viaduct as at 2007

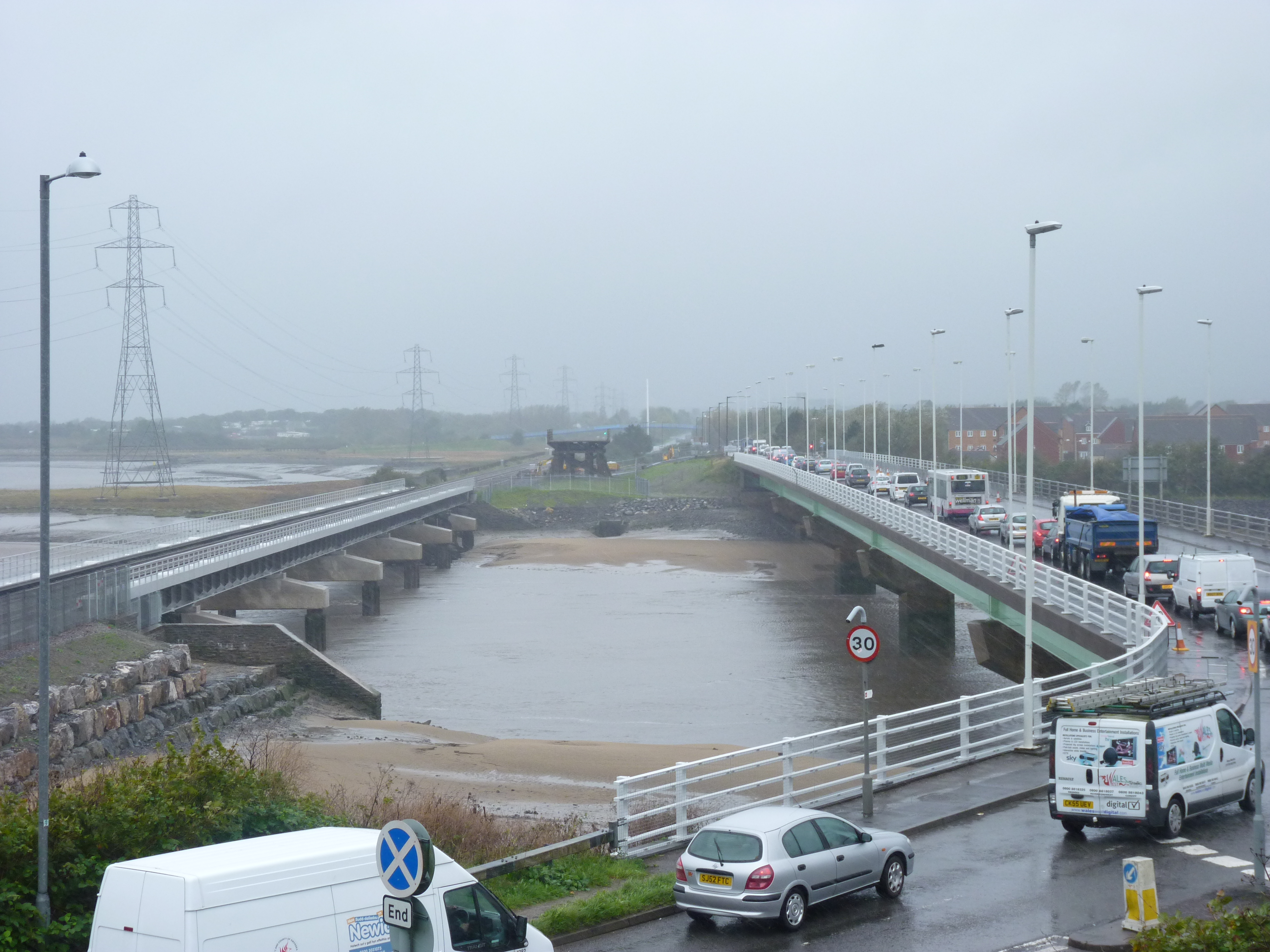
The new bridges, as at 2013

The Loughor Viaduct to the west of the station carries the line across the River Loughor. Before it was replaced in early 2013, the viaduct was the last remaining timber viaduct designed by Isambard Kingdom Brunel.

The Loughor viaduct was constructed to carry the broad gauge South Wales Railway west of Swansea to Carmarthen. It was opened to traffic (broad gauge and standard gauge) in 1852. The viaduct was rebuilt several times; modifications made include the removal of its swing bridge and broad gauge tracks, replacement of the timber deck with an iron structure, and additional piles. In 1986, due to structural concerns, the track was singled and speed restrictions were imposed adding to journey times.

In the early 2010s, Network Rail commissioned a new-build replacement. On 8 April 2013, the new bridge with its redoubled track was opened to traffic. A section of the original viaduct is preserved alongside the new structure.

== 1904 railway accident ==
On 3 October 1904 an express passenger train of 2 engines and 8 coaches from New Milford towards Landore derailed. At Llanelli a tank engine was attached to the front to assist in the climb to Cockett. It is surmised that the train was travelling up to 60 mph to make up time, and jumped the straight track to the west of the Loughor River. There were 5 fatalities, including the driver and fireman of the tank engine, and 94 injured. A full report from the Board of Trade enquiry is available.
