= Llangennech railway station =

Railway station in Carmarthenshire, Wales

Llangennech
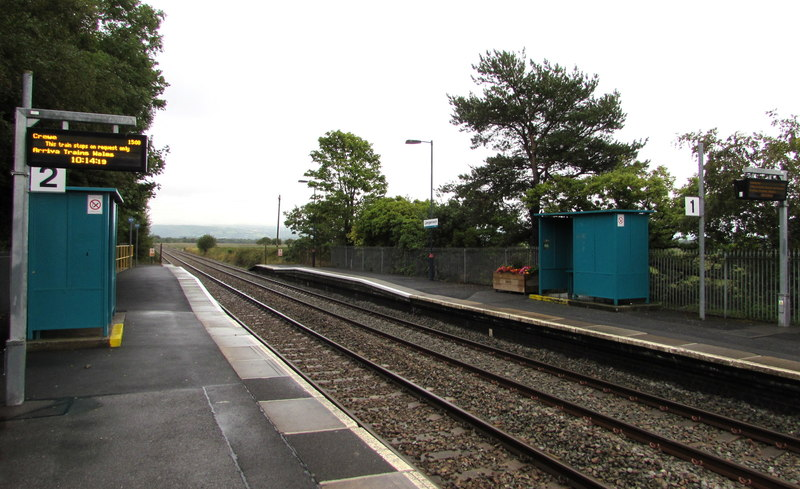
- Platforms at the station

General information
- Location: Llangennech, Carmarthenshire; Wales
- Coordinates: 51.691°N 4.079°W
- Grid reference: SN563012
- Operator: Transport for Wales
- Platforms: 2
- Tracks: 2
- Train operators: Transport for Wales

Construction
- Cycle facilities: 4 Sheffield stands

Other information
- Status: Unstaffed
- Station code: LLH
- Classification: DfT category F2
- Website: nationalrail.co.uk/stations/llangennech/

History
- Opened: c. 1840
- Pre-grouping: Llanelly Railway and Dock Company
- Post-grouping: Great Western Railway

Key dates
- 2020: Freight train derailment

Passengers
- 2021/22: ▲924
- 2022/23: ▲1,868
- 2023/24: ▲2,760
- 2024/25: ▲4,322
- 2025/26: ▼3,876
Location
Notes
- Passenger statistics from the Office of Rail and Road

Llangennech railway station is a railway station in the village of Llangennech. It lies on the Heart of Wales line with services operated by Transport for Wales running to and from Swansea and Shrewsbury.

Llangennech station is located at street level about half a mile away from the centre of the village. It is one of two stations (neighbouring Bynea being the other) located on the double track portion of the route that is shared with the Swansea District Line.

== History ==
Discussions to build a railway in Llangennech began as early as 1830. The station opened c. 1840. It initially served the local collieries by offering a route to the Llanelli Dock for export.

== Facilities ==
The station is unstaffed and has no permanent buildings other than basic shelters on each platform. Passengers wishing to travel must buy tickets on the train or in advance. Amenities are limited to the standard CIS display, customer help point and payphone (the latter two at the main entrance). The platforms are linked by a barrow crossing, which is not recommended for use by disabled travellers without assistance.

In 2016, The Welsh Government funded the installation of reinforced glass fibre 'humps' on the platforms to improve access for wheelchair and pushchair users onto and off trains.

== Services ==
All trains serving the station are operated by Transport for Wales. There are five trains a day in each direction through to Swansea and Shrewsbury) from Monday to Saturday, plus a further Monday to Friday a.m peak service to Llandovery and back to Swansea; two services each way call on Sundays. This is a request stop, whereby passengers have to give a hand signal to the approaching train driver to board or notify the guard when they board that they wish to alight from the train there.

Preceding station	National Rail	Following station
Bynea	Transport for Wales; Heart of Wales Line	Pontarddulais

Freight services operated by DB Cargo to the Trostre Steelworks in Llanelli from Margam pass Llangennech.

The proposal of the West Wales Parkway station in Felindre, Swansea has led to discussions regarding the opening of the Swansea District line for passenger services. Llangennech station sits on the line, and the possibility of direct services to and from Cardiff Central have been discussed for the future.

== Accidents and incidents ==
- On 26 August 2020, a freight train carrying fuel derailed and caught fire near Llangennech. This led to the service being suspended for several weeks whlist the derailed tankers were recovered and the track repaired.
