= Bynea railway station =

Railway station in Carmarthenshire, Wales

Bynea Welsh: Bynie

General information
- Location: Bynea, Llanelli, Carmarthenshire; Wales
- Coordinates: 51.672°N 4.099°W
- Grid reference: SS549991
- Manager: Transport for Wales
- Platforms: 2

Other information
- Station code: BYE
- Classification: DfT category F2

History
- Opened: 1840

Passengers
- 2021/22: ▲820
- 2022/23: ▲1,266
- 2023/24: ▲1,990
- 2024/25: ▲2,716
- 2025/26: ▲4,762
Location
Notes
- Passenger statistics from the Office of Rail and Road

Bynea railway station (Welsh: Bynie) serves the village of Bynea near Llanelli, Carmarthenshire, Wales. Bynea station is situated close to the Millennium Coastal Park and is a convenient stop for cyclists and hikers to the coastal area. It is also the last stop on the Heart of Wales route (on the double track section shared with the Swansea District Line) before it joins the West Wales Line at Llandeilo Junction, to the east of Llanelli.

All trains serving the station are operated by Transport for Wales.

== Facilities ==
The station is unstaffed and has no permanent buildings (apart from waiting shelters), like neighbouring Llangennech. CIS displays, a customer help point and timetable poster boards provide running information. No step-free access is available to either platform.

== Services ==
There are four trains a day in each direction (towards Swansea and Shrewsbury) from Monday to Saturday, plus an extra a.m. peak service to Llandovery and back to Swansea on weekdays only; there are also two services each way on Sundays. The first train northbound starts at Carmarthen rather than Swansea on weekdays. This is a request stop, whereby passengers have to give a hand signal to the approaching train driver to board or notify the guard when they board that they wish to alight from the train there.

Freight services operated by DB Cargo to the Trostre Steelworks in Llanelli from Margam pass Bynea, along with oil trains from refineries in the Milford Haven area.

Preceding station	National Rail	Following station
Llanelli	Transport for Wales; Heart of Wales Line	Llangennech
