= Cockett railway station =

Former railway station in Wales

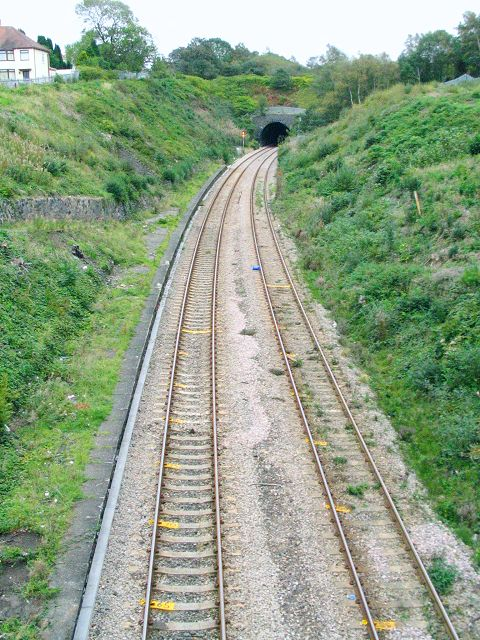
Cockett railway station up platform on left, looking east to Cockett Tunnel and Swansea

Cockett railway station was a former station on the West Wales Line from Swansea to Gowerton and onwards to Llanelli.

The station was located on the west side of Swansea in the residential area of Cockett.

== History ==
The railway line between Landore and Carmarthen was opened on 11 October 1852 by the broad gauge South Wales Railway, which later became part of the Great Western Railway. The engineer of this line was Isambard Kingdom Brunel. Originally the first station westwards from Landore was at Loughor; Cockett and Gowerton stations were opened at later dates. Cockett station was closed to passenger traffic on and from 2 November 1964.

There have been recent proposals to reopen the station as part of the Welsh Government's Rail infrastructure investment.

== Cockett Tunnel ==
Just east of the station, towards Swansea, was the 829 yard Cockett Tunnel. The tunnel was cut through unstable soft ground and had wide cuttings at a shallow angle at either end.

The tunnel suffered a partial collapse in 1899, which was held to have been caused by the resumption of pumping operations at the long-closed Weig-fawr colliery, owned by Philip Richard (II), the flooded workings of which extended beneath the tunnel. The tunnel was completely closed for four weeks, after which traffic was resumed on a single line, but it was not fully restored until 1903, by which time steel ribs had been inserted into the bore of the tunnel at its eastern end (not the location of the collapse) to strengthen the roof. These were found to unduly restrict the loading gauge within the tunnel and were removed in 1908. At the same time the eastern end of the tunnel was opened out (reducing the length to 789 yards) and the cutting sides were supported by two brick-built flying arches preceded by a very short tunnel (51.6336°N 3.9671°W). The banks of the cutting were so unstable that even during this opening-out work, timber horseshoe shoring was required.

== Potential re-opening ==
In October 2021, the Welsh Government in partnership with Capita published their Welsh Transport Appraisal Guidance (WelTAG) Stage 2 report and executive summary. Option 13, on page 4 of the executive summary, recommends the re-opening of Cockett Station as part of the Swansea Bay and West Wales Metro.
