= West Wales Parkway railway station =

Proposed railway station in Wales

Coordinates: 51°40′41″N 3°57′53″W

West Wales Parkway Parcffordd Gorllewin Cymru

General information
- Other names: Swansea North (Welsh: Gogledd Abertawe), Parc Felindre
- Location: near Llangyfelach and Felindre, Swansea; Wales
- System: Proposed railway station
- Owner: Transport for Wales
- Manager: Transport for Wales Rail
- Line: Swansea District Line (currently freight only)
- Platforms: 2
- Train operators: Transport for Wales Rail

Other information
- Status: Proposed

Key dates
- July 2019: Proposal announced
Location

West Wales Parkway (Welsh: Parcffordd Gorllewin Cymru; also proposed as Swansea North; Gogledd Abertawe and Parc Felindre) is a proposed railway station north of Swansea, near to the boundaries of the neighbouring principal area of Carmarthenshire, and the villages of Felindre and Llangyfelach. The station is proposed to be situated at the former Felindre steelworks, near Junction 46 of the M4 and A48, and near Felindre Business Park and Penllergaer Business Park. The project is in the planning stages, as part of a wider Department for Transport proposal to re-open the Swansea District line to passenger traffic.

== Origins ==
Swansea has long been without high speed rail services due to extensive speed limits on the Swansea Loop and Bridgend to Swansea line, set at 40 mph (65 km/h) and 75 mph (120 km/h) respectively.

A number of experts have debated solutions for rail travel in the area, including Professor Mark Barry of Cardiff University. As part of a project commissioned by the Welsh Government, Barry has argued for either a service via the (currently freight-only) Swansea District Line, or the construction of a new line from Baglan to Swansea via the Swansea Bay coast, with a tram-train extension to The Mumbles mirroring the historic tramway which opened in 1807, the first passenger railway in the world.

In July 2019 the then Welsh Secretary Alun Cairns and Transport Secretary Chris Grayling launched the concept of a West Wales Parkway station, to be constructed on the Swansea District Line near Felindre, at a cost of £20m. They proposed the route would allow for "time savings of up to a quarter of an hour from Pembrokeshire to Cardiff" and improvements in connectivity in the Swansea area.

Barry responded to the proposals positively, but insisted that any services would have to bypass Swansea railway station in order to see journey time improvements. This, he argued, meant the Government would still have to invest a significant amount more in building a "broader proposal for the whole of the Swansea bay" in order to prevent negative consequences for Swansea city centre.

=== Grand Union ===
Grand Union plans to operate a new service from 2025 from Carmarthen to London Paddington. A new station that the service will call at is proposed at the West Wales Parkway site with the working name of Parc Felindre.

== Construction ==
Preceding station	National Rail	Following station
	Future services	
Llansamlet	Transport for Wales; Swansea District line	Llangennech

== See also ==
- Transport for Wales
- Transport for Wales Rail
- Proposed railway stations in Wales
