= Grand Union Railway =

Grand Union Railway may refer to these train operators in the United Kingdom:

- Grand Central (train operating company), name under which the company initially proposed to operate its Bradford services under
- Grand Union (train operating company), proposing to operate London to Cardiff services, established in 2019
