= Landore High Level railway station =

Former railway station in Wales

Landore High Level
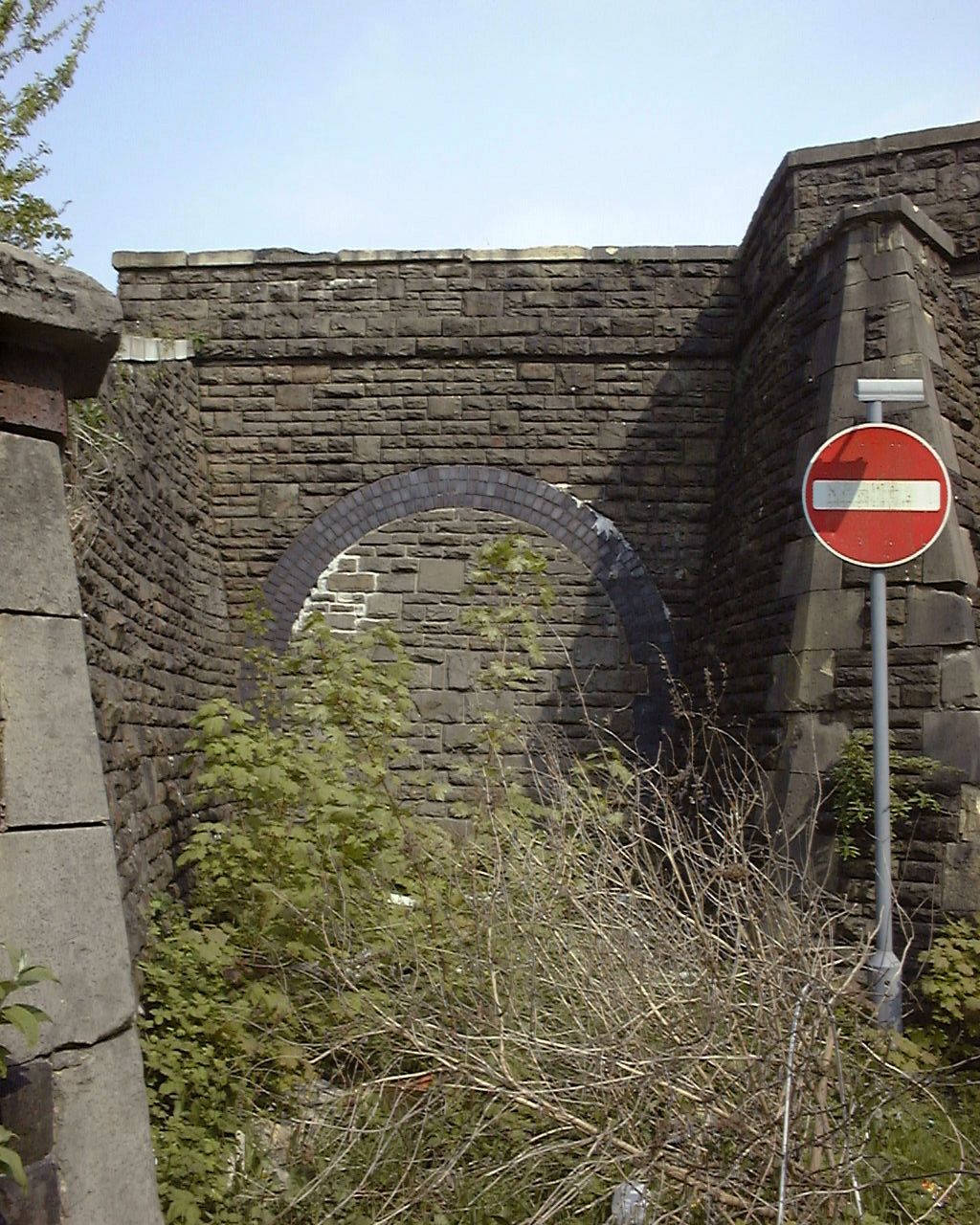
- The former station entrance in 1998

General information
- Location: Landore, Swansea; Wales
- Coordinates: 51.6429°N 3.9387°W
- Platforms: 4 on 2 islands

Other information
- Status: Disused

History
- Original company: South Wales Railway
- Pre-grouping: Great Western Railway

Key dates
- 19 June 1850: Opened
- 2 November 1964: Closed
Location

Landore High Level railway station was opened on 19 June 1850 by the South Wales Railway, which later became part of the Great Western Railway. The station was located on the north side of Swansea in the residential area of Landore. The engineer of this broad gauge line was Brunel. The line was later extended westwards to Carmarthen. After closure of Landore Low Level in 1954 the station became known as Landore.

To the west of the station site is Landore Junction (Swansea Loop East Junction), which allows trains to run south into the main Swansea terminus. The line remains in use as the West Wales Line, between Neath and Swansea.

== History ==
The station suffered a fire in 1874, which resulted in a rebuild in the following year.

== Future ==
As of 2019 the station is being considered for reopening.

== See also ==
- The Landore railway viaduct is a prominent local landmark which was opened with the line and station in 1850.
- Great Western Railway's Landore Depot was used for servicing Inter City 125 passenger trains until its closure in December 2018.
- Landore Low Level railway station was nearby, on the Morriston Branch, closed 1954.
