= Steel industry in the United Kingdom =

The steel industry in the United Kingdom is a major sector of the British economy. In 2023, the United Kingdom was the world's 26th largest producer of crude steel and Europe's 8th largest. It produced 5.6 million tonnes of crude steel, equivalent to 0.3% of global output.

== History ==
The steel industry employed 350,000 people when it was nationalised by Prime Minister Harold Wilson in 1967.

In the 2020s, the steel industry faced crisis. Thousands of job losses at Port Talbot Steelworks lead to Plaid Cymru calling for nationalisation. The Steel Industry (Special Measures) Act 2025 was passed to secure British Steel company at Scunthorpe Steelworks.

== Environmental impact ==
The steel industry is a significant contributor to greenhouse gas emissions by the United Kingdom. It is responsible for 2.2% of total greenhouse gas emissions and 13.4% of greenhouse gas emissions from manufacturing. Environmental concerns have been cited as an issue for the industry.
