= Llanelli railway station =

Railway station in Carmarthenshire, Wales

Llanelli

General information
- Location: Llanelli, Carmarthenshire, Wales
- Coordinates: 51.674°N 4.161°W
- Grid reference: SS506994
- Manager: Transport for Wales
- Platforms: 2

Other information
- Station code: LLE
- Classification: DfT category E

Passengers
- 2020/21: ▼76,446
- Interchange: ▼550
- 2021/22: ▲0.243 million
- Interchange: ▲2,838
- 2022/23: ▲0.274 million
- Interchange: ▲3,560
- 2023/24: ▲0.333 million
- Interchange: ▲6,920
- 2024/25: ▲0.393 million
- Interchange: ▲23,059
Location
Notes
- Passenger statistics from the Office of Rail and Road

Llanelli railway station serves the town of Llanelli, in Carmarthenshire, Wales. It is located on the West Wales line and the Heart of Wales line, 225 miles 20 chains (362.5 km) from London Paddington, measured via Stroud. The station and the majority of trains calling here are operated by Transport for Wales.

It lies between two level crossings, known as East and West, which were previously upgraded in the 1970s. In 2015, Network Rail carried out a further upgrade which saw the control of these level crossings pass from the Grade II listed Llanelli West signal box (which worked the two crossings here only since 1973) to Port Talbot Panel signal box using CCTV.

== History ==
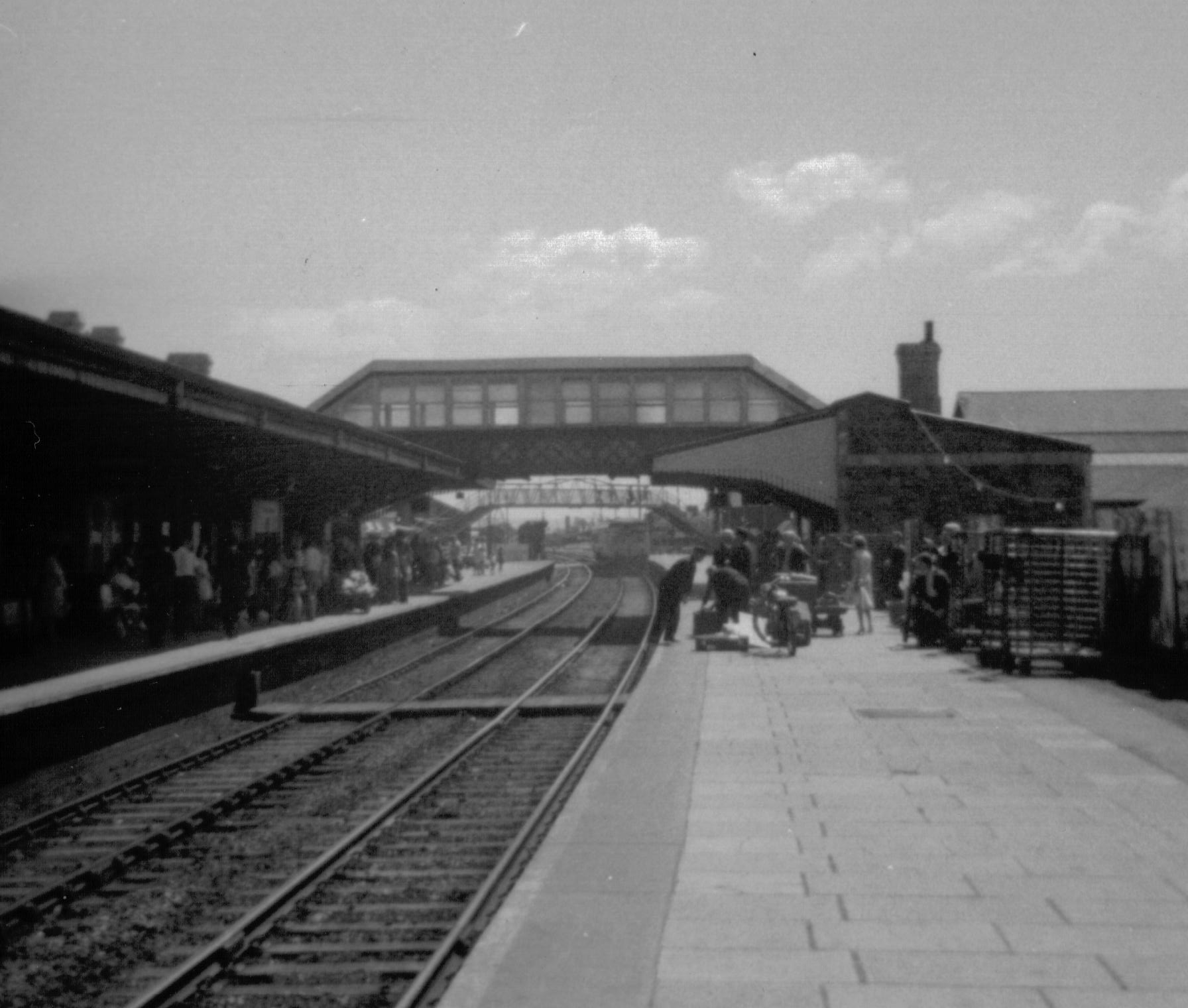
Llanelli in July 1971

Llanelli railway station was the scene for the Llanelli Riots of 1911, which took place on 19 August; their immediate cause was the very first railway strike which lasted only two days. The strike started on Thursday evening and, by Saturday evening, two young men had been shot dead by the military. One man was killed when a railway truck exploded and, on the following day, three more people died from their injuries. The story of the riots is set in a period of great industrial unrest, and involves prominent figures on the international scene such as Lloyd George, Winston Churchill, King George V and Kaiser Wilhelm of Germany.

== Facilities ==
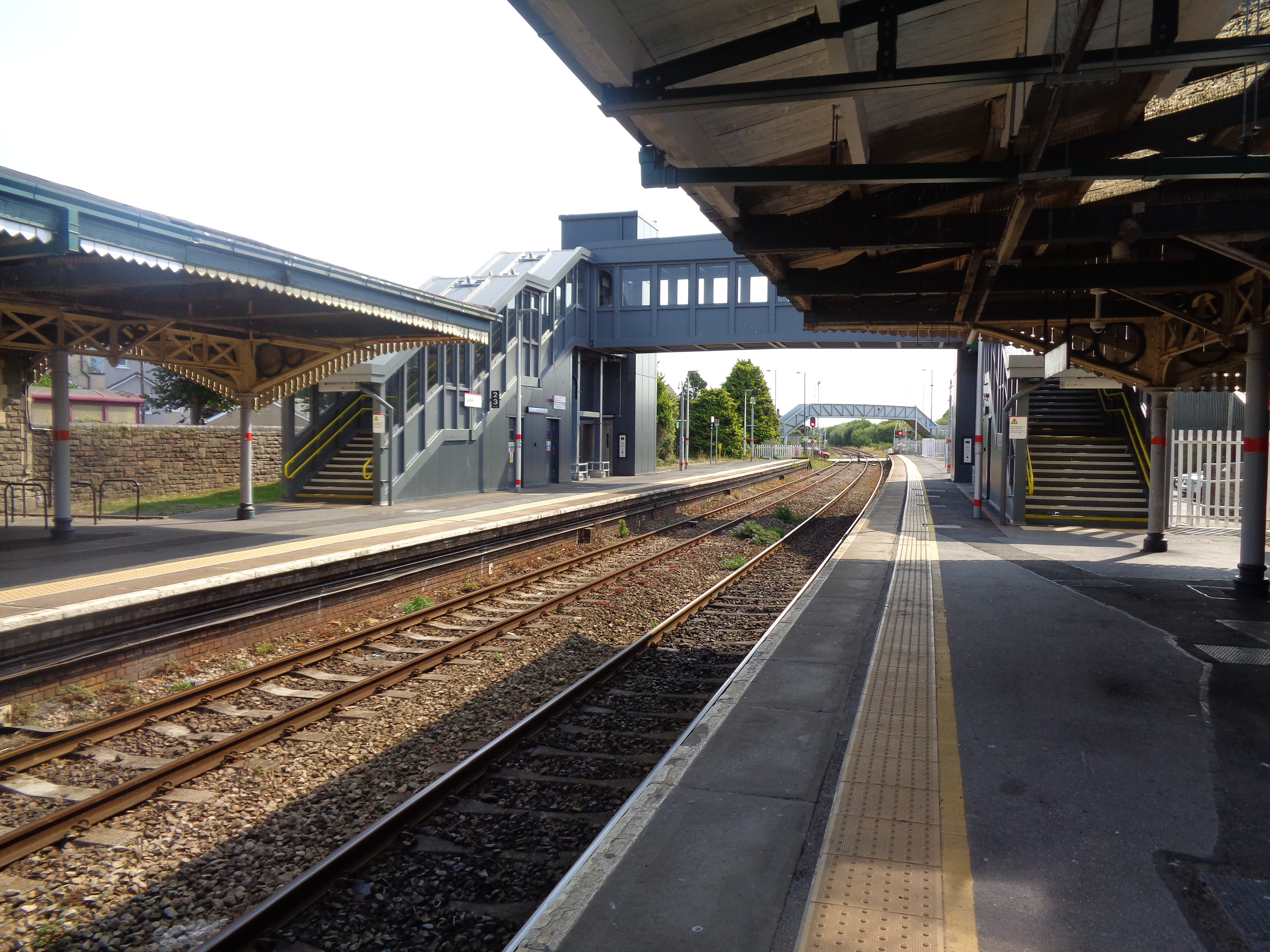
The station's fully accessible footbridge

The station is staffed, with the ticket office on platform 2. A self-service ticket machine is provided for use when the booking office is closed and for collecting advance purchase/pre-paid tickets. The main buildings on this platform also house a newsagents shop, toilets, help point and post box. Platform 1 has canopies, bench seating and a customer help point. Digital CIS displays, timetable posters and automated announcements provide train running information. The platforms are linked by a footbridge with steps, but level access is possible to both platforms using the east level crossing and nearby road.

A fully accessible footbridge was installed in 2024 at a cost of £6.3 million, as part of the Department for Transport's Access for All programme.

== Services ==
Routes into Llanelli are operated by two train operating companies, which provide the following service in trains per hour (tph):

Transport for Wales:

- 1 tp2h to Manchester Piccadilly, via Cardiff Central
- 1 tph to Carmarthen, with some services extending to Milford Haven, Pembroke Dock or Fishguard Harbour; trains to the latter destination are timed to connect with the ferry to/from Rosslare Europort
- 1 tph to Swansea
- 1 tp2h to Shrewsbury, via Cardiff Central.

Great Western Railway:

- 1 tp2h to Carmarthen
- 1 tp2h to London Paddington.

On summer Saturdays, GWR also operates a service between London Paddington and Pembroke Dock.

Preceding station	National Rail	Following station
Gowerton	Transport for Wales; West Wales line	Pembrey & Burry Port
Port Talbot	Transport for Wales; Swansea District line	Pembrey & Burry Port
Gowerton or Swansea	Transport for Wales; Heart of Wales line	Bynea
Swansea	Great Western Railway; London - Carmarthen	Pembrey & Burry Port or Carmarthen
	Future services	
Gowerton	Lumo; London - Carmarthen	Carmarthen

=== Future services ===
In December 2022, the Office of Rail and Road approved for Grand Union Trains to commence a new service from Paddington to Carmarthen, in partnership with Spanish rail operator Renfe, for which a fleet of new bi-mode trains will be used. The new service is scheduled to commence in December 2024. The service will call at Bristol Parkway, Severn Tunnel Junction, Newport, Cardiff Central, Gowerton and Llanelli en-route to Carmarthen.

In December 2024, following FirstGroup's acquisition of Grand Union, it was announced the proposed Paddington to Carmarthen service would be operated by Lumo.

=== Rail and sea corridor to Ireland ===
Transport for Wales' boat trains to and from Fishguard Harbour serve the station. These connect with the Stena Line ferry to Rosslare Europort in Ireland, with a daily morning and evening service in both directions. Two other services to and from there also call since the branch service was improved in 2011. This route has been in existence since 1906.
