= Margam TMD =

Coordinates: 51.53891°N 3.7462°W

Margam TMD was a railway locomotive traction maintenance depot situated in Port Talbot, South Wales. The depot code was MG, which has now been re-allocated to Margam Knuckle Yard service point.

Built to replace the existing Margam Depot and for the co-development of the new Margam Knuckle Yard in 1960, it was a 2-road shed with full servicing facilities. Having been a major repair depot for EWS's class 60 and 66 locomotives due to its facilities, the depot serviced all of EWS's fleet of locomotives in South Wales, after the closure of Cardiff Canton TMD.

In September 2008, the service moved to Margam Knuckle Yard. All servicing above a C-class, and all brake inspections, are now sent to Toton TMD. Formerly, there were many stored locomotives on the former site, including class 08, 09, 37, 47, 56 and 60. From 2013, there was a significant amount of stored rolling stock on site, including VGA, BYA, MEA, HTA, BAA & WIA wagons. As of June 2024, most wagons stored on site have been removed. Some wagons were cut up on site.
