= Steel Company of Wales =

Welsh steel and tinplate producer

The Steel Company of Wales Ltd was a Welsh steel and tinplate producer. It was formed in 1947 and absorbed into British Steel Corporation in 1967, British Steel then merged with Hoogovens and became Corus UK Limited. The business now forms part of Tata Steel Europe.

The company led the restructuring of the steel and tinplate industries around Swansea and Llanelli, building the Abbey Steelworks at Margam, planning a new deep water harbour at Port Talbot, and new tinplate works at Trostre and Velindre. Trostre came into production in 1951 and Velindre in 1956.

The Steel Company of Wales was nationalised in 1951, becoming part of the Iron and Steel Corporation of Great Britain, was denationalised shortly afterwards, becoming the Steel Company of Wales again, and renationalised in 1967.

== Sources ==
- Whitaker's Almanack (various dates)
