= Port Talbot Steelworks =

Steel production plant in Port Talbot, Wales

Coordinates: 51.56613°N 3.76831°W

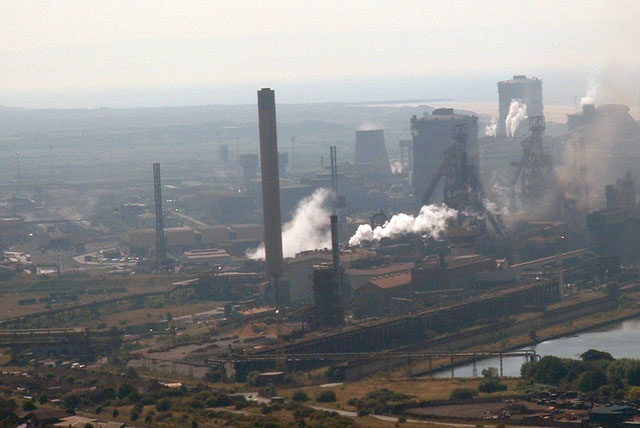
- Industry: Steelmaking
- Employees: around 2,000
- Owner: Tata Steel

Port Talbot Steelworks is a steel mill in Port Talbot, Wales. It is the largest steelworks in the United Kingdom and one of the largest in the world. Over 4,000 people worked at the plant until the last blast furnace closed in October 2024. Around 2,000 employees remain after this time, processing imported steel slabs to produce rolled steel products. The mill is in the process of building a 320-ton capacity electric arc furnace which would be operational in late 2027.

The majority of the steel slabs produced before September 2024 were rolled on-site at Port Talbot and at the Newport Llanwern site to make a variety of steel strip products. The remainder was processed at other Tata Steel plants or sold in slab form. After September 2024 imported steel slabs are used as inputs at those rolling plants.

The works covers a large area of land which dominates the east of the town. Its two inactive blast furnaces and steel production plant buildings are major landmarks visible from both the M4 motorway and the South Wales Main Line when passing through the town.

== History ==
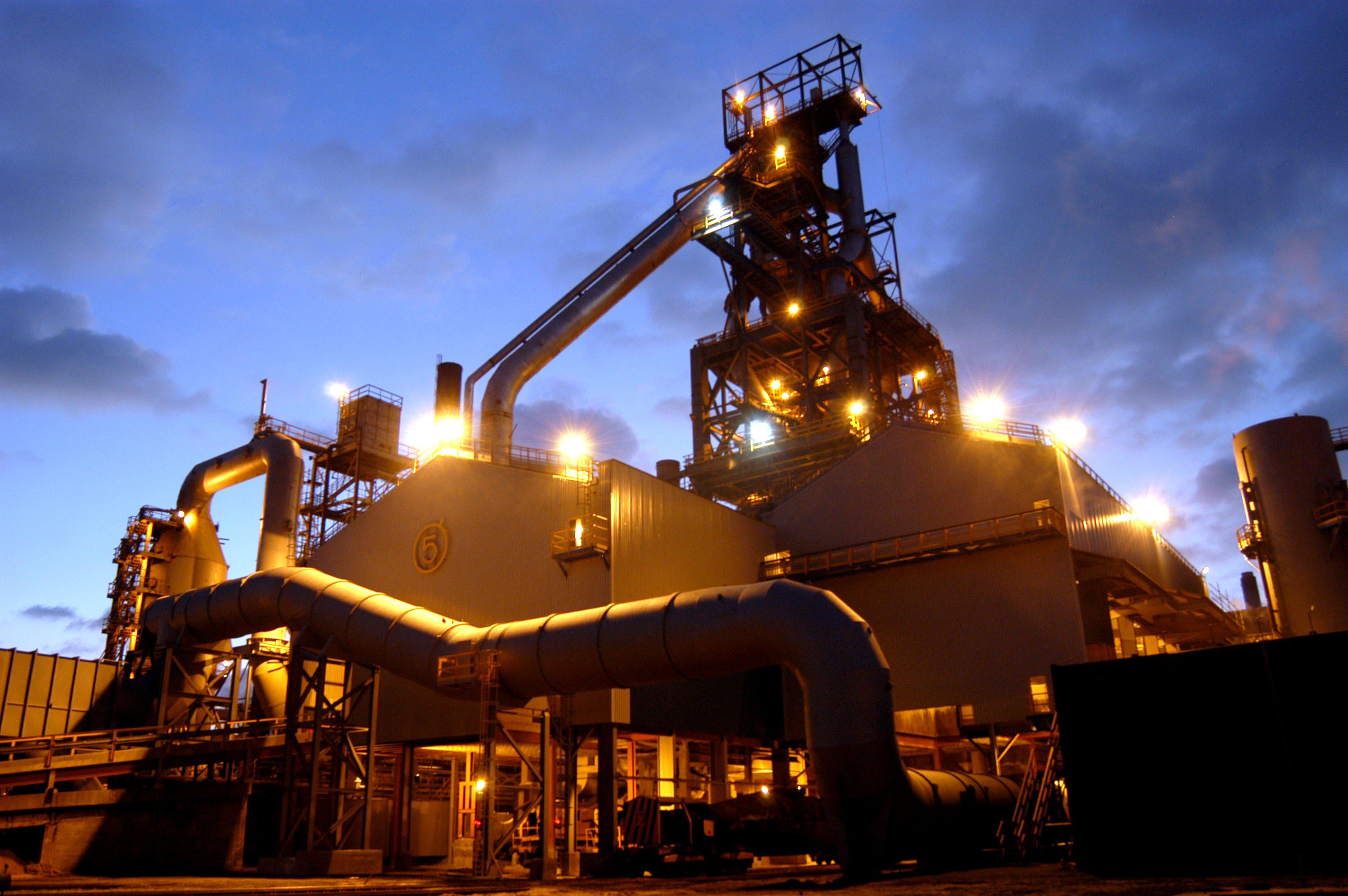
Blast Furnace #5

The site at Margam is made up of a number of plants across a large site, developed since 1901.

=== Port Talbot works ===
The original works were built by Gilbertson, and situated south of Port Talbot railway station. Constructed in 1901–1905, the works was named after Christopher Rice Mansel Talbot of Margam Castle, the principal sponsor of the developments at Port of Port Talbot, which had opened in 1837.

The site was closed in 1961 and demolished in 1963. The General Offices housed Port Talbot magistrates' court until 2012, but the rest of the site is an industrial estate.

=== Margam works ===
Steelmaking at the Port Talbot complex began with the Margam Iron and Steel Works, completed between 1923 and 1926.

=== Abbey works ===
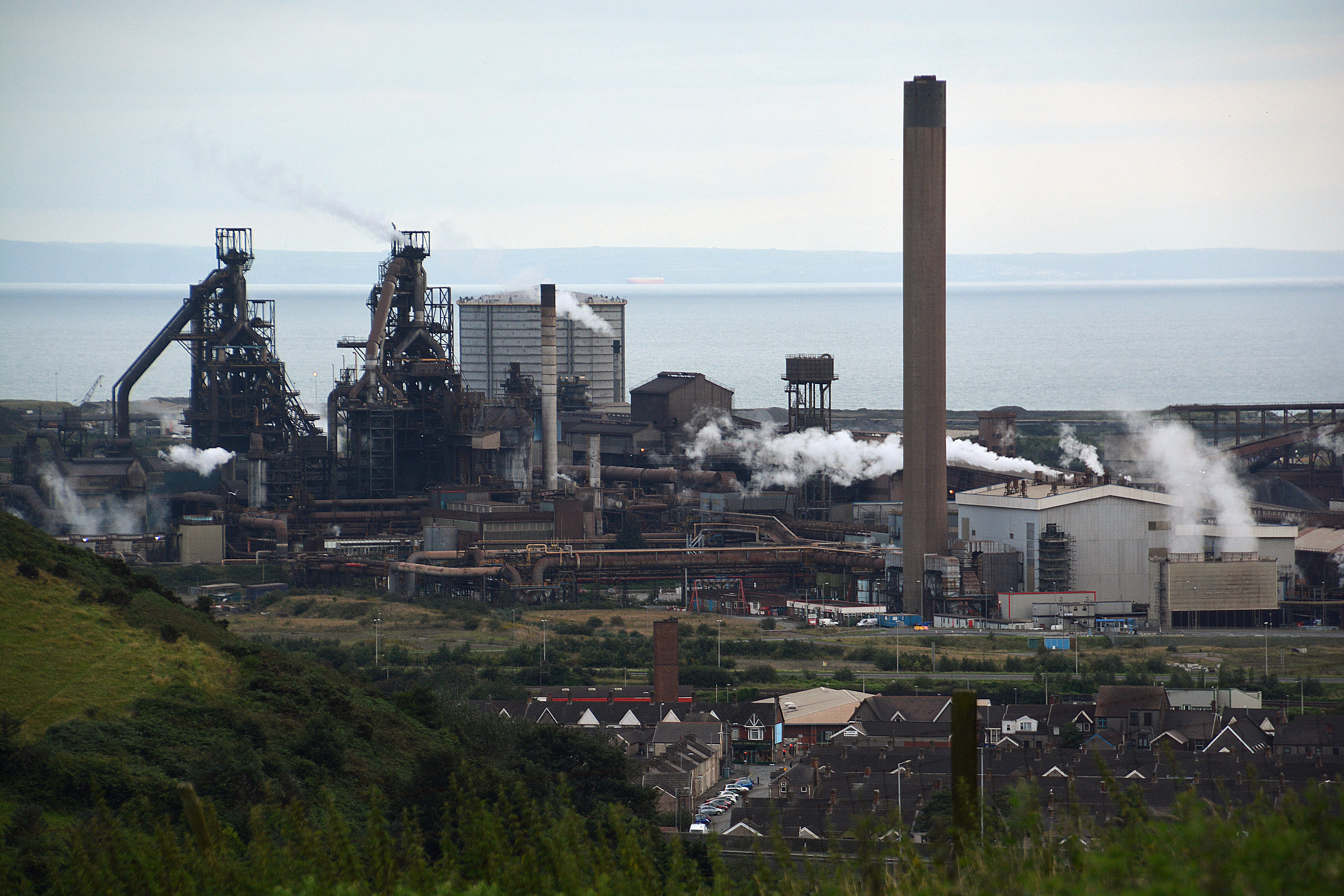
Ironworks at Port Talbot

Abbey Steelworks was planned in 1947, but today is correctly termed Tata Steel Strip Products UK Port Talbot Works. It is believed to be named after the Cistercian Margam Abbey that used to be on the site – a small amount of the original building still stands (protected) within the site that survived the dissolution of the monasteries. Several steel manufacturers in South Wales pooled their resources to form the Steel Company of Wales, to construct a modern integrated steelworks on a site then owned by Guest, Keen and Baldwins. However, political manoeuvring led to tinplate production being retained in its original heartland further west, at two new works in Trostre and Felindre. The steelworks were built upon 32,000 piles into sand and peat. Opened in 1951, it was fully operational by 1953.

Once the new No. 4 and 5 furnaces began production, the older furnaces, numbers 1 and 2, built in the 1920s, were demolished. No. 3 furnace, built in 1941, was retained and used as a stand-by, until demolished in the mid-2000s. At the time of peak employment in the 1960s, the Abbey Works was Europe's largest steelworks and the largest single employer in Wales, with a labour force of 18,000.

In 1967, the Steel Company of Wales was nationalised and absorbed into British Steel Corporation, which was subsequently privatised and merged with Hoogovens to form Corus Group. Tata Group agreed to purchase all Corus' ordinary shares in March 2007, and the deal was concluded in April 2007. In 2010 it was announced that Corus was to be rebranded to the group name of Tata Steel Europe.

== 21st century ==
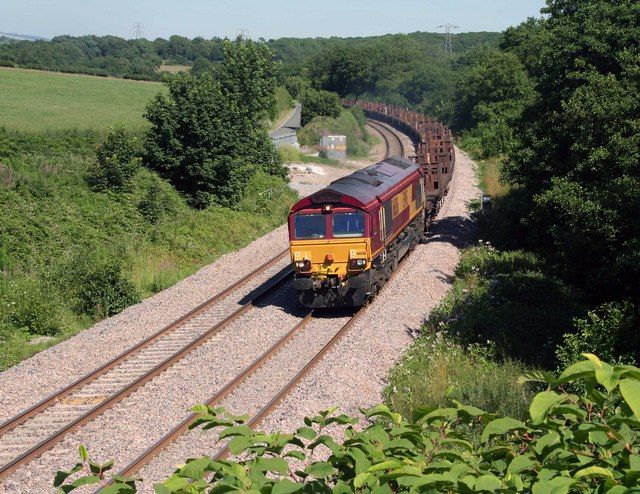
EWS Class 66 heads towards Margam Knuckle Yard with a load of steel empties.

It is an integrated steelmaking site using imported ore and coal; together with Llanwern steelworks, the plants produce up to 3.5 million tonnes of hot rolled and cold rolled annealed steel coils per annum, for a variety of different end uses. Output is taken by rail from Margam Knuckle Yard to Shotton for coating, Trostre for tinplating, or direct to the Midlands for the motor industry and domestic goods.

=== Financial challenges ===
Tata Steel announced on 30 March 2016 it may pull out of its UK operations, including Port Talbot. It provided as reasons "imports of Chinese steel, high energy costs and weak demand". "Plans to save the steelworks were put on hold when potential buyers indicated their intention to withdraw from the bidding process due to the UK voting in favour of withdrawing from the EU". However, in spite of the Brexit result and warnings from industry and elsewhere that leaving the EU could have a disruptive effect on UK steel, following the vote Tata recommitted to the plant. The UK Government said it "remains committed to supporting a sustainable, long-term future for steel making in the UK".

=== Closure of blast furnaces ===
In September 2023 the UK Government agreed to pay Tata a £500 million subsidy in order for it to invest in an electric arc furnace. This was in a bid to cut emissions resulting from the carbon-intensity of the current blast furnaces. Trade unions worried that the increased autonomy of the electric arc furnace would lead to job losses. Unions presented the firm with a plan to keep one of the two blast furnaces open until 2032 in order to minimise job losses. The firm rejected the plan, announcing in January 2024 that they would close both blast furnaces, putting 3,000 jobs at risk.

With Tata being the largest private employer in Port Talbot, concerns have been raised regarding the future economic health of the town.

There has been controversy among some commentators around the causes behind Tata choosing to close the blast furnaces in 2024 as opposed to accepting the proposal from unions to keep them open as the plant transitioned to more environmentally friendly methods of production. Many commentators have blamed Net Zero targets. However, Labour former Welsh First Minister Carwyn Jones pointed to the UK's decision to leave the EU as a factor, stating that the uncertainty caused by Brexit resulted in reluctance to invest in the plant and had made it less competitive and less viable as a business, highlighting that Tata was retaining blast furnace operations in the Netherlands and choosing to close them in the UK. Figures from the steel industry had for some time been warning that leaving the EU would have a negative impact on UK steel, and Stephen Kinnock, Port Talbot's MP, had also warned prior to the referendum that the UK choosing to leave the EU would be "a disaster" for the UK's steel industry. The negative impact from Brexit as a result of uncertainty and lower EU customer orders was cited as one of the reasons behind the liquidation of British Steel, previously owned by Tata, prior to the UK even leaving the EU. Following the UK's departure from the EU and the implementation of the EU–UK Trade and Cooperation Agreement, UK steel exports to the EU dropped significantly and high-profile industry figures spoke out about the impact the TCA, which imposed some tariffs and quotas on UK steel exports, was having on UK steel. British Steel had also made a submission to the UK Parliament highlighting the importance of the EU market, which according to their figures accounted for 70% of UK steel exports, urging them to revise the TCA. Tata themselves also acknowledged that Brexit had increased their operating costs, estimating that it had added around 15% to the cost of transport and processing.

Tata Steel also received criticism for stating environmental reasons were behind their decision to close the blast furnaces at Port Talbot due to their construction of new blast furnaces in India.

=== Fatal accidents ===
There have been many fatalities caused by industrial accidents at the plant since its opening, the number having been reduced over the years by improved safety measures.

An explosion at the Port Talbot plant in November 2001 killed three men. Len Radford, 53, Stephen Galsworthy, 25, and Andrew Hutin, 20, died when blast furnace five erupted, sending molten liquid down on them. Twelve other men were seriously injured in the blast. The blast heavily damaged No.5, which was rebuilt and resumed operation from 2003 onwards.

In July 2012 Tata Steel were fined £500,000 over the 2006 death of worker Kevin Downey at the Port Talbot plant. Engulfed in steam during a night shift, Downey wandered into a channel of molten slag heated to 1,500 °C (2,730 °F). He was rescued by colleagues, but suffered 85% burns and died later that day. At the time of the accident, the Port Talbot plant was still controlled by Corus Steel UK.

In 2019 a contractor was crushed to death while servicing hot rolling machinery at the Port Talbot plant. Tata Steel pleaded guilty to criminal charges of failing to ensure health and safety, and was ordered to pay fines and costs in excess of £1.5 million.

== See also ==
- Scunthorpe Steelworks
