= Port of Port Talbot =

Port in Wales

Coordinates: 51°35′12″N 3°47′10″W

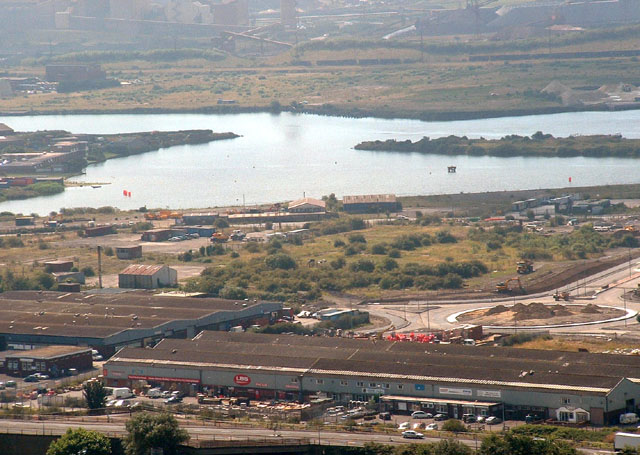
Port Talbot Docks, looking south over the docks and industrial area

The Port of Port Talbot is located on the River Afan estuary next to Port Talbot Steelworks in the industrial town of Port Talbot, South Wales. The whole basin complex covers about 500 acres (2.0 km^{2}), consisting of: an inner set of floating docks, developed from 1834 onwards; and an outer tidal basin, completed in 1970. Owned and operated by Associated British Ports, the tidal basin has the deepest berthing facilities in the Severn estuary and is one of only a few harbours in the UK capable of handling Capesize vessels of up to 170,000 tonnes deadweight (DWT), mostly for the import of iron ore and coal for use by nearby Port Talbot Steelworks.

== History ==
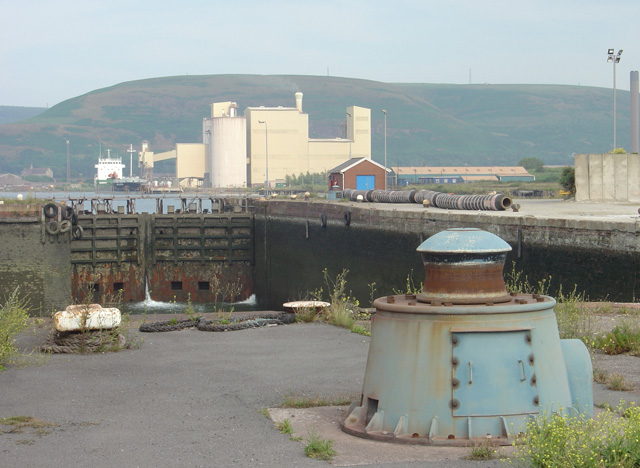
Port Talbot Dock entrance lock

Aberafan had developed as a natural harbour from the 17th century at the mouth of the River Afan, acting as a point of transport for coal and sheep to South Wales, Bristol, and the West Country. From 1750 onwards, tramlines connected the harbour to local coal mines, and the establishment of copper smelting and ironworks towards the end of the 18th century quickly developed volumes of trade.

Aberavon Port and Harbour Act 1834
- Act of Parliament
- Parliament of the United Kingdom
- Long title: An Act for improving the Port and Harbour of Aberavon in the County of Glamorgan.
- Citation: 4 & 5 Will. 4. c. xliii

Dates
- Royal assent: 16 June 1834

Aberavon Port and Harbour Act 1836
- Act of Parliament
- Parliament of the United Kingdom
- Long title: An Act to alter and amend an Act of His present Majesty, for improving the Port and Harbour of Aberavon in the County of Glamorgan, to further improve the said Harbour, and to change its Name.
- Citation: 6 & 7 Will. 4. c. xcviii

Dates
- Royal assent: 4 July 1836

Text of statute as originally enacted

Port Talbot Company Act 1840
- Act of Parliament
- Parliament of the United Kingdom
- Long title: An Act to enable the Port Talbot Company to raise further Monies, and to amend the Acts relating to the same Port.
- Citation: 3 & 4 Vict. c. lxxi

Dates
- Royal assent: 19 June 1840

Text of statute as originally enacted

Port Talbot Company's Act 1865
- Act of Parliament
- Parliament of the United Kingdom
- Long title: An Act to empower the Port Talbot Company to raise additional Capital; and for other Purposes.
- Citation: 28 & 29 Vict. c. lxxxv

Dates
- Royal assent: 19 June 1865

Text of statute as originally enacted

Local Member of the UK Parliament, Christopher Rice Mansel Talbot of Margam Castle, recognised that improved transportation could stimulate industrial growth. As local MP he introduced a bill in 1834 which when passed as the Aberavon Port and Harbour Act 1834 (4 & 5 Will. 4. c. xliii) approved the set-up of the Aberavon Harbour Company to develop the port facilities. A further act, the Aberavon Port and Harbour Act 1836 (6 & 7 Will. 4. c. xcviii), authorised the diversion of the river into a new channel to enable a new dock to be constructed by the renamed Port Talbot Dock Company in Rice Mansel Talbot's honour. Completed in 1837, it is considered the first major docks in South Wales, ahead even of developments at Cardiff Docks. The lock entrance was enlarged in 1874.

In 1894, the Port Talbot Railway and Docks Company was formed to directly link the port to the various competitive railways, particularly the South Wales Mineral Railway and the Rhondda and Swansea Bay Railway; and the coal mines and ironworks in the surrounding Llynfi and Garw valley areas, via the Duffryn Llynvi and Porthcawl Railway. This facilitated a further extension to the dock facilities in 1898.

The founding of Port Talbot Steelworks in 1902, and Margam Steelworks in 1916, was brought about by the need for iron and steel producers to now import both ore and fuel, enabling an upscaling in volumes of production and hence economies. Resultantly, iron ore imports through Port Talbot reached 300,000 tons per annum by 1930, and 3,000,000 tons per annum by 1960.

The PTR&DCo was absorbed by the Great Western Railway on 1 January 1922. Nationalised in 1948 by the Labour government of Clement Attlee, ownership of the docks passed to the British Transport Commission, under its Docks and Inland Waterways Executive. The Transport Act 1962 (10 & 11 Eliz. 2. c. 46) abolished the commission and distributed its assets to five successor bodies, with the nationalised British Transport Docks Board inheriting the dock undertakings, other than harbours used primarily by railway steamer services, including Port Talbot. The BTDB was among the first nationalised industries to be privatised by the Conservative government of Margaret Thatcher.

== Port Talbot Tidal Harbour ==
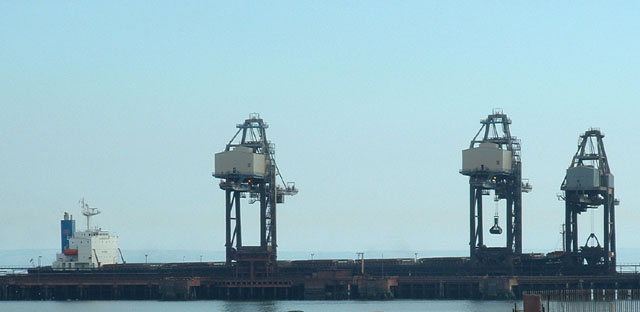
The iron ore jetty of the Port Talbot Tidal Harbour

However, further increases in the volume of goods handling were restricted by the docks inability to handle the new bulk carriers, with the old docks unable to accept a ship of greater than 10,000 tonnes deadweight (DWT).

In 1966, work commenced on the construction of the new Port Talbot Tidal Harbour, south-west of the existing docks system. Completed in 1970, it was the first dry-bulk cargo terminal in the UK capable of accepting ships in excess of 100,000 tonnes deadweight (DWT). Its completion enabled the complete closure of the old docks complex, the Beeching Axe and the UK miners' strike (1984–1985) having negated the need for coal export. Further dredging in 1996 deepened the harbour by 2.6 metres, increasing the maximum size of vessel that can be accommodated today to 180,000 tonnes deadweight (DWT).

== Present ==
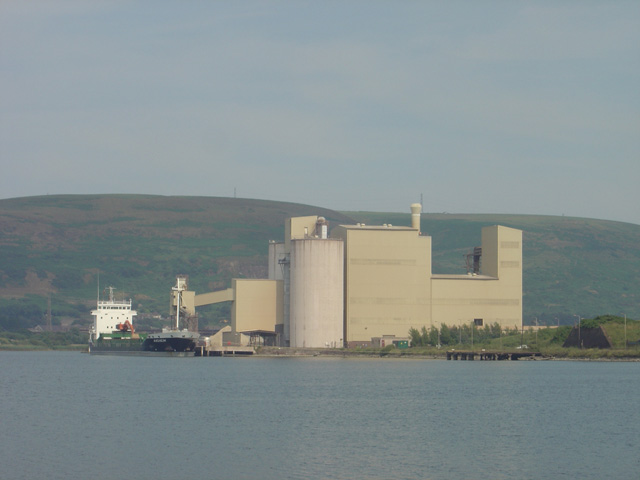
The stone processing plant

In 1998, after being closed to shipping since 1959, the old floating docks were re-opened to handle coastwise cargoes of ground and granulated blast-furnace slag for Civil & Marine's new cement works at Rio Tinto Wharf. Since handling steel products in March 2007, other cargoes handled have included: timber, sand, stone, and heavy lifts. Today they are capable of handling ships of up to 8,000 tonnes deadweight (DWT). Connecting rail transport is handled via DB Schenker Rail (UK)'s Margam Knuckle Yard.

The docks are used by Port Talbot steelworks for the export of steel products and the import of raw materials for manufacturing steel, with cargoes of coal, iron ore, sand, cement, and processed and granulated slag. They also have the capacity to handle large volumes of renewable energy fuels, such as wood chips and biomass. In 2007, the port handled 9,502,000 tonnes of cargo.

The northern area of the docks is designated as the Port Talbot Industrial Estate. The development of the Port Talbot Peripheral Distributor Road includes roundabouts which provide direct access to this development area and a potential development area adjacent to the docks. The new link will pass through the south of Port Talbot Steelworks and have links to the under-used wharves in the docks which have development potential. There have been proposals for the development of an intermodal freight terminal at the port.

== Nearest places ==
- Aberavon Beach
- Aberavon
- Taibach
- Port Talbot steelworks
