= Swansea District line =

Section of railway line in Swansea

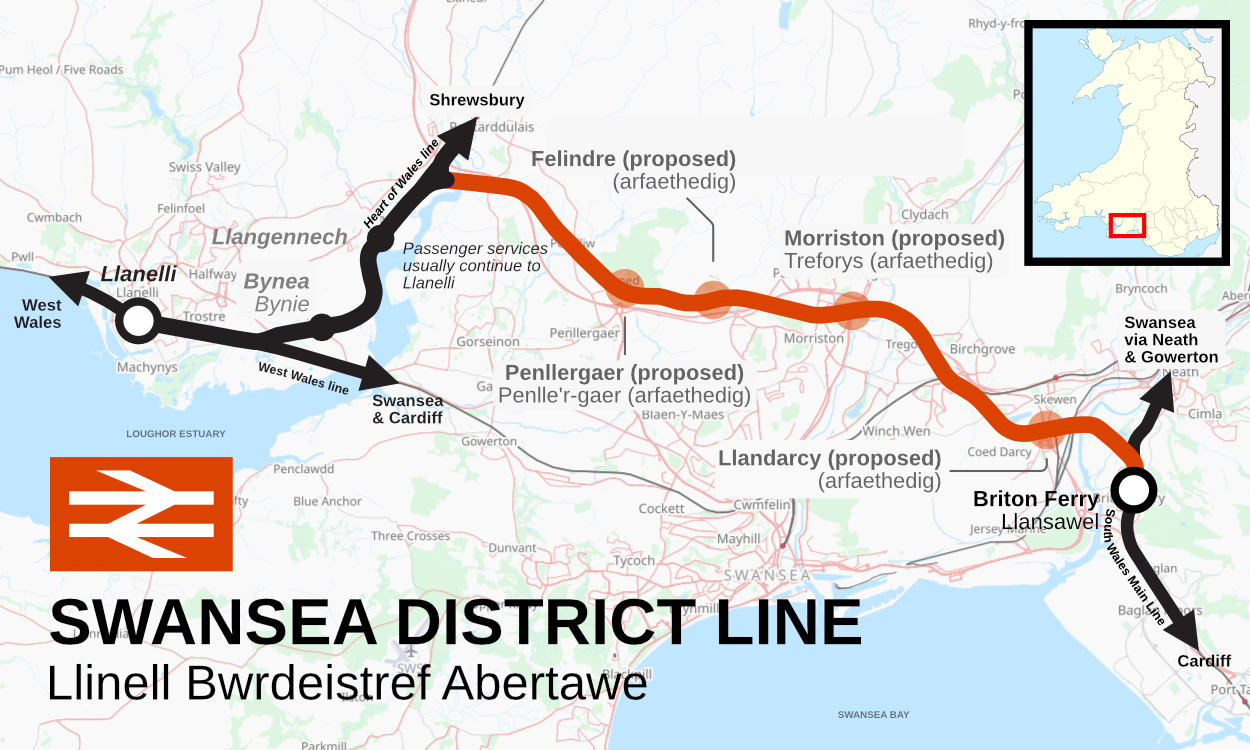
Map of the Swansea District line (orange).

The Swansea District line is a section of railway line running through the northern part of Swansea, Wales and is primarily used for freight transportation, although minimal passenger services also traverse the route. It was built by the Great Western Railway in 1912 to provide a faster and less steeply graded route between London and Fishguard, in connection with the recently opened harbour at the latter place. It can thereby claim to be the last mainline railway to have been built in Wales. The double track line runs from Cwrt Sart junction at Briton Ferry on the South Wales Main Line to Morlais junction near Pontarddulais on the Heart of Wales line.

== Current usage ==
The line is currently used mainly for freight traffic, but Transport for Wales run two or three services along the line in each direction on Mondays to Saturdays, one of which is the daytime boat train between Fishguard Harbour and Cardiff. The boat train service is run in connection with the Stena Line ferry to/from Rosslare in Ireland. By taking the Swansea District line, these passenger services bypass Neath, Swansea and Gowerton railway stations.

== Future plans ==
Network Rail are considering rationalisation of this line following replacement of the Loughor railway viaduct and re-doubling of the track at Gowerton, work which was completed in 2013. This could mean more traffic being diverted via the South Wales Main Line and Gowerton station.

The rail transport campaign group, the Railway Development Society has proposed instead that this link be restored for passenger services including building stations to serve Llandarcy, Morriston and Grovesend.

In 2017, the UK Government commissioned an independent report by the University of South Wales into developing a new parkway station at Felindre.

The Department for Transport announced in July 2019 that it would be proposing the re-opening of the District line to passenger traffic as part of a £20m project which would see a West Wales Parkway station open near to Felindre.

== Loss of gauge ==
Careless maintenance work on the Swansea District line has reduced the rail gauge available on the Swansea District line in the past, reducing its use to freight.
