= Gowerton railway station =

Railway station in Swansea, Wales

Gowerton Welsh: Tre-gŵyr

General information
- Location: Gowerton, Swansea; Wales
- Coordinates: 51.6487°N 4.0353°W
- Grid reference: SS592964
- Manager: Transport for Wales
- Platforms: 2

Other information
- Station code: GWN
- Classification: DfT category F2

History
- Opened: 1 August 1854; 172 years ago

Passengers
- 2020/21: ▼34,648
- 2021/22: ▲0.105 million
- 2022/23: ▲0.119 million
- 2023/24: ▲0.142 million
- 2024/25: ▲0.159 million
Location
Notes
- Passenger statistics from the Office of Rail and Road

Gowerton railway station (originally Gower Road and later Gowerton North) serves the village of Gowerton, Wales. It is located at street level at the end of Station Road in Gowerton, 219 miles 45 chains (353.4 km) from the zero point at London Paddington, measured via Stroud. The station is unstaffed but has a ticket machine, shelters on each platform and live train running information displays.

== Background ==
Gowerton station was opened as Gower Road by the South Wales Railway on Tuesday 1 August 1854. It was later renamed Gowerton, following a request to the railway company by the parish vestry, and from 1950 became known as Gowerton North to distinguish it from the Gowerton South railway station which served the now closed Pontarddulais to Swansea Victoria section of the Heart of Wales Line until 1964.

== History ==
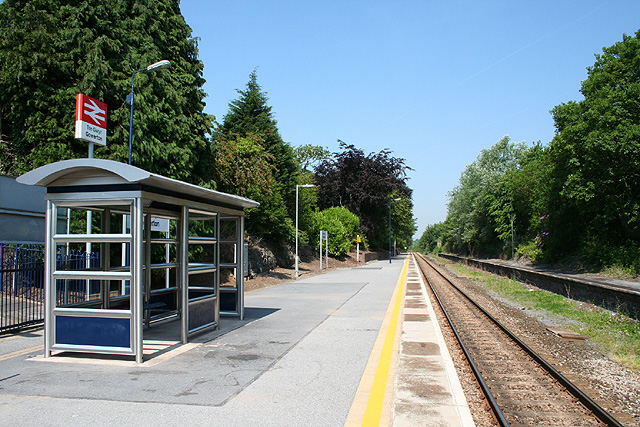
Gowerton station in June 2006

The station originally had two platforms, sited on the section between Cockett station and Duffryn, but the track was singled in 1986 as an economy measure. Network Rail planned to re-double the section of railway through this station and re-instate the disused east-bound platform in May 2012. Work commenced in March 2013 and was completed a month later.

This has increased the capacity of this section of line and allowed more trains to stop at this station. The re-doubling work was completed in July 2013 with the disused platform brought back into use. This resulted in an additional 95 services stopping at Gowerton every week and this has also helped to increase passenger usage at the station, which has risen by 2,100% since 1998.

== Services ==
Gowerton is served approximately every hour by Transport for Wales services heading westbound towards Llanelli, where they continue to either West Wales or to Shrewsbury via the Heart of Wales line; and eastbound towards Swansea, with many continuing further east to Cardiff Central, Hereford and Manchester Piccadilly. The station was originally a request stop, but on 9 September 2013, it was no longer listed as one.

=== Future services ===
In December 2022, the ORR approved Grand Union to commence a new service from Paddington to Carmarthen in partnership with Spanish rail operator Renfe, for which a fleet of new bi-mode trains will be used. The new service is scheduled to commence in December 2024. The service will call at Bristol Parkway, Severn Tunnel Junction, Newport, Cardiff Central, Gowerton and Llanelli en-route to Carmarthen. In December 2024, following FirstGroup's acquisition of Grand Union Trains, it was announced the proposed London Paddington to Carmarthen service would be operated by Lumo.

Preceding station	National Rail	Following station
Swansea	Transport for Wales; West Wales Line	Llanelli
Swansea	Transport for Wales; Heart of Wales line	Llanelli
	Future services	
Cardiff Central	Lumo; London–Carmarthen	Llanelli
