= Landore Low Level railway station =

Disused railway station in Landore, Swansea

Landore Low Level

General information
- Location: Landore, Glamorganshire; Wales
- Coordinates: 51.6437°N 3.9359°W
- Grid reference: SS661956

Other information
- Status: Disused

History
- Original company: Great Western Railway
- Pre-grouping: Great Western Railway
- Post-grouping: Western Region of British Railways

Key dates
- 9 May 1881: Opened
- 4 January 1954: Closed
Location

Landore Low Level railway station served the district of Landore, in the historical county of Glamorganshire, Wales, from 1881 to 1954 on the Morriston Branch.

== History ==
The station was opened on 9 May 1881 by the Great Western Railway. The services were suspended on 9 May 1921 to save coal from the trains due to a coal strike. They resumed on 20 June 1921. The station closed on 4 January 1954.

Preceding station	Disused railways	Following station
Terminus	Great Western Railway; Morriston Branch	Plas Marl; Line and station closed
