= Trostre Steelworks =

Manufacturing facility

Coordinates: 51°40′24.07″N 4°7′45.84″W

Trostre Steelworks is a tinplate manufacturing facility located in Pemberton, Carmarthenshire. Planned by the Steel Company of Wales in 1947, today it is part of Tata Steel Europe's infrastructure.

== Background ==
The name of the area derives from the Pemberton family, landowners and industrialists from the North of England, who played a role in the development of Llanelli (especially the local coal industry) in the early 19th century.

== History ==
On formation in 1947, the nationalised Steel Company of Wales was under UK Government pressure to both increase production and profits, and rationalise its production base. As part of its strategic plan, the company envisaged creating two new tinplate works, one at Trostre and one at Felindre, Swansea.

With in excess of 12,000 men unemployed in post-World War II Llanelli, the decision was made to focus on construction of the Trostre plant to make best use of the area’s developed skills in tinplate manufacture. Chosen due to its close location to railway access via Llandeilo Junction on the West Wales Line/Heart of Wales Line, after buying up three farms, the new plant was planned with an output of 400,000 tons per annum.

Construction was started in August 1947, but due to the marshland-geology of the site, main ground works contractor Robert M Douglas was forced to devise a new type of formwork for its construction. Timber was the traditional material for such purposes, but immediately post-war could only be obtained on permit from the Ministry of Supply. The quantity allocated by the ministry was inadequate to maintain the required progress of the work, so alternative means of providing the necessary formwork were investigated. Limited quantities of cold steel plate were available, and the timber obtained by permit was to a considerable extent used as framing to which the steel plate was fixed. The available quantities were soon absorbed and the supply was augmented by the purchase of now redundant Anderson-type air raid shelters, which were rolled flat and pressed into panels of uniform size. This was the first steel panel formwork system ever deployed in the world.

Production started in 1951, which was also the year in which the delayed Felindre plant was given approval for construction. Output reached the planned 400,000 tons in 1956.

=== British Steel ===
In 1967, the Steel Company of Wales was nationalised with others to form British Steel Corporation. Choosing to close the tinplate works at Port Talbot Steelworks, they invested in all three remaining tinplate works within the newly formed South Wales group: Trostre, Felindre and Ebbw Vale. With four electrolytic continuous tinning lines installed at each plant, they were capable of combining to produce 2 million tons of tinplate per annum.

While Felindre had always out produced Trostre on quality and volume since the start of its production in 1956 (peak production, 450,000 tons per annum), after a review of its tinplate sites in South Wales, British Steel decided in December 1980 to close Felindre. 1,300 people were made redundant in March 1981, though 138 were found jobs at Trostre. Production finally ceased in 1989, when another 108 were given jobs at Trostre.

=== Corus ===
On 6 October 1999, a merger was announced between the Koninklijke Hoogovens steel company of the Netherlands and British Steel to form new company Corus.

Although investment had continued at the Ebbw Vale site over the past two decades, No.2 ETL had been shut down in 1995, and rather than be redeveloped as planned had become a source of spares for the No.1 ETL. Steel production capacity was in excess of the required market in Europe, hence the need for the merger, which would result in the closure of capacity across the newly integrated company. With much tinplate consumption moving to the newly expanding Asian market, it came as little surprise when on 1 February 2001 that Corus announced the focus of tinplate production at Trostre, and the resultant complete closure of the Ebbw Vale site with the loss of 780 jobs.

The Ebbw Vale plant began a shut-down procedure, with many of the lines within the plant packaged up and transported to other Corus sites, including Trostre and IJmuiden, the Netherlands, while other plants were sold as a package to an Indian-based company.

In July 2002, the Ebbw Vale steelworks site officially closed, although a skeleton staff deconstructed the remaining sold plants and handled shipping of residual finished product until December 2002. This led to Trostre becoming the UK's only tinplate manufacturer.

=== Tata Steel ===
In 2021 and 2022, Tata Steel at Trostre celebrated its 70th anniversary. It included the Tin Works art project titled by artist Hilary Powell to showcase the history and people of Trostre printed onto cans made of tinplate.

== Present ==
Presently the plant employs around 700 people, and manufactures tinplated steel, electro chromium coated steel and laminated steel for packaging applications such a food and drinks cans, aerosols and paint tins. The plant takes in hot rolled steel from Port Talbot and IJmuiden, and some cold rolled steel from Llanwern. Most raw materials and output product is transported by DB Cargo UK via the Margam Knuckle Yard. The plant's customers include Heinz, Ball Packaging Europe and Crown Holdings.

Tata Steel's Packaging Recycling team are based at the site, responsible for managing the largest steel reprocessor in the UK. The works was one of the first large manufacturing sites in the UK to attain ISO 14001 accreditation, the European Standard for Environmental Management.
