= Grand Union (train operating company) =

Proposed UK train operator (2019–2024)

Overview
- Franchise: Proposed open-access operator
- Founders: Ian Yeowart
- Successors: First Rail Stirling (Stirling route); Lumo (Carmarthen route)

Other
- Website: www.granduniontrains.co.uk

Grand Union was a proposed open-access operator, that had developed plans to operate train services in the United Kingdom from England to Scotland and Wales.

The operator had two main proposed routes. One being an England–Wales route, between London Paddington, in England, and Carmarthen, in Wales. The other being an England–Scotland route, between London Euston and Stirling.

In December 2022, the company was authorised by the Office of Rail and Road to operate trains between London Paddington and Carmarthen from December 2024. It was later granted the rights to operate the England to Scotland service between London Euston and Stirling, in March 2024.

Grand Union then first sold its rights for the London Euston–Stirling service to FirstGroup in September 2024, de-merging its two proposed operations in summer 2023. However, the remainder of the company, including the England–Wales route, was purchased fully by FirstGroup in December 2024, and the Carmarthen service would be part of Lumo instead.

Grand Union was founded by Ian Yeowart, who founded previous open-access operators Alliance Rail Holdings and Grand Central before selling both to Arriva.

== Former proposed services ==
=== England–Wales ===
Grand Union's first proposal was to operate a two-hourly service between London Paddington and Cardiff Central calling at Reading, Bristol Parkway, Severn Tunnel Junction, Newport and Cardiff Parkway. From 2023, the service would have been increased to hourly and extended to Llanelli calling at: Swansea, with possibly a further extension to Carmarthen. In its April 2019 submission to the Office of Rail and Road (ORR), it proposed operating hourly services between London Paddington and Cardiff Central.

In July 2019, the application was withdrawn and replaced with an amended one. In May 2020, the application was replaced again seeing the introduction of a proposed extended service running to Carmarthen, with the initial two-hourly service starting in December 2021. In February 2021 the application was rejected. In April 2021 an amended application was lodged.

Grand Union proposed to operate with ex-LNER Class 91s and Rail Operations Group Class 93s hauling nine-car Mark 4s and a Driving Van Trailer.

In December 2022, the ORR approved Grand Union's plan for the new rail service from Paddington to Carmarthen, directing Network Rail to enter into a contract with the operator. A fleet of new bi-mode trains will be used. The project is being developed in partnership with European investment company Serena Industrial Partners and Spanish rail operator Renfe. The new service was scheduled to commence in December 2024. The service will call at Bristol Parkway, Severn Tunnel Junction, Newport, Cardiff Central, Gowerton and Llanelli.

In October 2024, it was announced the service would likely start in 2027, due to problems encountered in procuring new rolling stock. Following the purchase by FirstGroup in December 2024, it was announced that the Carmarthen route would be branded under Lumo rather than Grand Union.

=== England–Scotland ===
In August 2019, Grand Union lodged an application to operate four trains each way per day between London Euston and Stirling calling at Milton Keynes Central, Nuneaton, Crewe, Preston, Carlisle, Lockerbie, Motherwell, Whifflet, Greenfaulds and Larbert with InterCity 225s from May 2021. In June 2021, Grand Union lodged an amended application proposing to use LNER Class 91s and Rail Operations Group Class 93s hauling nine-car Mark 4s and a Driving Van Trailer.

In 2023 Grand Union revised its proposal changing its planned rolling stock to Class 22x units, at the same time the start date for this service was changed to June 2025.

On 7 March 2024, the Office of Rail and Road approved Grand Union’s proposed service starting from June 2025.

In September 2024, the London–Stirling operation was sold to First Group, which was renamed First Rail Stirling Ltd. Prior to this, the operation was de-merged from the London Paddington–Carmarthen operation in Summer 2023, with the two proposed services operating separately. However in December 2024, FirstGroup purchased the rest of Grand Union.

=== Other proposals ===
In 2023, Grand Union initiated consultation to operate five daily train services connecting Cardiff Central and Edinburgh Waverley, with a possible start in 2025. This followed CrossCountry's franchise extension in September 2023 to run until 15 October 2027, which included a commitment to reintroduce a daily service between the two cities by the end of 2024. The service expected to call at Newport, Severn Tunnel Junction, Gloucester, Birmingham New Street, Derby, Sheffield, Doncaster, York and Newcastle. It encompassed the utilisation of either Class 221 Super Voyager or Class 222 Meridian multiple units.
