= Felindre, Swansea =

Coordinates: 51.703°N 3.977°W

Felindre
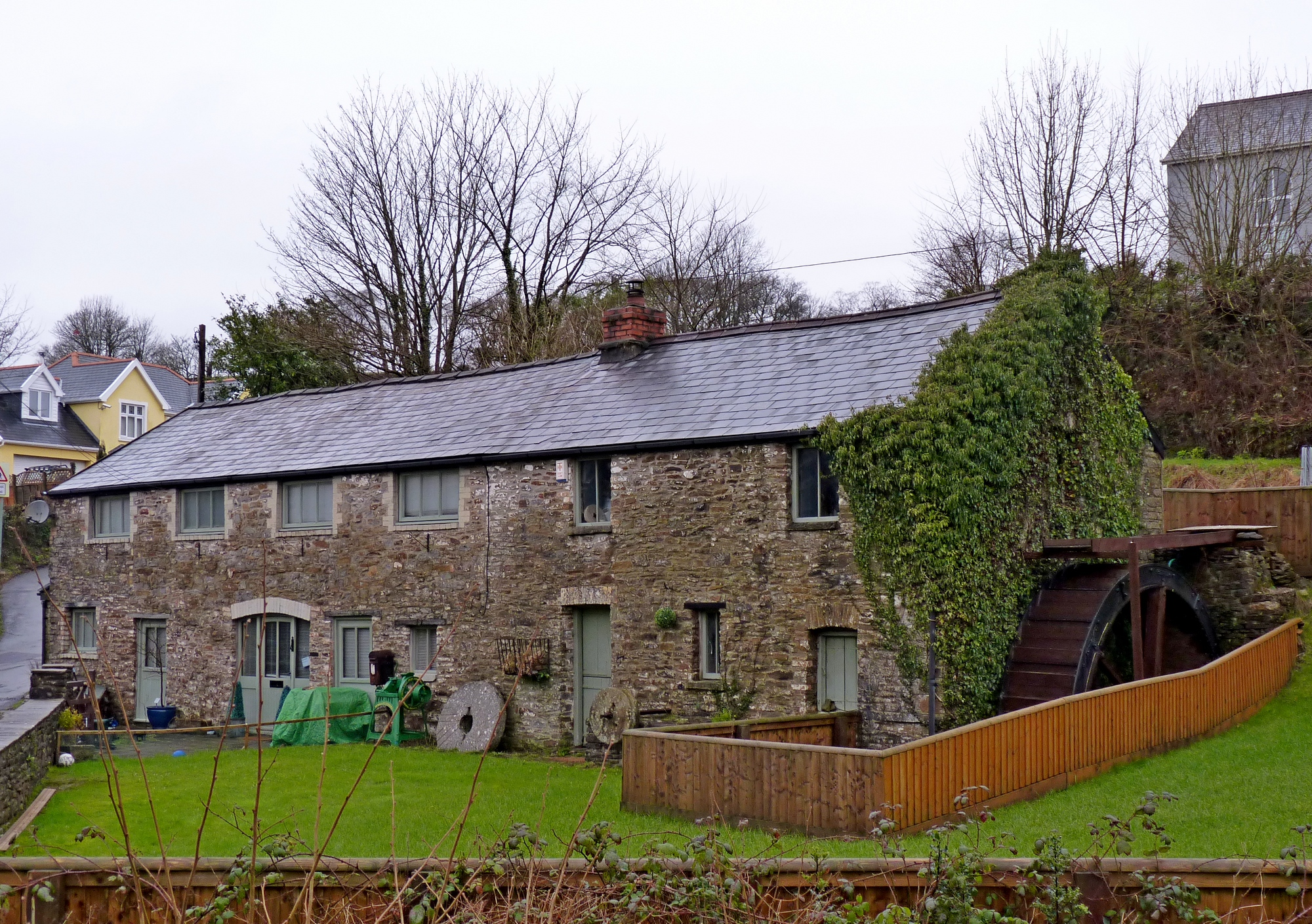
- Felindre watermill

- Location within Swansea
- OS grid reference: SN634023
- Principal area: Swansea
- Preserved county: West Glamorgan
- Country: Wales
- Sovereign state: United Kingdom
- Post town: SWANSEA
- Postcode district: SA5
- Dialling code: 01792
- Police: South Wales
- Fire: Mid and West Wales
- Ambulance: Welsh
- UK Parliament: Gower
- Senedd Cymru – Welsh Parliament: Gower

Felindre is a rural village in the City and County of Swansea, south Wales. Felindre is located in the far north of the city of Swansea, in the electoral ward of Mawr.

The nearby Lower Lliw Reservoirs are a popular venue for walking and fishing. The water mill in the village was working until the late 1960s, there was also once an abattoir and a post office in the village. It also had three shops and a petrol station, which are now all private homes. There is a thriving family run public house in the village, the Shepherds Country Inn. The primary school in the village was Welsh speaking and closed in 2019. There is a monthly farmer's market held on the last Saturday of every month.

== Felindre works site ==
In 1956, the Steel Company of Wales opened a tinplate works at Felindre to complement new facilities at Port Talbot and Trostre. In 1967, the Steel Company of Wales was nationalised, becoming part of British Steel Corporation, which inherited the additional tinplate works at Ebbw Vale Steelworks. By 1970, Felindre works employed 2,500 people and was producing 490,000 tonnes of tinplate per annum. Having already closed the tinplate works at Port Talbot, on review of the three remaining tinplate plants within its South Wales division, in December 1980 it was decided to close the site at Felindre. In March 1981, 1,300 people were made redundant, though 138 were found jobs at Trostre, leaving 768 on site. Production was run down until 1989, when another 108 were given jobs at Trostre. The grounds of the former steelworks played host to the National Eisteddfod 2006.

== Sport ==
In 2006 Felindre was part of the World Rally Championship servicing the rally cars whilst they compete in the Welsh Rally, a round of the (WRC) World Rally Championship. For 2007 the site moved to the Swansea SA1 area.

== Notable people ==
- Air Vice Marshal Meredith Thomas, CSI, CBE, DFC, AFC (1892–1984), senior RAF commander in WWII and flying ace in WWI
- Alan Jones (born 1938), cricketer, played 645 First-class cricket matches

== Future plans ==
A new railway station is planned near the former Felindre works site and Junction 46 of the M4 Motorway.

== See also ==
- Felindre Farchog, a village in Pembrokeshire
- Dre-fach Felindre, a village in Carmarthenshire
