= Lumo (train operating company) =

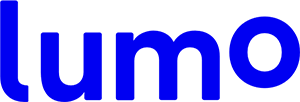

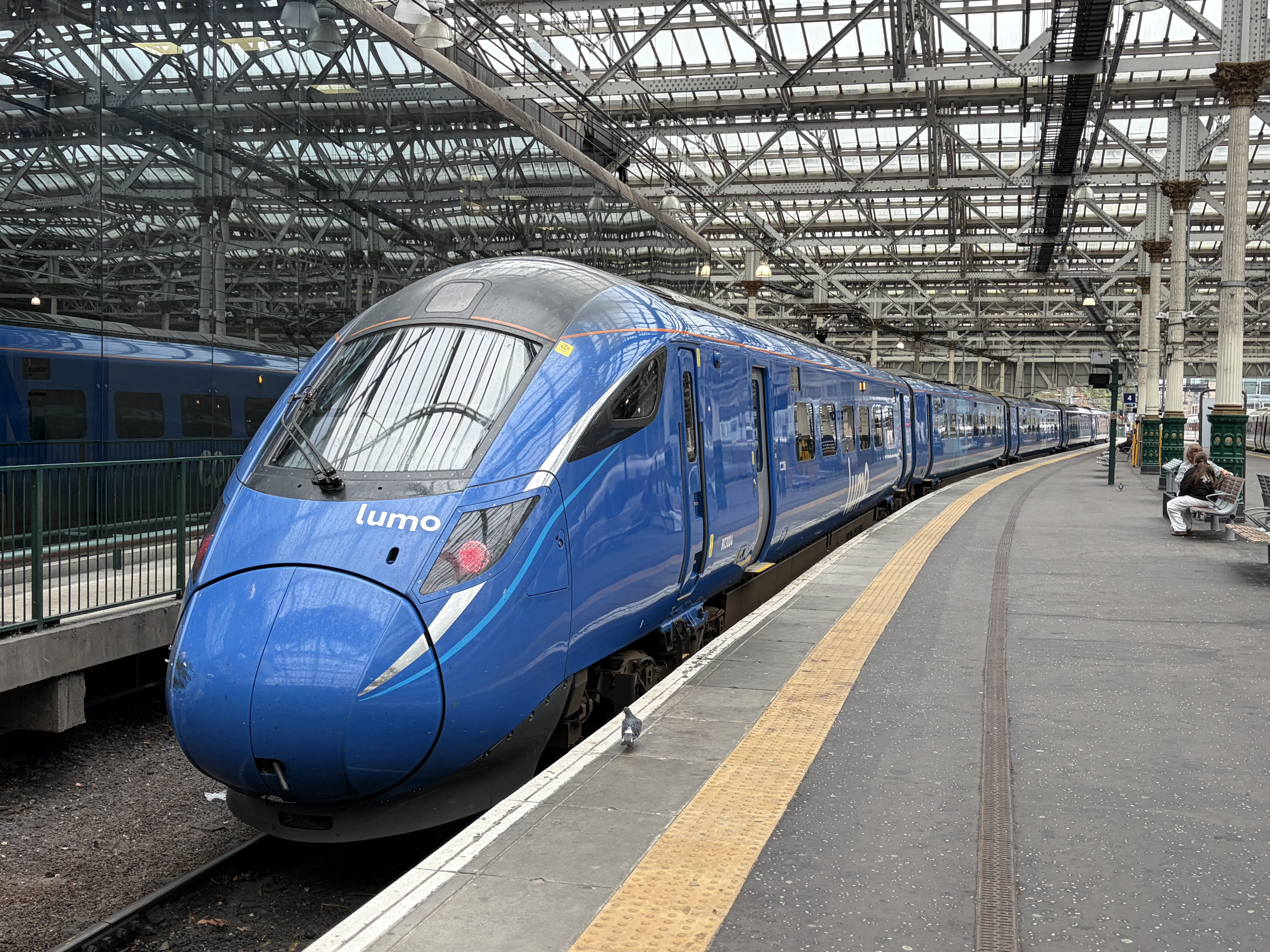
- Class 803 at Edinburgh Waverley

Overview
- Franchises: Open-access operator; Not subject to franchising; 25 October 2021 – 2031
- Main regions: Greater London; North East England; North West England; Scotland
- Other regions: East of England; West Midlands
- Fleet: Class 222, Class 803
- Stations called at: 20
- Parent company: FirstGroup
- Headquarters: Newcastle upon Tyne
- Reporting mark: LD (ECML); LF (WCML)

Other
- Website: www.lumo.co.uk

East Coast Trains Limited and First Rail Stirling Limited, trading as Lumo, is a British open-access operator owned by FirstGroup. It operates passenger trains on the East Coast Main Line between London King's Cross, Edinburgh Waverley and Glasgow Queen Street; and on the West Coast Main Line between London Euston and Stirling. It is headquartered in Newcastle upon Tyne.

Lumo originated in 2015 with the submission of a bid by FirstGroup to the Office of Rail and Road (ORR) to establish a new open-access operator to use additional rail paths on East Coast Main Line. In May 2016, the ORR granted a ten-year track access agreement to the FirstGroup subsidiary East Coast Trains Limited, which would later be branded as Lumo. During March 2019, a £100 million order for five Class 803 electric multiple unit high speed trains was placed to operate Lumo's services.

The company commenced passenger services between London and Edinburgh in 2021, later adding a number of expansions. More services began calling at Stevenage from December 2025, with some now originating or terminating at Glasgow Queen Street. Initial West Coast Main Line operations followed in June 2026. The company differs from competitors on its routes by offering only standard class seating, and by not utilising guards on its trains.

== History ==
In 2015, following an announcement by the Office of Rail and Road (ORR) that open-access operators would be permitted to bid for additional rail paths on the East Coast Main Line alongside the existing franchised operator, Virgin Trains East Coast (VTEC), the British transport conglomerate FirstGroup submitted a proposal to operate services between London and Edinburgh.

Under the proposal, FirstGroup planned to compete directly with existing road, rail, and air services by offering all-standard class accommodation with an average ticket price of approximately £25. A rival application from Alliance Rail Holdings was also submitted but was rejected by the ORR after projected revenue abstraction from VTEC (i.e. reduction in VTEC's revenue as a result of the new operation) was estimated at £115 million. By comparison, FirstGroup's proposal was forecast to abstract £7.9 million.

In May 2016, the ORR granted a ten-year track access agreement to FirstGroup subsidiary East Coast Trains Limited, permitting it to operate up to five services in each direction from May 2021. This made it the third open-access operator on the East Coast Main Line, following Hull Trains and Grand Central. At the time, it was acknowledged that services would not commence until 2021 to allow for the procurement of new-build rolling stock.

In September 2021, the company confirmed its launch under the Lumo brand, described as a combination of “luminosity” (Lu) and “motion” (mo). Two months later, Lumo relocated to its permanent headquarters in Newcastle upon Tyne. In June 2022, Martijn Gilbert was appointed managing director of both Lumo and Hull Trains, succeeding Phil Cameron and David Gibson respectively.

In February 2024, Lumo announced that it was in discussions to extend some Edinburgh services to Glasgow. This was followed in May 2024 by proposals to operate services from London Euston to Rochdale via Manchester Victoria from 2027, subject to ORR approval.

In December 2024, following FirstGroup's acquisition of Grand Union Trains, it was announced that the proposed London Paddington to Carmarthen service would be operated by Lumo, with five return services daily. At the same time, an application was submitted to the ORR for track access rights to operate five daily return services between London Paddington and Paignton, along with a sixth service to Highbridge and Burnham.

In June 2025, again following the acquisition of Grand Union Trains, it was confirmed that the proposed London Euston–Stirling service would also operate under the Lumo brand. The service, which commenced on 25 May 2026, calls at Milton Keynes Central, Nuneaton, Crewe, Preston, Carlisle, Lockerbie, Motherwell, Whifflet, Greenfaulds, Larbert and Stirling. Four return services are planned to operate Monday to Saturday, with three on Sundays, alongside an additional return service between Preston and London Euston.

From December 2025, some existing services between King's Cross and Edinburgh were extended to Glasgow Queen Street via Falkirk High. On weekdays, one southbound and two northbound services operate; on Sundays, one service runs in each direction from 2 January 2026, while no services operate on Saturdays.

== Services ==
On 26 May 2021, the first trial runs of the company's Class 803 high speed multiple units on the national rail network were conducted.

On 25 October 2021, the inaugural service commenced; initially, Lumo operated two trains per day in each direction on most week days, although Saturdays saw only one train being run for a time. From the onset of operations, the service rate was set to be progressively increased up to running five trains each way by early 2022. At launch, Lumo promised that 60% of fares would be offered for no more than £30, with a cap of £69 on one-way tickets. According to the company, ticket sales around the launch date had exceeded expectations, and it had experienced particularly high demand for its weekend services.

=== East Coast ===
As of December 2025, Lumo's timetable sees trains depart each terminus at off-peak times. The vast majority of journeys run the full route from Edinburgh to London, calling at Morpeth and Newcastle. A number of services additionally call at Stevenage, for pick-up only on northbound services, and drop-off only for southbound trains. Two trains per day northbound extend to Glasgow Queen Street and one train per day starts from there. The fastest service reaches London from Edinburgh in 4 hours and 3 minutes, although the majority take around 4 hours and 30 minutes.

Route	Trains per day	Calling at
London King's Cross – Edinburgh Waverley and Glasgow Queen Street	6	Stevenage, Newcastle, Morpeth, Edinburgh Waverley, Haymarket, Falkirk High

=== West Coast ===
In July 2026, Lumo launched a service between London Euston and Stirling via the West Coast Main Line, with four departures per day from each of the termini and a further daily service between Preston and Euston.

Route	Trains per day	Calling at
London Euston – Stirling	4	Milton Keynes Central, Nuneaton, Crewe, Preston, Carlisle, Lockerbie, Motherwell, Whifflet, Greenfaulds, Larbert

== Operations ==
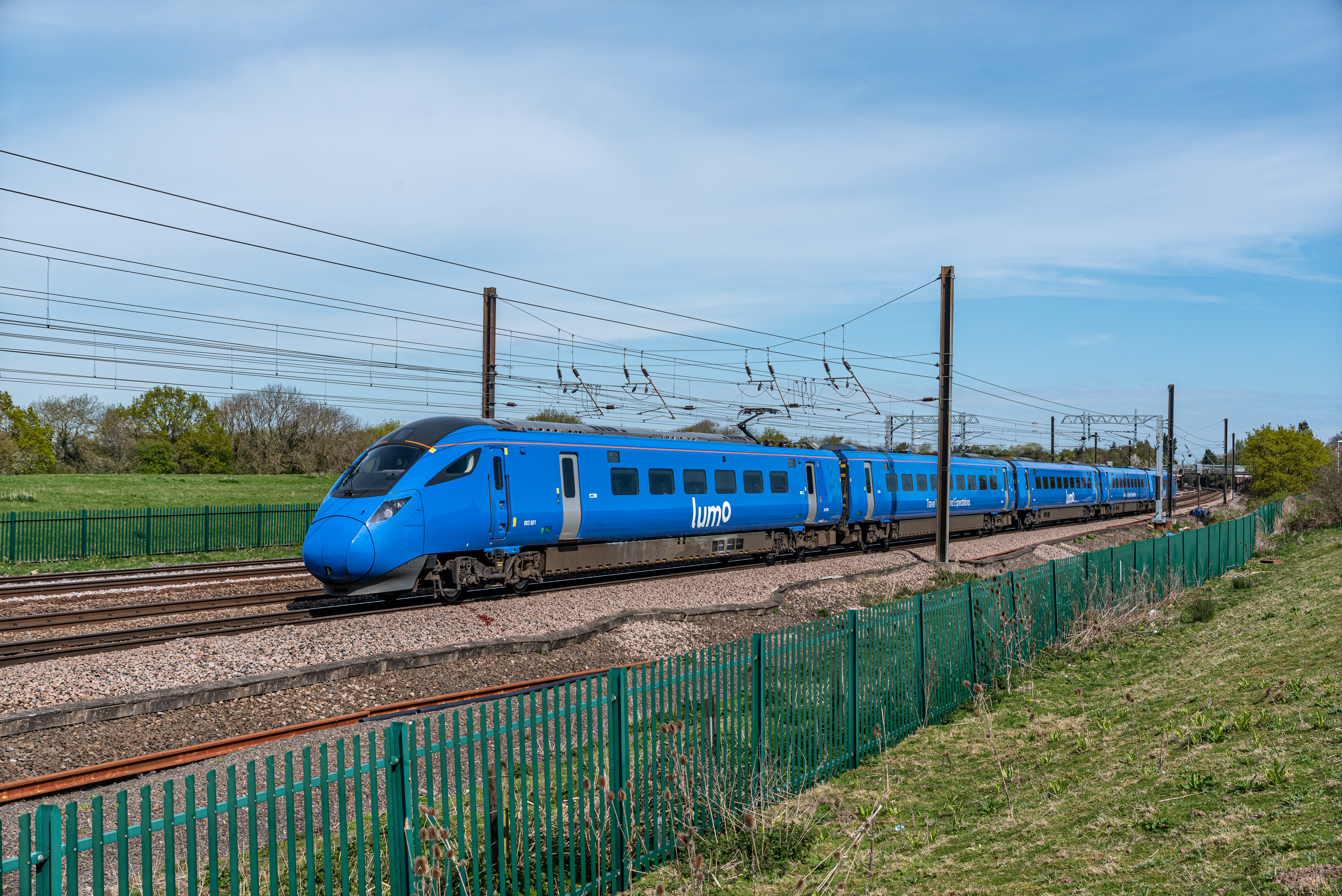
Lumo Class 803

Lumo offers a single-class service. The company promotes itself as a “digital-first” operator, emphasising its focus on paperless ticketing options and its website. It also participates in the National Rail system and accepts interoperable tickets.

The company uses driver-controlled operation, whereby the driver operates the train doors and is responsible for punctuality, as opposed to the more traditional guard. Two onboard staff known as Customer Service Ambassadors are also rostered on each service to perform duties such as checking tickets and providing catering services.

A two-by-two seating arrangement is fitted throughout all five carriages, with a pair of large tables per carriage. The seats are furnished with individual lighting, 230 volt electricity sockets, fold-down tables and free Wi-Fi network. Priority seats are also available, along with two spaces for wheelchair users, on each train. Onboard catering consists of an at-seat trolley service.

== Rolling stock ==
=== Current ===
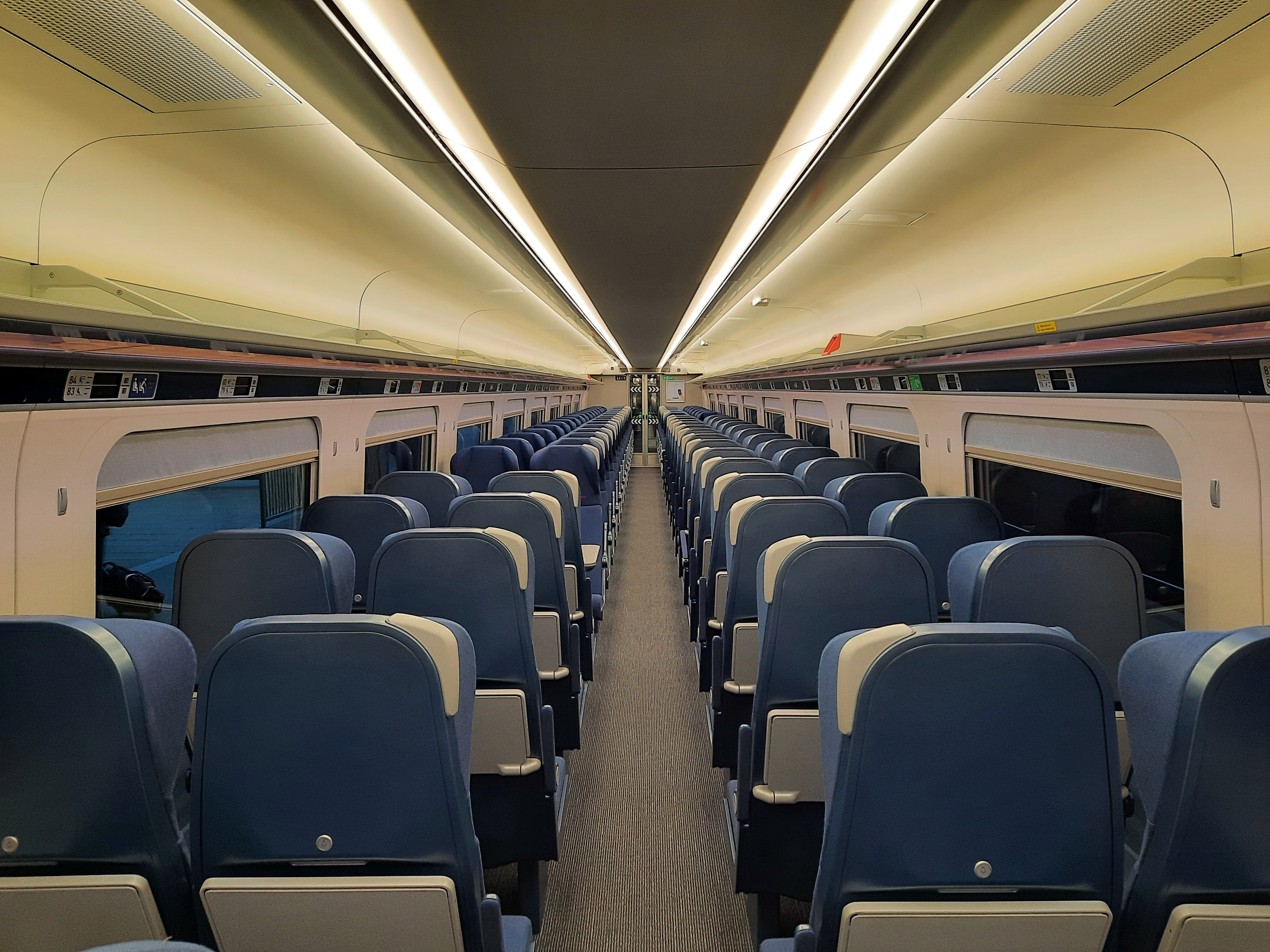
The interior of a Lumo Class 803

Services are operated by a fleet of 125 mph (200 km/h) Class 803 electric multiple unit trains, ordered in March 2019 at a cost of £100 million, financed by the rail leasing company Beacon Rail. While based on the same Hitachi AT300 design as the Class 801 Azuma trains operated on the East Coast Main Line by franchised operator London North Eastern Railway (LNER), they are not fitted with an auxiliary diesel engine, but instead feature batteries intended solely to power onboard facilities in case of overhead line equipment failure. Other changes include an all-standard class seating configuration, as well as the lack of a galley area, although catering services are provided through the use of a trolley service. The Class 803 also features air conditioning, power sockets and Wi-Fi provision.

Family	Class	Image	Type	Top speed		Number	Carriages	Route	Built
Family	Class	Image	Type	mph	km/h	Number	Carriages	Route	Built
Bombardier Voyager	222		DEMU	125	200	5	6	Stirling – London Euston	2003–2005
Hitachi AT300	803		EMU	125	200	5	5	Glasgow Queen Street – London King's Cross	2020–2021

=== Named units ===
Unit number	Date	Name	Ref.
803 004	13 August 2024	Whisky Express	
803 005	19 May 2023	Proudly from Newcastle the home of Stephenson's Works bicentenary 1823–2023	

=== Liveries carried ===
Unit number	Date	Name	Description	Image	Ref.
803 003	16 June 2023	Pride Partnerships	Progress Pride Flag (under driver's side windows and on the 'O' on each carriage)		
803 004	13 August 2024	Whisky Express	English and Scottish crossed flags (under driver's side windows)		
803 004	13 July 2025	The Smurfs	Promotional livery for Smurfs movie, released 18 July 2025 (driving cars)		

=== Future ===
On 6 December 2024, FirstGroup announced the acquisition of 14 further brand-new five-car Hitachi AT300 Class 80x units for its growing open access operations. These will be used on the London Paddington - Carmarthen services and to strengthen Lumo and Hull Trains services from London King's Cross. The 13 options for additional units can be activated subject to Lumo receiving a track access extension on the WCML beyond 2030 which would replace the Class 222.

Family	Class	Image	Type	Top speed		Number	Carriage	Routes	Into Service	Built
Family	Class	Image	Type	mph	km/h	Number	Carriage	Routes	Into Service	Built
Hitachi AT300	TBA		BMU	125	200	14 (+ 13 options) for Lumo and Hull Trains	5	Intercity routes (Great Western Main Line & East Coast Main Line)	TBA	TBA

== Accidents and incidents ==
On 17 April 2022, a Lumo-operated Class 803 passed through a set of points at Peterborough railway station at 75 mph (121 km/h) where there was a speed restriction of 25 mph (40 km/h). Some passengers were thrown from their seats and sustained minor injuries. The Rail Accident Investigation Branch opened an investigation into the incident. The report into the incident, published in July 2023, concluded that the driver of the train failed to realize the train's route through the station was set to take the diverting route via platform 1. Due to a train ahead, common advanced indicators of a train being directed to a diverging route, such as flashing yellow aspects were not active on approach to the station, and the typical route for this train was via platform 3 as it did not stop at Peterborough. For reasons that couldn't be determined, the driver failed to reduce speed in reaction to the signal at the junction P468, which indicated that the train would take the diverging route.

== Artwork ==
In 2026, an artwork, commissioned by Lumo to commemorate the opening of the Stirling to London service, was unveiled at the Golden Lion Hotel in Stirling. It was created by train driver Bessie Matthews and depicts scenes from various locations along the route.
