= Margam Knuckle Yard =

Freight railway yard, South Wales

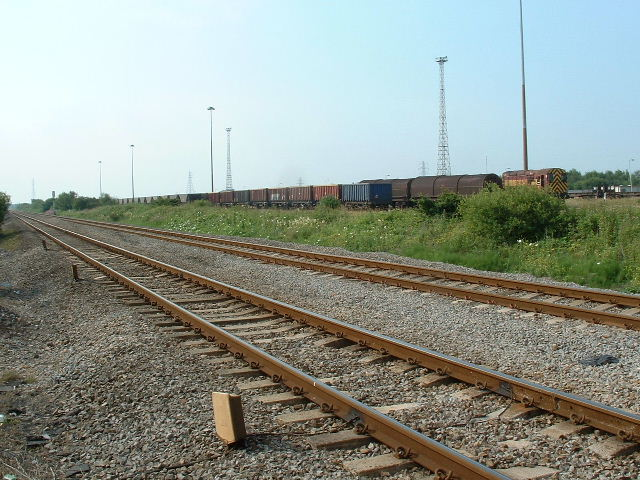
- Interactive map of Margam Knuckle Yard

Location
- Location: Margam, South Wales
- Coordinates: 51.56613°N 3.76831°W

Characteristics
- Operator: DB Schenker Rail (UK)

Margam Knuckle Yard is a railway yard in Margam, South Wales, on the South Wales Main Line, operated by DB Schenker Rail (UK). The yard is the major freight yard of the region, handling all of the rail freight movements from Port Talbot Steelworks, and most of the railfreight traffic around South Wales.

== Background ==
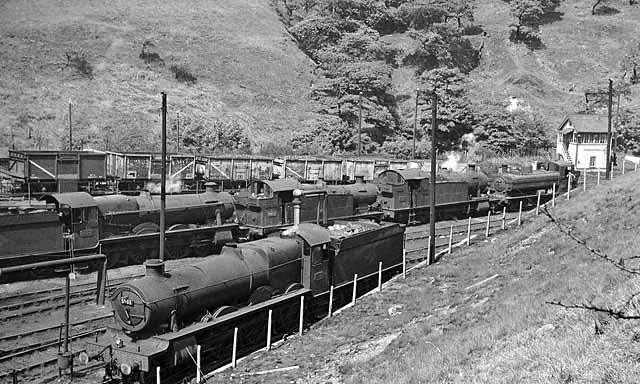
Duffryn No.1 Yard, 1 June 1962

The development of Port Talbot as an industrial centre started from the turn of the 20th century. The need for iron and steel producers to now import both ore and fuel, brought about the development of Port Talbot Steelworks, Margam Steelworks and associated expansion of the Port of Port Talbot.

In 1894, the Port Talbot Railway and Docks Company had been formed to directly link the port to the various competitive railways, particularly the South Wales Mineral Railway and the Rhondda and Swansea Bay Railway; and the coal mines and ironworks in the surrounding Llynfi and Garw valley areas, via the Duffryn Llynvi and Porthcawl Railway. This facilitated a further extension to the dock facilities in 1898.

The PTR&D had developed extensive railway yards surrounding the docks, particularly the pair of Duffryn Yards, Duffryn No.1 and Duffryn No.2. The PTR&D was absorbed by the Great Western Railway on 1 January 1922.

== Development ==
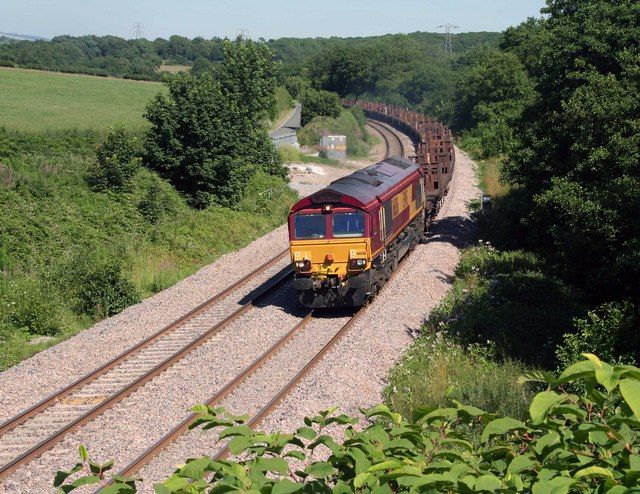
EWS Class 66 heads towards Margam Knuckle Yard with a load of steel empties

By the 1950s, a combination of factors was bringing about the need for the redevelopment of transport facilities at Margam. The steelworks had integrated under the British Steel Corporation, and the post-war planned Abbey Works had opened in 1951, and was fully operational by 1953.

Further increases in the volume of goods handling at the port were restricted by the docks inability to handle the new bulk carriers, with the old docks unable to accept a ship of greater than 10,000 tonnes deadweight (DWT). In 1966, work commenced on the construction of the new Port Talbot Tidal Harbour, south-west of the existing docks system. Completed in 1970, it was the first dry-bulk cargo terminal in the UK capable of accepting ships in excess of 100,000 tonnes deadweight (DWT).

British Railways was modernising freight distribution, with the former bespoke creation of manually loaded wagons being replaced by larger, bogeyed bulk-freight wagons that were automatically loaded. This resulted in a need for both larger yards to handle the larger wagons, and fewer yards as high speed freight traffic ran between them to reduce speed of delivery for the customer. BSC was becoming BR's most important customer, with coal traffic quickly falling.

Hence, in 1960 the development and construction of Margam Knuckle Yard on a former landfill site to the west, along the lines of the PTR&D towards the Llynvi and Ogmore Railway, consolidated what was one of a series of new rail yard developments that supported major steel making facilities in the UK. The development at Margam also included the redevelopment of locomotive maintenance facilities, with the co-development of Margam TMD.

== Operations ==
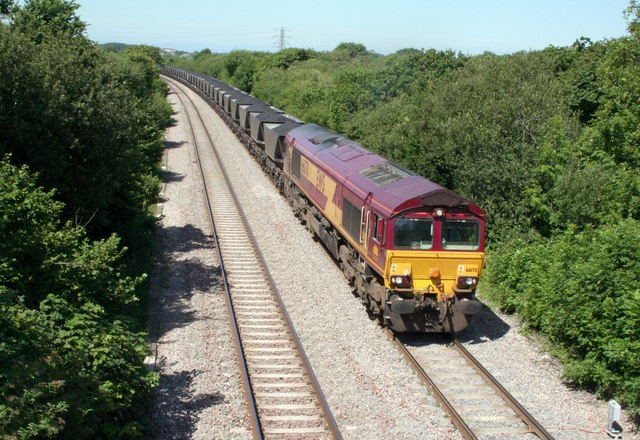
EWS Class 66 climbs Stormy Bank with a full load of Merry-Go-Round coal hoppers, after leaving Margam Knuckle Yard

The strategy of BSC had resulted in an integrated facility plan, with Port Talbot at the centre of steel making system:

- 4.7million tonnes of raw iron ore used at Port Talbot/Llanwern steelworks
- 3.0million tonnes of steel produced at Port Talbot
- Steel output was then taken by railway to:
  - Shotton for coating
  - Trostre for tin plating
  - Ebbw Vale rolling and coating
  - Direct to the Midlands motor industry, via Toton Marshalling Yards

However, British Rails biggest problem was the 1.7million tonnes of raw iron ore required to be transported by rail to Llanwern Steelworks. Marshalling 27 × 100-tonne iron ore tipplers, the train was initially headed by three Class 37/0's, which continually caused problems with their couplings. The amount of power was required to climb Stormy Bank, located just west of Margam, where the train would only reach 8 miles per hour (13 km/h) at the top. Eventually replaced by two Class 56's, drivers reported that this combination could reach 12 miles per hour (19 km/h). After experimentation with two refurbished Class 37/7's, the company specially hired-in National Power's newly purchased Class 59/2. By January 2008, EWS was handling all 4.7million tonnes of steel product using either Class 60 or Class 66. With the closure of Margam TMD, locomotive maintenance had moved to Knuckle, with C-Class services and brake tests requiring locomotives to be shipped to Toton TMD.

Margam Knuckle handles other goods shipped through the port, as well as regional traffic including shipments to/from RNAD Trecwn.

The yard is about 1 mile (1.6 km) east of Port Talbot Parkway, with few facilities and no bridges by which rail spotters can see operations. However, there is a public footpath that crosses the Northern end of the marshalling yard.

== See also ==
- List of rail yards
- Rail transport in Great Britain
