= Carmarthen railway station =

Railway station in Carmarthenshire, Wales

Carmarthen Welsh: Caerfyrddin
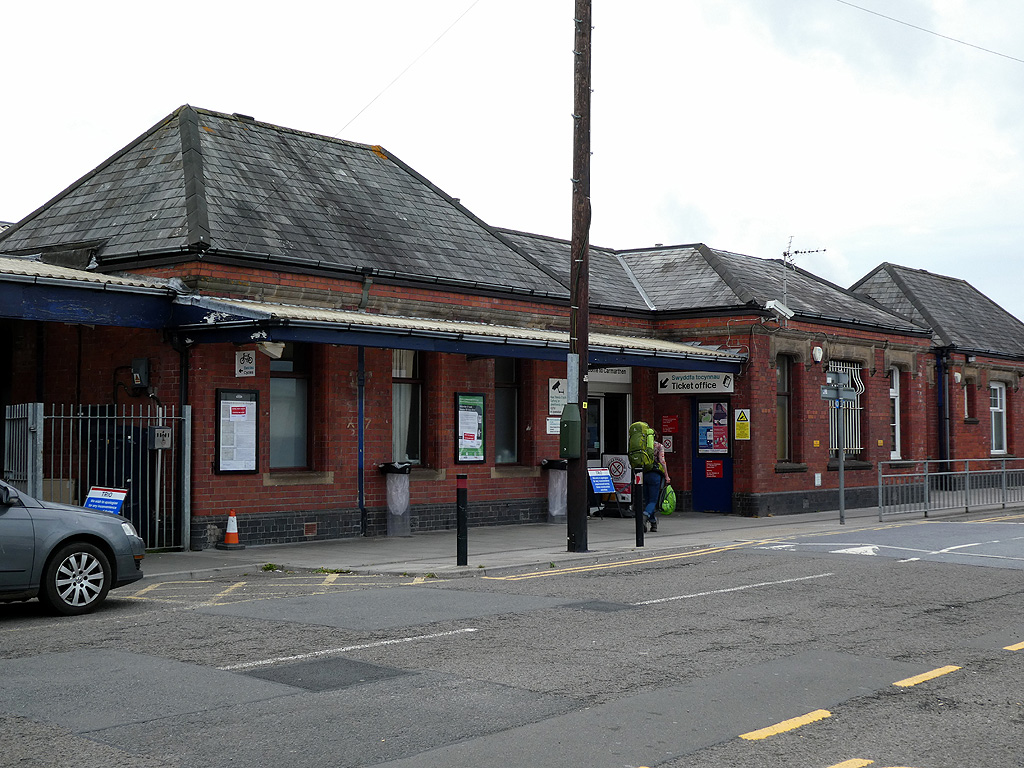

General information
- Location: Carmarthen, Carmarthenshire; Wales
- Coordinates: 51.853°N 4.306°W
- Grid reference: SN412196
- Manager: Transport for Wales
- Platforms: 2

Other information
- Station code: CMN
- Classification: DfT category D

Key dates
- 1860: first station opened
- 1 July 1902: second station opened

Passengers
- 2020/21: ▼76,852
- Interchange: ▼2,120
- 2021/22: ▲0.256 million
- Interchange: ▲8,420
- 2022/23: ▲0.293 million
- Interchange: ▲9,634
- 2023/24: ▲0.374 million
- Interchange: ▲13,344
- 2024/25: ▲0.440 million
- Interchange: ▼10,963
Location
Notes
- Passenger statistics from the Office of Rail and Road

Carmarthen railway station is a stop on the West Wales Line, serving the town of Carmarthen, Wales. It is sited south of the River Towy, 245 miles 55 chains (395.4 km) from London Paddington, on the route via Stroud. The station is operated by Transport for Wales, which operates the majority of services; Great Western Railway also runs a limited service to London Paddington.

== History ==
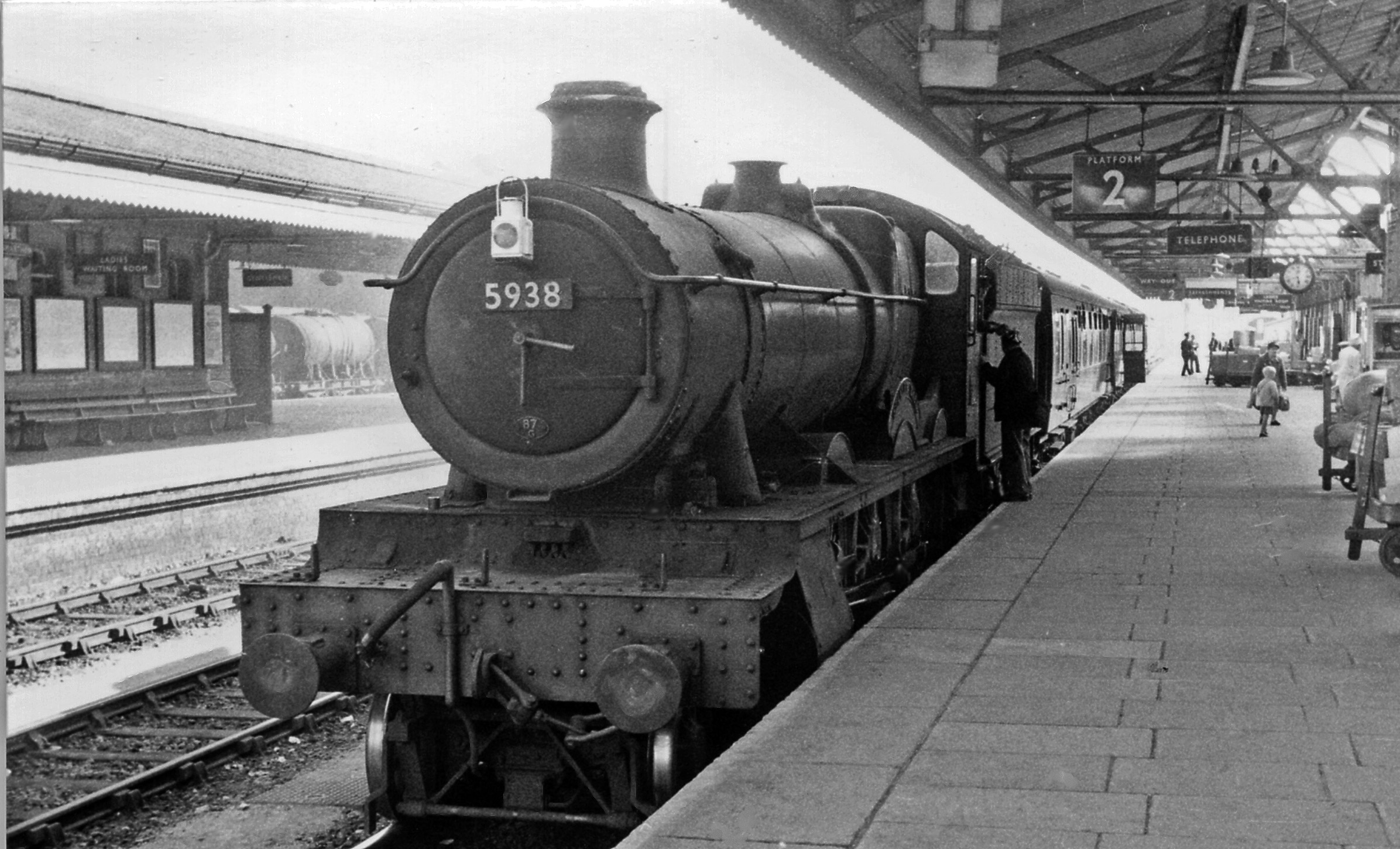
A stopping train from Swansea in 1962

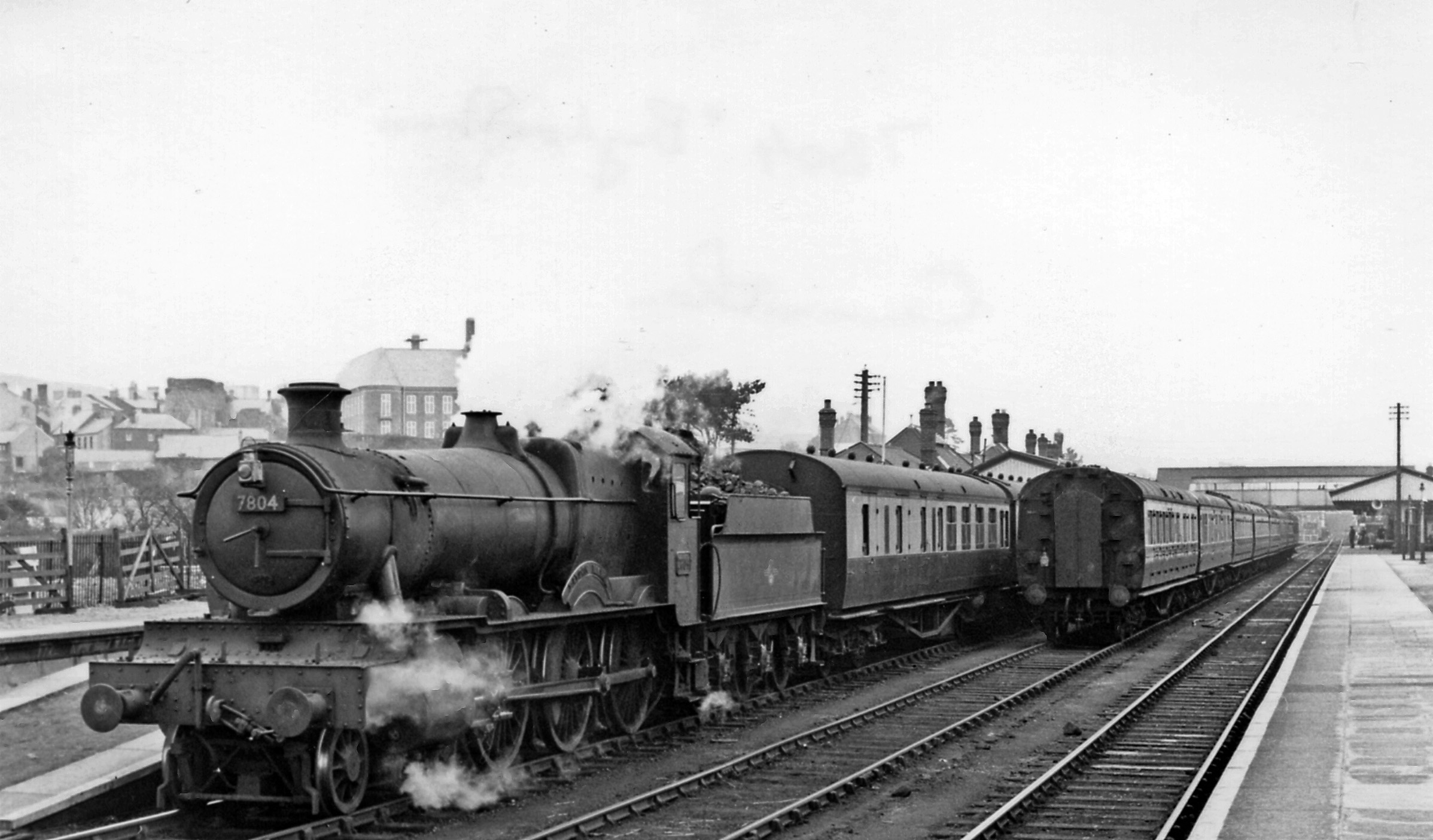
A stopping train for Milford Haven in 1958

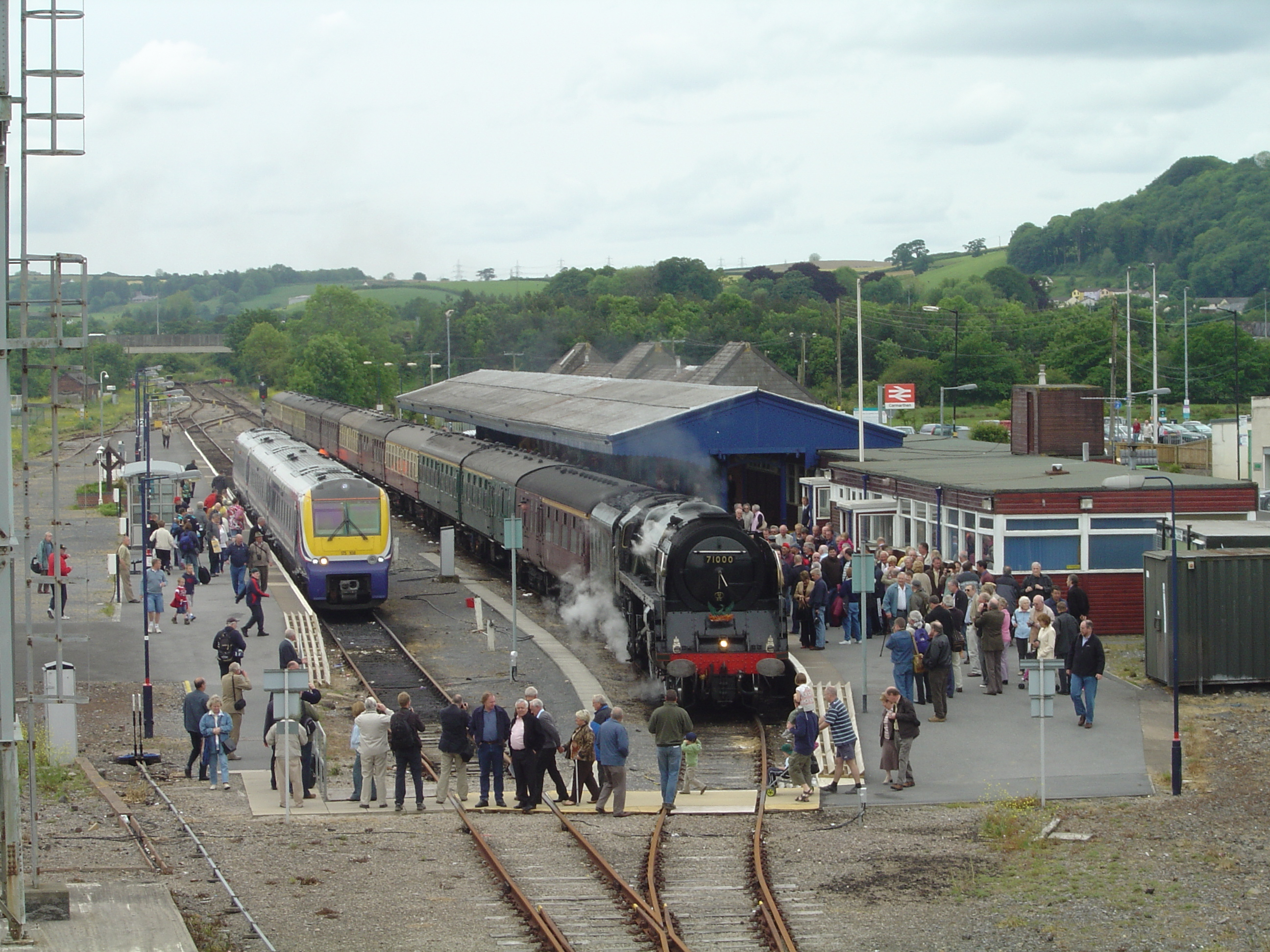
71000 Duke of Gloucester, 26 May 2007

=== South Wales Railway ===
The present station is the third to serve the town and dates from 1902, although the South Wales Railway's main line from Swansea to Neyland reached Carmarthen some fifty years earlier with the first train to Carmarthen in 1852. This original station had been built with westward expansion in mind and was situated at the base of the triangular junction, half a mile south of the present station and poorly sited for the town.

=== Carmarthen and Cardigan Railway ===
A second station, Carmarthen Town, was opened by the Carmarthen and Cardigan Railway in 1860 on its route northwards towards Cynwyl Elfed and Pencader. It was much better sited for the town, being on the opposite side of the river, and this remained in use until its replacement by the current station shortly after the turn of the century. Town station did however remain in use for goods traffic thereafter beyond the closure of the final portion of the line in September 1973, until the goods yard closed around 1981; the single track girder bridge over the River Tywi was removed subsequently during 1983.

The Carmarthen and Cardigan Railway, in spite of its name, never actually reached Cardigan, as it was constructed only as far as Newcastle Emlyn which was reached only in 1895. Cardigan was eventually served instead by the winding Whitland and Cardigan Branch Line from Whitland, the primary junction in Pembrokeshire. The C&CR did however link up with the ill-fated Manchester and Milford Railway at Pencader, putting the town on a through route to Aberystwyth by 1867.

=== Other railways ===
Another outlet to the north was the Llanelly Railway's branch from Llandeilo, which reached Abergwili Junction in 1864; its trains reached Town station by means of running powers following its takeover by the London & North Western Railway (LNWR) in 1873. The final link in the chain of lines to the north was added in 1911, when a branch line from Lampeter to Aberaeron was opened by the Lampeter, Aberayron and New Quay Light Railway. This was worked by the Great Western Railway from the outset, as the company had by this time absorbed the other lines mentioned (apart from the Llandeilo branch, which remained in LNWR hands until the 1923 Grouping).

=== Closures ===
None of the lines to the north survive; the first round of closures having begun as early as May 1951, when the Aberaeron line lost its passenger trains. The Newcastle Emlyn line followed suit in September 1952, whilst the Llandeilo branch went in September 1963 and the 'main line' to Aberystwyth in February 1965, although milk trains continued to operate as far as Pont Llanio (near Tregaron) on the Aberystwyth main line until 1970 and to Newcastle Emlyn and to Felinfach on the Aberaeron branch until September 1973.

This left only the original South Wales Railway main line to serve the station and left it as a terminus at the end of short spur from the main line at which all trains have to reverse before continuing their journeys. This was not so much of a problem with diesel multiple units, but led to the need for a run-round of locomotive-hauled trains which were regularly used until the mid-1980s. Only two of the five original platforms here (the former platforms 2 and 3) are now used, with the majority of trains using the former down main platform (now numbered 1) where the main facilities are located. The other active platform (formerly platform 3, now renumbered 2) is used when two trains are scheduled to call at the same time (also for unit stabling) – it is linked to platform one by a barrow crossing that spans the shunting neck that is used for locos to run around their trains. This is the sole remnant of the former route north.

=== Gwili Railway ===
Historically, the line to Aberystwyth and Llandeilo continued beyond the station across the River Towy, past the site of the goods yard (now a builders yard). It then ran through a cutting, which has since been buried under the Carmarthen eastern by-pass dual carriageway, as far as the former Abergwili Junction.

The Aberystwyth line then turned north out to Bronwydd Arms. From Abergwili Junction northwards, the railway trackbed resumes and is owned by the preserved Gwili Railway which runs preserved trains along part of the Aberystwyth line, through the valley of the River Gwili, from Abergwili Junction, through Bronwydd Arms and Llwyfan Cerrig, to as far as Danycoed en route, close to Cynwyl Elfed.

The Gwili Railway aims to restore a further 3 1/2 miles (6 km) of track, again following the course of the River Gwili, past Cynwyl Elfed and further up the valley to Llanpumpsaint.

== Facilities ==
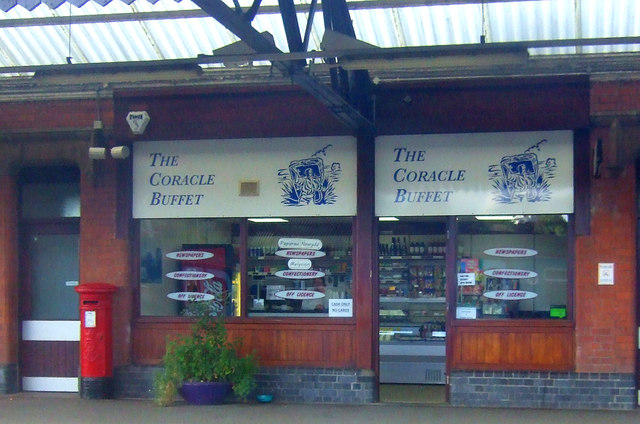
Buffet and newsagents shop on platform 1 (October 2019)

The current station is fully staffed, with the ticket office on platform 1 staffed all week. A self-service ticket machine is provided for use and for collecting pre-paid tickets. A buffet and newsagents, The Coracle Buffet, is available here, along with toilets and a waiting room on platform 1; platform 2 has a shelter and bench seating.

Train running information is provided by digital CIS displays, timetable posters and automated announcements. Step-free access is available to both platforms, though platform 2 requires the use of a foot crossing; wheelchair users are advised not to use this without assistance. Station signs are bilingual, in English and Welsh.

== Services ==
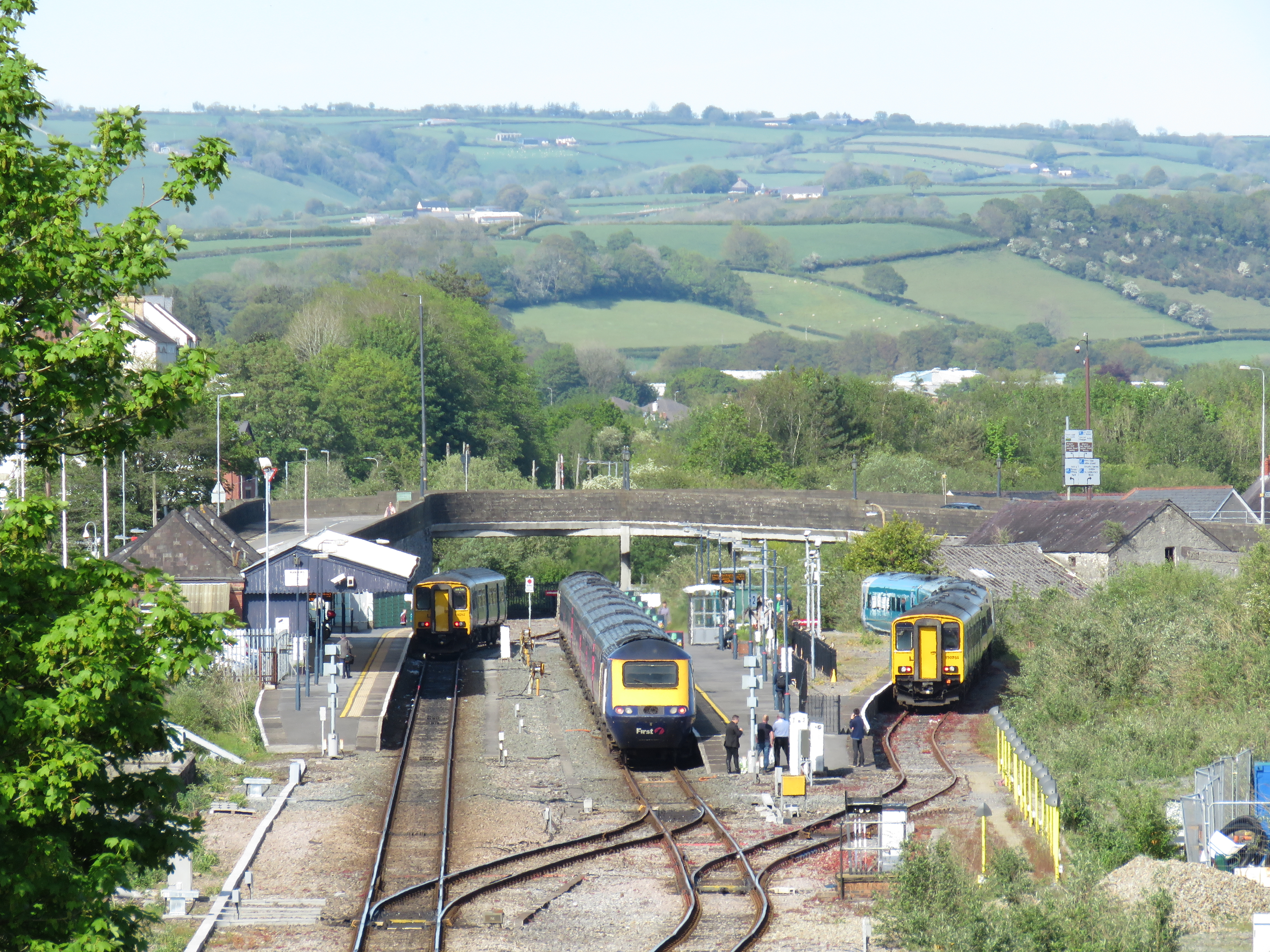
A wide view of the station

Services are operated by two train operating companies:

- Transport for Wales operates regular services between Pembroke Dock, Milford Haven, Fishguard Harbour, Swansea and Cardiff Central; some services continue onto Hereford, Crewe and Manchester Piccadilly.
- Great Western Railway operates six services per day to London Paddington, with four on Sundays.

The majority of local train services west of Carmarthen are timed to connect with the London Paddington services at either Swansea or Cardiff Central.

=== Future ===
In December 2022, the Office of Rail Regulation approved for Grand Union to commence a new service from Paddington to Carmarthen, in partnership with Spanish rail operator Renfe, for which a fleet of new bi-mode trains will be used. The new service is scheduled to commence in December 2024. The service will call at Bristol Parkway, Severn Tunnel Junction, Newport, Cardiff Central, Gowerton and Llanelli en-route to Carmarthen. In December 2024, following FirstGroup's acquisition of Grand Union Trains, it was announced the proposed London Paddington to Carmarthen service would be operated by Lumo.

=== Rail and sea corridor to Ireland ===
Some of Transport for Wales' boat trains to and from Fishguard Harbour serve the station. These connect with the Stena Line ferry to/from Rosslare Europort in Ireland, with a daily morning and evening service in both directions. This route has been in existence since 1906.

Preceding station	National Rail	Following station
Ferryside	Transport for Wales; West Wales line	train reverses
Whitland	Transport for Wales; West Wales line	train reverses
Llanelli	Great Western Railway; London - Carmarthen	Terminus
Pembrey and Burry Port	Great Western Railway; London - Pembroke	train reverses
Whitland	Great Western Railway; London - Pembroke	train reverses
	Future services	
Llanelli	Lumo; London - Carmarthen	Terminus

== Memorial ==
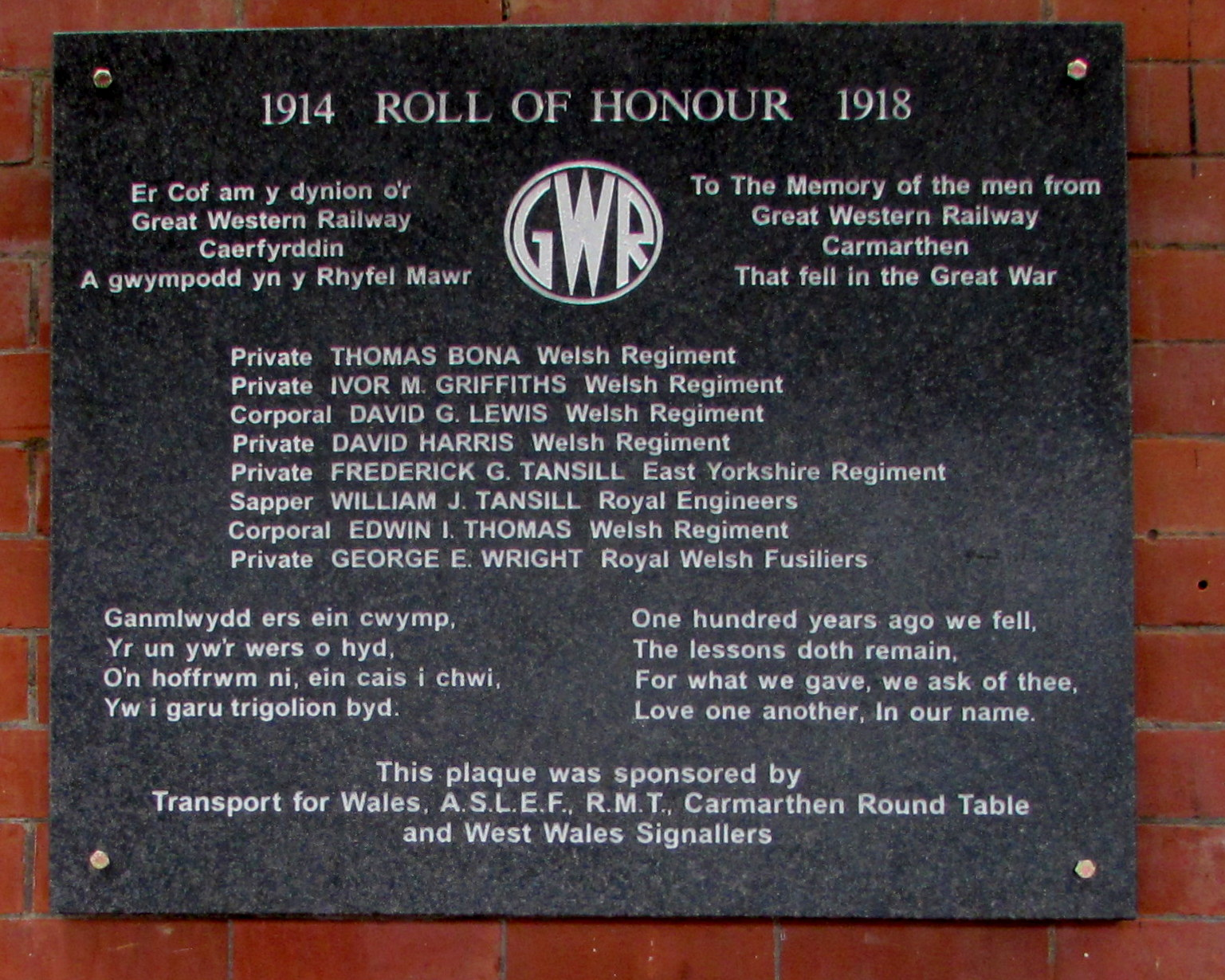
Memorial plaque on the wall of platform 1

In June 2019, a plaque was unveiled at the station to commemorate the eight Great Western Railway workers from Carmarthen who lost their lives in the First World War. This was based on the work of a local train driver who researched the names. The unveiling ceremony was attended by over 100 people including local dignitaries and representatives from the Armed Forces.
