= List of places in Neath Port Talbot (categorised) =

This is a list of places in the Neath Port Talbot County Borough in Wales.

== Administrative divisions ==
=== Electoral wards ===
This is a list of electoral wards in Neath Port Talbot:

== Notable places ==
This is a list of notable places for historical, cultural or topical reasons:

- Margam Abbey
- Neath Abbey
- Port Talbot steelworks

== Buildings and structures ==
- Margam Castle
- Neath Castle

=== Covered markets and shopping malls ===
- Aberafan Centre, Port Talbot
- Neath Indoor Market
- Rheola Market

== Industrial estates & business parks ==
- Baglan Energy Park
- Baglan Industrial Park
- Port Talbot Industrial Estate
- Swansea Gate Business Park

== Geographical ==
=== Rivers and waterways ===
- Neath Canal
- Tennant Canal
- River Afan
- River Neath
- River Tawe
- Bagle Brook

=== Lakes and reservoirs ===
- Eglwys Nunydd

=== Hill and mountains ===
- Mynydd Drummau

== Parks ==
=== Urban parks ===
- Talbot Memorial Park, Port Talbot
- Victoria Gardens, Neath

=== Country parks ===
- Afan Argoed Country Park
- Gnoll Country Park
- Margam Country Park

== Transport ==
=== Major roads ===
- A465 road
- A48 road
- M4 motorway

=== Public transport hubs ===
- Neath railway station
- Victoria Gardens Bus Station, Neath
- Port Talbot Parkway railway station
- Port Talbot Bus Station

=== Railway lines ===
- South Wales Main Line

=== Railway stations ===
- Skewen railway station
- Neath railway station
- Briton Ferry railway station
- Baglan railway station
- Port Talbot Parkway railway station

=== Shipping ===
- Port Talbot Docks
- Briton Ferry Docks

== See also ==
- List of places in Neath Port Talbot for a list of towns and villages
- List of venues in Neath Port Talbot
