= South Wales Railway =

Transport company in United Kingdom

The South Wales Railway (Welsh: Rheilffordd De Cymru) was a main line railway which opened in stages from 1850, connecting the Great Western Railway from Gloucester to South Wales. It was constructed on the broad gauge. An original aspiration was to reach Fishguard to engender an Irish ferry transit and transatlantic trade, but the latter did not materialise for many years, and never became an important sector of the business. Neyland was the western terminus of the line until 1906.

The company amalgamated with the Great Western Railway in 1863 and the track was converted to narrow (standard) gauge in 1873. In 1922–1923, most of the independent Welsh railways were constituents of the new enlarged Great Western Railway, enabling rationalisation and benefits of scale. Nearly all of the original main line of the South Wales Railway remains in use at present (2020).

== Proposals ==
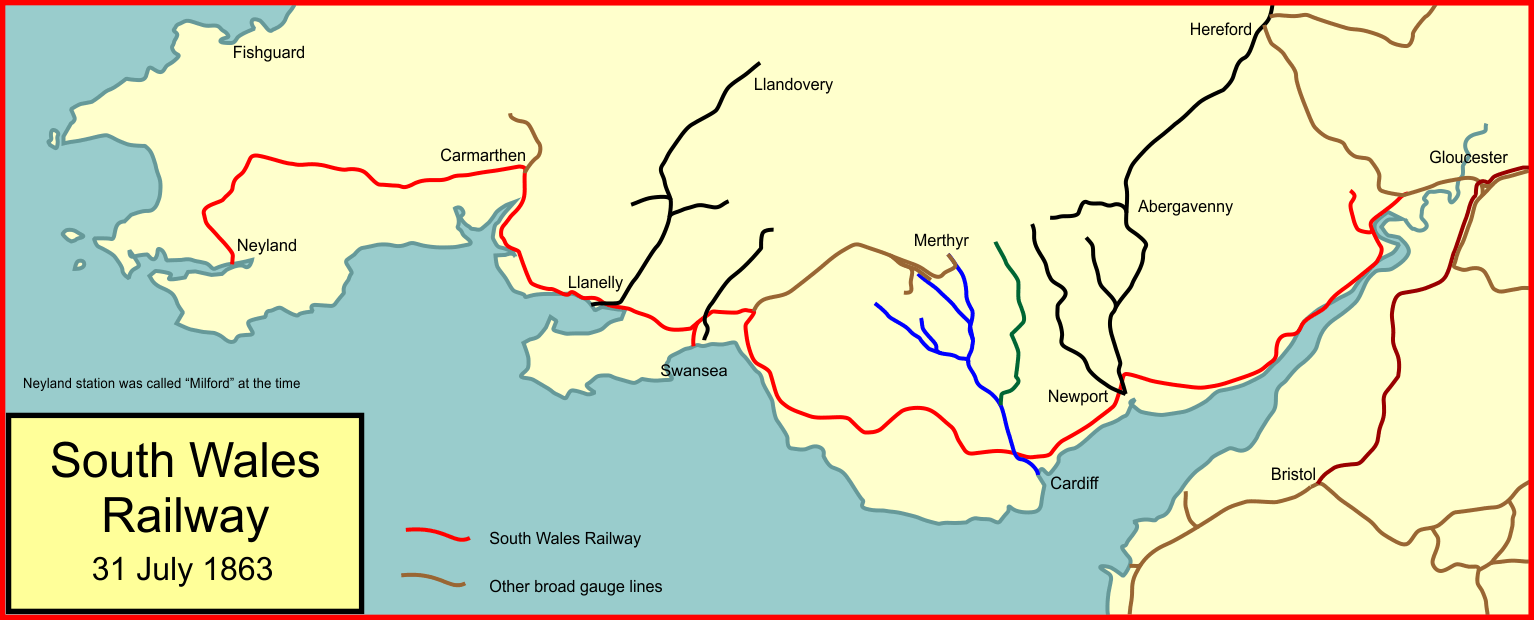
The South Wales Railway system at amalgamation with the GWR in 1863

The prospectus of the South Wales Railway was issued in the summer of 1844. It proposed a railway with capital of £2,500,000 to run from Standish, on the Cheltenham branch of the Great Western Railway where the Bristol and Gloucester line joins it. Over the River Severn at Hock Cliffe between Fretherne and Awre and then follow the coast to Chepstow, Newport, Cardiff, Bridgend, Aberavon, Neath, Swansea, Carmarthen and Fishguard, with a branch line from near Whitland to Pembroke Dock.

The prospectus was published widely as a newspaper advertisement:

Surveys have been made of the line of country best adapted for accommodating the extensive traffic of the great mineral basin of South Wales, and the important agricultural interests of that country, as well as the intercourse between the ports of Cork, Waterford, Wicklow, Limerick and Wexford, the inland and manufacturing districts of England and the metropolis.

The line was to pass "within an easy distance of Monmouth" and west of Carmarthen, it was proposed

"that the railway shall divide into two branches, one to the naval arsenal of Pembroke and the harbour of Milford Haven Waterway, and the other to Fishguard, whence a communication with the South of Ireland would be effected within six hours."

Chief among the objectives of the line was communication with Ireland; the engineer was Isambard Kingdom Brunel. The project was sponsored by the Great Western Railway and in February 1845 the GWR announced that they had promised £500,000 towards the formation of the company. It was to be "a great national undertaking to connect the South of Ireland as well as South Wales with the Metropolis".

South Wales Railway Act 1845
- Act of Parliament
- Parliament of the United Kingdom
- Long title: An Act for making a Railway to be called "The South Wales Railway."
- Citation: 8 & 9 Vict. c. cxc

Dates
- Royal assent: 4 August 1845

Text of statute as originally enacted

The people of Monmouth were disappointed that the line was not to pass through their town, and they urged a deviation to run through Gloucester, Monmouth and Usk to Caerleon, adding 18 miles to the route and involving considerably worse gradients. The Admiralty objected to the Severn bridge, and the result was that the line was authorised west of Chepstow only, with a branch to Monmouth. The line was to be broad gauge, although this was not explicitly defined in the South Wales Railway Act 1845 (8 & 9 Vict. c. cxc).

In the 1846 session of Parliament, a revised bridge crossing of the Severn at Fretherne was proposed, and alternatively a tunnel. Both options were rejected in Parliament, and the company was obliged to concede the longer route through Gloucester, crossing the Severn there.

A local railway thus became of strategic importance: the Gloucester and Dean Forest Railway had been authorised in 1845 to connect with the Monmouth and Hereford Railway near Grange Court. If the Gloucester and Dean Forest Railway extended southwards to Hagloe Farm, two miles south of Awre, the South Wales Railway could connect there. The arrangement was approved and both companies got their acts of Parliament, the Gloucester and Dean Forest Railway Act 1846 (9 & 10 Vict. c. ccxl) and the South Wales Railway Amendment Act 1846 (9 & 10 Vict. c. ccxxxix) respectively. Soon after gaining royal assent the GWR agreed with the G&DFR that the former would take over the construction and build the line themselves.

South Wales Railway Amendment Act 1846
- Act of Parliament
- Parliament of the United Kingdom
- Long title: An Act for extending the Line of the South Wales Railway, and for making certain Alterations of the said Railway, and certain Branch Railways in connexion therewith.
- Citation: 9 & 10 Vict. c. ccxxxix

Dates
- Royal assent: 27 July 1846

The South Wales Railway Amendment Act 1846 (9 & 10 Vict. c. ccxxxix) also authorised a branch from Landore to Swansea, as the original route had not been intended to enter the town centre, (Note: Swansea gained city status in 1969.) and another from a point near the later Clarbeston Road station to Haverfordwest.

Soon after the passing of the act of Parliament the company agreed with the Gloucester and Dean Forest Railway that the SWR would build the southward extension itself, so that the northern limit of the SWR was to be at Grange Court, about 6 miles from Gloucester.

Agreement was reached with the Great Western Railway that the GWR would lease the SWR on completion of the line to Fishguard, paying 5% on the capital plus half of surplus profits.

=== The track gauge of the South Wales Railway ===
A Gauge Commission had been established by Parliament to consider the desirability of a uniform track gauge for the railways of the United Kingdom, as the negative effect of the difference of gauge between contiguous railways was beginning to show.

The Great Western Railway and companies friendly to it used the broad gauge, while the narrow gauge (later known as standard gauge) was in use on most other lines. Where two lines of different gauges connected, goods and minerals making a through transit had to be physically transshipped, and passengers had to change trains.

The commissioners declared that the break of gauge was "a serious evil" and they recommended that no further railway should be constructed on the broad gauge system, though they hoped that "some equitable means should be found of producing such entire uniformity of gauge or of adopting such other course as would admit of the Narrow Gauge carriages passing, without interruption or danger, along the Broad Gauge Lines."

If implemented, this finding seemed to mean that the South Wales Railway could not be built on the broad gauge, introducing a break of gauge with the parent GWR at Gloucester or Grange Court.

The Lords of the Board of Trade considered the matter, and they modified the policy. It was their opinion that the SWR should be made on the broad gauge, and the resulting Railway Regulation (Gauge) Act 1846 (9 & 10 Vict. c. 57) stated that the railways authorised

... by an Act passed in the last session of Parliament, intituled An Act for making a railway to be called "The South Wales Railway" [and a modifying Act] intituled "An Act for completing the Line of the South Wales Railway", and to authorize the Construction of an Extension and certain Alterations of the said Railway, and certain Branch Railways in Connexion therewith... shall be constructed on the Gauge of Seven Feet. — Railway Regulation (Gauge) Act 1846 (9 & 10 Vict. c. 57)

Accordingly, the line was built on the broad gauge, with far-reaching consequences.

There were prodigious engineering works to be undertaken: the crossing of the River Wye at Chepstow, a large timber viaduct at Newport and a tunnel there, a further large timber viaduct at Landore, and crossings of the River Loughor and River Towy further west. The depressed state of the money market immediately made the raising of subscriptions difficult, and the company suffered a major loss when the timber viaduct at Newport, almost completed, was burnt down on 31 May 1848, being completely destroyed. It had cost £20,000.

A key objective of the promoters of the line was to connect southern Ireland by ferry from Fishguard to a harbour near Wexford. It was hoped that the Post Office contract for the carriage of mails between London and Dublin could be secured for the Great Western Railway and its allies. In Ireland, the Waterford, Wexford, Wicklow and Dublin Railway Company was to handle the traffic. Brunel also hoped that a transatlantic shipping business using Fishguard might be developed.

However, in 1845 there was a catastrophic failure of the potato crop on which a majority of Irish people depended for a living; this resulted in mass starvation and commercial depression, which deepened the following year. The catastrophe is known as the Great Famine of Ireland. The economy in Ireland worsened considerably, at the same time as the general economic climate throughout the United Kingdom declined sharply.

On the Irish side the depression was so extreme that the railway partners considered that it was impossible to proceed with the construction of their railway. Fishguard at the time only had significance as a potential ferry port, and the building of the South Wales Railway to that point would obviously be wasted expenditure, so that the directors decided to cut it short. The GWR guarantee of 5% on capital was only to come into effect when Fishguard was reached by the SWR, so the latter's directors approached the GWR proposing that the guarantee should come into effect when the line reached Swansea instead. The GWR were not agreeable to this, leaving the South Wales Railway in a difficult position; certain persons who were directors of both companies saw that their positions were untenable, and resigned from the SWR, and the hitherto supportive relationship between the two companies now took a seriously unfriendly turn. It was stated that as the GWR had about a quarter of the SWR shareholding, they were being duplicitous in failing to support the abandonment of the Fishguard part of the line.

A committee of shareholders reported their view of the situation:

We have now to report to the proprietors that it is our unanimous opinion... that... any further expenditure on that part of your line to the westward of Swansea, would... be wasteful and unwise in the extreme. Even if the Irish railways, which were expected to bring traffic to the western extremity of the South Wales line, had not been abandoned, we apprehend that... no company, governed by ordinary prudence, would entertain the notion of carrying a line between Swansea and Fishguard.

The Great Western Railway was accused of duplicity:

... and if there were no guarantee in the case, the directors of the Great Western Railway would, as holders of more than one-fourth of the paid-up shares, be the first to urge upon the South Wales Company the abandonment of this portion of the undertaking. That they do not openly adopt this wise course, by meeting our advances to that end, is attributable, we believe, partly to the erroneous supposition that the South Wales Company will break down in the attempt to reach Fishguard, and thus be unable to bring the guarantee into operation ...

SWR directors who were also GWR directors had had an unhealthy influence on the affairs of the SWR:

We recommend the propriety of the retirement of those gentlemen from the Board who represent interests no longer identical with those of the South Wales line proper...

== First sections of line opened ==
=== Chepstow to Swansea ===
The first portion of the line was opened on 18 June 1850, from Chepstow to Swansea. It consisted of 75 miles of double track, on the broad gauge, using Brunel's longitudinal timber track. Engines and rolling stock were provided by the Great Western Railway; they arrived by coastal shipping, as the line was not connected to any other line. Soon after the opening a slip in the deep cutting slope took place at Llansamlet, between Neath and Swansea. To stabilise it, Brunel erected the so-called flying arches, loaded with slag, to resist the thrust.

Brunel's most substantial timber work, not just on the SWR, but as far as his work was concerned for any railway company, was to be found in the vicinity of Swansea. Crossing the River Tawe and the Landore marshes, the Landore viaduct formed a continuous timber work, exactly one-third of a mile long, with thirty-seven spans ranging from 40 to 100 feet.

Construction was of course proceeding on the section between Landore and Haverfordwest, and between Chepstow and Grange Court. In November 1850, the work on the line towards Fishguard (west of the point of junction for the Haverfordwest branch) was resumed; it had been suspended since the autumn of 1848. The instruction to complete the line may have been in frustration at the GWR position on the lease agreement. Further negotiation took place and the agreement in March 1851 took the form that the GWR would lease the line for 999 years from the time of completion from Grange Court to Swansea. The GWR were to take one third of the net profit, but pay a rental on the line; the SWR would provide the staffing other than the locomotive department. The work of completing the western extremity of the line was again discontinued.

=== Gloucester to Chepstow ===
Completion of the Chepstow bridge was much delayed, while the easier construction between its east side and Grange Court was proceeding well. Construction of the Gloucester and Forest of Dean Railway was also going well, although the opening bridge over the Severn at Gloucester, and the junction arrangements with the GWR at Gloucester station were causing delay.

However the line was opened on 19 September 1851 from Gloucester to a temporary station named Chepstow East, at Sedbury Lane. Passengers (only) were conveyed by omnibus between the two Chepstow stations.

On 19 July 1852 a single line over the Chepstow bridge was brought into use, and through communication from London to Swansea was available. The 999-year lease by the GWR started. The second track over the bridge was in use from 18 April 1853.

The Chepstow railway bridge over the Wye had finally been completed: it had been a severe engineering challenge. The 300 feet main spans were suspended from chains, with an overhead tubular strut of 9 feet diameter to resist the inward force of the chains. Some commentators suggest that this arrangement was a preliminary to the Royal Albert Bridge at Saltash.

In sinking the cylinders to form the piers of the bridge, the workmen had first to pass through 29 feet of blue clay and sand, below which they met with a thin bed of peat containing timber, some solid oak, hazel-nuts, and other similar substances... The cylinders were placed on planks to prevent their cutting into the soft mud. One by one the cylinders were added until they had reached the top of the stage (about 100 feet in height) which had been erected for the purpose of sinking them. The weight of the column now cut through the planks, and the cylinder sank about 6 feet.

The approach spans were replaced in 1948 and the main spans were reconstructed using a warren truss configuration in 1962.

=== Landore westward ===
The westward route from Landore to Carmarthen was opened on 11 October 1852. It was laid as a single line using Barlow rails for economy. Two lines of the Llanelly Railway were crossed on the level, as were other horse-operated mineral lines.

In 1828 the Llanelly Railroad and Dock Company built a dock and a two-mile railway connecting coal pits north of Llanelly, and in 1839 a second line from Llanelly to Cwmamman was opened. At first concentrating on mineral traffic, the railway was very successful.

The intended route of the South Wales Railway needed to cross the two lines of the Llanelly Railroad and Dock Company, and the South Wales Railway Act 1845 (8 & 9 Vict. c. cxc) did not specify in detail how this was to be done. The Llanelly company wished to sell its network to the South Wales Railway, and suggested that the crossing would make its system unworkable: it demanded that the SWR pay compensation equivalent to a purchase.

The SWR declined and the issue dragged on for a considerable time; the Llanelly Railway obstructed the SWR construction as much as possible, and at one stage the SWR considered crossing by a viaduct. Eventually however the SWR opened its line, crossing the Llanelly lines by flat crossings, and the matter was put to rest.

In June 1852 a connection was made from Swansea station to the North Dock at Swansea. (Note: The North Dock was on the west side of the River Tawe.)

South Wales Railway Act 1852
- Act of Parliament
- Parliament of the United Kingdom
- Long title: An Act to enable the South Wales Railway Company to construct new Railways to Milford Haven and at Newport, and to abandon Portions of the Lines from Fishguard and at Haverfordwest; and for other Purposes.
- Citation: 15 & 16 Vict. c. cxvii

Dates
- Royal assent: 17 June 1852
Other legislation
Repealed by	South Wales Railway Consolidation Act 1855

Status: Repealed

Text of statute as originally enacted

South Wales Railway Consolidation Act 1855
- Act of Parliament
- Parliament of the United Kingdom
- Long title: An Act to consolidate and amend the Acts relating to the South Wales Railway Company, and to authorize the Construction of new Works, and Alterations of existing Works, and for other Purposes.
- Citation: 18 & 19 Vict. c. xcviii

Dates
- Royal assent: 26 June 1855

Text of statute as originally enacted

The definite decision was taken not to proceed to Fishguard, and an act of Parliament, the South Wales Railway Act 1852 (15 & 16 Vict. c. cxvii), was obtained authorising abandonment of the Fishguard line and instead an extension from Haverfordwest to Neyland Point, on the Milford Haven Waterway. (Note: Milford Haven here refers to the body of water.)

The lease arrangement with the Great Western Railway again became a source of conflict, leading to an arbitration award largely in favour of the GWR. At length the SWR gave notice to terminate the arrangement, on 30 June 1857. Even after the termination, trailing disputes continued to arise leading to further arbitration. MacDermot states that The disputes were, however, always conducted in a more or less friendly fashion, and the two Companies never became really hostile to each other.

The line was extended from Carmarthen to Haverfordwest on 2 January 1854, again a single line formed of Barlow rails.

== Adjacent railways ==
At first the South Wales Railway line made no junction connections with other railways except with the Gloucester and Forest of Dean Railway at Grange Court; notwithstanding its name, that railway simply provided the link between Gloucester and the north-eastern extremity of the South Wales Railway. At first there were no other broad gauge lines in the area traversed by the SWR.

Some railways were already in existence and their routes were crossed by the SWR:

At Bullo Pill there was an old but active tramway known first as the Bullo Pill Railway, from 1826 as the Forest of Dean Railway, and after lengthy negotiations the SWR was able to purchase it in September 1850. A connection was made soon after the opening of the main line, and work started on converting it to a broad gauge railway. The small network, which became known as the Forest of Dean branch, was ready for mineral traffic on 24 July 1854.

At Lydney the Severn and Wye Railway, a 3 ft 6in gauge horse-operated line dating from about 1813, crossed the path of the SWR on the level. The SWR agreed to pay the S&WR £15,000 to be spent on upgrading their line for broad gauge vehicles. The S&WR dragged their feet, but in 1857 they put the work in hand. Their line continued to be worked by horses alone.

At Newport a short junction branch to exchange sidings with the narrow gauge Monmouthshire Railway western valley was installed.

The Taff Vale Railway had been opened between Cardiff and Merthyr in 1840 and 1841, and the company went on to expand its network considerably. It extended south from its Cardiff terminus to the Bute West Dock in Cardiff in 1848, so that the South Wales Railway needed to cross it.

Although engineered by Brunel, the Taff Vale Railway was a narrow (standard) gauge line. In 1851 the South Wales Railway applied for powers to make a junction with the Taff Vale Railway at Bute Street, Cardiff, hoping that the Taff Vale would install broad gauge, to avoid the transshipment of minerals at the break of gauge. This the Taff Vale declined to do, and instead the SWR itself laid narrow gauge track into its own Cardiff station; this was ready in January 1854 and sanctioned for passenger train use in February 1854.

The horse-worked Llynvi Valley Railway brought minerals to a transfer station at Stormy, just east of Pyle.

The Swansea Vale Railway which had long been established as a waggonway, crossed the SWR main line by a flat crossing near Llansamlet. Steps were taken to abolish the dangerous crossing, forming a proper junction instead, and broad gauge rails were laid on the Swansea Vale between the point of junction and the SVR sidings at North Dock, Swansea. This work was completed in February 1857; there had been a serious collision in the previous October at the old crossing.

The Llanelly Railway routes were crossed on the level by the South Wales Railway; apparatus was installed at Llanelly for the transfer of minerals from narrow gauge Llanelly wagons to broad gauge SWR wagons.

== SWR branches not built ==
The SWR had intended two branches of its own. That from Newport to Monmouth was in truth a concession to vocal interests in Monmouth. When it became apparent that the Monmouth and Hereford Railway was not to be constructed, the SWR dropped the branch.

The other branch was to have connected to Pembroke. When the SWR decided to make their western terminus at Neyland instead of Fishguard, the Pembroke branch was going to be an expensive luxury, as Neyland was only a five-minute ferry crossing away. The company hoped to forget the Pembroke branch, but vociferous local opinion pressed the legal obligation of the company to complete its authorised lines, and in default of the legal obligation the company was forced to suspend its second-half dividend in 1857.

== Completion to Neyland, and some branches ==
On 15 April 1856 the line was extended from Haverfordwest to Neyland. The Barlow rail track installed on the earlier western sections was now found to be unsatisfactory, and this new section was made with ordinary longitudinal timber track. The Barlow track was progressively relaid over the following years.

The line between Carmarthen and Neyland was doubled from 1 July 1857.

A short extension to the Bute docks at Cardiff was opened on 19 April 1858, and an extension of the Swansea coal branch to connect with the harbour railway was opened in September 1859.

== Independent broad gauge railways ==
Four independent railways made broad gauge connections with the South Wales Railway during the time of its independent existence.

The most important was the Vale of Neath Railway. It was incorporated in 1846 to make a line from Neath to Merthyr Tydvil, with a branch from near Hirwaun to Aberdare. As a broad gauge line serving a mineral district it was obviously to be a useful feeder to the South Wales Railway, and when it was unable to secure the subscriptions it needed to build its line, the South Wales Railway subscribed £127,780.

The shortage of capital caused the directors to prioritise the Aberdare route, which opened from Neath on 24 September 1851 for passenger traffic, goods and minerals following in December. The Vale of Neath Railway was the biggest contributor of mineral traffic to the South Wales Railway, but most of that was destined for Swansea docks, so that no long haul income was derived from the connection. (In fact for many years a single daily mineral train to London was adequate for all the South Wales Railway's traffic.)

The South Wales Mineral Railway built a line of about 12 miles from Briton Ferry to Glyncorrwg, opening from 1860.

The Carmarthen and Cardigan Railway opened part of its line, from the SWR Carmarthen station to their own Carmarthen station; the SWR Station was renamed Carmarthen Junction on the same day, 1 July 1860.

The Llynvi Valley Railway had been a tramway; the company obtained power to convert to a broad gauge railway at Bridgend, and in August 1861 opened the improved line form mineral traffic.

The Ely Valley Railway opened a mineral line from Llantrisant to Tonyrefail in August 1860.

The Neyland terminal was at a remote location, and the nearby settlement named Milford was significant, and local interests promoted a railway as a branch of the SWR, from Johnston. The Milford Railway was incorporated on 5 June 1856, and the independent company constructed the line. The Great Western Railway, which was working the South Wales Railway, worked the Milford branch from its opening on 7 September 1863 (actually after amalgamation of the SWR and the GWR). The Milford terminus became better known as Milford Haven, and continues at the present day.

== Relations with the Great Western Railway ==
The working arrangement with the Great Western Railway continued to be a source of friction, and at the half yearly meeting of the SWR in February 1860, a letter from the auditors to the directors was read to the meeting:

Gentlemen: We think it our duty to call your serious attention to the very unsatisfactory condition of the accounts between the South Wales and Great Western Railway companies. Your auditors have understood that from time to time attempts have been made to adjust the many items involving large sums in difference between the two companies, but we now conclude they have proved abortive, as… other questions have recently arisen which have so largely added to the disputed amounts as to render any division of profits in our judgment of doubtful prudence.

We, therefore, strongly recommend that the agreement between the two companies should be cancelled, and that the South Wales Railway should be worked independently and separately.

— Cardiff and Merthyr Guardian

A motion was put to the meeting, that the "lease is injurious to both companies, and that it is desirable to put an end to it".

The directors had no immediate means of putting an end to it, and in the following months further sources of conflict arose. Eventually the board submitted a bill in Parliament for the 1861 session to create more capital to purchase rolling stock, and to work the line itself. This was received favourably in Parliament, but it was evident that there was not time to get the bill passed in that session, and it was withdrawn. The GWR, sensing Parliament's view of the lease proposed instead an amalgamation of the two companies.

Great Western Railway (South Wales Amalgamation) Act 1863
- Act of Parliament
- Parliament of the United Kingdom
- Long title: An Act for the Amalgamation of the South Wales Railway Company with the Great Western and West Midland Railway Companies; and for other Purposes.
- Citation: 26 & 27 Vict. c. cxcviii

Dates
- Royal assent: 21 July 1863

Text of statute as originally enacted

This negotiation too was difficult, but agreement was reached on 15 November 1861, so that from 1 January 1862 the GWR would take a lease of the SWR until the amalgamation of the GWR and the West Midland Railway, then in process, was finalised. After amalgamation the SWR was to receive 10.7% rising to 10.9% of the combined receipts of the GWR, WMR and SWR. The amalgamation was sanctioned by an act of Parliament, the Great Western Railway (South Wales Amalgamation) Act 1863 (26 & 27 Vict. c. cxcviii) of 21 July 1863, and it took effect on 1 August 1863.

== Part of the Great Western Railway ==
From 1 August 1863 the South Wales Railway network was formally part of the Great Western Railway. The continuous route from Paddington (London) to Neyland was 285 1/4 miles of which 164 had been built by the South Wales Railway. The Gloucester to Grange Court section had always been worked with the SWR and now ceased to have a separate existence.

Although successful, the line had not fulfilled its potential: the hoped-for heavy mineral traffic from South Wales was in fact largely conveyed by coastal shipping, and the transatlantic passenger business had not materialised at all. The opening up of deep coal seams in the central part of the South Wales Coalfield from about 1850 had encouraged deep-sea (that is, overseas) export rather than domestic trade.

== Bristol and South Wales Union Railway ==
From the outset, it was obvious that the considerable intercourse between Bristol and South Wales needed better facilities, and any railway journey via Gloucester hardly answered the need. Ferry crossings of the Severn were already commonplace, and a railway from Bristol to New Passage Pier was promoted. This became the Bristol and South Wales Union Railway, opened on 8 September 1863. It was worked by the GWR; a short branch on the western shore to Portskewett Pier was opened at the same time.

== Gauge conversion ==
When conceived as a prime trunk line, the broad gauge had seemed a superior technical solution, but as time passed, the practical difficulty of the break of gauge with neighbouring lines assumed an ever-greater significance.

Moreover, the supremacy of the former SWR line in West Wales was beginning to be eroded; the Pembroke and Tenby Railway, a narrow gauge line, had aligned itself with other such lines at Carmarthen and had obtained the Pembroke and Tenby Railway (Extension) Act 1864 (27 & 28 Vict. c.clxxxiii) for an independent line from Whitland to Carmarthen; the GWR saw that this could lead to a hostile railway, probably the London and North Western Railway, establishing control of these lines and the GWR agreed to lay standard gauge track on its own route between Whitland and Carmarthen to accommodate the P&TR trains. It did so by altering one line of the broad gauge double line to narrow (standard) gauge. This was ready on 1 June 1868. The conversion was the first instance of GWR broad gauge track being altered to narrow gauge.

Finally in 1871 the GWR took the decision to convert the gauge of all its broad gauge track from Swindon through Gloucester to west Wales, including all branches; some mixed gauge sections were converted to narrow-only in addition. The work was executed in April 1872 in a massive operation. On the night of Tuesday 30 April the up line from New Milford and Grange Court was closed, and single-line working of a reduced train service instituted on the down line. Considerable technical preparation had been made including oiling and freeing of the bolts; much of the track was the GWR pattern longitudinal timber track, but some Barlow rail sections had been replaced with rails on cross sleepers, and because of the use of fang bolts this was much more laborious to convert.

The up line was ready for standard gauge traffic on 12 May and all broad gauge rolling stock was cleared from the Welsh lines; this included the Carmarthen and Cardigan Railway, and an inspector was sent to verify that this had been done. The reduced train service was operated over the single up line, and sidings at certain station had been previously narrowed to allow passenger trains to be shunted to pass opposing trains, as there was no ordinary crossing loop for a few days. During this time goods trains were not run on the line under conversion, but as far as possible goods traffic was worked by alternative routes where they were available east of Swansea

Conversion of the down line was complete on 22 May and the following day a skeleton service was run at reduced speed. Private owners' broad gauge wagons were returned to their home station; in many cases there was not enough siding accommodation for them, and they were turned off the line as close to their home station as possible.

== From 1873 to 1923 ==
=== Mineral and other traffic development ===
The gauge conversion immediately rendered the neighbouring independent railways more accessible as the break of gauge had been done away with. The development of industry in South Wales provided a considerable spur to the mineral traffic on the SWR route. The development was by no means confined to the collieries in the South Wales Valleys. Iron, and later steel, industries became important, at first largely concentrated on extractive processes but soon followed by intermediate and finishing industries; tinplate came to have especial importance. Copper smelting developed a massive importance, centred on Swansea.

General commercial social development fed a demand for ordinary passenger and goods traffic, and some coastal towns became important as holiday resorts in the last quarter of the 19th century.

Nonetheless, many independent railway companies saw the GWR as a difficult partner, and the use of coastal shipping for mineral transport remained high.

=== Severn Tunnel ===
The route from London and Bristol to the former South Wales Railway system lay through Gloucester, and the GWR had long suffered from the epithet "the Great Way Round". The Bristol and South Wales Union Railway provided a rail and ferry connection, but this was not capable of handling bulk minerals, and there was soon a move to cross under the Severn.

The tunnel when completed was 4 miles 624 yards (7,008 m) in length; it was the longest tunnel in the United Kingdom until 2007, and the longest underwater tunnel in the world until 1987.

The line was opened on 1 September 1886, although passenger trains were not run until 1 December 1886.

=== Swansea west loop ===
When the South Wales Railway was constructed, Swansea was placed on a branch line from the through route to Carmarthen; the junction point was at Landore. Traffic west from Swansea was required to reverse and this situation was not improved until 1907 when the Swansea Loop was provided, forming a south to west chord on the triangle.

Swansea High Street station was built originally as a two-platform wooden structure. It was enlarged in 1879, but although the opening of the Swansea West Loop in 1906 allowed through working between High Street and Carmarthen, it was not until after the High Street station was completely modernised during 1923–32, that the station became adequate for the increase in traffic and longer trains. The Landore Viaduct is a prominent landmark.

MacDermot refers to the line as Swansea, Landore West Loop, and gives opening dates as 5 March 1906, passengers 1 May 1906.

=== Fishguard ===
The original aspiration of the South Wales Railway, to reach Fishguard, was finally achieved when on 30 August 1906 a new route was opened from Clarbeston Road to Fishguard Harbour, partly using a local railway route. A ferry service between Fishguard Harbour and Rosslare was started at the same time. The construction had been prodigiously expensive as much of the station and sidings area at Fishguard had to be blasted out of rock cliffs.

Transatlantic traffic was the prize still sought after, and the RMS Mauretania called at Fishguard on 25 August 1909. Transatlantic steamers continued to call on a sporadic basis, but the outbreak of World War I resulted in suspension of the trade after the call of the RMS Lusitania on 14 September 1914, and it was never resumed. The Irish ferry trade continued after the war and is still in use at the present day.

== 1923 to 1947 ==
The railways of Great Britain were "grouped" under the terms of the Railways Act 1921, effective from 1 January 1923 (although some effective dates were shortly before or after that date). The pre-1923 Great Western Railway, the Taff Vale Railway, the Rhymney Railway, the Alexandra (Newport & South Wales) Docks & Railway, the Barry Railway, the Cambrian Railways and the Cardiff Railway were constituents of the post-1923 Great Western Railway. Most other lines in South Wales and Gloucestershire west of the River Severn were "subsidiaries" of the Great Western Railway, although some lines that had become owned by the Midland Railway and the London and North Western Railway became part of the new London, Midland and Scottish Railway.

The combined Great Western Railway brought most of the branch lines under GWR control, and enabled efficiencies of scale to be introduced in time. The GWR had long been accused of exploiting its near-monopoly of long-distance rail connection, and the grouping enhanced that hostility:

In South Wales some of the troubles that were to beset the railways were attributed to the Great Western "takeover". It was necessary more than once, to remind business interests, and other people in South Wales, that the amalgamations of 1922 were no result of Great Western aggrandisement. The grouping was imposed by law...

The size of the enlarged company may be judged from the fact that the GWR was responsible for 11% of the local rates of Cardiff in 1924.

The South Wales Railway route now assumed its destiny as the spine of the GWR system, with the former independent railways forming branches off it.

The Development (Loan Guarantees and Grants) Act 1929 (20 & 21 Geo. 5. c. 7) was passed to encourage capital works by the railways and other industries, with the aim of reducing unemployment. The Great Western Railway took advantage of the government assistance, in improving and extending the goods marshalling facilities at Severn Tunnel Junction, and in modernisation and improvements at Cardiff General and Swansea High Street stations. A major power signalling system was installed at Cardiff, and some rationalisation of the duplicate routes at Briton Ferry and Court Sart, a legacy of the Rhondda and Swansea Bay Railway, were undertaken. All this work was done in the period 1930 to 1934.

== Nationalisation and later ==
The main line railways of Great Britain were taken into national ownership, under British Railways, at the beginning of 1948; the Great Western Railway ceased to exist.

Steel manufacture was also undergoing major change, and part of that process resulted in the opening of a major steelworks at Port Talbot in 1951. This was followed by the establishment of a further major integrated steelworks at Llanwern, between Newport and Severn Tunnel Junction.

Margam marshalling yard was completed in 1960, rationalising goods and mineral routing in the area.

A branch line to the new Gulf Oil refinery at Waterston, near Milford Haven, was opened on 21 August 1960; it made a junction at Herbrandston Junction. The location was chosen because of the availability of deep water berthing for very large oil tanker ships; a further branch was opened to a new Amoco refinery at Robeston on 20 February 1974.

Neyland had lost its significance as a ferry terminal when Fishguard was started in 1906, but the extensive carriage servicing and locomotive depot and traincrew establishment there caused it to remain an important terminal for many decades. Finally however rationalisation, chiefly spurred by the introduction of diesel multiple units and the consequent changed pattern of rolling stock servicing, resulted in the closure of the line from Johnston to Neyland on 14 June 1964.

== Recent times ==
The majority of the original South Wales Railway main line is in use between Gloucester and Milford Haven. From Severn Tunnel Junction to Swansea is part of the South Wales Main Line, forming part of the London to Swansea section. A significant passenger service operates between Gloucester and Severn Tunnel Junction, and west of Swansea. Milford Haven and Fishguard form the western extremities of the line, the original Neyland section having closed.

== Station reopening ==
Most of the stations that have been reopened in the time of British Rail under the Regional Railways sector. The stations reopened being: as part of the Maesteg Line reopening (Mid Glamorgan council and British Rail), Pontyclun and Pencoed in 1992; under the Swanline (West Glamorgan and Mid Glamorgan councils as well as British Rail) Pyle in 1994 and along with Briton Ferry, Skewen and Llansamlet. Then following the break up of British Rail, Railtrack installed a new station on the Swanline in Baglan in 1996. Under Network Rail and the Welsh Assembly Government a reopened Llanharan and was funded in part by SEWTA and at a cost of £4.3 million, in 2007.

== Station list ==
List of stations during the independent existence of the South Wales Railway (until 1 August 1863).

Station	Opened	Notes
Gloucester GWR station	19 September 1851	
Grange Court	1 June 1855	
Newnham	19 September 1851	
Awre for Blakeney	19 December 1851	
Gatcombe	1 August 1852	
Lydney	19 September 1851	
Woolaston	1 June 1853	
Chepstow East	19 September 1851	
Chepstow	19 June 1850	
Portskewett	19 June 1850	
Magor	1 October 1851	
Llanwern	1 October 1855	
Newport	19 June 1850	
Marshfield	2 September 1852	
Cardiff	19 June 1850	
Ely	2 September 1852	
St Fagans	1 April 1852	
Peterston	1 September 1858	
Llantrisant	19 June 1850	
Pencoed	2 September 1850	
Bridgend	19 June 1850	
Pyle	19 June 1850	
Port Talbot	19 June 1850	
Briton Ferry	2 September 1850	
Neath	14 October	
Llansamlet	1 April 1852	
Landore	19 June 1850	
Swansea	19 June 1850	
Gower Road	1 August 1854	
Llanelli	11 October 1852	
Pembrey & Burry Port	11 October 1852	
Kidwelly	11 October 1852	
Ferryside	11 October 1852	
Carmarthen	11 October 1852	renamed Carmarthen Junction in 1860
St Clears	2 January 1854	
Whitland	2 January 1854	
Narberth Road	2 January 1854	
Clarbeston Road	2 January 1854	
Haverfordwest	2 January 1854	
Johnston	15 April 1856	
Milford Haven	15 April 1856	Renamed Neyland in 1859, then renamed New Milford later in 1859; later Neyland; note that this is not the later Milford Haven station.
