= Swansea Bay and West Wales Metro =

Transport project in Wales

- Transport for Wales, the national transport authority

- The focus area of the project

Overview
- Owner: Transport for Wales (proposed)
- Area served: South West Wales; (Swansea Bay City Region); Carmarthenshire; Neath Port Talbot; Pembrokeshire; Swansea
- Chief executive: James Price
- Website: https://tfw.wales/projects/metro/swansea-bay-metro

Operation
- Operator: Transport for Wales

The Swansea Bay and West Wales Metro, or simply the Swansea Bay Metro (Welsh: Metro Bae Abertawe; originally proposed as the South West Wales Metro) is a proposed enhancement of railways, buses and active travel around the Swansea Bay and South West Wales (or just West Wales) areas of South Wales. The project could take up to 10 years to complete.

Welsh Government video, 2021: consultation on the proposed line

The proposal would see a new line from Baglan to Swansea station via Swansea Bay, which would allow a 30-minute service between Cardiff and Swansea following the scrapping of plans for electrification between the two cities in July 2017. The project is estimated to cost £1 billion. The project could see reopening of the Neath Valley line through new stations at Neath Abbey, Jersey Marine, Neath and Aberdulais, an on-street connection from Swansea to Mumbles, and new stations via the existing Swansea to Cardiff route. The project promises better use of existing infrastructure and faster journey times.

A feasibility study was due to start in April 2018.

The proposals include:

- A new line from Baglan to Swansea station, diverting the mainline from the current route via Neath, reducing journey times to 30 minutes
- The new line would have stations at Swansea Bay Campus and SA1
- Reopening of the presently freight-only Neath Valley Line to passengers, with new stations at Jersey Marine, Neath Abbey, Neath (shown as Neath 2) and Aberdulais
- A new line from Neath to Llansamlet Interchange via a new station at Llandarcy
- New stations on the existing Swansea to Baglan line at Llansamlet Interchange, Phoenix and Morfa
- New stations at M4 J45, Morriston, M4 J46 and Pontlliw
- A new station on Station Road in Swansea

Councillors in Neath have expressed resistance to the idea of diverting trains between Cardiff and Swansea away from Neath. Councillor Rob Jones, the leader of Neath Port Talbot council said in 2018:

The Welsh Government has agreed to fund a feasibility study into transport across Swansea Bay which is expected to be submitted next year. We have no difficulty with this exercise, although the high level ideas put forward so far require a great deal more substance. However, I will not support any proposals to take Neath off the main line.

== See also ==
- Transport for Wales
- South West Wales Integrated Transport Consortium
