= Margam Halt railway station =

Disused railway station in Margam, Neath Port Talbot

Margam Halt
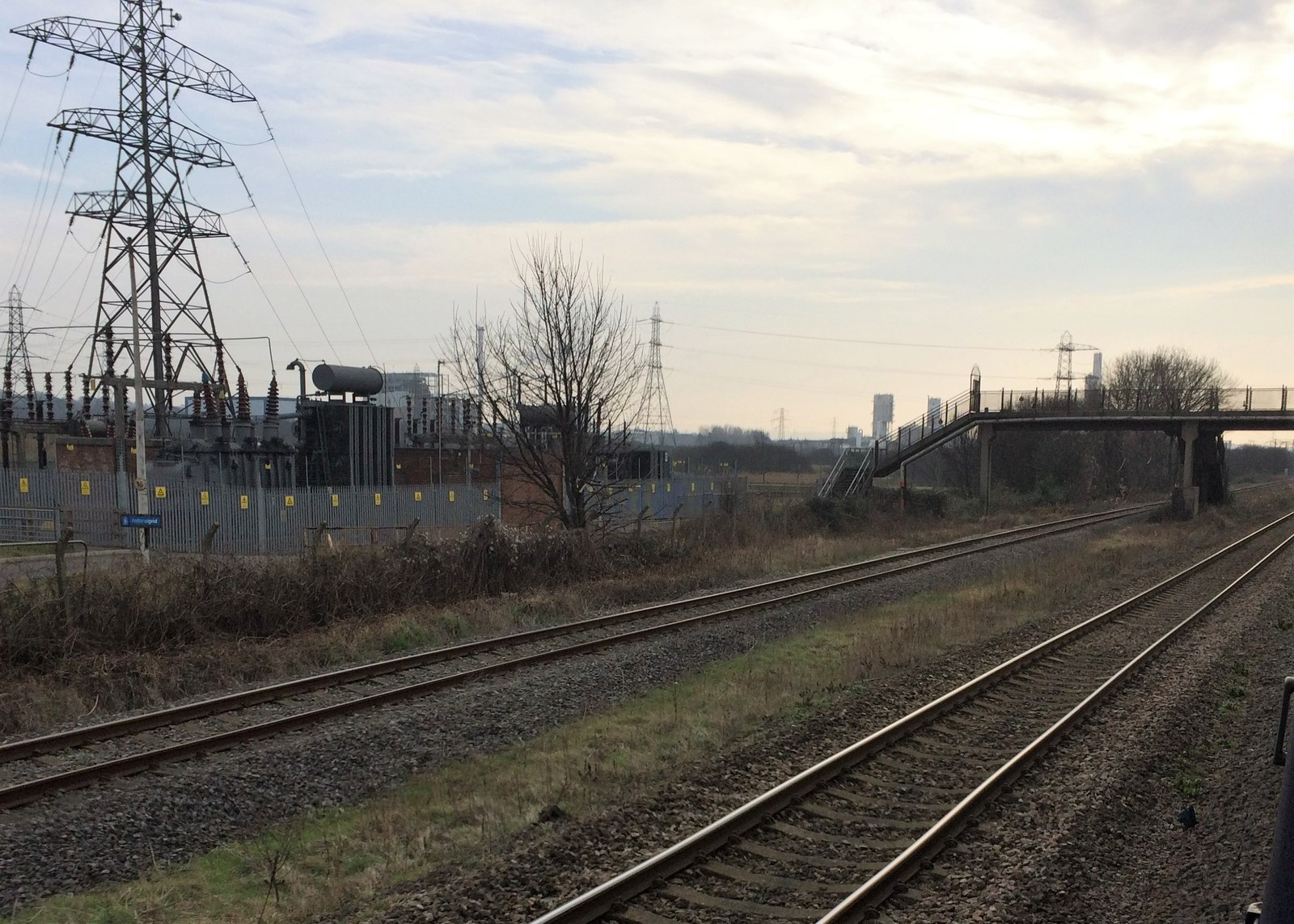
- Station site in 2017

General information
- Location: Margam, Neath Port Talbot; Wales
- Coordinates: 51.5668°N 3.7568°W
- Grid reference: SS783867
- Platforms: 4

Other information
- Status: Disused

History
- Post-grouping: British Railways

Key dates
- 4 February 1948: Opened
- 2 November 1964: Closed
Location

Margam Halt railway station served the steelworks in Margam, Neath Port Talbot, Wales from 1948 to 1964 on the South Wales Main Line.

== History ==
The station opened on 4 February 1948 by British Railways. It closed to both passengers and good traffic on 2 November 1964.

| Preceding station | Historical railways | Following station |
|---|---|---|
| Port Talbot Parkway | Great Western Railway; South Wales Main Line | Baglan |
