= List of venues in Neath Port Talbot =

This pages is a list of venues in Neath Port Talbot county borough.

== Cultural venues ==
=== Performing arts ===
- Afan Lido, Port Talbot
- Glan-yr-Afon Arts Centre, Neath Campus, Neath Port Talbot College Neath
- Gwyn Hall, Neath
- Princess Royal Theatre, Port Talbot
- Pontardawe Arts Centre, Pontardawe
- Neath Little Theatre

== Sporting Venues ==
=== Stadia ===
- The Gnoll, Neath
- Talbot Athletic Ground, Aberavon RFC, Port Talbot
- Victoria Road, Port Talbot Town FC
- Runtech Stadium, Afan Lido FC
- Aberavon Quins RFC, Harlequin Road, Port Talbot
- Aberavon Fighting Irish RLFC, Little Warren, Port Talbot
- Walters Arena, Glynneath

=== Mountain biking ===
- Afan Forest Park

=== Golf courses ===
- Glynneath Golf Club, Glynneath
- Lakeside Golf Club, Margam
- Maesteg Golf Course, Maesteg
- Neath Golf Club, Neath
- Pontardawe Golf Club, Pontardawe
- Swansea Bay Golf Club, Crymlyn Burrows

== See also ==
- List of places in Neath Port Talbot - for a list of settlements
- List of places in Neath Port Talbot (categorised)
