= Pyle railway station =

Railway station in Bridgend, Wales

Pyle Welsh: Y Pîl
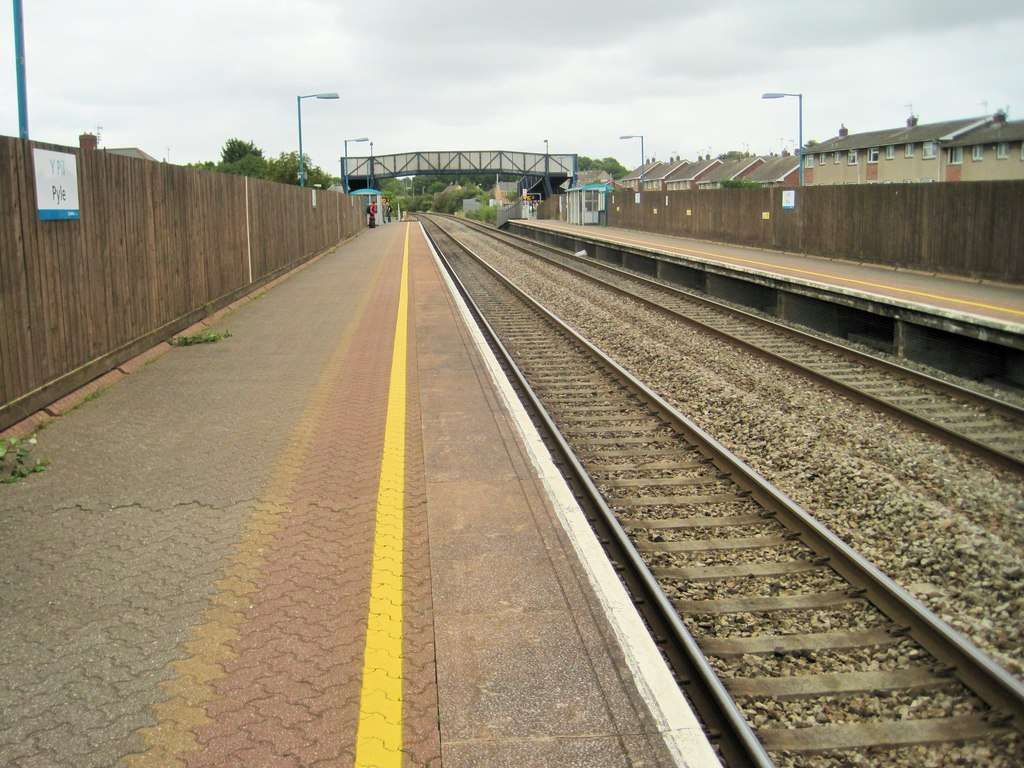

General information
- Location: Pyle, Bridgend; Wales
- Coordinates: 51.526°N 3.698°W
- Grid reference: SS823820
- Managed by: Transport for Wales
- Platforms: 2

Other information
- Station code: PYL
- Classification: DfT category F2

Passengers
- 2020/21: ▼20,920
- 2021/22: ▲64,536
- 2022/23: ▲77,942
- 2023/24: ▲92,652
- 2024/25: ▲0.104 million
Location
Notes
- Passenger statistics from the Office of Rail and Road

Pyle railway station is a minor station in Pyle (Welsh: Y Pîl) in Bridgend county borough, south Wales. The station is located at street level at Beach Road in Pyle, 196 miles 40 chains (316.2 km) from the zero point at London Paddington, measured via Stroud.

== History ==
The original station at Pyle was opened by the South Wales Railway in 1850. It was relocated in 1876 and amalgamated with the former Llynvi and Ogmore Railway station of 1865, which served the branch lines to Tondu and Porthcawl.

In the days of steam Pyle Junction, together with its extensive sidings, was quite an important strategic point on the South Wales railway system, not only for passengers, commuting from or visiting the resort of Porthcawl, but also for freight and bulk traffic, particularly the limestone from local quarries essential for the iron and steel industries. This is evidenced by the fact that during World War II there were two military 'pill-boxes' overlooking its approaches. This station was closed by the Western Region of British Railways in 1964 as part of the notorious Beeching cuts, less than a year after the L&O lines also lost their passenger service (traffic ceased on 9 September 1963, with complete closure following in February 1965).

As part of the Swanline initiative, the present station was opened about 0.5 miles (0.80 km) to the west in June 1994.

For a time under British Rail direct trains ran to London Waterloo, now passengers have to change at Bridgend to reach London Paddington.

== Facilities ==
The station has 2 platforms:

- Platform 1, for westbound trains towards Swansea
- Platform 2, for eastbound trains towards Cardiff Central

The station is unstaffed - there is no ticket office nor are there any platform entry barriers. Passengers must purchase tickets on board trains.

== Services ==
It is a stop on the South Wales Main Line, served by Transport for Wales' Swanline Swansea to Cardiff regional trains. These services are generally every two hours during the day (including Sundays), with additional trains during the morning and evening peaks (some of which continue beyond Swansea onto the West Wales Line).

| Preceding station | National Rail | Following station |
|---|---|---|
| Bridgend | Transport for Wales; Swanline | Port Talbot Parkway |
