= Ely Main Line railway station =

Former railway station in Wales

Ely Main Line

General information
- Location: Ely, Cardiff; Wales
- Coordinates: 51.4853°N 3.2306°W
- Platforms: 2

Other information
- Status: Disused

History
- Original company: South Wales Railway
- Pre-grouping: Great Western Railway
- Post-grouping: Great Western Railway

Key dates
- 2 September 1852: opened
- 1 July 1924: Renamed Ely Main Line
- 10 September 1962: closed to passengers
- 5 August 1963: closed to freight
Location

Ely Main Line railway station served the suburb of Ely, Cardiff until the 1960s.

== History and description ==
The station opened with the opening of the South Wales Railway to serve what was then a growing suburb. In the early 20th Century, over 400,000 tickets were issued each year (due in part to close proximity to the Ely Racecourse), and the station also handled high volumes of freight from the Ely Paper Mills and Creswell's Brewery. After the 1923 grouping of railway companies, the suffix 'Main Line' was added (the Great Western Railway added suffixes to many stations in South Wales at around this time to ease confusion). Despite its earlier popularity, the station's profits slumped in the postwar years. After April 1959, only four trains per day (two in each direction) called at Ely Main Line, and the weekend services were withdrawn.

The station closed in 1962 (before the Beeching Axe) when British Railways discontinued passenger services between Cardiff Clarence Road and Pontypridd via St Fagans on economic grounds. At least two different dates for passenger closure have appeared in print: 10 April 1962, and September 1962.

Freight closure followed in 1963, and the sidings nearby went out of use in 1964.

Preceding station	Historical railways	Following station
Cardiff Central; Line and station open	Great Western Railway; South Wales Railway	St Fagans; Line open, station closed
