= St Fagans railway station =

Former railway station in Wales

St Fagans
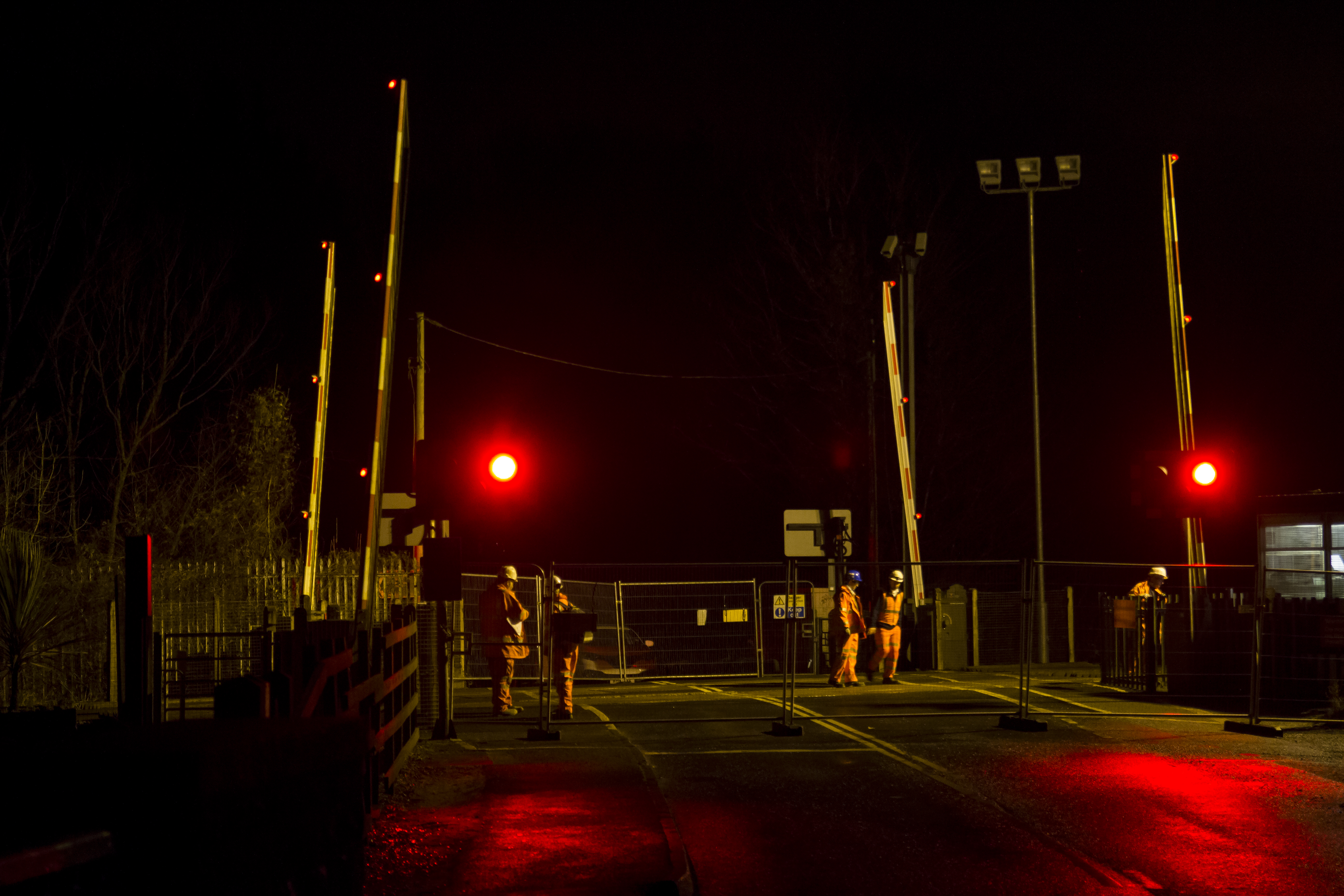
- The level crossing at the site of the station in 2016

General information
- Location: St Fagans, Cardiff; Wales
- Coordinates: 51.4848°N 3.2688°W
- Platforms: 2

Other information
- Status: Disused

History
- Original company: South Wales Railway
- Pre-grouping: Great Western Railway
- Post-grouping: Great Western Railway

Key dates
- 1 April 1852: opened
- 1959: closed to freight
- 10 September 1962: closed to passengers
Location

St Fagans railway station served the village of St Fagans in South Wales. The station was on what is now the South Wales Main Line.

== History ==
Given that it served a rural area, St Fagans was a fairly substantial station, with two long platforms and large station buildings constructed in stone. The station was the nearest to the Wenvoe Iron Mine, which was active from 1859 to 1864 and generated significant freight traffic at St Fagans. A signal box was built in 1889. Initially, the station had no footbridge, and passengers had to cross via a ground-level crossing made from sleepers. A metal footbridge was eventually added in 1931.

== Decline and closure ==
St Fagans, like many stations, fell upon leaner time in the postwar years. The station was destaffed from 6 April 1959, and closed to goods in the same year. For the last few years of passenger operation, only trains between Cardiff Clarence Road and Pontypridd via Creigiau called at the station. When the service was withdrawn in 1962, the station closed. A signal box and a level crossing on the line still remain at St Fagans, but the station itself is long gone.

== New station ==
It has been proposed in recent years for a new station to be built at St Fagans, as bus services from the centre of Cardiff are seen by some as inadequate, and that a new rail connection would greatly improve access to the Museum of Welsh Life. Support for the project was given by former first minister the late Rhodri Morgan.

Preceding station	Historical railways	Following station
Ely Main Line; Line open, station closed	Great Western Railway; South Wales Railway	Peterston; Line open, station closed
