= Port Talbot Parkway railway station =

Railway station in Wales

Port Talbot Parkway Welsh: Parcffordd Port Talbot
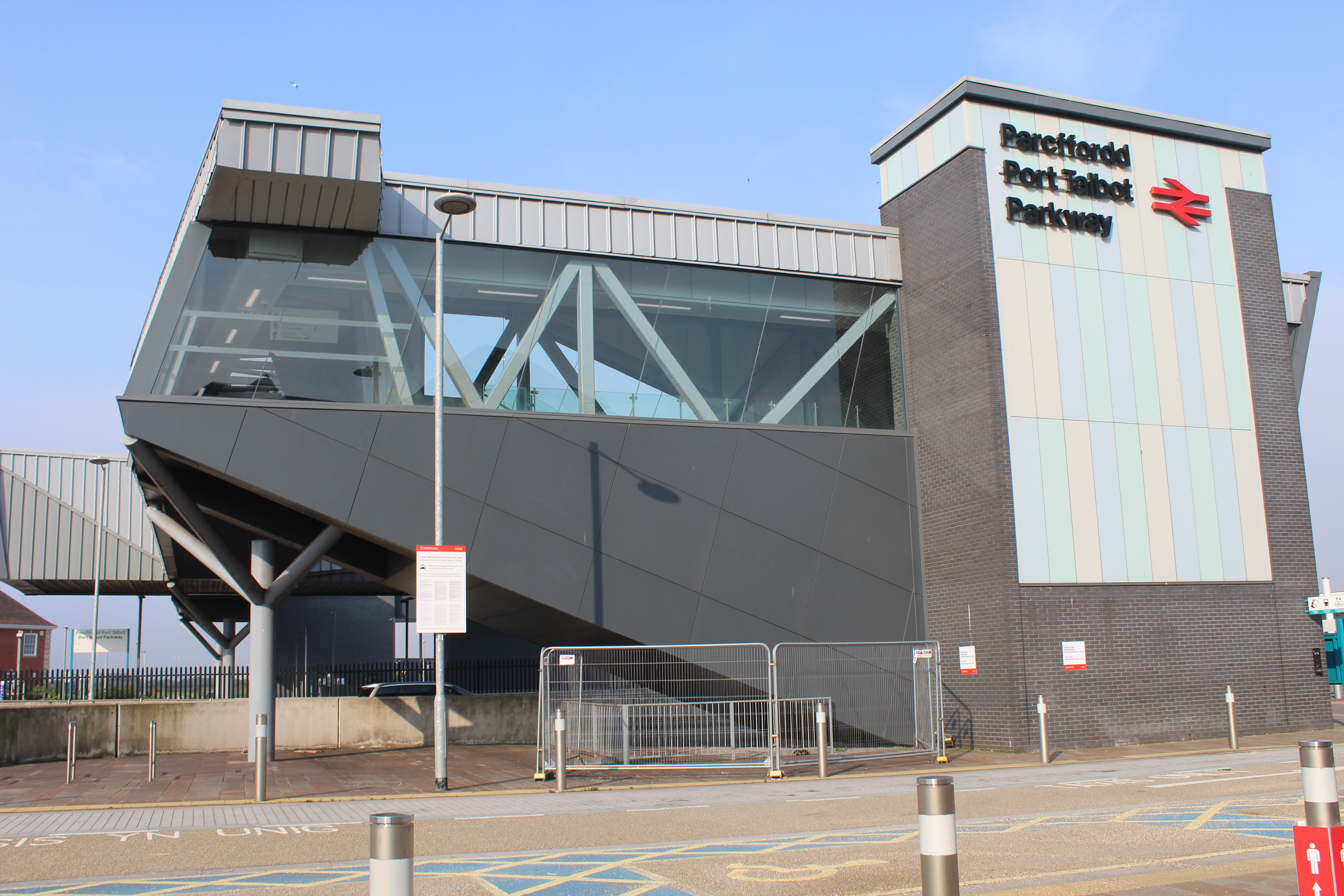

General information
- Location: Port Talbot, Neath Port Talbot; Wales
- Coordinates: 51.592°N 3.781°W
- Grid reference: SS766896
- Manager: Transport for Wales
- Platforms: 2

Other information
- Station code: PTA
- Classification: DfT category D

History
- Original company: South Wales Railway
- Pre-grouping: Great Western Railway
- Post-grouping: Great Western Railway

Key dates
- 19 June 1850: Station opened as Port Talbot
- 5 June 1897: Renamed Port Talbot and Aberavon
- 1 July 1924: Renamed Port Talbot General
- April 1947: Renamed Port Talbot
- 3 December 1984: Renamed Port Talbot Parkway

Passengers
- 2020/21: ▼0.129 million
- 2021/22: ▲0.388 million
- 2022/23: ▲0.472 million
- 2023/24: ▲0.539 million
- 2024/25: ▲0.612 million
Location
Notes
- Passenger statistics from the Office of Rail and Road

Port Talbot Parkway railway station is a railway station in Port Talbot, Wales. The station is located at street level near Station Road in Port Talbot town centre. It is 202 miles 59 chains (326 km) from London Paddington (via Stroud).

== History ==
=== Early history ===
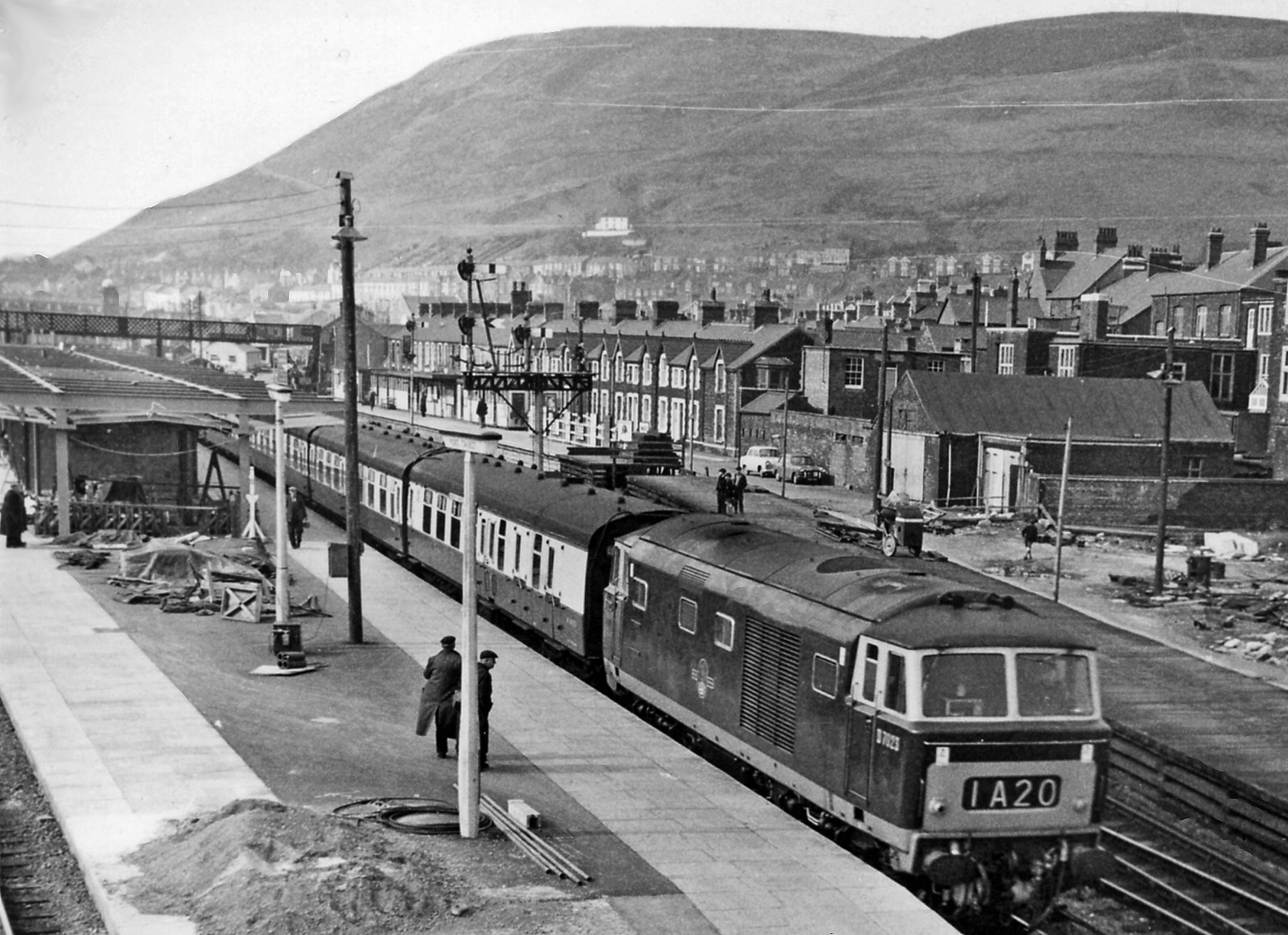
Up Pembroke Coast Express in 1962

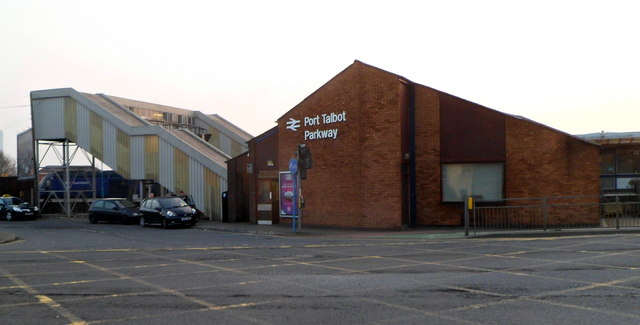
The former station building and footbridge in March 2012

The first section of the South Wales Railway, between Chepstow and Swansea, which included the station originally named Port Talbot, opened either on 18 June 1850, or on 19 June 1850. The station was renamed several times: to Port Talbot and Aberavon on 5 June 1897; to Port Talbot General on 1 July 1924 (the suffix distinguishing it from other stations in Port Talbot), later reverting to the original Port Talbot in April 1947, finally becoming Port Talbot Parkway on 3 December 1984.

While it now bears the title Parkway, it is not a parkway station per se. It was named Parkway in the 1980s by British Rail when the old goods shed and yard were converted to a large car park, with freight handling moved to Margam Knuckle Yard, to encourage patronage of eastbound commuters from the Neath and Swansea Valley areas. The idea was that overall travel time could be saved by catching the train at Port Talbot instead of Neath or Swansea because of the low line speed west of Port Talbot and the limited parking at the other two stations.

There were originally two stations near to the current site, one of which was Aberavon Town, which was on the old Rhondda and Swansea Bay Railway route and the other being the nearby terminus of the Port Talbot Railway named Port Talbot Central.

=== 21st century redevelopment ===
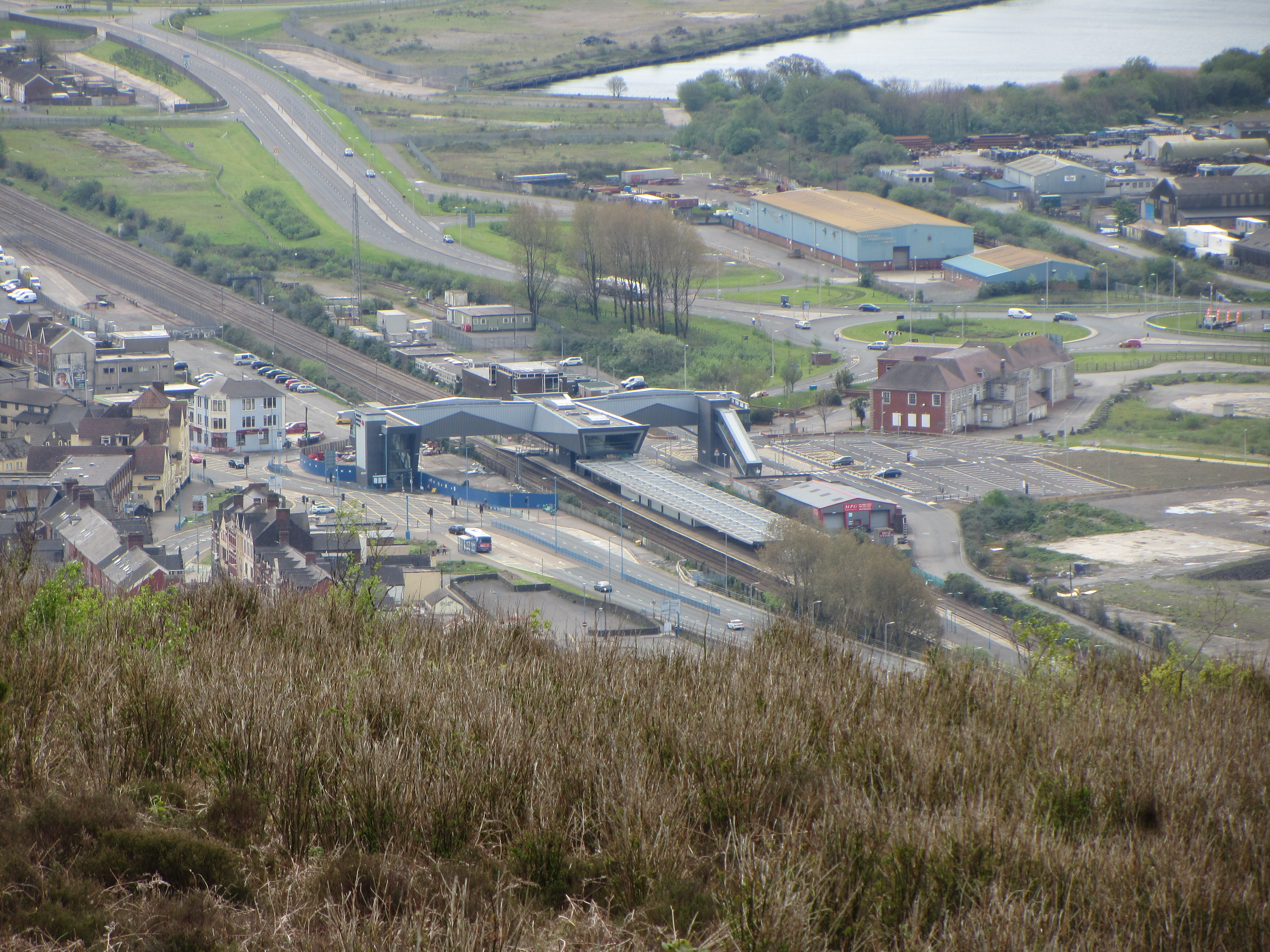
Aerial view of the new footbridge during construction work (May 2016)

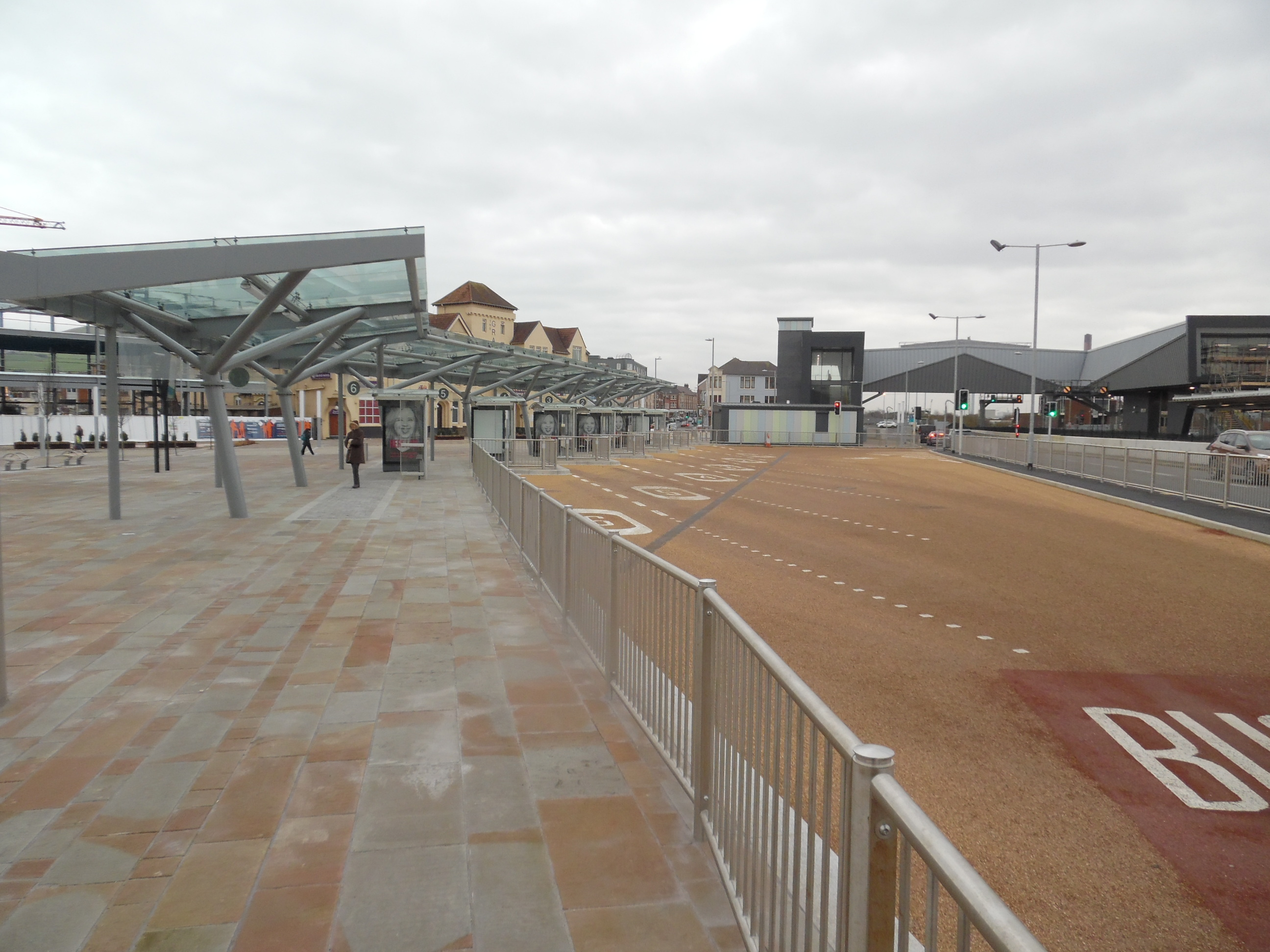
A transport interchange formed part of the redevelopment of the station

Tesco planned to vacate its current store site near the Aberafan Centre and build a new store beside the station featuring a superstore, petrol station and car park. However this was rejected by the local council and the land remains undeveloped.

The resignalling activity in the Port Talbot area during 2006/2007 has provided a new signalled turnback facility in both directions. There are proposals for the present Transport for Wales' Swanline service, which has one train every two hours between Swansea and Cardiff Central, to be altered to a service which terminates at Port Talbot Parkway and operate on an hourly basis between Swansea and Port Talbot Parkway.

The council announced in early 2011 the plans for a new ticket office and platform bridge at the station, including a lift for disabled access and a 200 space car-park.

Redevelopment work on the station began in May 2014 and was completed in late 2016, at a cost of £11 million.

== Facilities ==
The station is of the island type and has 2 platforms:

- Platform 1, for westbound trains towards Swansea and West Wales Line.
- Platform 2, for eastbound trains towards Cardiff Central, Newport, London Paddington and Manchester Piccadilly

The ticket office is open seven days per week, with a self-service ticket machine provided for use and collecting advance purchase tickets. A waiting room and toilets are located on the platform, with the platform and ticket hall linked by a fully accessible footbridge with lifts (installed in 2016). Train running information is offered via CIS displays, automatic announcements and timetable posters.

== Services ==
The station is served by both Great Western Railway main line services between London Paddington and Swansea (hourly each way with peak extras) and Transport for Wales regional trains between Milford Haven/Carmarthen and Manchester Piccadilly via Cardiff Central, Newport and Shrewsbury (also hourly), plus the two-hourly Swansea to Cardiff stopping trains.

On Sundays the London – Swansea Great Western Railway service runs hourly with a two hourly service extended to Carmarthen. Transport for Wales Milford Haven/Carmarthen – Manchester Piccadilly services are hourly .

Preceding station	National Rail	Following station
Pyle	Transport for Wales; Swanline	Baglan
Bridgend	Transport for Wales; Swansea District line	Llanelli
Bridgend	Transport for Wales; South Wales Main Line	Neath
Bridgend	Great Western Railway; London – Swansea	Neath
	Historical railways	
Pyle; Line and station open	Great Western Railway; South Wales Main Line	Margam Halt; Line open, station closed
