= Peterston railway station =

Former railway station in Wales

Peterston

General information
- Location: Peterston-super-Ely, Cardiff; Wales
- Coordinates: 51.4784°N 3.3281°W
- Platforms: 2

Other information
- Status: Disused

History
- Original company: South Wales Railway
- Pre-grouping: Great Western Railway
- Post-grouping: Great Western Railway

Key dates
- September 1858: opened
- 27 June 1962: closed to goods
- 2 November 1964: closed to passengers
Location

Peterston railway station served the village of Peterston-super-Ely in South Wales between 1858 and 1964.

== History and description ==
Peterston first appeared in timetables in 1858. It was then a quiet station, serving a village of just 327 in 1901. In the 1930s, it had 16 employees. Like many other stations in this part of Wales, it saw passenger numbers fall in the postwar years. Peterston was subsequently de-staffed from 6 April 1959, and closed to goods in 1962. After this point, the only passenger trains which stopped there were the 7.00am from Swansea to Weston-super-Mare, and the 5.30pm service from Cardiff to Porthcawl. The station was listed for closure in the Beeching Axe, and the services were withdrawn. Peterston had a goods loop, which closed in 1964.

Preceding station	Historical railways	Following station
St Fagans; Line open, station closed	Great Western Railway; South Wales Railway	Llantrisant; Line & station open
