= Skewen railway station =

Railway station in Neath Port Talbot, Wales

Skewen Welsh: Sgiwen
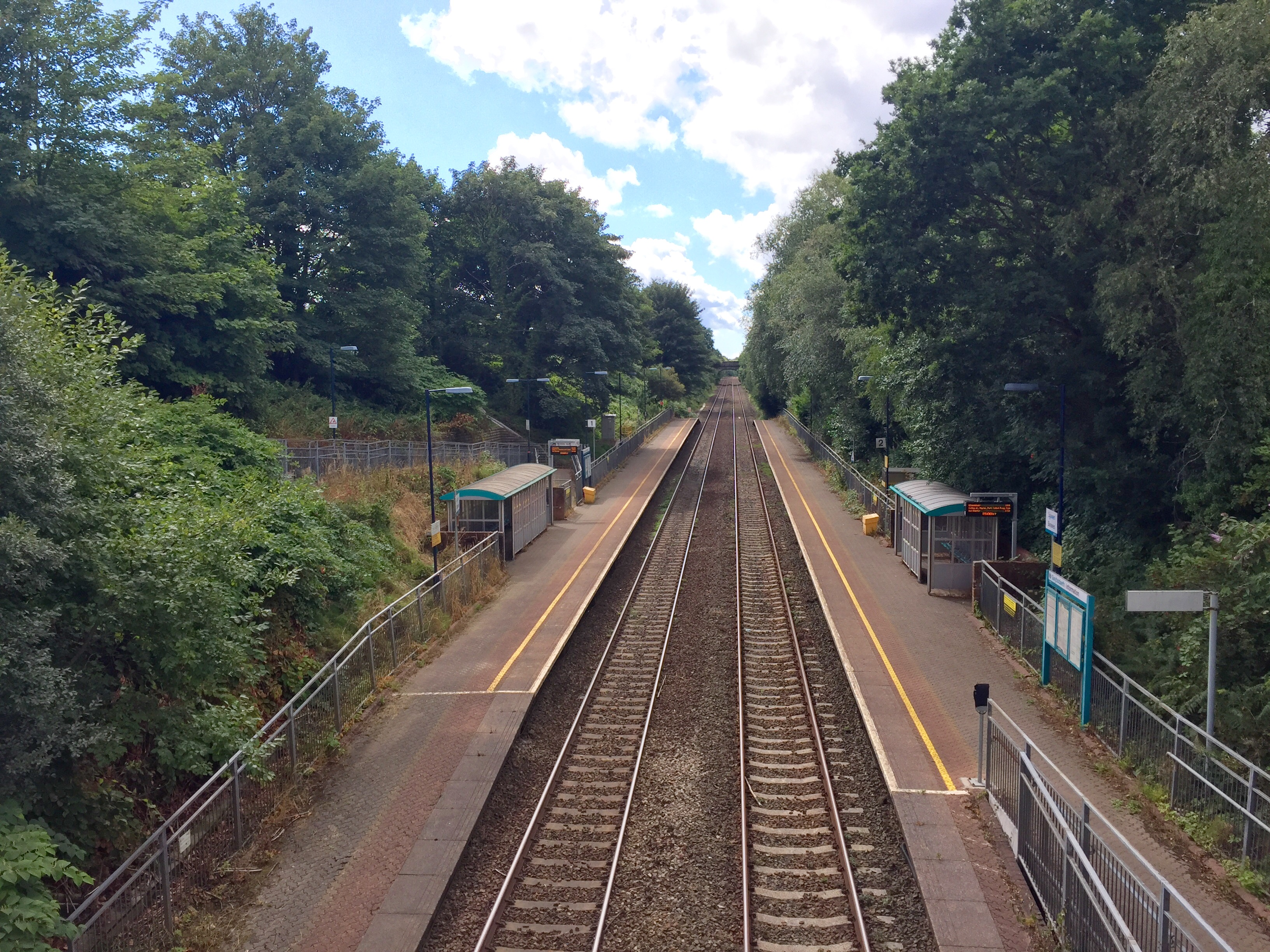

General information
- Location: Skewen, Neath Port Talbot; Wales
- Coordinates: 51.661°N 3.847°W
- Grid reference: SS723974
- Manager: Transport for Wales
- Platforms: 2

Other information
- Station code: SKE
- Classification: DfT category F2

History
- Original company: Great Western Railway
- Pre-grouping: Great Western Railway
- Post-grouping: Great Western Railway

Key dates
- 1882: Opened as Dynevor
- 1904: Renamed Skewen
- 1910: resited
- 2 November 1964: Closed
- 27 June 1994: Reopened as Skewen on different site

Passengers
- 2021/22: ▲23,538
- 2022/23: ▲30,328
- 2023/24: ▲36,008
- 2024/25: ▲43,980
- 2025/26: ▲53,290
Location
Notes
- Passenger statistics from the Office of Rail and Road

Skewen railway station serves the village of Skewen, south Wales. It is located below street level at Station Road in Skewen, 210 miles 26 chains (338 km) from London Paddington (via Stroud). It is a stop on the South Wales Main Line, served by Transport for Wales Swanline regional trains between Swansea and Cardiff, which typically run every two hours. There is no Sunday service.

== Facilities ==
The station has 2 platforms:

- Platform 1, for westbound trains towards Swansea
- Platform 2, for eastbound trains towards Cardiff Central

The station is unstaffed; there is no ticket office or platform barrier. Passengers must buy their tickets from the conductor on the train. Amenities provided include waiting shelters, customer help points, digital CIS displays and timetable poster boards. Step-free access is available on both platforms via ramps from the car park and the road above.

== History ==
The first station here was opened in 1882 by the Great Western Railway as Dynevor and renamed in 1904. It was resited a little to the east in 1910 and closed by the Western Region of British Railways in 1964. The present station was opened to the west as part of the Swanline initiative in 1994.

== Services ==
The typical service pattern is one train approximately every two hours in each direction, with some peak period extras. Trains operate mainly to Cardiff and Swansea, but some westbound services continue to Llanelli, Carmarthen and Milford Haven.

No trains stop here on Sundays. A normal weekday service operates on most bank holidays.

Preceding station	National Rail	Following station
Neath	Transport for Wales; Swanline	Llansamlet
