= List of places in Neath Port Talbot =

Map of places in Neath Port Talbot compiled from this list
See the list of places in Wales for places in other principal areas.

This is a list of cities, towns and villages in the principal area of Neath Port Talbot, Wales. See the list of places in Wales for places in other principal areas.

== A ==
- Aberdulais, Abergwynfi, Alltwen, Aberavon

== B ==
- Baglan, Briton Ferry, Bryn, Bryncoch, Blaengwrach, Blaengwynfi

== C ==
- Cadoxton, Caewern, Coed Darcy, Cwmafan, Crynant, Cymmer, Cilffriw, Cimla, Clyne

== G ==
- Glynneath, Gwaun-Cae-Gurwen, Glyncorrwg

== J ==
Jersey Marine

== L ==
- Llandarcy

== M ==
- Margam

== N ==
- Neath
- Neath Abbey

== O ==
- Onllwyn

== P ==
- Pontardawe, Pontrhydyfen, Port Talbot, Pontneddfechan

== R ==
- Resolven, Rhos

== S ==
- Seven Sisters, Skewen, Sandfields

== T ==
- Tonna, Taibach

== Y ==
- Ystalyfera

== See also ==
- List of places in Neath Port Talbot (categorised)
