= Llansamlet railway station =

Railway station in Swansea, Wales

Llansamlet
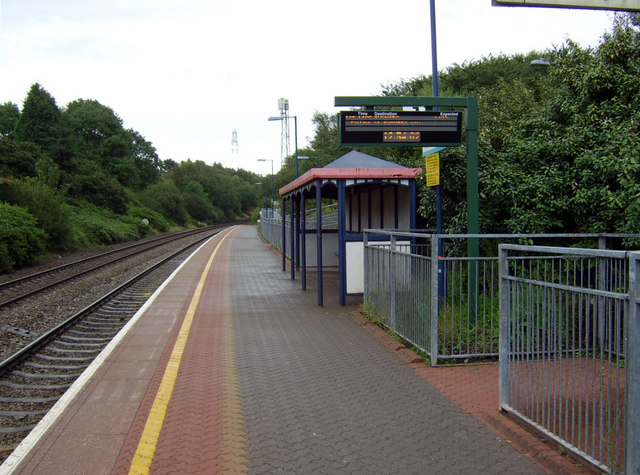
- The westbound platform for trains to Swansea at Llansamlet

General information
- Location: Llansamlet, Swansea; Wales
- Coordinates: 51.6615°N 3.8848°W
- Grid reference: SS697975
- Manager: Transport for Wales
- Platforms: 2

Other information
- Station code: LAS
- Classification: DfT category F2

History
- Original company: Great Western Railway
- Pre-grouping: Great Western Railway
- Post-grouping: Great Western Railway

Key dates
- 1 January 1885: Station opened as Llansamlet
- February 1950: Renamed Llansamlet North
- 2 November 1964: Station closed
- 27 June 1994: New station opened as Llansamlet on different site

Passengers
- 2021/22: ▲20,542
- 2022/23: ▲22,410
- 2023/24: ▲26,598
- 2024/25: ▲38,484
- 2025/26: ▲54,938
Location
Notes
- Passenger statistics from the Office of Rail and Road

Llansamlet railway station is a minor station in Llansamlet, Swansea, south Wales. The station is located below street level at Frederick Place in Peniel Green, 212 miles 8 chains (341 km) from London Paddington (via Stroud). It is served by local trains operated by Transport for Wales on the South Wales Main Line between Swansea and Cardiff.

== Former station ==
The former GWR station (from its 1885 opening until closed in 1964) was situated approximately 720 metres (0.45 miles) west of the present station, at 51°39′33″N 3°53′42″W, on the embankment to the west of the Station Road bridge.

Blocked access steps leading up to the platform can still be seen today on the northern approach to the bridge.

== Facilities ==
The station has two (offset) platforms:

- Platform 1, situated east of the Frederick Place overbridge, is for westbound trains towards Swansea
- Platform 2, situated west of the bridge, is for eastbound trains towards Cardiff Central

As the station is unstaffed, passengers boarding must buy their tickets on the train. There is a free car park for rail passengers. Waiting shelters, timetable poster boards and digital CIS displays are provided on each side. Step-free access is available via ramps to both platforms.

== Services ==
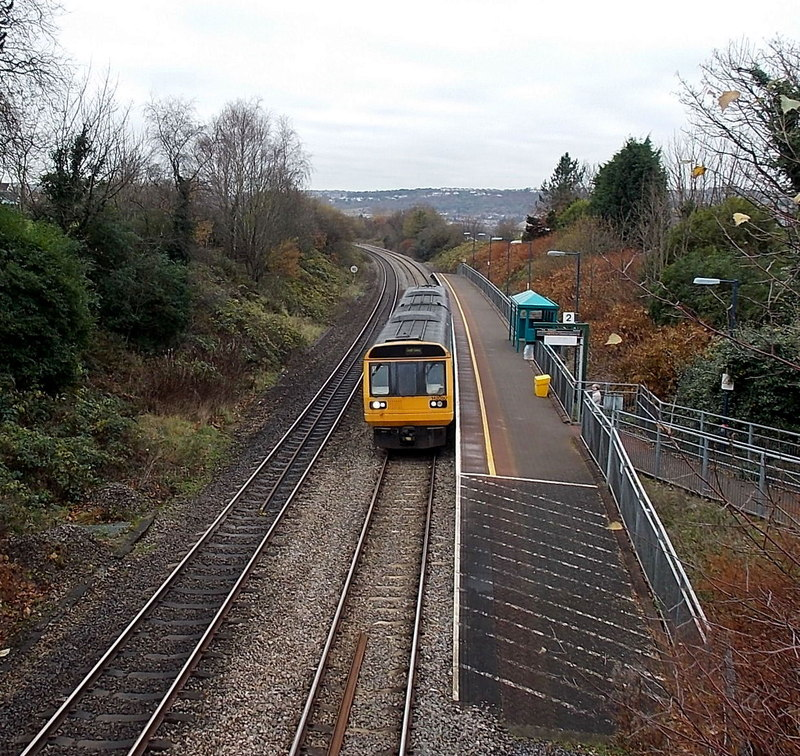
An Arriva Trains Wales Class 142 with a Swanline train to Cardiff Central

Journey times are around 10 minutes to Swansea and one hour to Cardiff.

At present Llansamlet is served by a train every two hours in both directions on weekdays, with a few westbound trains extended to Llanelli or Carmarthen. But no trains at present call on a Sunday. A normal service operates on most Bank Holidays.

Preceding station	National Rail	Following station
Skewen	Transport for Wales; Swanline	Swansea
