= Briton Ferry railway station =

Railway station in Neath Port Talbot, Wales

Briton Ferry Welsh: Llansawel
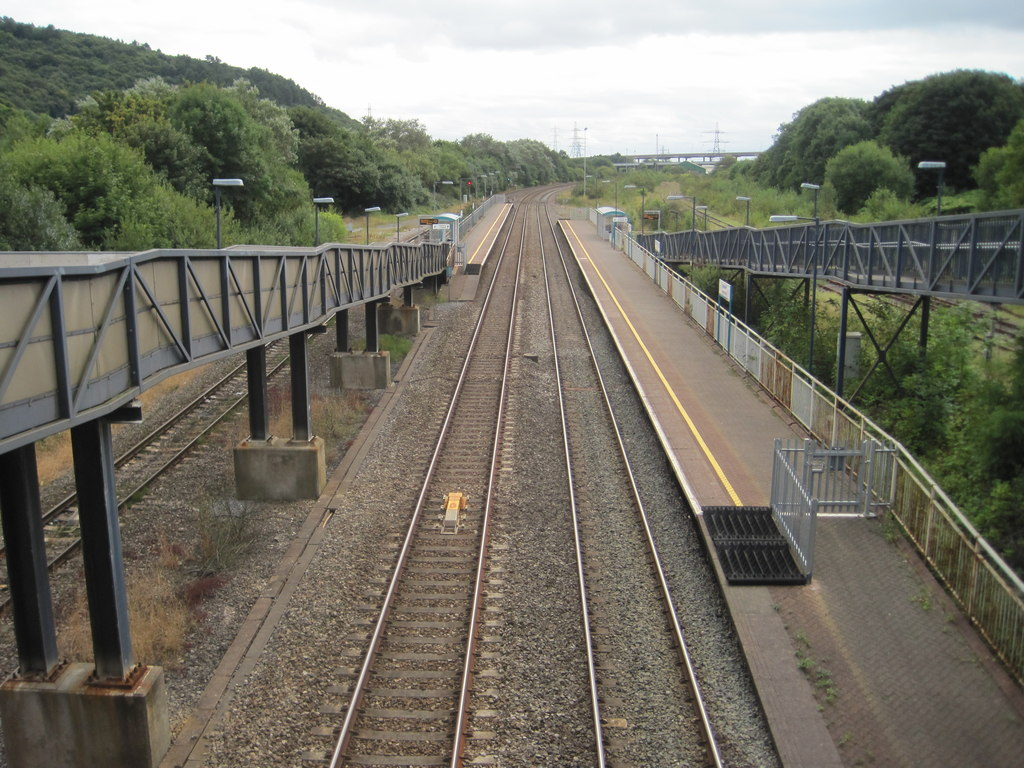

General information
- Location: Briton Ferry, Neath Port Talbot; Wales
- Coordinates: 51.638°N 3.819°W
- Grid reference: SS741948
- Manager: Transport for Wales
- Platforms: 2

Other information
- Station code: BNF
- Classification: DfT category F1

History
- Post-grouping: Great Western Railway

Key dates
- 8 July 1935: opened
- 2 November 1964: Closed
- 1 June 1994: Reopened

Passengers
- 2021/22: ▲20,962
- 2022/23: ▲25,422
- 2023/24: ▲31,274
- 2024/25: ▲41,642
- 2025/26: ▲48,358
Location
Notes
- Passenger statistics from the Office of Rail and Road

Briton Ferry railway station is a minor station in the village of Briton Ferry, south Wales. It is 206 miles 40 chains (332.3 km) from the zero point at London Paddington, measured via Stroud. The station is located at ground level at Shelone Road in Briton Ferry. It is a stop on the South Wales Main Line, served by Transport for Wales Swanline regional trains between Swansea and Cardiff.

The station is sited within the Cwrt Sart junction complex where the Swansea District Line meets the South Wales Main Line. The present station opened on 1 June 1994, which replaced an earlier station that closed to passengers on 2 November 1964 and to goods services on 6 September 1965.

== Facilities ==
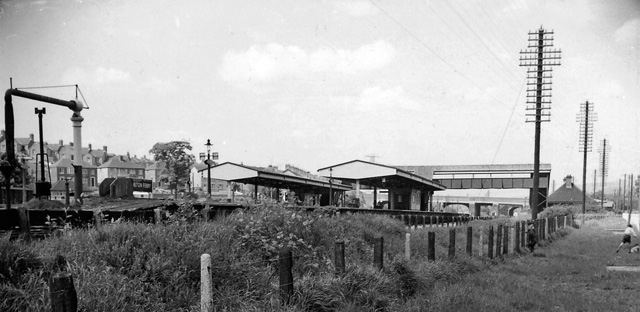
The old Briton Ferry railway station closed to passengers in 1964 and to goods services in 1965.

The station has 2 platforms:

- Platform 1, for westbound trains towards Swansea
- Platform 2, for eastbound trains towards Cardiff Central

The station is unstaffed - there is no ticket office nor are there any platform entry barriers. Passengers must purchase tickets on board trains.

== Services ==
The typical service pattern is one train approximately every two hours in each direction. Some westbound trains continue on to Carmarthen and Milford Haven. There is no Sunday service. A normal weekday service operates on most Bank Holidays.

Preceding station	National Rail	Following station
Baglan	Transport for Wales; Swanline	Neath

== Sources ==
- Butt, R. V. J. (October 1995). The Directory of Railway Stations: details every public and private passenger station, halt, platform and stopping place, past and present (1st ed.). Sparkford: Patrick Stephens Ltd. ISBN 978-1-85260-508-7. OCLC 60251199. OL 11956311M.
