= Neath Indoor Market =

Coordinates: 51.6630°N 3.8054°W

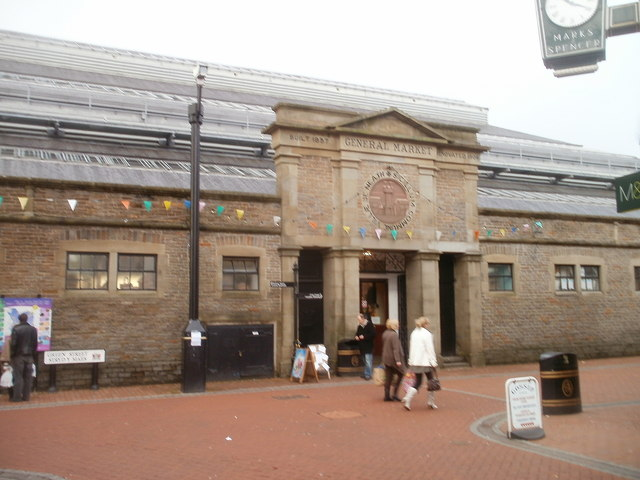
Market entrance

Neath Indoor Market (also known as Neath General Market or simply Neath Market) is an indoor market located in the town centre of Neath, Wales. The market building dates back to 1837. It was renovated in 1904, and most recently in 1999. Today, the market features an eclectic mix of stalls ranging from butchers and fresh vegetable stalls to pet supplies stall and cafes serving traditional Welsh food.

The market building is now grade II listed.
