= Aberafan Centre =

Shopping centre in Port Talbot, Wales

Coordinates: 51.597°N 3.786°W

The Aberafan Shopping Centre is the only indoor shopping complex in Port Talbot, Wales. It currently has a floorspace of 24,100 m^{2} (259,000 sq ft) and houses over sixty stores on two levels, as well as the central library for Port Talbot. It was built in the 1970s by Star Dolphin Developments (part of English Property Corporation) and was refurbished in the late 1990s. It replaced parts of the old town centre, which was substantially demolished between 1971 and 1976 to accommodate a flyover section of the M4 motorway.

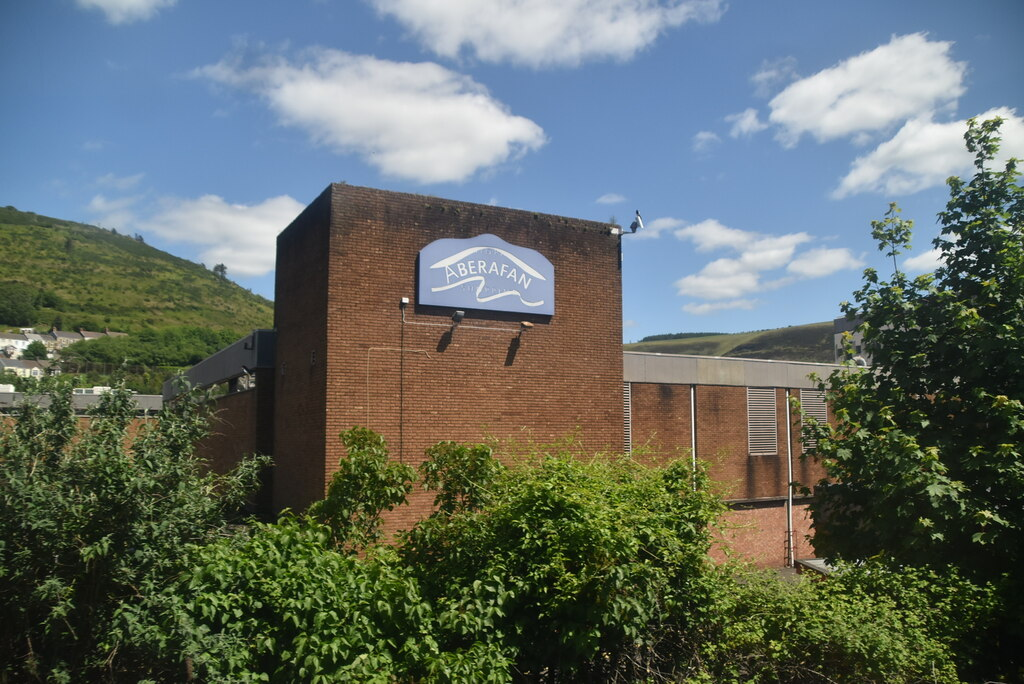
Outside of the shopping center

When the centre opened, it contained a market area with stalls operated mainly by local traders. This replaced a covered market, originally established under the terms of the Aberavon Market Act in 1848. The library moved into the shopping centre in 1997, after being housed in temporary accommodation since the 1970s.

Examples of high-profile stores in the shopping centre include: Home Bargains, Boots, JD Sports, Superdrug, Poundland, Clinton Cards, Iceland, New Look and Argos. There are also many smaller shops like Holland & Barrett.

== Year : 1994 In Aberafan Centre ==
- Aberafan Shopping Centre In 1994 (13 January 1994 – 31 December 1994)

== Aberafan House ==
Rising to the south-east of the Aberafan Centre complex is Aberafan House. This concrete tower block is prominently visible when travelling through Port Talbot on the M4 motorway. The building is used partly by government organisations and partly by private firms.

== Rail Access ==
- Port Talbot Parkway
