= Neath railway station =

Railway station in Neath Port Talbot, Wales

Neath Welsh: Castell-nedd
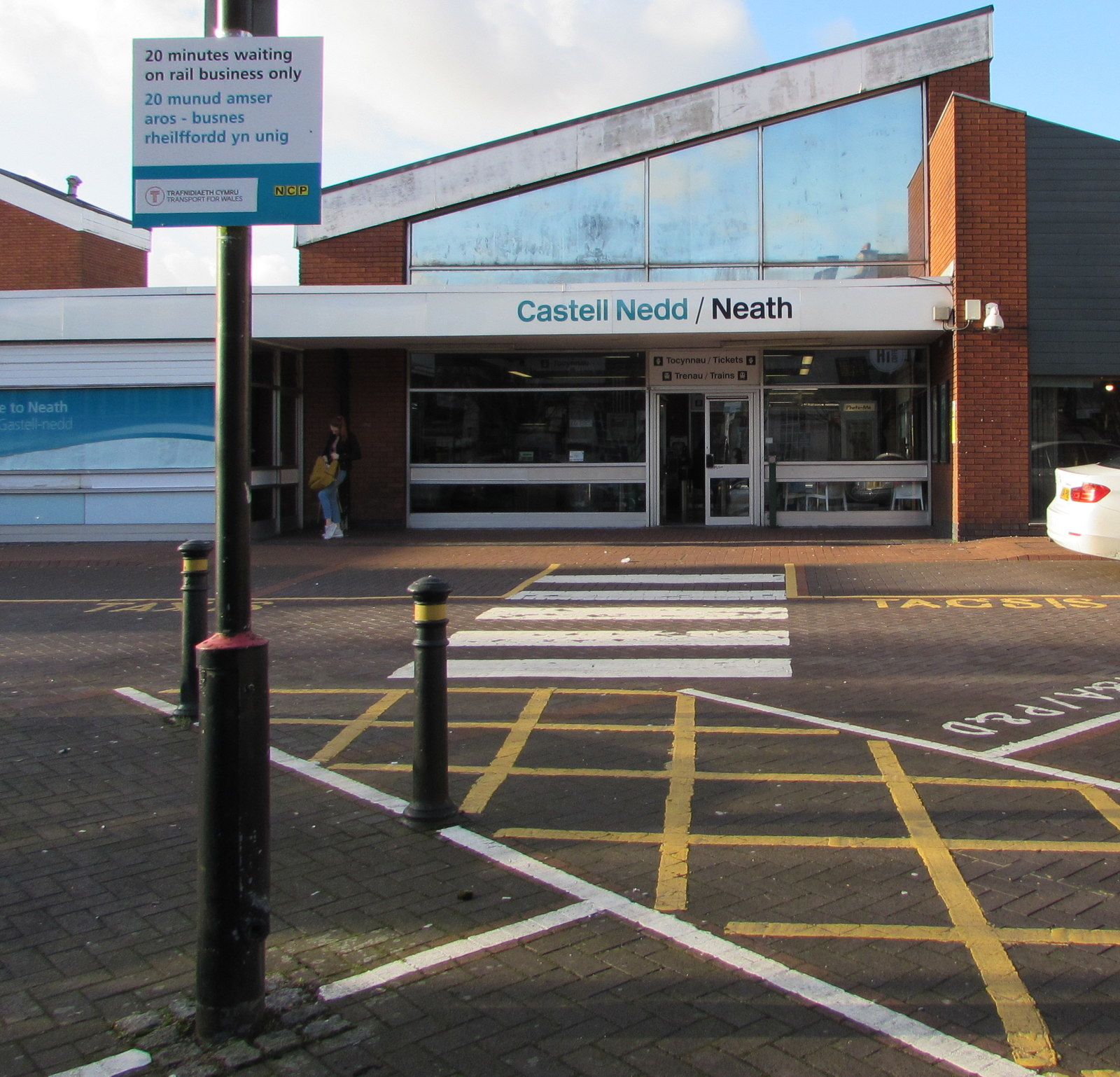

General information
- Location: Neath, Neath Port Talbot; Wales
- Coordinates: 51.662°N 3.807°W
- Grid reference: SS751974
- Manager: Transport for Wales
- Platforms: 2

Other information
- Station code: NTH
- Classification: DfT category D

Passengers
- 2020/21: ▼0.185 million
- 2021/22: ▲0.545 million
- 2022/23: ▲0.666 million
- 2023/24: ▲0.778 million
- 2024/25: ▲0.839 million
Location
Notes
- Passenger statistics from the Office of Rail and Road

Neath railway station is a main line railway station serving the town of Neath, south Wales. Managed by Transport for Wales, the station is located at street level on Windsor Road, situated back from the street fronting a small car park. It is 208 miles 20 chains (335 km) from London Paddington (via Stroud).

== History ==
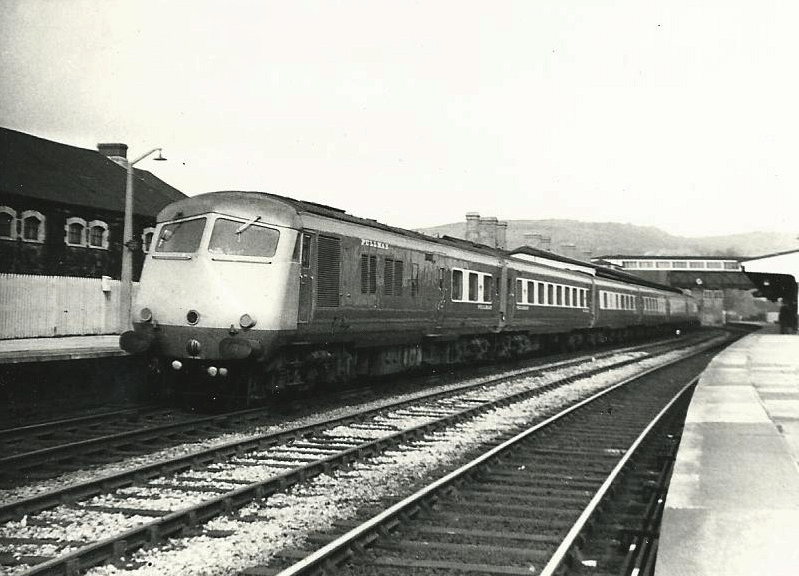
A Swansea-bound South Wales Pullman at Neath General in 1967

The surviving Neath railway station is one of four railway stations originally in Neath, and to distinguish it from the others was at one time named Neath General, the suffix being applied before Nationalisation. Neath Canalside served the Rhondda and Swansea Bay Railway services until they ended in 1963. Neath Riverside (also at times known as Neath Bridge Street and Neath Low Level), served trains to and from Brecon via the Neath and Brecon Railway, with an additional stop at Neath Abbey. The railway itself remains partly in use, linking Onllwyn and the docks. The remains of the Neath Bridge Street station can be seen by looking down at the railway alongside the river bridge just before Neath railway station in the Swansea direction.

Neath General also acted as the western passenger terminus of the Vale of Neath Railway for most of its life - trains running from here to Pontypool Road via Aberdare and Crumlin High Level via a connecting curve at the west end of the station. These ceased in June 1964 (when the line fell victim to the Beeching Axe) and the link line was lifted, though parts of the old VoNR remains intact (but disused) as far as Resolven and from Aberdare to Hirwaun.

The present station buildings date from 1974, when the old GWR structures dating from 1886/87 were demolished and rebuilt in contemporary style by British Rail.

== Facilities ==
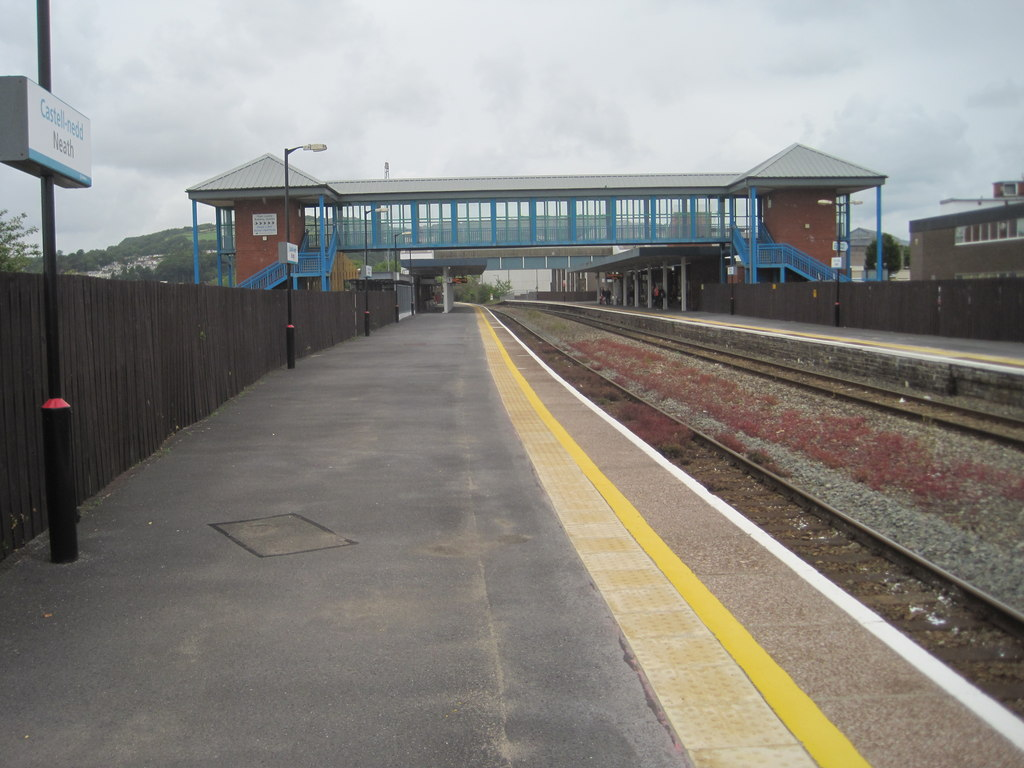
Looking westbound towards Swansea at Neath station

The station has 2 platforms both accessed through ticket barriers:

- Platform 1, for westbound trains towards Swansea, Carmarthen and Milford Haven.
- Platform 2, for eastbound trains towards Cardiff Central, London Paddington and Manchester Piccadilly

The station is fully staffed, with the ticket office open all week. A ticket machine is also provided for use and for collecting pre-paid tickets. Other amenities provided in the main building on platform 2 include a buffet, waiting room, pay phone and toilets. A waiting room is available on platform 1 and both platforms have CIS displays, automated announcements and timetable poster boards. Step-free access is available to the eastbound platform at all times and to the opposite side via a foot crossing when the station is staffed. However a public lift is provided on an overlooking footbridge. Both platforms are considered short, with neither platform being able to fully contain a GWR train.

== Services ==
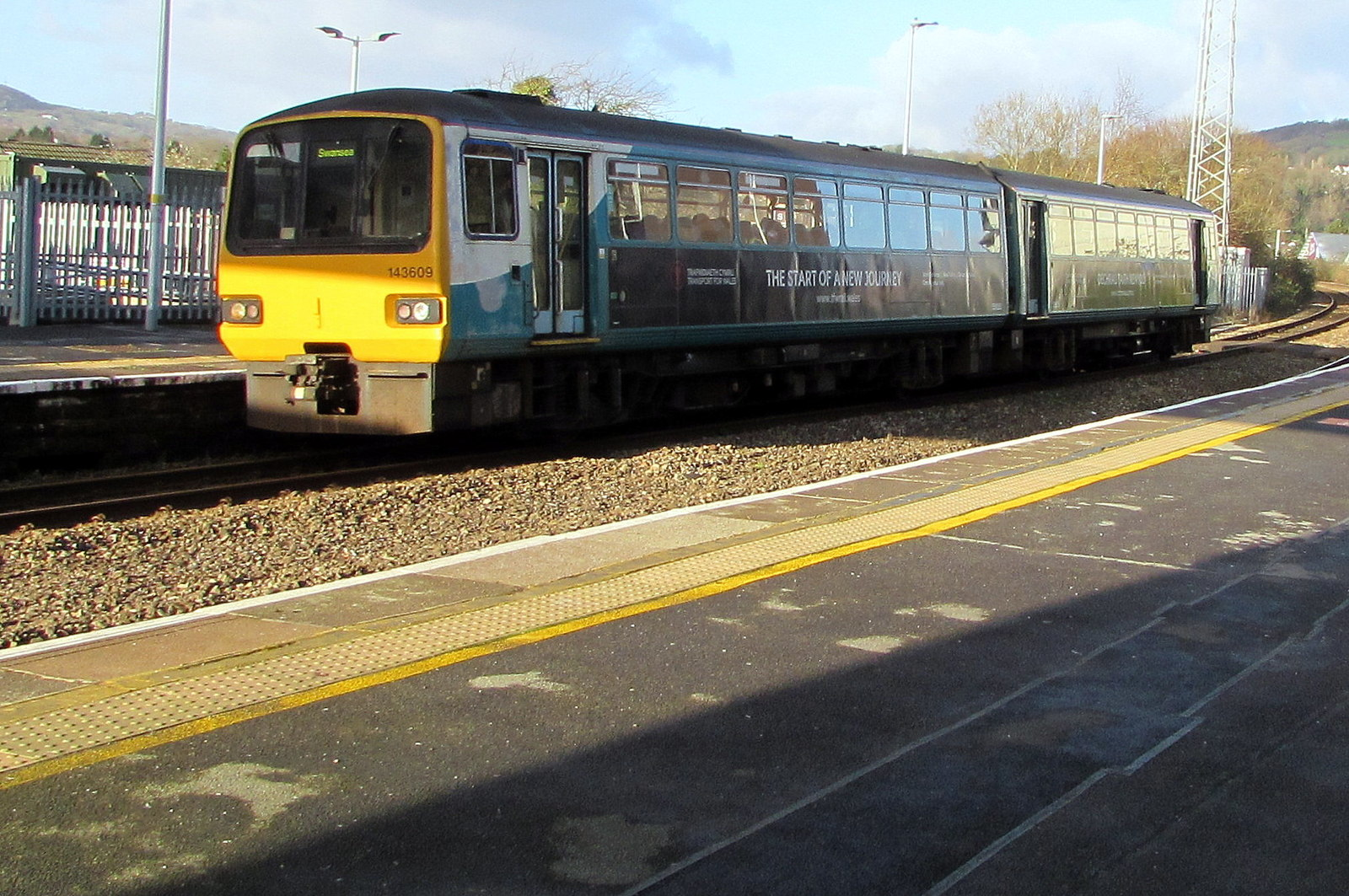
A Transport for Wales Class 143 with a service to Swansea

The station is served by Great Western Railway services between London Paddington and Swansea. The trains run hourly each way with peak extras and Transport for Wales regional trains between Milford Haven/Carmarthen and Manchester Piccadilly via Cardiff, Newport and Shrewsbury (also hourly), plus the two-hourly Swansea to Cardiff stopping trains.

On Sundays the London – Swansea service runs hourly and the Milford Haven/Carmarthen – Manchester trains run every two hours.

Preceding station	National Rail	Following station
Briton Ferry	Transport for Wales; Swanline	Skewen
Port Talbot Parkway	Great Western Railway; London Paddington – Carmarthen	Swansea
Port Talbot Parkway	Transport for Wales; South Wales Main Line	Swansea
