= Swanline =

Local rail service in Wales

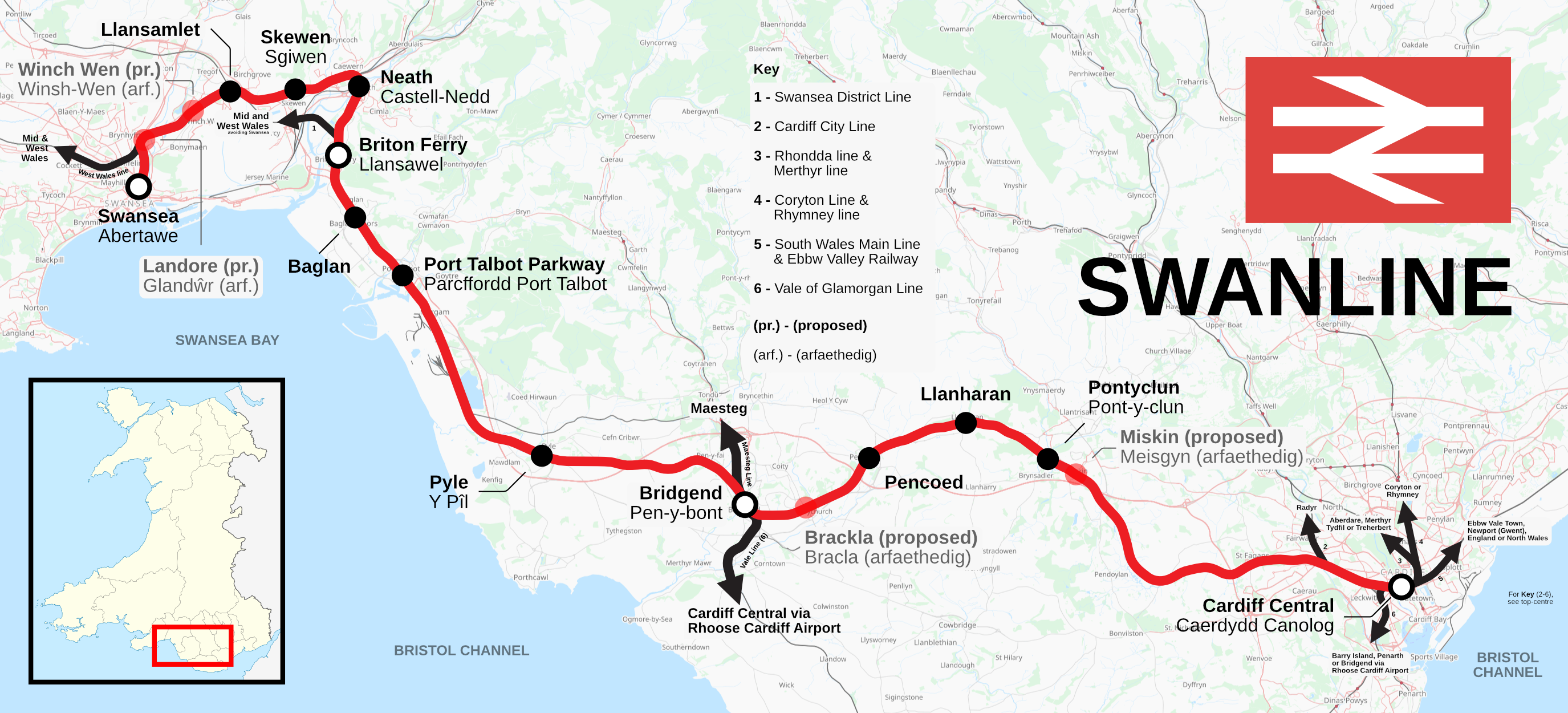
Map of the route taken by services branded/described as "Swanline". Not all stations on the route may be served by every Swanline service.

Swanline is the name of the local rail service from Swansea to Cardiff Central, on the South Wales Main Line.

== History ==
The Swanline service was launched in June 1994, following the construction of five new stations at Pyle, Baglan, Briton Ferry, Skewen and Llansamlet on the existing South Wales Main Line. Originally, an hourly service was provided through a partnership between British Rail and local government, with the local authorities securing EU development funding and retaining ownership of the trains needed to operate the service.

During 1997, as part of railway privatisation, responsibility for Swanline services passed from British Rail's Regional Railways sector to South Wales & West Railway, a newly created franchised train operating company. In 1999, the company halved the service to two-hourly, citing poor passenger usage and offering to purchase the rolling stock for use elsewhere.

From 2003 to 2018, the line was operated as part of the Arriva Trains Wales franchise. In 2018, the franchise passed to KeolisAmey Wales and in 2021 to Transport for Wales Rail. A bi-hourly service is provided on Mondays to Saturdays.

== Potential changes ==
The Swanline service itself is regarded as unattractive to users at its current low frequency, with extremely restricted journey to work options for Swansea commuters, but takes up valuable space on the busy section of line between Bridgend and Cardiff.

Signalling renewal work in 2007 introduced a new turnback facility at Port Talbot station, intended primarily for turnbacks from the Cardiff direction, but actually capable of use by services in either direction. Owing to very light Swanline passenger loadings, it has been proposed that a more useful service could be offered by abandoning through-running to Cardiff and instead operating Swanline trains between Swansea and Port Talbot only. This would provide the Swansea Bay area with a more frequent, hourly service using the same resources (two trainsets).

== See also ==
- Regional Railways
- Transport in Wales
