= Baglan railway station =

Railway station in Neath Port Talbot, Wales

Baglan
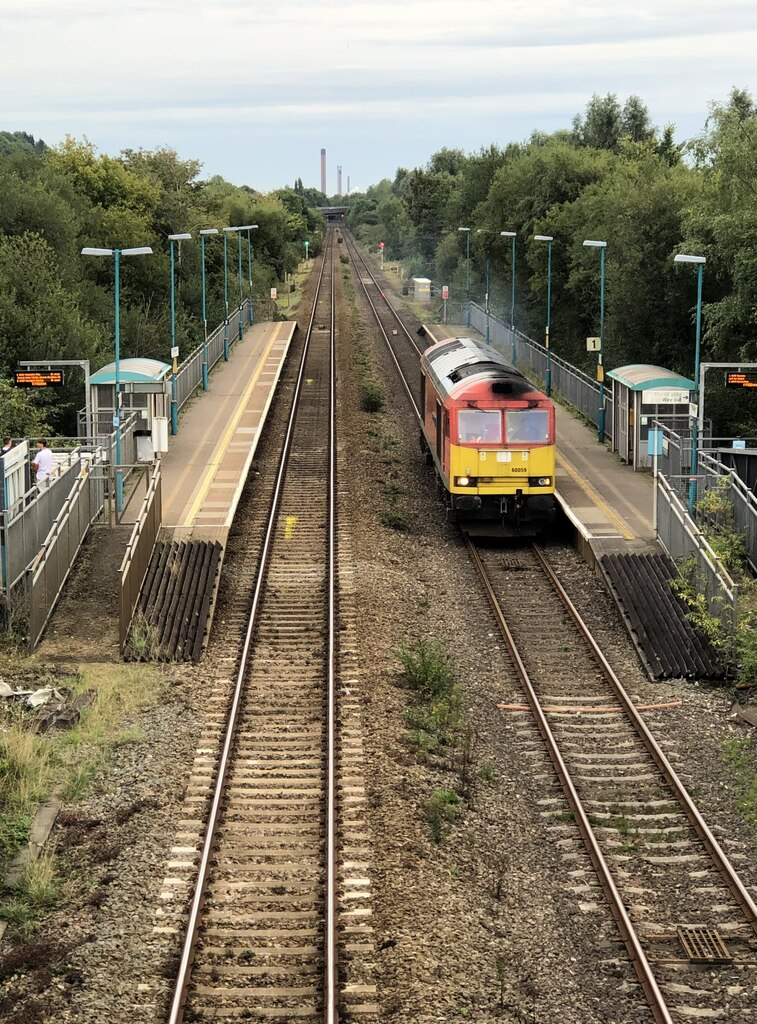

General information
- Location: Baglan, Neath Port Talbot; Wales
- Coordinates: 51°36′52″N 3°48′34″W
- Grid reference: SS749923
- Manager: Transport for Wales
- Platforms: 2

Other information
- Station code: BAJ
- Classification: DfT category F1

History
- Opened: 2 June 1996

Passengers
- 2021/22: ▲17,780
- 2022/23: ▲25,072
- 2023/24: ▼25,040
- 2024/25: ▲35,200
- 2025/26: ▲38,952
Location
Notes
- Passenger statistics from the Office of Rail and Road

Baglan railway station is a minor station in the village of Baglan in Neath Port Talbot county borough, south Wales. It is 204 miles 53 chains (329.4 km) from the zero point at London Paddington, measured via Stroud. It is a stop on the South Wales Main Line, served by Transport for Wales Swanline regional trains between Swansea and Cardiff.

It is a relatively new station, opened in 1996. The station is located at street level but passenger access is from the Seaway Parade flyover. It is close to Neath Port Talbot Hospital.

== Facilities ==
The station has 2 platforms:

- Platform 1, for westbound trains towards Swansea
- Platform 2, for eastbound trains towards Cardiff Central

The station is unstaffed - there is no ticket office nor are there any platform entry barriers. Passengers must purchase tickets on board trains.

== Services ==
The typical service pattern is one train approximately every two hours in each direction (with extras at weekday peak times). Some westbound trains continue on to Carmarthen and Milford Haven whilst some eastbound trains are extended to Newport, Hereford and Manchester Piccadilly. The current Sunday service is very limited, with just two trains each way calling. A normal weekday service operates on most Bank Holidays.

Preceding station	National Rail	Following station
Port Talbot Parkway	Transport for Wales; Swanline	Briton Ferry
