= Swansea railway station =

Railway station in Swansea, Wales

Swansea Welsh: Abertawe
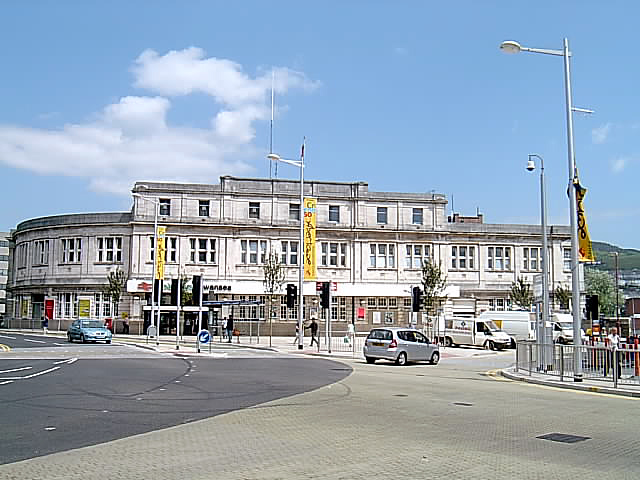

General information
- Location: Swansea, City and County of Swansea; Wales
- Coordinates: 51.6253°N 3.9409°W
- Grid reference: SS657936
- Manager: Transport for Wales
- Platforms: 4

Other information
- Station code: SWA
- Classification: DfT category C1

History
- Opened: 19 June 1850; 176 years ago as Swansea High Street
- Original company: South Wales Railway
- Pre-grouping: Great Western Railway
- Post-grouping: Great Western Railway

Key dates
- 6 May 1968: Renamed Swansea

Passengers
- 2020/21: ▼0.469 million
- Interchange: ▼17,382
- 2021/22: ▲1.478 million
- Interchange: ▲66,720
- 2022/23: ▲1.884 million
- Interchange: ▲96,651
- 2023/24: ▲2.186 million
- Interchange: ▼87,354
- 2024/25: ▲2.304 million
- Interchange: ▼29,264
Location
Notes
- Passenger statistics from the Office of Rail and Road

Swansea railway station serves the city of Swansea, Wales. It is sited 216 miles 7 chains (348 km) from London Paddington, via Stroud, on the National Rail network, although most services use a shorter route via Bristol Parkway. In 2023/24, it was the third-busiest station in Wales, after Cardiff Central and Newport.

== History ==
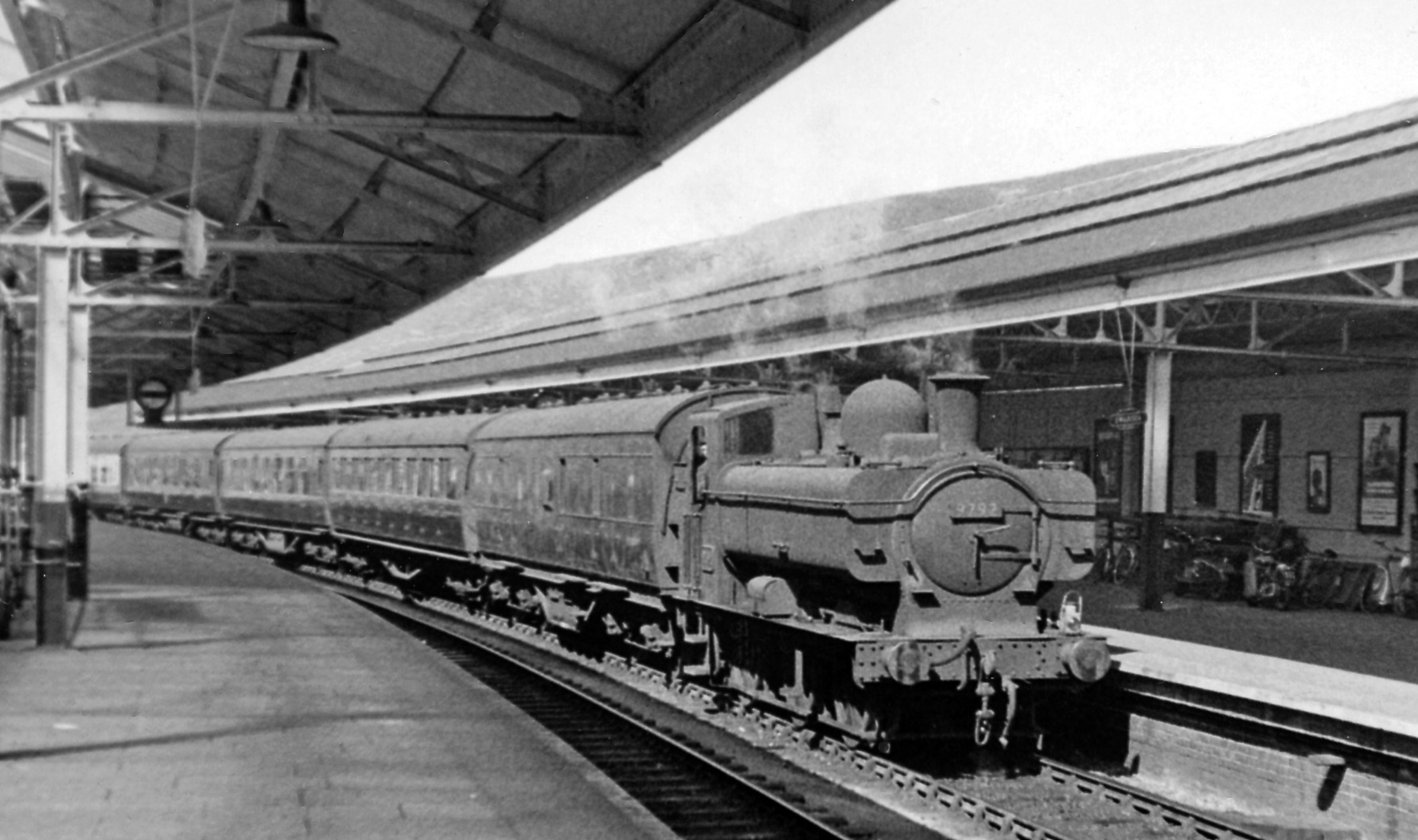
GW 0-6-0PT bringing in empty stock in 1962

The station opened in 1850. It was built by the South Wales Railway, which amalgamated with the Great Western Railway (GWR) in 1863; it was not originally on the South Wales Railway main line, planned to connect London with the port of Fishguard, and Swansea passengers had to change at Landore, two miles to the north until at least 1879. The station has been renovated and extended several times in its lifetime – most notably in the 1880s, when the stone-built office block facing High Street, on the west side of the station, was added, and in 1925–1927 when the platforms were lengthened. The present-day frontage block, facing Ivey Place, was completed in 1934. Nothing now remains of the original wooden station with its two platforms and galvanised iron roof.

The majority of the rebuilt station remains intact, although the facilities have been reduced. The umbrella-type platform roofing which replaced the 1880s train-sheds in the 1920s is mostly intact although the canopy on platform 4 has been shortened. The number of platforms was reduced from five to four in 1973 under British Rail when the old platform 1 was eliminated, along with the loading bays and fish dock that once stood beyond it. The remaining platforms were renumbered at the same time, so that what were platforms 2 to 5 are now platforms 1 to 4 respectively.

On the east side of the station there was a connecting line which bypassed the platforms and ran at one time to coal tips on the North Dock (closed in 1929 and subsequently infilled) and on to a junction with the high-level line from Eastern Depot to Victoria station (closed in 1965). Part of the route of this line, alongside the station itself, is now a staff car park and the remainder, which was carried on viaducts alongside the Strand, has been obliterated by modern development. High Street goods station was on the west side of the line, just north of the passenger station. The site has been completely cleared and used for housing and also the dedicated bus road that runs from the Landore park-and-ride facility into the city centre. On the opposite side of the line were extensive carriage sidings (Maliphant sidings), large areas of which are, as of 2014, being redeveloped as the Hitachi IEP (Intercity Express Programme) rail service depot.

There was great competition between the different railway companies in the nineteenth and early twentieth centuries. Swansea had seven stations in 1895, owned by five different railway companies: High Street (GWR), St Thomas (Midland Railway), East Dock (GWR), Riverside (Rhondda & Swansea Bay Railway, by which it was called simply Swansea; renamed Swansea Docks by the GWR in 1924 and Riverside two years later), Victoria and Swansea Bay (both London & North Western Railway), and Rutland Street (the town terminus of the Mumbles Railway). Only High Street now remains in the city centre.

=== Toponymy ===
For most of its history, the station was known as Swansea High Street to distinguish it from other stations in the area. Following the Beeching cuts in the 1960s and the closure of Swansea Victoria, the name was shortened to Swansea. Today, the station is called Abertawe/Swansea on platform signs, the facade, public timetables, by the National Assembly of Wales and by Swansea County Council.

=== 21st century redevelopment ===
Swansea station received an upgrade in the form of redevelopment work that was completed in 2012, with new facilities including new waiting rooms, bicycle racks and digital information boards. Work was completed in June 2012 and was officially opened by the Welsh Government Minister with responsibility for Transport, Carl Sargeant, on Monday 11 June.

Further redevelopment work was carried out in the form of a new ticket office, completed in September 2017. A new enclosure was constructed for the ticket office, separating it from the main station concourse.

In October 2020, Network Rail and Transport for Wales announced that work will start on rebuilding and lengthening platform 4 to 260 metres (850 ft). This will allow longer trains to use the platform and provide extra flexibility. At the same time, Transport for Wales will undertake other improvement works at the station including re-branding, improved ticket buying facilities and refurbished spaces for use by local businesses and community groups. The work was completed in June 2021.

== Description ==
The station is a terminus, at the end of a short branch off the South Wales Main Line and the West Wales Line, so that all through passenger trains must either reverse at Swansea or omit calling there. In practice, almost all passenger services do call there.

The station has four platforms. Great Western Railway trains from London normally enter the station with the standard-class carriages leading and usually use platform 3. The platforms are covered for part of their length.

Until January 2004, the mail train to London was a regular service from the station.

In February 2013, Swansea station won the Wales’ Best Staffed Train Station award, supported by Keep Wales Tidy.

In May 2013, Swansea station was named International Station of the Year and won the Best Large Station award at the International Station Awards.

The ticket office is open here each day (Monday – Friday 05:15 – 20:00, Saturday 06:15 – 20:00, Sunday 08:00 – 20:00), with self-service ticket machines provided for use when the ticket office is closed and for collecting pre-paid tickets. A range of other amenities are available, including toilets, retail outlets, waiting rooms, ATM, payphone and the local Tourist Information Office. Bus stops and a taxi rank are located outside the entrance. Train running information is offered via timetable posters, digital CIS displays and automated announcements. Step-free access is available to all platforms.

== Platforms ==
The station's four platforms are generally used for the same services, but can change if it is not available. Following the May 2021 timetable update, the normal pattern is:

- Platform 1
  - Transport for Wales:
    - Fishguard Harbour via Carmarthen. Some services originate from Cardiff Central or Cheltenham Spa.
    - Manchester Piccadilly via Newport and Crewe from either Carmarthen or Milford Haven.
    - Terminating services from Shrewsbury via Llandrindod Wells.
- Platform 2
  - Transport for Wales:
    - Carmarthen from either Cardiff Central or Manchester Piccadilly
    - Milford Haven via Carmarthen from Manchester Piccadilly
    - Shrewsbury via Llandrindod Wells that start at Swansea. Some services originate from Cardiff Central.
- Platform 3
  - Great Western Railway:
    - Carmarthen from London Paddington.
    - London Paddington via Cardiff Central.
    - Terminating services from London Paddington via Cardiff Central.
- Platform 4
  - Transport for Wales:
    - Cardiff Central via Port Talbot Parkway that start at Swansea.
    - Pembroke Dock via Carmarthen that start at Swansea.
    - Terminating services from Cardiff Central.
    - Terminating services from Pembroke Dock.

== Services ==
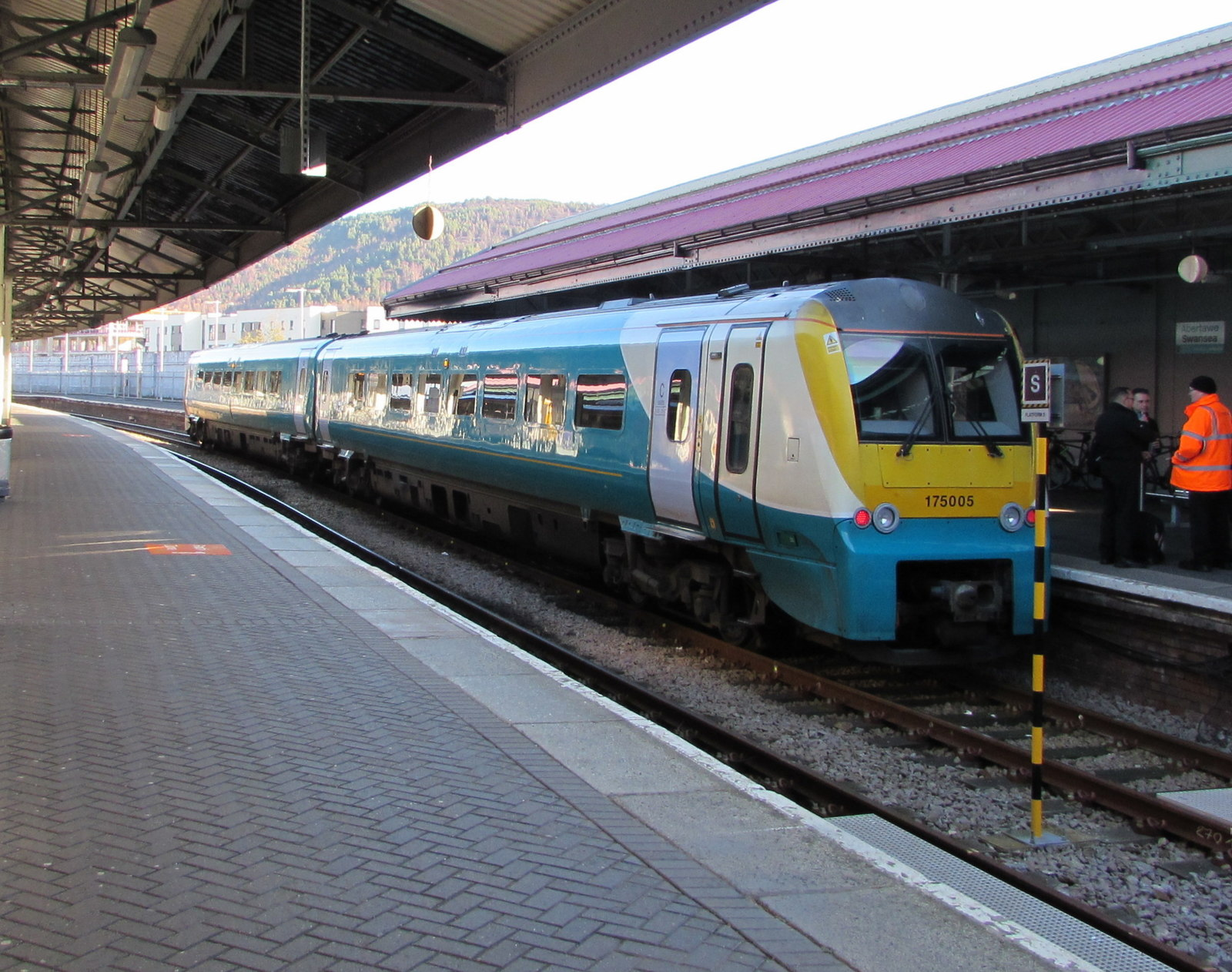
A Transport for Wales Class 175 with a service to Manchester Piccadilly

Swansea is served by two train operating companies:

- Great Western Railway operates inter-city services to London Paddington, via Cardiff Central, along the South Wales Main Line. Most services start/terminate here, but some extend to Carmarthen.
- Transport for Wales provides the majority of services including:
  - Inter-city services to Manchester Piccadilly, via Hereford, Shrewsbury and Crewe
  - Swanline services to Cardiff Central; this provides connections to the South Wales Valleys, Bristol Temple Meads, Taunton, Southampton Central, Portsmouth Harbour, Gloucester, Birmingham New Street and Nottingham
  - West Wales Line to Carmarthen and then to Pembroke Dock, Milford Haven or Fishguard Harbour
  - Heart of Wales line services between Llanelli and Shrewsbury
  - Some boat trains to and from Fishguard Harbour commence at Swansea. These connect with the Stena Line ferry to Rosslare Europort in Ireland, with a daily morning and evening service in both directions. This route has been in existence since 1906.

Preceding station	National Rail	Following station
Llansamlet	Transport for Wales; Swanline	Terminus
Neath	Transport for Wales; West Wales Line	Gowerton
Neath	Transport for Wales; West Wales Line	Llanelli
Gowerton	Transport for Wales; Heart of Wales line	Terminus
Neath	Great Western Railway; London Paddington-South Wales	Terminus
Neath	Great Western Railway; London Paddington-Carmarthen / Pembroke Dock	Llanelli
