= Donald Gee =

English Bible teacher (1891–1966)

Donald Henry Frere Gee (10 May 1891 – 20 July 1966) was an English Pentecostal Bible Teacher. He wrote the book Wind and Flame, which is the story of Pentecostalism in Europe in the 20th century. He was called "The Apostle of Balance."

== Biography ==
Donald Gee was born in London in 1891. His father died of tuberculosis when he was 9.

In October 1905, Seth Joshua, the Welsh revival preacher, was invited to his church to hold a mission. Joshua had a great influence upon the young Evan Roberts and the Welsh Revival, but from the mission in London only three were saved, Donald Gee being one of them. He then became a member of the same Congregational church. Later his mother joined the Baptist church.

At Pentecostal prayer meetings he met a Baptist minister who was pastoring a divided church. Half wanted to go the way of Pentecost and half resisted this strongly. When the organist resigned hoping to cause problems, he offered his services and so joined this divided church. Soon those preferring a Pentecostal experience followed Pastor Saxby out into a new Church. Of this man's ministry Gee says "the first seven years of my Pentecostal experience were spent under the powerful influence of a pastor who was a shining example of his office." It was under this ministry that he made his first attempts at testifying and preaching. The First World War had started in 1914, but in 1916 conscription was introduced. Gee registered immediately as a conscientious objector, and went to work on a dairy farm in Buckinghamshire. The next three years prepared him for ministry. He was a social outcast; most often he worked to the point of utter physical exhaustion, and the Gees continued tithing with little to live on. After a year they moved to a second farm (Pophleys) where the farmer (Henry Simmons) was a believer. Nearby was a small mission hall with simple earnest believers. The Gees joined this group, with Donald Gee often preaching on Sunday nights concerning the coming of the Lord and Pentecostal experience. Their home was used for 'Tarrying' meetings, where believers sought and received the Baptism with the Holy Spirit. When the War ended in 1918, he returned to London, now twenty-seven years old, with his wife and two children.

At odd times he had opportunities to preach in some Pentecostal fellowship in London, sometimes cycling ten miles. One such weekend Saxby asked him if he would consider going to preach in Edinburgh as a church was seeking a pastor. In June 1920 he made his first journey there. At the first service a dozen troubled believers gathered, and he would spend the next twelve years as pastor of this church. In 1921 he attended the international Pentecostal convention in Amsterdam. Additionally, he played the organ while Stephen Jeffreys preached at the Kingsway Convention. That same year at the Swanwick convention it came to light that his old pastor, Saxby, had embraced the 'ultimate reconciliation' teaching, that hell would but last a short time and that finally all would be saved—even Judas. This was rejected by others. Elim's statement of faith included "We believe in the…eternal conscious punishment of all Christ rejecters"; later, the Assemblies of God's statement referred to "The everlasting punishment of all who are not written in the Book of Life". Gee published articles in the magazines of both groups concerning the scriptural teaching on 'Eternal Punishment'.

After his first anniversary the conditions and pressures against him in the fellowship and outside were so great that he ran off to London in despair. After two weeks, however, he returned ready to battle through. Next came the news that the biggest financial giver in the church was moving to Australia, but they continued. In 1922 the church bought a new building called 'Bonnington Toll Hall'; over the next years men like Jeffreys, Burton, A. H. Carter and Smith Wigglesworth ministered there. Gee brought correction to the abuses of Spiritual gifts and systematically taught the people the Word. During these years he gave himself to study and personal writing. In 1923 he considered joining Elim but finally decided not to as he would have to hand over the deeds of the building. In 1924 Gee was one of a small group who met together to bring about the formation of Assemblies of God in Great Britain and Ireland. From 1925 to 1963 he sat on the executive presbytery.

His ministry in Edinburgh prospered and he was set in heart for a lifelong ministry in this church. But in 1928 he received a telegram from Australia inviting him to come there for a period of ministry. Donald Gee and his wife both fell on their knees in prayer and received the witness that this was of the Lord. This trip turned out to last ten months including New Zealand, America and Canada. On the journey to Australia he wrote his first book, Concerning Spiritual Gifts. In 1929 he resigned from 'Bonnington Toll Hall' and now used it as a base. This was the beginning of twenty-three years of international ministry trips covering all five continents. Invitations poured in from across the world. He ministered much to a Bible School in Danzig (Gdańsk) and helped with their publishing. The years 1931–33 saw him travel to twelve countries annually. Then he became joint editor of the magazine Redemption Tidings. This had been a critical time in the whole movement: the 1920s had seen the fiery ministry of travelling evangelists, but the 1930s needed the steadying ministry of someone with the 'gifting' of the teacher to keep things on course (the distinction being in reference to Ephesians 4:11).

In 1939 at the outbreak of war he gave himself to constant travel in Britain encouraging the fellowships. After the war at the Pentecostal World Convention in Zurich in 1947, Gee was chosen to become the editor of the magazine World Pentecost, of which he produced 76 issues himself. Again he continued his international travels over these years keeping abreast of the Pentecostal Movement worldwide. He helped to advance the cause of the incipient charismatic movement by drawing attention to new spiritual developments in the mainline churches and he tracked the career of David du Plessis in Pentecost. In 1949 he updated and published his book the Pentecostal Movement later called Wind and Flame. In 1951 he was approached by the board of Governors for the newly acquired Assemblies of God college at Kenley to become Principal; he accepted. After years of travel and now sixty years old he settled down to this task for the next thirteen years, during which he took no salary. He was able to leave a mark upon the students who were setting out to serve God drawing on years of Pastoring and travel. In 1962 he retired from all his positions and responsibilities but continued writing for magazines. Over the years he had written over twenty books and numberless articles. He had done much in getting recognition for and establishing the ministry gift of Teacher amongst Pentecostals. On 20 July 1966, while travelling in a taxi in London, Donald Gee, the 'Apostle of Balance', died of a heart attack.

John Carter, his friend for over forty years, said the following at the funeral: "A gifted writer has laid down his pen. An eminent Bible expositor will teach no more. A distinguished editor has vacated his chair. A renowned author has concluded his last volume. A veteran leader has left our ranks. A great warrior has fought his last battle. Our friend Donald Gee has fallen asleep."

== Bibliography ==
1. Concerning Spiritual Gifts
2. God's Grace and Power For Today
3. Now That You've Been Baptized In the Spirit
4. Spiritual Gifts In the Work Of the Ministry Today
5. The Fruit Of the Spirit
6. The Pentecostal Movement (1949)

== Donald Gee Centre ==
At Regents Theological college, England, is the Donald Gee Centre, which contains a library dedicated to Pentecostal and Charismatic research.

External Link: An audio recording of Donald Gee teaching on the subject of "Spiritual Gifts".
