= May John =

Soprano singer

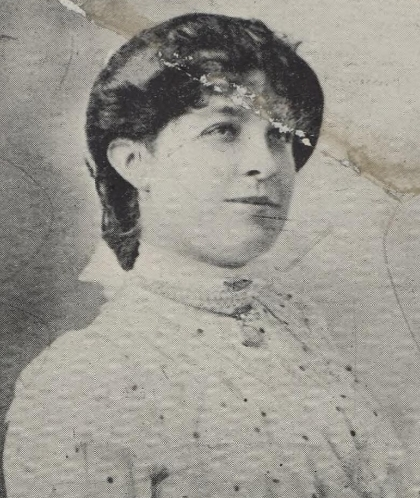
- Born: Mary Hannah John; 26 January 1874; Ton Pentre, Wales
- Died: 18 October 1962 (aged 88); Porth, Wales
- Occupation: singer
- Known for: singing during the 1904–1905 Welsh revival

Mary Hannah John (26 January 1874 – 18 October 1962) was a Welsh soprano singer who was involved with the 1904–1905 Welsh revival.

== Life ==
John was born in Ton Pentre in 1874. She was the penultimate of the seven children born to the Calvinistic Methodist couple of Morgan and Mary John. Her father ran a shoe shop and he was a deacon in Ton Pentre' Jerusalem Chapel where Mary John would sing with their Band of Hope.

She became a student of Clara Novello Davies who had started the Royal Welsh Ladies' Choir.

In 1893 two of her students, John and Elsie Drinkwater won a prize at the National Eisteddfod in Pontypridd singing 'Quis est homo?' from Rossini's Stabat Mater. This led to an invitation for her choir to attend the World's Columbian Exposition in Chicago that year. At the Exposition May John took the prize for best soprano. In the following February she and three others sang for Queen Victoria at Osborne House.

She went on to study further at the Royal Academy of Music from 1894 to 1896.

In February 1904 the Welsh religious revival after Florrie Evans is said to have inspired listeners and this was the beginning of the revival. John paused her professional career to take part. She sang back in her home town and she sang and preached at revival meetings in Wales and England. She was said to have called on women to bring their talents to get involved.

In January 1905 she went to work with the Calvinistic Methodist W. Llewelyn Lloyd. She was then at Broadmead Wesleyan Chapel in Bristol where she and John Cynddylan Jones lead the services.

In June 1905 Evan Roberts preached to 6,000 people at Rhosneigr in the open air. He was assisted by a wooden platform and May John who had been part of a group touring North Wales revival meetings.

John died in Porth in 1962 and her death was not reported with an obituary.
