= Joseph Jenkins (pastor) =

Calvinistic Methodist preacher

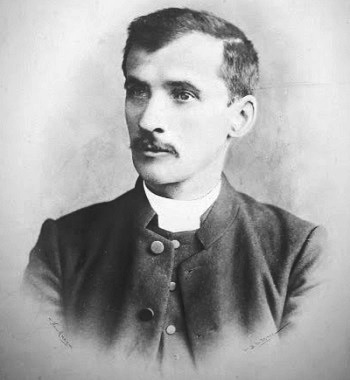
Pastor Joseph Jenkins, Calvinistic Methodist minister, leader in the Welsh Revival, 1904-1905

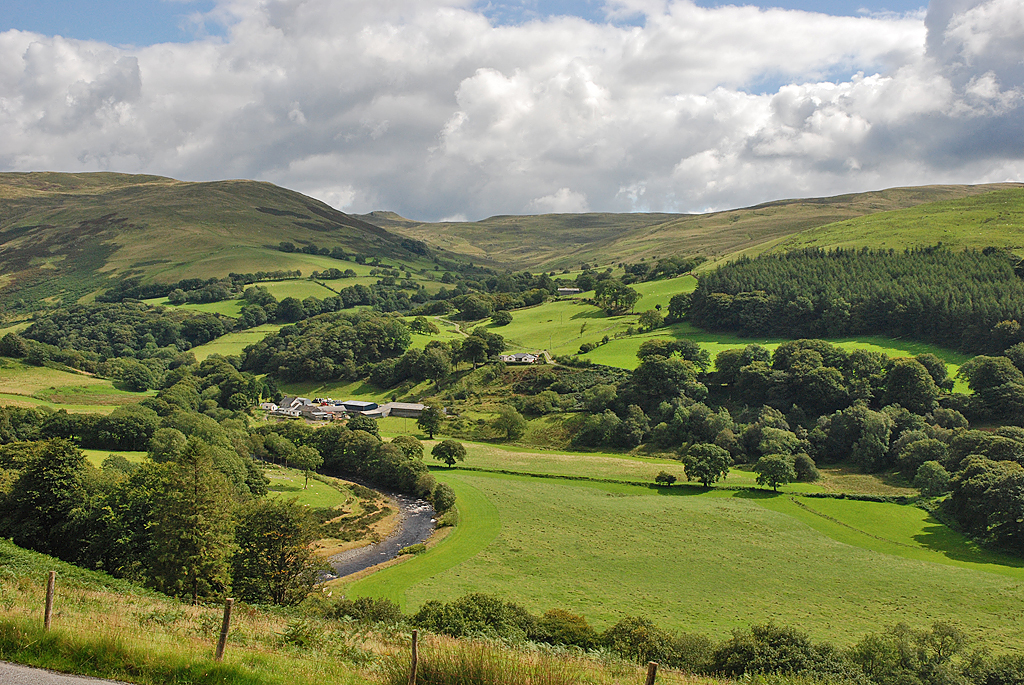
The village of Cwmystwyth, where Jenkins was born, sits in the valley of the Ystwyth river. It is near the UK's largest lead mine.

Joseph Jenkins (2 November 1859 – 27 April 1929) was a Calvinistic Methodist preacher, known as a progenitor of the 1904-1905 Welsh revival, a Christian revival in which, the BBC says, "a hundred thousand people had made a new commitment." A strong personality, Jenkins affected many church communities as a preacher, his contemporaries saying he resembled a volcano — "sometimes lifeless and sometimes in full eruption."

== Background and childhood ==
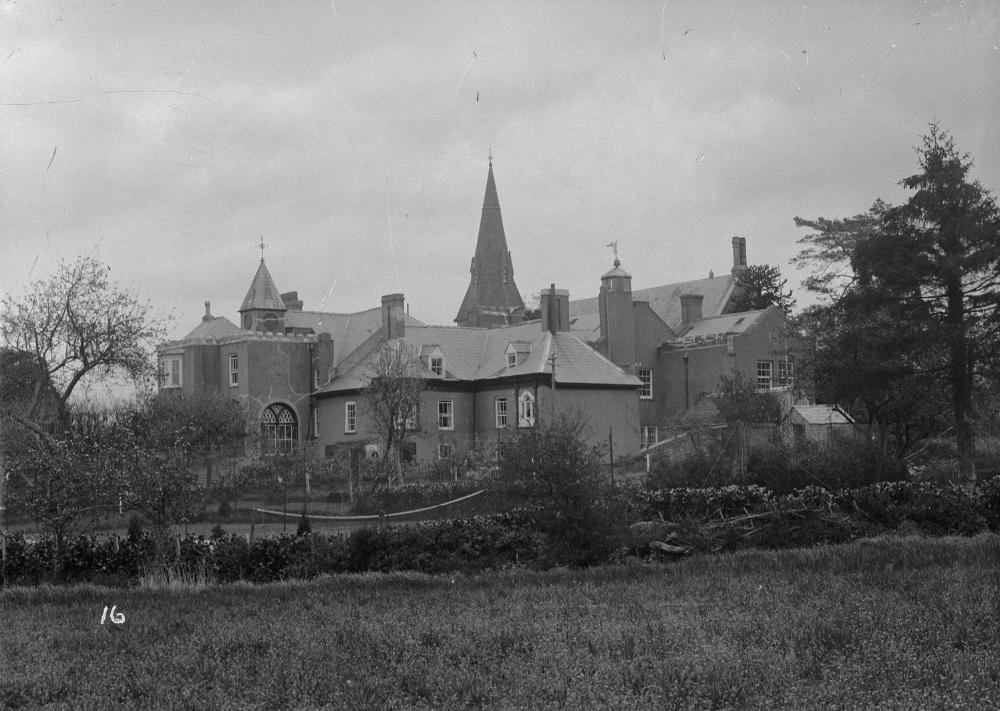
Trevecca College, the liberal arts college in Powys where Jenkins was trained, is the inspiration for other schools, including Trevecca Nazarene University.

Jenkins was born to Mary and John Jenkins on 2 November 1859. John was a miner at the local Cwmystwyth lead mine, where the life expectancy for miners was just 32 years, due to the toxic effects of lead exposure.

Jenkins trained to be a draper in his youth, taking an apprenticeship to John Lloyd, in Pentre, Rhondda. He became a member of Nazareth Chapel, a Welsh-speaking Calvinistic Methodist faith community, where he began to preach. He was educated at William James's school at Cardiff and the Pontypridd Academy. He was then sent to Trevecca College in Trefeca — the same college where the miner-preacher Evan Roberts was trained.

== Ministry ==
Following his theological training, Jenkins was ordained a Minister in the Presbyterian denomination in 1887. He went to minister in reformed churches in England and Wales, including: Caerphilly, Spellow Lane Church, Walton, New Quay, Dolgellau, Festiniog and Llandovery.

In 1903, he attended what became known as the first "Keswick in Wales", a Bible teaching and prayer convention held in Llandrindod. The ministry affected him along with others who would become leaders in the Welsh Revival, such as Seth Joshua. In the months after the convention, Jenkins introduced Sunday morning "after-meetings" attracting young people to his church community in New Quay, Ceridigion. Concurrently, Jenkins reports prayer experiences in which he says he was "clothed with power from on high." From this time, his preaching was known to strongly affect audiences:

"Volcanic is the only word to describe Joseph Jenkins. He can only be explained in the light of the spiritual and eternal."

Jenkin's theological commitments were Calvinist, which includes a developed view of the doctrine of election. He's recorded as preaching that doctrine with great fervour while describing the crucifixion of Christ at Calvary: “What took place there? An election!"

== 1904–1905 Welsh revival ==
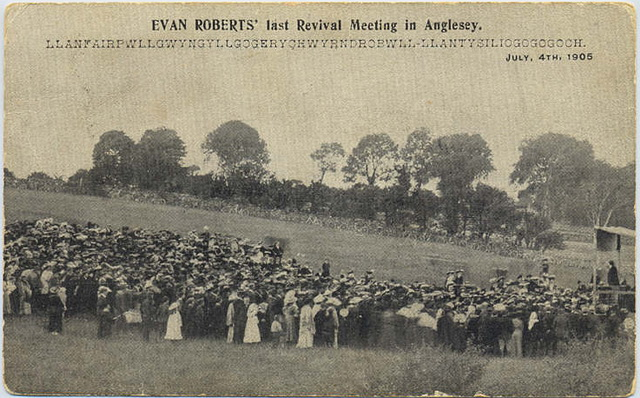
While the revival began with the preaching of Joseph Jenkins, it soon passed to a coal miner, Evan Roberts, seen preaching to a crowd in Anglesey on 4 July 1905.

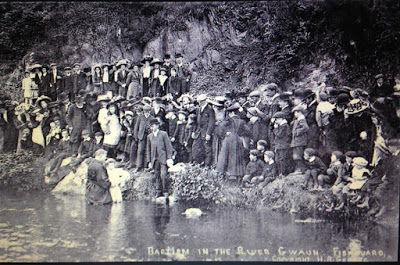
Large baptisms were a feature of the Welsh Revival, such as this baptism in the River Gwaun, Pembrokeshire. Dan Davies is seen conducting the service.

Jenkins is remembered primarily as one of the leaders of the 1904–1905 Welsh revival. Estimates vary, but it is widely reported that approximately 70,000 people came to faith in Jesus Christ in the first two months and over 100,000 during the course of the revival.

In the preceding months, Jenkins was said to be constantly in prayer asking God to bring a great move of the Holy Spirit to the local area. Some Christians believe in a phenomenon known as the Baptism with the Holy Spirit, whereby Christian believers undergo a secondary spiritual experience, which they claim gives them a more intimate spiritual encounter with God. It is reported that Jenkins had himself experienced this phenomenon in late 1903.

One Sunday morning in February 1904, he held a prayer meeting for young people at his church in New Quay and asked them to share about how they viewed God. One boy said, “Jesus is the light of world,” to which Jenkins is reputed to have replied, “Yes, but what does He mean to you?” 20-year-old Florrie Evans rose to her feet and declared, “Rydw i'n caru Arglwydd Iesu Grist a'i holl galon” in Welsh (“I love the Lord Jesus Christ with all of my heart”). Contemporary witnesses claim that in that instant the Holy Spirit descended on the room bringing everyone present to repentance and faith in Jesus Christ. Witnesses said the young people started weeping and declaring their love for Jesus.

This prayer meeting held by Jenkins is regarded as the touch paper that lit the fuse of the Welsh revival. A journalist named W. T. Stead who was present that day wrote: “The pathos and the passion of the avowal (of that young girl) acted like an electric shock upon the congregation. One after another rose and made the full surrender, and the news spread like wildfire from place to place that the Revival had broken out, and that souls were being ingathered to the Lord.”

The revival quickly spread throughout the whole country with many thousands expressing repentance of sin and faith in Jesus Christ. The Manchester Guardian reported on the extraordinary events taking place on 31 December 1904; "... converts during the revival, vouched for in every case by the minister or secretary of the churches supplying the returns, give a total of over 20,000 for Glamorganshire, part of Monmouthshire, and part of Breconshire, and this number is being added to daily."

== Later life and death ==
After his key involvement in the famous revival of 1904-1905, Jenkins remained a committed and influential Christian preacher for the remainder of his life, serving as pastor in at least six different parishes in England and Wales.

He was most revered for the power and effectiveness of his preaching, but those who knew him best testified to the intensity and studiousness of his prayer life. His wife recounted how she would look in at his study at 11pm before going to bed where she found him on his knees in prayer. She would return the next morning at 6:30am and find him still on his knees in his study in the same attitude of prayer.

The regard in which he was held by the Welsh Presbyterian Christian community he was a leader of throughout his career is witnessed to by the testimonial held for him at the General Assembly held in Aberdare. After many months of illness, the Assembly presented him with a cheque at the testimonial.

Jenkins died on 27 April 1929 at 69 years of age and was buried in the chapel cemetery of his home village in Cwmystwyth.
