= Leucarum =

Coordinates: 51.662°N 4.077°W

Map showing Loughor with the position of the Roman auxiliary fort of Leucarum

Leucarum was a coastal auxiliary fort in the Roman province of Britannia. Its remains are located beneath the town of Loughor in the Welsh city of Swansea. The Romans built a rectangular or trapezoidal fort of some 2 hectares (4.9 acres) at the mouth of the River Loughor (Afon Llwchwr) in the AD70s as a garrison for Roman auxiliary troops. From initial Archaeological discoveries in the mid-19th century, through to major excavations during the 1980s, the fort is now well-documented as one of a number of such forts along the South Wales coast.

== Construction and use ==
Early construction, from around AD73, was mostly in timber with earth banks, but successive rebuilds of both defenses and internal buildings in stone defences indicate some 50 years of intermittent use perhaps due to unrest or uneasy occupation until around AD120. It was subsequently abandoned for a time and by the early 3rd century the ditch had naturally silted up. It appears to have been more actively renovated (with a reduction in size at the western end) and put back into use by the later 3rd century, including the period when Carausius declared himself emperor in Britain and northern Gaul (Imperium Britanniarum). It was abandoned again by the Romans by the 330s, this time for good. A Norman castle was later built in one corner of the fort. A medieval Church occupied a prominent position in the centre of the fort area, which was rebuilt on the same foundations in 1885.

== Antonine Itinerary ==
The only early documented use of the name 'Leucarum' occurs in the Antonine Itinerary, which has lists of distances and destinations along roads of the Roman Empire. The lists however are ambiguous or confusing in places, and it requires some adjustments to equate Leucarum with Loughor (Welsh: Llwchwr), but the strong name similarities meant it was assumed to be so even in 1695, and subsequent discoveries of a substantial Roman occupation have left little room for doubt.

== Archaeology ==
The earliest archaeological evidence of Roman occupation came in 1851, when railway and station works came across a Roman bath-house. Other small finds had sustained the idea that Romans had occupied the area, but early Ordnance Survey maps had speculatively located the fort to an area 200m to the north-east. In 1969, during an excavation of the Castle mound, it was found to be built against (and cut into) the Roman walls. This and other small-scale excavations established the wall-line along three sides, but it was only when 1980s investigations ahead of a new road layout revealed not one but two separate western ramparts that a fuller picture was established. A new route for the A484, leading to the 1988-built Loughor road bridge across the Loughor Estuary required extensive salvage archaeology by the Glamorgan-Gwent Archaeological Trust, and resulted in 'one of the most comprehensive investigations of an auxiliary fort in Wales in recent years'.

The 1997 report, following the two multi-season digs of the 1980s, concluded that there were 8 distinct phases of use/activity at the fort site.

- Period I, AD73/4 to 80: Initial construction of ramparts, roads, granary and ovens. Much of the site remained unused.
- Period II, AD80 to 85:Road resurfacing and replacement of granary building.
- Period III, AD85 to 100: Some road improvements and addition of a small Praetorium, but the fort was seemingly abandoned by the end of the period.
- Period IV, AD100 to 105: Substantial refurbishment of the fort, perhaps connected with a new garrison arrival. The extra-mural bath-house dates from this period.
- Period V, AD105 to 110: Yet another new Praetorium, suggesting a change of command and a further construction phase.
- Period VI, AD110 to 115/120: A major refurbishment with revetting of ramparts and a new-cut ditch. A new stone house for the commander was built.
- Period VII, AD120 to 260: There are indications that the fort was again abandoned, and at some point during this period a new western rampart was constructed within the old fort, resulting in a significantly smaller fortified area. The order of these events is not clear and such evidence of activity as has been identified relates more to industrial than military purposes.
- Period VIII, AD260 to 320+: Construction activity within the reduced-area fort included building a stone wall along the top of the ramparts on the north side. The most recent datable Roman item from the digs was a coin describing Constantine II (emperor) as 'Caesar', which was his title from AD324 to 330. This is taken to indicate an abandonment of the fort by or soon after those dates.
