= Gwilym Gwent =

Welsh composer

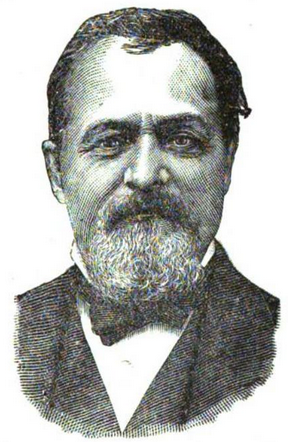
Gwilym Gwent, aka William Aubrey Williams

Gwilym Gwent (born William Aubrey Williams on November 28, 1834) was a Welsh-born composer who immigrated in mid-life to the United States. He died on July 3, 1891.

== Early life ==
William Aubrey Williams was born at Tredegar in 1834, where as a boy he sang in a choir with his uncle.

Williams trained as a blacksmith, but as a young man moved to Blaenau Gwent where he became conductor of a local orchestra. He was one of the most popular and prolific composers in Wales in his time, composing "part-songs", anthems and solos.

In 1865, Williams won prizes for two compositions at the Aberystwyth eisteddfod, including a prize for a duet for female voices, and a ten-pound prize for his cantata, "Y Mab Afradlon".

With David Lewis (1828–1908), Williams edited Llwybrau Moliant, a collection of hymn-tunes for use by Welsh Baptists, a volume which contains several hymn-tunes of his own composition.

== Coal mines and music ==
In 1872, Williams and his wife, Cecilia, emigrated from Wales. They settled at Plymouth, in Pennsylvania's Wyoming Valley, where (like many other Welsh immigrants) Williams found work in the anthracite coal mines. While working as a blacksmith at the Nottingham Colliery, he wrote musical scores in chalk on whatever surface he could find, including sides of coal cars. Some called him the "Mozart of the Mines." Although he was in America, he continued to submit compositions and win awards at eisteddfod. His best-known compositions include "Yr Haf (The Summer)", "Y Gwanwyn (The Spring)", and "Y Clychau (The Bells)", all songs written for glee choirs.

Williams led the first brass band in Wilkes-Barre, Pennsylvania. He also edited a collection of Welsh hymns with Thomas Jenkins.

== Death and legacy ==
Williams died in 1891 at the age of 56, and his funeral drew more than 5,000 mourners. Four years later, his admirers raised sufficient funds to build a monument in his honor, which was unveiled at Hollenback Cemetery in Wilkes-Barre, with music for the ceremony provided by Clara Novello Davies and the Royal Welsh Ladies' Choir, then touring America.

In 1934, a gathering of 500 Welsh-Americans in Wilkes-Barre, including his three daughters, marked the centennial of Gwilym Gwent's birth. Judge Arthur H. James spoke on the occasion:

"Gwilym Gwent spread joy and music among the hearts of his people. He gathered neither wealth nor power, but received his reward by interpreting in music the beauties he saw around him. He left a sweetness that half a century still finds un-dimmed."

== See also ==
- Plymouth, Pennsylvania
- Coal mining in Plymouth, Pennsylvania
