= Gwent =

Gwent may refer to:

== Places ==
- Kingdom of Gwent, a post-Roman Welsh kingdom or principality which existed in various forms between about the 5th and 11th centuries, although the name continued in use later
- Gwent (county), a preserved county in Wales
  - The operational area of Gwent Police
- Gwent, a Celtic region which at one time covered part of modern-day Hampshire in England

== People ==
- Gwilym Gwent, adopted name of Welsh-born American composer William Aubrey Williams (1834–1891)
- Richard Gwent (died 1543), a chaplain of King Henry VIII and official in the Church of England

== Other uses ==
- Coleg Gwent, a further education college in Wales
- A card game in The Witcher novels by Andrzej Sapkowski
  - A card game in the 2015 video game The Witcher 3: Wild Hunt
  - Gwent: The Witcher Card Game, a 2018 video game based on the card game
