= Geoff Howells =

Geoff Howells may refer to:

- Geoff Howells (Australian footballer) (1935–2022), Australian rules footballer
- Geoff Howells (rugby union) (1929–2011), Welsh rugby union player
