= Loughor =

Town in Swansea, Wales

Coordinates: 51.66261°N 4.06461°W

Loughor: Welsh: Casllwchwr
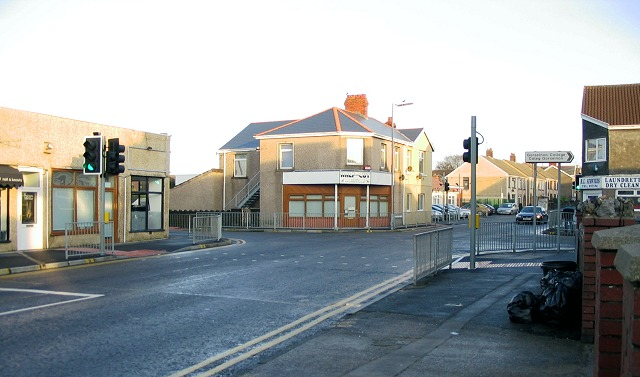

- Location within Swansea
- Population: 4,824 (2011 Census)
- OS grid reference: SS573980
- Principal area: Swansea
- Preserved county: West Glamorgan
- Country: Wales
- Sovereign state: United Kingdom
- Post town: SWANSEA
- Postcode district: SA4
- Dialling code: 01792
- Police: South Wales
- Fire: Mid and West Wales
- Ambulance: Welsh
- UK Parliament: Gŵyr Abertawe
- Senedd Cymru – Welsh Parliament: Gower

Loughor (/ˈlʌxər/; Welsh: Casllwchwr) is a town in Swansea, Wales. Historically in Glamorgan, it lies on the estuary of the River Loughor (Welsh: Afon Llwchwr). The town has a community council under the name Llwchwr. The town is bordered by the communities of Bynea in Carmarthenshire, Grovesend, Gowerton, and Gorseinon. Loughor is part of the built-up area of Gorseinon.

== Etymology ==
The town's name has been called "possibly the oldest name in Gower", dating back to the Roman era. It derives from the name of the Roman fort of Leucarum.

== History ==
The town includes the site of the Roman fort of Leucarum, occupied by Roman Auxiliary soldiers from AD73 to around 320. In 1106 much of South Wales was assigned to an Anglo-Norman lord, Henry de Beaumont, 1st Earl of Warwick, and as part of a castle-building programme he built Loughor Castle, as an earthwork with timber defenses, built into the south-east corner of the Roman ramparts. Over a turbulent 250 years or so the castle was progressively upgraded with stone buildings and curtain walls. The castle later fell into ruin and is now a scheduled monument in the care of Cadw. Meanwhile, Loughor developed around the castle. A medieval Church was established, also within the Roman fort. Rebuilt on the medieval foundations in 1885, St Michael's Church was deconsecrated in 2021.

Loughor Castle

Map of Loughor and its locality

Loughor later grew as a port, although competition from the larger and better-connected ports at Llanelli and Burry Port, meant that Loughor was always a small-scale maritime town. Its position alongside the narrowing of the Loughor Estuary meant it was an important river crossing, originally as a ford at low tide and a ferry when the tide was in. A wooden swing-bridge was built in 1833, when river traffic still used the estuary. The arrival of the Railway in 1852 required the building of Loughor Viaduct, built from wooden trestles by Brunel, also originally featuring a swing-section. The viaduct was replaced by a steel and concrete structure in 2013. A new road bridge of 1923 acknowledged the river was now closed to shipping, and this itself was replaced by the new A484 Loughor bridge in 1988.

Loughor Estuary and Burry Inlet, with vast areas of sandbanks and some of the highest tidal ranges in the world, has always had its share of risks. The town has had its own lifeboat station since 1969, situated near the road bridge. The current lifeboat is a Ribcraft 5.85m RIB.

In the early 20th century the main industries were large tin and steel works, situated on both banks of the estuary. About 1800, John Vivian (1750–1826) of Truro, Cornwall, joined the Cheadle Brasswire Company as managing partner in the copper works at Loughor and Penclawdd. His family would go on to be key industrialists across the Swansea area, running copper-mining, copper-smelting and trading businesses, as Vivian & Sons, throughout the 19th century. At Ysbytty, on the other side of the river, the Spitty copper works of the early 19th century was succeeded by a major iron and tin-plate works which continued into the 1950s. This employed large numbers of both men and women from Loughor, who would cross the estuary each day to get to work.

== Structure and amenities ==
The Old Town Hall

Loughor town can be divided into two areas, defined by the present electoral wards of Lower Loughor and Upper Loughor, which have separate histories. Lower Loughor lies nearer the sea on low ground, Upper Loughor on higher ground. Loughor initially developed around the Norman castle in what is now the Lower Loughor ward. Upper Loughor began as a distinct settlement, initially around what is now the Glebe Road area, and became established as a separate town by the mid-19th century. Loughor today is mostly a commuter town for Swansea and Llanelli via the Loughor bridge, and has merged with the neighbouring town of Gorseinon.

The West Wales line crosses the River Loughor over the Loughor Viaduct to the west of the town. Loughor railway station was closed in 1960.

Local schools in the town include Tre Uchaf Primary School and Casllwchwr Primary School. Opposite the Tre Uchaf Primary is one of the sites of Gower College Swansea.

The local rugby union team of the town is Loughor RFC. The Old Town Hall, built in 1868, is currently disused and boarded up.

== Notable people ==
In birth order:

- Evan Roberts (1878–1951), minister, a major figure in the 1904–1905 Welsh Revival in religious worship
- James Henry Govier (1910–1974), painter, etcher and engraver of the Swansea School, produced several images of Loughor.
- Irma Chilton (1930–1990), children's writer in English and Welsh
- Leighton James (1953-2024), Welsh international footballer

== Sources ==
- Swansea Art Gallery Catalogue, 1936
- The Gower Journal
- Who's Who in Art
- Dictionary of British Artists 1900–1950, by Grant M. Waters, 1975
