= Old Town Hall, Loughor =

Municipal building in Loughor, Wales

The Old Town Hall
- Hen Neuadd y Dref Casllwchwr (Welsh)
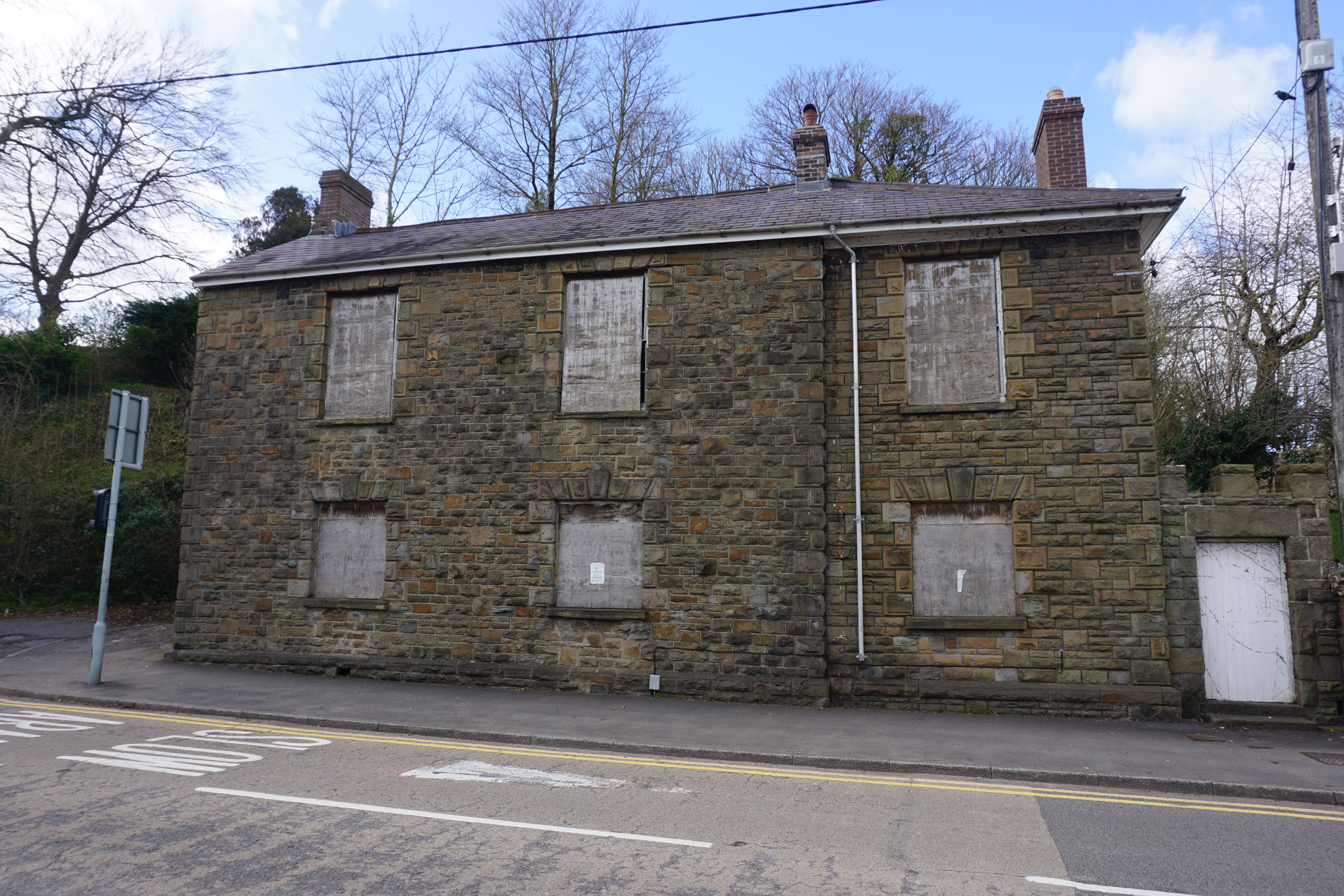
- The building in 2016

- Shown in Swansea
- 51.6631°N 4.0755°W
- Location: Castle street, Loughor

History
- Built: 1868

Site notes
- Architect: Henry Davies
- Architectural style: Neoclassical style

Listed Building – Grade II
- Official name: Old Town Hall
- Designated: 3 July 1976
- Reference no.: 11196

The Old Town Hall (Welsh: Hen Neuadd y Dref Casllwchwr) is a former municipal building in Castle Street in Loughor, a town in Swansea, Wales. The structure, which used to be the meeting place of the local borough council, is a Grade II listed building.

== History ==
Until the mid-19th century, there was no venue for public meetings in the town: meetings of the ancient borough council, which consisted of a portreeve, 12 aldermen and several burgesses, were held in rooms in local inns. The borough council therefore decided to commission a dedicated town hall and to finance it by public subscription. The site the borough leaders selected was opposite Loughor Castle. The new building was designed by Henry Davies of Llanelli in the neoclassical style, built in rubble masonry at a cost of £300 and was completed in 1868.

The original design involved a symmetrical main frontage of two bays facing onto Castle Street. It was fenestrated with casement windows with window sills, voussoirs and keystones on the ground floor and with sash windows in the same style on the first floor. At the west end there was an external staircase leading up to a first-floor porch, formed by a pair of cast iron columns supporting an entablature, and there was a small Diocletian window in the gable above. Internally, there were prison cells and police accommodation on the ground floor, which was accessed through a doorway underneath the external staircase, and there was an assembly room, which was also used for the assizes, on the first floor.

In the late 19th century, the building was extended by one extra bay, slightly set back from the original structure, to the east in the same style. The borough council was abolished under the Municipal Corporations Act 1883. Its assets, including the building, were transferred to a specially-formed entity, the Loughor Town Trust, in 1890.

The building was subsequently used as a community events venue and the Loughor Community Association held its meetings in the town hall until 1935 when the Loughor Community Hall in Woodlands Road was completed. The assembly room on the first floor was subsequently converted for residential use and remained in that use until 2011. After the Loughor Town Trust was unable to secure a new resident, the whole building was then vacated and boarded up. In 2017, the Loughor Town Trust confirmed that it was seeking funding to restore the building, and was considering options including residential, community and business uses.
