= Frank Vickery =

Frank Vickery (26 June 1951 – 19 June 2018) was a Welsh playwright and actor.

== Biography ==
Vickery was born at Blaencwm village, near Treorchy, in the Rhondda, South Wales. His father was a miner. He began his career writing for amateur companies, while working as a bus conductor. In 1989 he took up writing full-time.

He wrote over thirty plays, for both stage and radio, including Family Planning, All's Fair, and Errogenous Zones. He often appeared in his own work, playing characters such as "Teddy" in Granny Annie, and also appeared in pantomime.

One of Vickery's best-known comedies was One O’clock from the House, in which the plot centred around preparations for a funeral. It was performed by many amateur groups. His one-person play, Sleeping with Mickey, was adapted for television in 1994, starring Brenda Blethyn.

In collaboration with Mal Pope, Vickery co-wrote the musical Amazing Grace, which was premièred in 2005 and dealt with the 1904–1905 Welsh revival.
