= Barlow rail =

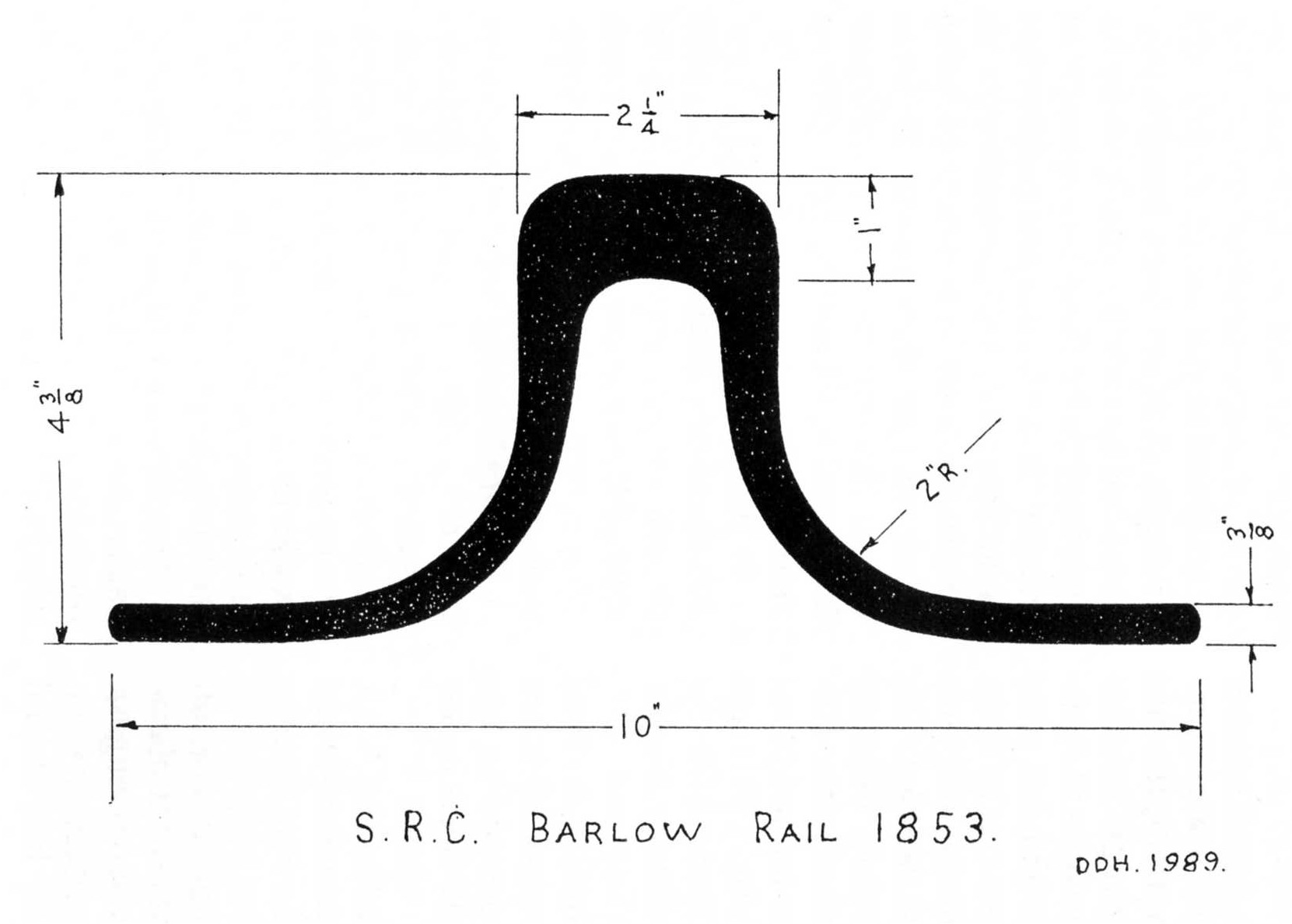
Cross section of Barlow rail as used by Sydney Railway Company

Barlow rail was a rolled rail section used on early railways. It has wide flaring feet and was designed to be laid direct on the ballast, without requiring sleepers. It was widely adopted on lightly trafficked railways, but was ultimately unsuccessful because of maintenance difficulties.

It resembles the bridge rail used for Brunel's baulk road, but was of tapering form, rather than with the flat base of the heavier bridge rail intended for laying onto timber.

== Usage ==
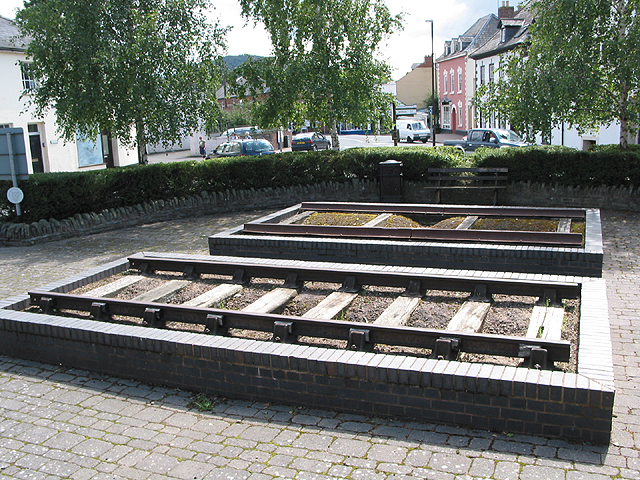
A sample of Barlow rail is shown to the rear of a sample of Bullhead rail

In the mid-nineteenth century, railway networks were expanding into areas where lighter traffic was expected. The first cost of conventional railway track was considerable, and cheaper alternatives were sought. The Barlow rail offered this benefit, by avoiding the cost of sleepers and chairs altogether. Laid directly in the ballast, it required no other ancillary equipment; however the rail itself was significantly heavier and more expensive than conventional rails.

In practice it had several disadvantages; in particular there was no gauge tie, so that if the ballast was poorly consolidated, the rails could gradually move independently, resulting in a serious derailment risk. Some modifications involved the provision of tie bars between opposing rails to maintain the gauge.

The wider and heavier rail section was considerably stiffer to lateral bending, and this made smooth alignment in curves difficult, especially at the joints.

On curves, passing vehicle wheels generate a crabbing effect, tending to push the rails apart, and in the absence of sleepers this tended to rotate the rails outward, that is, they tended to tip outwards.

== Inventor ==
The rail profile was invented in 1849 by W.H.Barlow, engineer of the Midland Railway. The design was patented (12438 of 1849)

On 14 May 1850, he presented a paper to the Institution of Civil Engineers in London detailing his ideas and stating that a test section of 125 lb/yd [62 kg/m] rail on the Midland Junction Railway had proven satisfactory.

He admitted that there had been difficulty in rolling the section but this had been overcome by the manufacturers at Middlesbrough.

== Application ==
The rail section was adopted by Brunel for the South Wales Railway

- The South Wales Railway from Swansea to Carmarthen - 1852. Extended towards Milford Haven in 1854
- New South Wales Railways - 1855 - Sydney to Parramatta. (Some pieces of this rail are on display at the Powerhouse Museum, Sydney with Locomotive No. 1.)
- Geelong and Melbourne Railway Company - 1855 - one order of 300 tons used in tracks near Geelong, Victoria.
- Didcot Railway Centre, Oxfordshire
- In Argentina the Buenos Aires Western Railway in 1857 and the Buenos Aires Great Southern Railway in 1865

== Secondary usage ==
Barlow rail was widely withdrawn from primary service as rails and so large quantities of it were available cheaply. The South Wales Railway offered 400 tons of it for sale in 1857, with free delivery to anywhere along their line.

The large extent of Barlow rail laid in the routes influenced by Brunel, and in New South Wales, has left a legacy of fence posts, and in some cases bridge decks:

- South Devon Railway - underbridge
- Conwy Valley Line - underbridge
- Shipton on Cherwell Halt - fencepost
- Dorrigo Steam Railway and Museum
- Fairford branch - structures
- Clevedon Pier was constructed from second hand Barlow rail.
- Loughor railway viaduct was rebuilt in 1880 and the new decking was constructed of Barlow rail, laid crosswise.

== See also ==
- Rail profile
- Railway track
