= Marie Novello =

Welsh pianist (1884–1928)

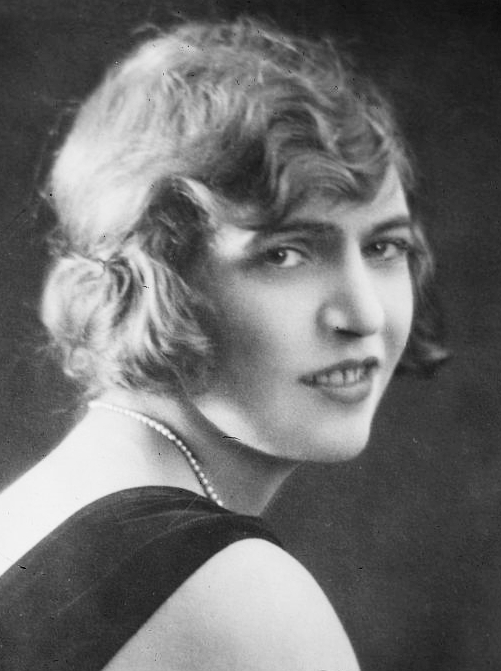
Marie Novello

Marie Novello, also known as Marie Novello Williams (born Maria Williams; 31 March 1884 – 21 June 1928) was a Welsh pianist. She was one of Theodor Leschetizky's last students and performed in public from childhood. Her early death cut short a promising career just as she began to record for one of the major English labels, having already amassed a considerable discography for one of its second-rank competitors.

== Life ==
Marie Novello was born in 1884 as Maria Williams in Maesteg, Glamorgan, the daughter of collier and musician William Thomas Williams and his wife, Anne Bedlington Kirkhouse. She owed the surname "Novello" to adoption by her piano teacher, Clara Novello Davies, mother of Ivor Novello and also a celebrated singing teacher. Following studies with her adoptive mother, Marie was among the last students of Theodor Leschetizky studying with him in Vienna between 1905 and 1907.

Novello's professional career began early. In July 1899, at the age of fifteen, she won the Gold Medal piano prize at the Welsh National Eisteddfod in Cardiff, and she shared piano playing honours with Ferruccio Busoni at the September 1907 Cardiff Triennial Music Festival. In 1908, she toured the English provinces with a company assembled by Percy Harrison, a promoter who regularly organized such groups; among her compatriots were John McCormack, fresh from his first season at the Royal Opera House and participating in a Harrison tour for the first time, and Dame Emma Albani. Around the same time, Novello performed at Wigmore Hall, then known as Bechstein Hall. A year later, in 1909, she made the first of her seven appearances at the Promenade Concerts, when on 22 September she played the Piano Concerto no. 1 in E-flat by Franz Liszt accompanied by the Queen's Hall Orchestra led by Sir Henry Wood.

She repeated that appearance every year until 1914, with two appearances in 1912, always in concerted works accompanied by the same forces. Besides the Liszt concerto, which she reprised in 1910, she performed the same composer's Hungarian Fantasia (1911 and 1912); Mendelssohn's Piano Concerto no. 1 in G minor, Op. 25 (1912); and the Africa Fantasy, Op. 89, of Camille Saint-Saëns (1913 and 1914).

Aside from these festival performances, Novello performed regularly in London, often as one of multiple soloists sharing a recital. In her early twenties, she began appearing at Ballad Concerts and Sunday League Concerts and in music festivals at Brighton and Cardiff.

Novello travelled to the United States in late 1921, arriving on 28 December aboard the White Star Line liner RMS Olympic. On 23 February 1922, she made her New York debut at The Town Hall, where she played a program including works of Chopin, Domenico Scarlatti, Debussy, Selim Palmgren, and Ede Poldini. On 21 January 1923, she made her recital debut in Chicago at the Playhouse under the auspices of F. Wight Neumann.

During this period, she made numerous recordings for the English Edison Bell company. Marie Novello recorded reproducing piano rolls for the Aeolian Company's Duo-Art system; doubtless as a fruit of this connection, she once partnered with a reproducing piano in a public performance of the Variations on a Theme of Beethoven for two pianos, four hands by Saint-Saëns. A few years later, at the dawn of electrical recording, she formed an association with His Master's Voice, but she died when she had recorded only a few sides.

== Death ==
Novello died on 21 June 1928, aged 44, at her home in London from endothelioma of the pharynx and soft palate and was buried in Maesteg Cemetery.

== Repertory and style ==
In her choice of repertory, Novello showed a preference for music of the Romantic era and a particular affinity for virtuoso works such as Liszt's Piano Sonata in B minor. She did not entirely neglect contemporary works, however; she achieved notice for performing the premiere of the Rhapsody on Tipperary for piano and orchestra by Frank Tapp, a composer well represented in English concert halls at the time but now forgotten. She then took the work on tour throughout the United Kingdom.

Critical reception to her work appears to have been mixed, with more than one suggestion that she tended toward impulsiveness and a lack of firm control. Her tone sometimes drew critical disparagement, but critics praised her technical facility and capacity to communicate.

== Recordings ==
Novello evidently had some interest in the mechanical reproduction of sound, as, on 14 June 1924, she participated as a judge in a public competition between gramophones sponsored by The Gramophone magazine. Her fellow judges included Alfred Kalisch, Percy Scholes, Peter Latham, Alec Robertson, and Francis Brett Young. Over the course of the evening, the judges and the audience of 400 marked ballots comparing the performance of some 15 different machines divided into two price classes, nearly all bearing names now long forgotten. She joined her compatriots in unanimous preference for a machine called The Three Muses reproducing the Adagio from Beethoven's Spring Sonata performed by Albert Sammons and William Murdoch; that vote was the sole instance of a unanimous panel, and her other opinions are not recorded. During the interval, the audience was treated to a demonstration of a reproducing piano, but on the Welte-Mignon system, not the Duo Art for which Novello cut a few rolls.

Making her own records almost entirely for Edison Bell, Novello accumulated an extensive discography of acoustic recordings, albeit, as was typical of the time, one weighted heavily to the sort of short works that could fit on one or at most two sides of a 78 RPM record. Her sole multi-disc set was a recording spreading over five sides of Mendelssohn's Op. 25 piano concerto. Her association with His Master's Voice yielded but two issued sides, her sole electrical recordings: a gavotte by Rameau and an Étude de Concert by Arensky.

=== Acoustic 78 RPM ===
Acoustic 78 RPMs issued by Edison Bell:

- Velvet Face (VF) series:
  - No. 529: Ludwig van Beethoven's Moonlight Sonata (first and third movement)
  - Nos. 640–642: Felix Mendelssohn's Concerto no. 1 in G minor for Piano and Orchestra, Op. 25 (with Royal Symphony Orchestra under Joseph Batten), and Rondo Capriccioso, Op. 14
  - No. 676: Carl Tausig's arrangement of Johann Sebastian Bach's Toccata and Fugue in D minor, BWV 565 (two disc sides)
- The Winner series:
  - No. 2340: Cécile Chaminade's Air de Ballet and Benjamin Godard's Mazurka
  - No. 3424: Edvard Grieg's Wedding Day at Troldhaugen (Lyric Pieces Book VIII, Op. 65, No. 6) and Christian Sinding's Frühlingsrauschen, Op. 32, No. 3
  - No. 3443: Franz Liszt's Liebestraum No. 3 and Sergei Rachmaninoff's Prelude in C-sharp minor, Op. 3, No. 2
  - No. 3479: Frédéric Chopin's Etudes, Op. 10, No. 5, in G-flat major (Black Key) and Waltz in C-sharp minor, Op. 64, No. 2
  - No. 3599: Franz Liszt's Hungarian Rhapsody no. 2 (abridged)
  - No. 3609: Beethoven's Incidental Music to The Ruins of Athens, Op. 113, and Turkish March; Ede Poldini's Poupee Valsante; Cyril Scott's Danse Negre, Op. 58, No. 3
  - No. 3768: Cécile Chaminade's 4eme Valse and Pas des Amphores
  - No. 3813: Marche Militaire by Franz Schubert and Toccata by Theodor Leschetizky

=== Electrical 78 RPM ===
Both of the following sides were recorded on 1 March 1927; they appeared coupled as two sides of a single His Master's Voice 10" record, no. B 2592:

- Arensky: 24 Characteristic Pieces, Op. 36, No. 13, Étude de Concert in F-sharp major
- Rameau: Les Boréades, Act IV – Gavottes pour les Heures

=== Reproducing piano rolls ===
Duo Art issued two reproducing rolls cut by Marie Novello:

- Dvořák: Humoresque in G-flat major, Op. 101, No. 7
- Ivor Novello: Gamin

=== Reissues ===
Very few of Novello's recordings, acoustic or electrical, have been reissued since the end of the 78 RPM era.

- The Ivor Novello Duo-Art roll is presently available as a reproduction.
- The His Master's Voice Arensky Etude de Concert appears on Naxos 8.111120, Women at the Piano: An Anthology of Historic Performances, Volume 1 (1926–1952).
- The His Master's Voice Rameau Gavotte and the Edison Bell Leschetitzky Toccata appear on Pearl Opal 9839, Pupils of Leschetitzky.
