= Ivo de Grandmesnil =

Norman magnate (died 1101 or 1102)

Ivo de Grandmesnil (died 1101 or 1102), son of Hugh de Grandmesnil, was a Norman magnate in England and a participant in the First Crusade, in 1096.

Ivo participated in the first crusade in 1096, following Robert Curthose, Duke of Normandy. Ivo became a figure of some derision when, during the Siege of Antioch, he and some of his compatriots (including his brother) panicked, let themselves over the city walls by rope, and fled back home.

After the death of his father in 1098, Ivo inherited the town and castle of Leicester and additional estates, assuming the title of Sheriff of Leicester.

Ivo was among the barons supporting the claims of Robert Curthose against his brother Henry I in 1100.

In 1102, after the attempt to put Curthose on the English throne had failed, Ivo was severely fined by King Henry I for waging private war against his neighbours. He sought the help of Robert de Beaumont, who agreed to help Ivo return to the king's favour, and took a mortgage of Ivo's lands for fifteen years in return for a large sum which Ivo would use to go back to the Holy Land. In addition, Robert agreed to eventually marry the infant daughter of his brother Henry de Beaumont, 1st Earl of Warwick to Ivo's young son, and to return the mortgaged lands to the son. [Note: some sources say that it was Robert's infant daughter that was promised since his brother is not known to have any daughters.]

Ivo de Grandmesnil and his wife died on pilgrimage in 1101 or 1102, but Robert de Beaumont retained control of his estates even after the end of the fifteen years, dispossessing Ivo's sons, Ivo II and William. Deathbed attempts to induce him to return them were unavailing. Two years later, Henry I made plans to return the lands to the sons, who were probably serving in the king's household, but both died in the shipwreck of the White Ship in 1120.
