= Geoff Howells (rugby union) =

Welsh international rugby union player

- Full name: William Geoffrey Howells
- Born: 29 October 1929 Loughor, Wales
- Died: 12 January 2011 (aged 81) Swansea, Wales

Rugby union career
- Position: Wing
International career
Years	Team	Apps	(Points)
1957	Wales	4	(3)

William Geoffrey Howells (29 October 1929 — 12 January 2011) was a Welsh international rugby union player.

A steel worker from Loughor, Howells was the son of Swansea rugby player Mac Howells.

Howells was a Llanelli wing three-quarter, capped four times for Wales in the 1957 Five Nations. He earned his call up after scoring a hat-trick of tries for the Possibles in the Welsh trials. Wales games record holder Ken Jones was dropped to accommodate Howells on the right wing for their tournament opener against England. He was switched to the left wing when Jones was recalled for the next match at Murrayfield and for the final fixture in Paris he scored a try to help Wales defeat France. In 1959, Howells announced his retirement from top class rugby.

== See also ==
- List of Wales national rugby union players
