= Loughor Viaduct =

Bridge over River Loughor, south Wales

Coordinates: 51.6624°N 4.0827°W

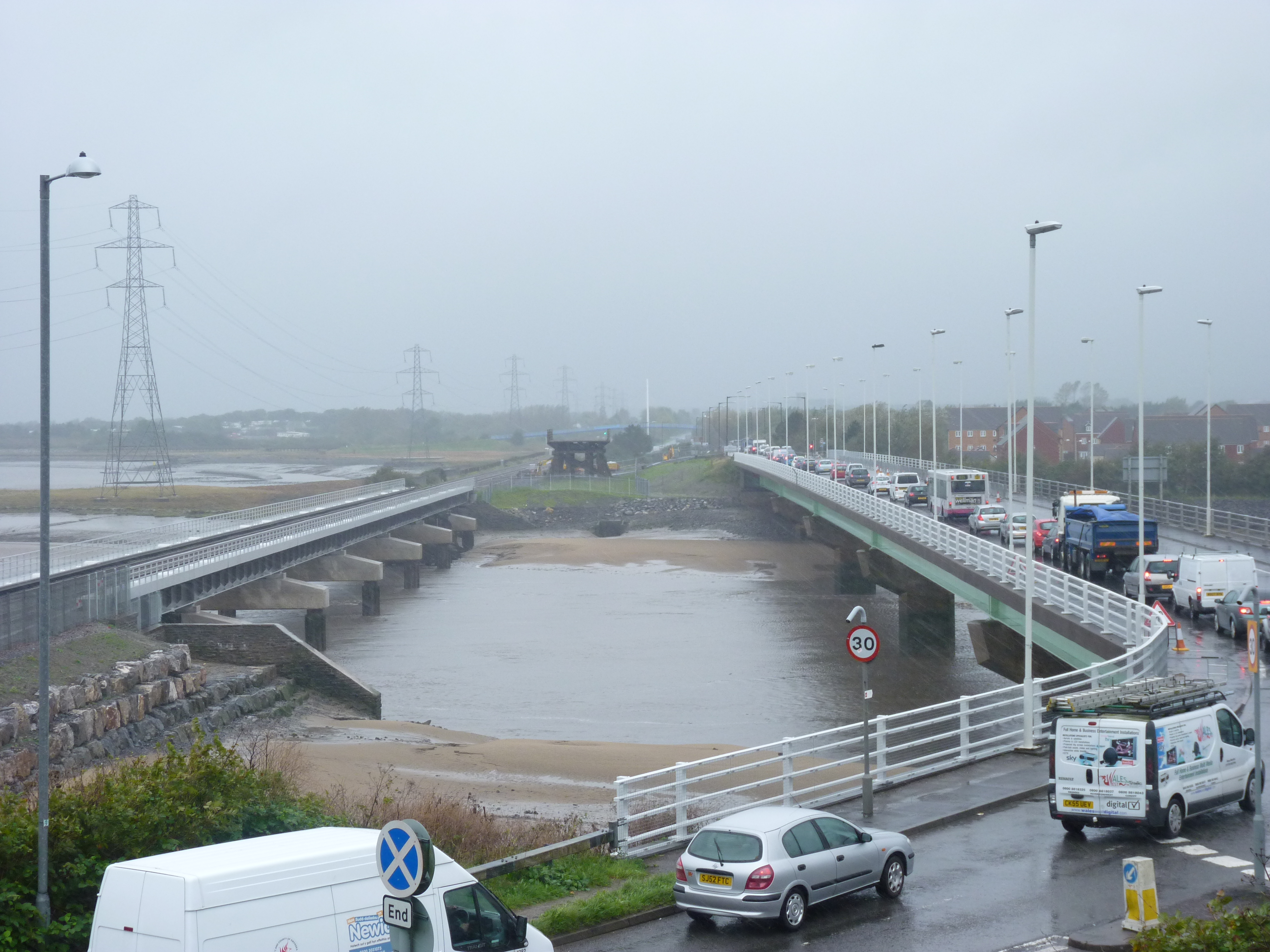
Railway viaduct of 2013, left, alongside the road bridge across the Loughor Estuary

The Loughor railway viaduct carries the West Wales Line across the River Loughor. It is adjacent, and runs parallel to, the Loughor road bridge. The 1880 viaduct was granted Grade II listed building status. Before it was demolished in early 2013, the viaduct was the last remaining timber viaduct designed by Isambard Kingdom Brunel.

The Loughor viaduct was constructed to carry the broad gauge South Wales Railway (SWR) west of Swansea to Carmarthen. It was opened to traffic (broad gauge and standard gauge) in 1852. The viaduct was rebuilt several times; modifications made include the removal of its swing bridge and broad gauge tracks, replacement of the timber deck with an iron structure, and additional piles. In 1986, due to structural concerns, the track was singled and speed restrictions were imposed adding to journey times.

In the early 2010s, Network Rail commissioned a new-build replacement. Work by contractor Carillion, took place during March and April 2013. The railway was closed for 16 days to allow for the removal of the old viaduct and the installation of the new bridge. On 8 April 2013, the new bridge with its doubled track line was opened to traffic. A section of the original viaduct was preserved alongside the new structure.

== History ==
=== Original construction ===
The South Wales Railway Act 1845 (8 & 9 Vict. c. cxc) received royal assent and the South Wales Railway (SWR) began construction of the line. It required the construction of a viaduct over the River Loughor which was designed by Isambard Kingdom Brunel. Lavington Evans Fletcher, Brunel's assistant and the resident engineer, designed the movement mechanism for the swing bridge.

According to Isambard Brunel Junior, the viaduct was typical of his father's numerous viaducts, especially those that were built on coastal lines for the SWR. It had seventeen fixed spans of similar size and was built of timber. It was 750 ft long. To prevent river traffic being obstructed, the viaduct had a 40 ft opening swing bridge at the Swansea (east) end. As constructed, it was supported on timber piles driven 14 feet into the sand and clay bed of the river. The piles were arranged in groups of three, across the width of the viaduct. Above them, a timber deck was laid to carry a double track; the deck rested on timber baulks.

On 17 September 1852, the first train crossed the viaduct; regular services commenced on 11 October 1852. The delay in its opening has been attributed to a shortage of Barlow rails for the permanent way. The tracks on the viaduct were laid as mixed-gauge track, broad gauge for use by the SWR and standard gauge for the Llanelly Railway. During May 1872, the SWR transitioned to standard gauge, and the broad gauge tracks were redundant.

=== 1880 rebuilding ===
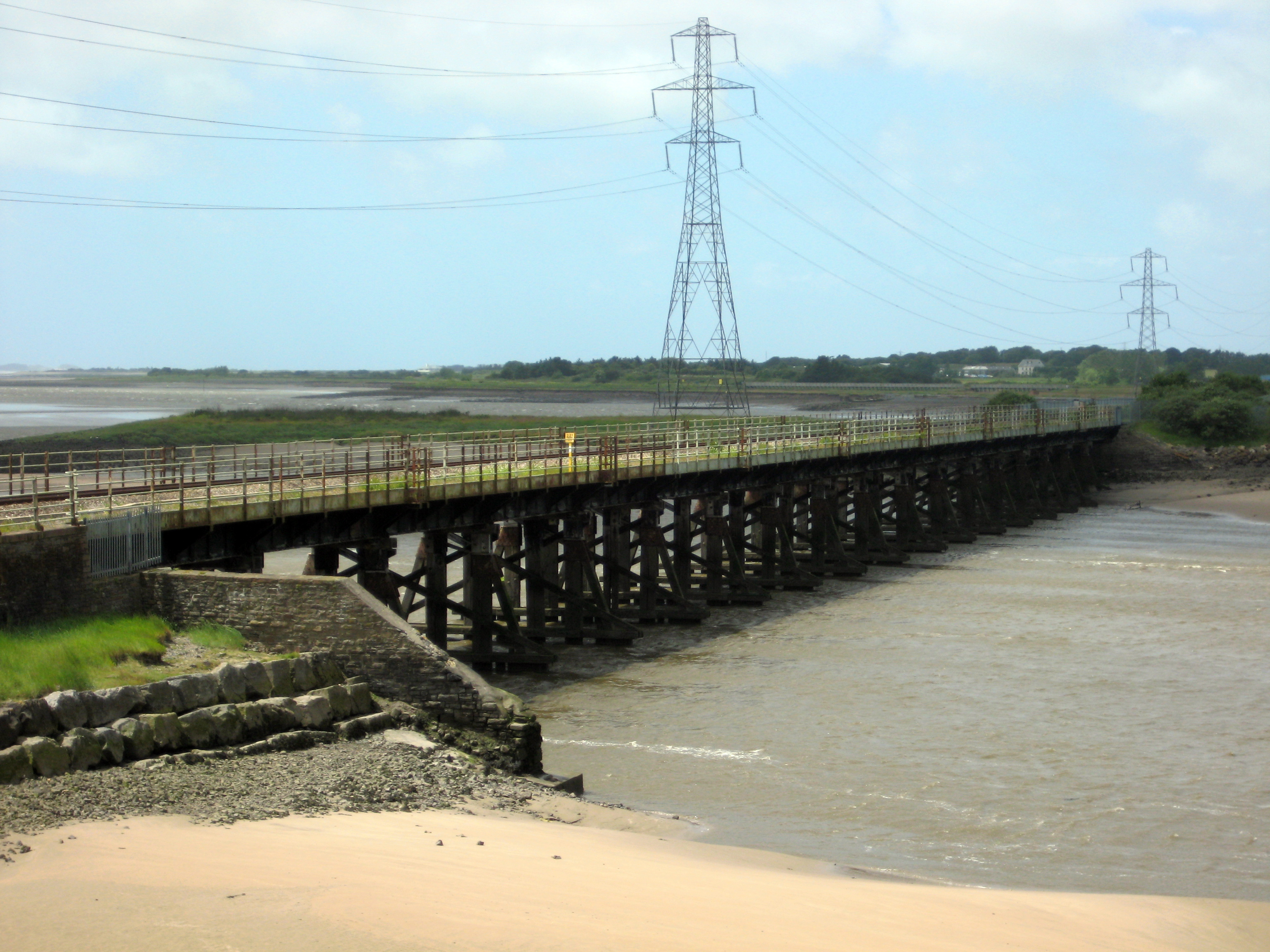
Loughor railway viaduct, the pre-2013 bridge

During 1880, the viaduct was rebuilt. The original piles were either retained or strengthened using wrought iron fixtures. A new iron deck replaced the timber deck. To support it, three longitudinal wrought iron H-girders were laid along viaduct. The deck was constructed of surplus Barlow rails, which were laid widthways. As the SWR having had converted to standard gauge during 1872, the tracks were re-laid as a standard gauge baulk road.

Barlow rail was widely used for civil engineering tasks, including Clevedon Pier but it became apparent that lightweight bridge rail was too light for prolonged use and tended to spread, leading to inaccurate gauge and risk of derailments. Large quantities were available cheaply. The SWR offered 400 tons of Barlow rail for sale in 1857, with free delivery anywhere along the line.

=== 1909 rebuilding ===
Between 1908 and 1909, a major rebuild was carried out. The original piers were replaced, cut off at the lower waling level and new timber piles driven alongside. The configuration of piers was changed from a three-pile arrangement to four-pile. The deck supports were changed, longitudinal wrought iron girders were replaced with deeper steel plate. The swing bridge, which was last used during 1887 was removed and replaced by a fixed girder.

=== 1979–1981 refurbishment ===
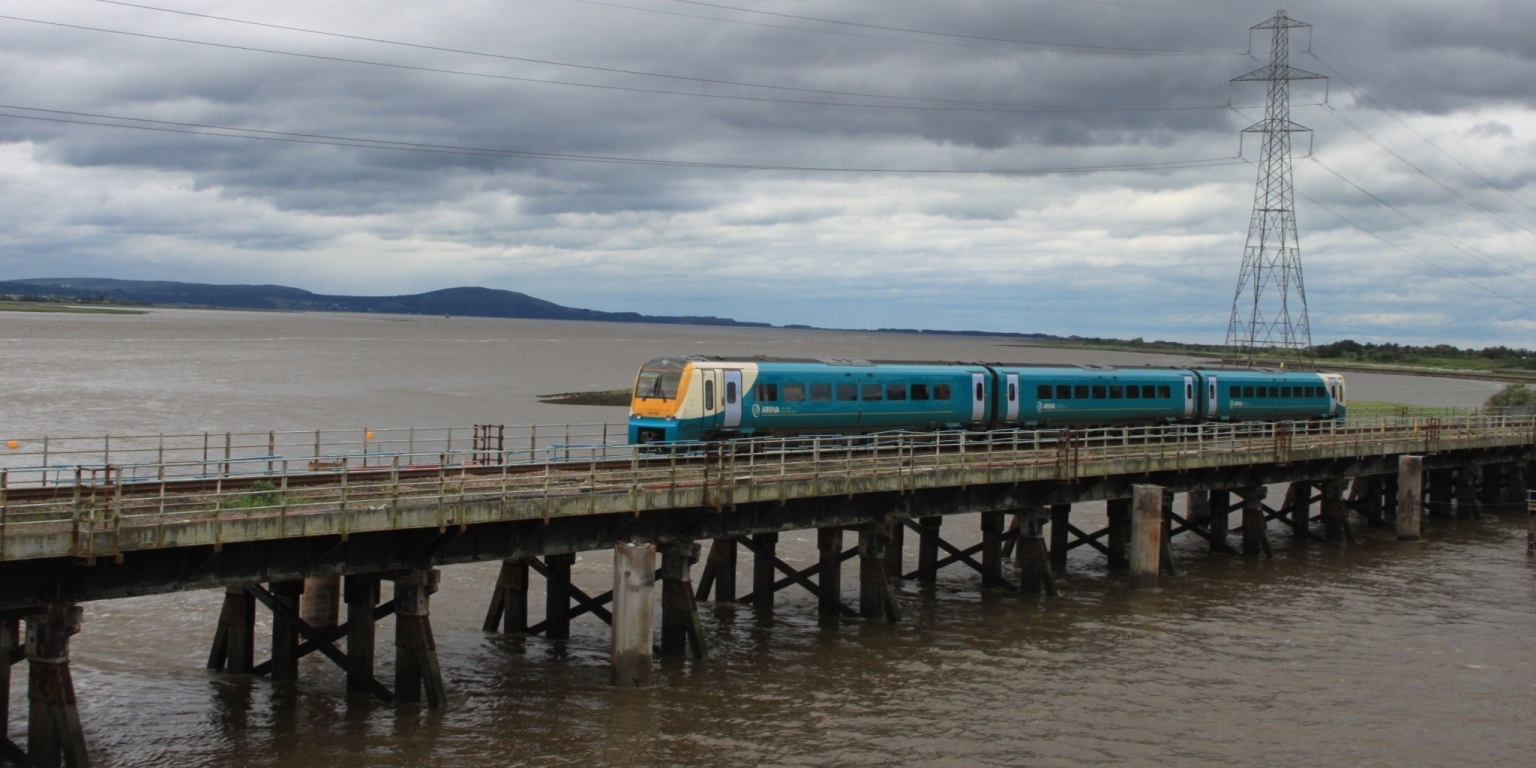
An Arriva Trains Wales British Rail Class 175 crossing over the Loughor viaduct

Between 1979 and 1981, the viaduct underwent an extensive refurbishment programme. It was overseen by the civil engineer Christopher Loudon Wallis and described as being 'sympathetic' to the original structure, retaining a large proportion of its original timber.

It was discovered that the river bed beneath the viaduct had been severely eroded necessitating the addition of tipping stones to protect the timber. In 1986 the viaduct was limited to single-track operation as a consequence of concerns over its structural safety by British Rail. Freight and passenger trains were subject to speed restrictions, which led to delays and longer journey times.

In October 1998, the Loughor Viaduct was listed and awarded Grade II status. The 1880 viaduct was the only remaining viaduct designed by Brunel that relied upon timber for a substantial proportion of its structure until its replacement during 2013.

=== 2013 replacement ===
The viaduct is on a five-mile section of railway between Cockett and Duffryn, which was reduced from double to single track operation during 1986. During 2012 and 2013, work to re-double the section allowed an increase in train services over this stretch of line. Network Rail also commissioned a replacement for the Loughor Viaduct by a new bridge. By this point, the viaduct was unable to take the weight of two trains at once limiting its operational use.

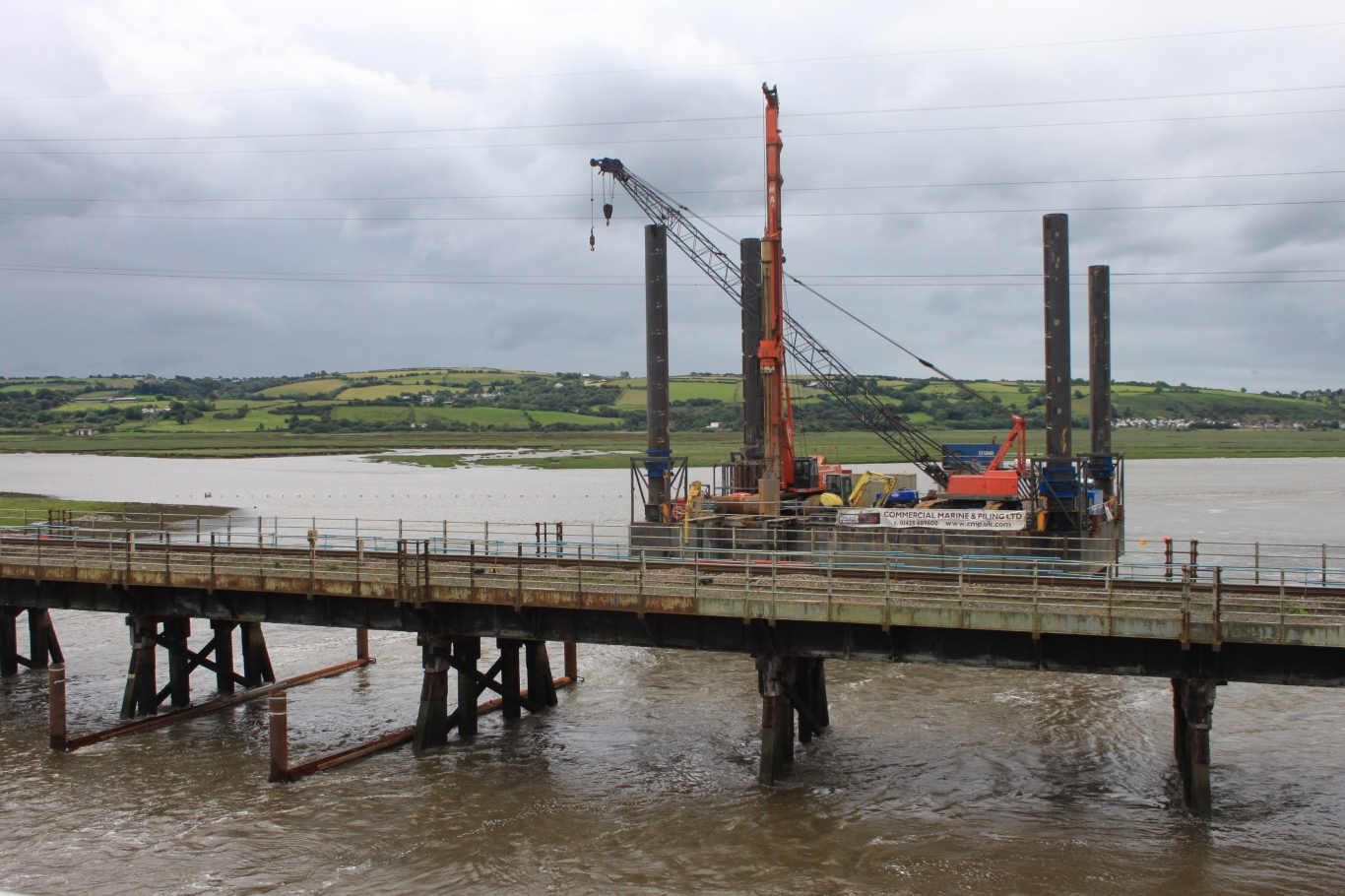
Foundations being piled for the new bridge, July 2012

Carillion was awarded the contract for the new bridge, and consulting engineers, Tony Gee & Partners designed it. The bridge is a 235 meters long, seven-span steel and concrete structure. The deck is a shallow slab, supported by deeper main girders, allowing the level to match its predecessor. The completed deck has a topping of reinforced concrete, waterproofing measures and ballast. During construction the track was temporarily covered with rubber mats so that construction vehicles did not damage the track.

The replacement bridge had to address operational, heritage and environmental concerns which influenced the methods of construction and other decisions. The bridge was built adjacent to the viaduct which remained in use. Once completed, the new bridge was slid sideways into position using hydraulic jacks over 14 hours after the viaduct had been speedily demolished. This meant that the railway was closed for just 16 days. Work started on the bridge on 24 March 2013 and it was officially completed in early April 2013. On 8 April 2013, the new viaduct doubled tracks was opened to traffic.

As the old viaduct had been Grade II listed, efforts to preserve it for historical reasons were integrated into the replacement plan. A section of the old structure were relocated onto adjacent railway land to the west of the new viaduct. A few elements were incorporated into the new bridge such as a single span of the original substructure at the Llanelli (west) end, and the original abutments were reused. On 13 June 2013, the Loughor Rail Viaduct replacement programme was commended at the CIHT Sustainability Awards. On 1 July 2014, industry publication New Civil Engineer announced that the new bridge had been awarded the Institute of Civil Engineers Wales Cymru George Gibby Award.

== See also ==
- List of bridges in Wales
