= Evan Roberts (minister) =

Welsh evangelist (1878–1951)

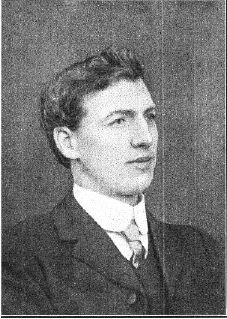
Evan Roberts in 1905

Evan John Roberts (8 June 1878 – 29 January 1951) was a Welsh preacher and a leading figure of the 1904–1905 Welsh revival.

His obituary in The Western Mail summed up his career thus:

He was a man who had experienced strange things. In his youth, he had seemed to hold the nation in the palms of his hands. He endured strains and underwent great changes of opinion and outlook, but his religious convictions remained firm to the end.

== Early life ==
Born in Loughor, Wales, Evan Roberts was one of three sons and five daughters born to Henry and Hannah Roberts. Raised in a Calvinistic Methodist home, he was a devoted child who attended church regularly and memorised scripture at night. From the ages of 11 to 23, he worked in the coal mines with his father. Roberts then spent time working for his uncle as a blacksmith's apprentice in Pontarddulais. Roberts was known as a young man who spent many hours praying each week both personally and at group prayer meetings.

His involvement in the Welsh revival followed a period of religious awakening across the region. He reported having experienced visitations from the Holy Spirit depicting "all Wales being lifted up to Heaven," at one time asking his roommate (and later brother-in-law) if he believed that God could then "give us 100,000 souls." The numbers of conversions were chronicled daily in the Western Mail, the national newspaper of Wales.

== Ministry ==
In 1904, Roberts began studying for the ministry at Newcastle Emlyn. Attendance at a service held by evangelist Seth Joshua in Blaenannerch, Cardiganshire led to an experience that formed Roberts' belief in the "Baptism of the Spirit". In October of that year, he began speaking at a series of small meetings. These appearances led to his involvement in the revival. He was soon attracting congregations numbering thousands. Within two weeks the Welsh revival was national news and Roberts, his brother Dan, and his friend Sidney Evans began travelling the country conducting revival meetings.

The four points of his message were:

- Confess all known sin, receiving forgiveness through Jesus Christ
- Remove anything in your life that you are in doubt or feel unsure about
- Be ready to obey the Holy Spirit instantly
- Publicly confess the Lord Jesus Christ

Meetings lasted hours but from the beginning there was a sense of conviction of sin. Wrongdoing was confessed and lifestyles were affected. The pubs went from full to empty.

Prayer meetings gathered huge crowds. In Trecynon, Roberts would walk from one packed church to another. One of the stories told is of the pit-ponies not understanding the miners' commands as their language was cleaned up.

Annie M. Rees from Gorseinon was one of Roberts' original singers and she was joined by May John who was a professional singer. They assisted Roberts but they began to lead revival meetings themselves. May was to go on to organise services in Bristol.

In June 1905 he preached to 6,000 people at Rhosneigr in the open air. He was assisted by a wooden platform and the singer and preacher May John.

== Collapse ==
Roberts succumbed to the pressure of his rigorous schedule, and, in 1906, suffered a physical and emotional collapse. He retained his faith though he suffered from depression. He found some solace in writing poetry. In keeping with Roberts’ statements and beliefs, the most plausible theory for his isolation and seclusion may be that he grew concerned that his unsought celebrity status was attracting people to his meetings for the wrong reasons, and he desired that God, not himself, be glorified. A number of letters reflect that he retained his faith. He developed a discipline to his life as he turned to prayer as his main ministry.

Writing in 1909, the Rev. J.V. Morgan commented, "Since the [1905] revival, various Socialistic organizations have invaded the valleys and are gathering Welsh working men by the thousands to hear the 'socialistic gospel'. These men have already reverted to the belief that their salvation is not to come by way of the pulpit, or by the way of the churches, but by the way of the Labour Party."

== Later life ==
Though a Welsh speaker, Roberts convalesced in England, at the home of Jessie Penn-Lewis. He lived in Brighton for some years from 1921. People longed for him to return to Wales, but he became convinced that the work of intercession was vital. He gave himself to prayer and believed that he reached more this way. There are accounts of how he continued the mission especially on his knees and with his publications (co-authored with Penn-Lewis) that encouraged the missionary growth of the 20th century. Some felt hurt that he had somehow abandoned Wales. Penn-Lewis, an evangelist, tried to convince Roberts that some of the signs and wonders that occurred during the revival were not of God. Accusations of his having no theological or ministry training may have hindered his ability to stay on track amidst a clamour for his time.

Around 1926, one of the former members of Roberts' team arranged meetings for him at Loughor, where the revival began. Not only were people converted to a faith in Christ, but there were "signs" following his preaching, including healing the sick and casting out demons. This characterised each of his rare public appearances in later years. When he was asked to pray at his father's funeral in 1928, witnesses said his prayer was an electric-like force, so great, in fact, that they thought revival would break out again.

== Death ==
Roberts lived out his last years in Cardiff and died in relative obscurity in 1951, aged 72. He was buried in a family plot behind Moriah Chapel in Loughor. A memorial column commemorates his contribution to the revival.

== Works ==
- War on The Saints, Diggory Press, ISBN 1-905363-01-X

== In popular culture ==
- While writing his 1907 dystopian novel Lord of the World, Roman Catholic priest Monsignor Robert Hugh Benson drew upon Evan Roberts and the 1904–1905 Welsh Revival as models for the reign of the Anti-Christ.
- The story of Evan Roberts and his role in the 1904–1905 Welsh Revival was adapted into a stage musical by Mal Pope called Amazing Grace in 2005.

== Sources ==
- Invasion of Wales by the Spirit Through Evan Roberts, James A. Stewart, Revival Literature, 1963.
- God's Generals, Roberts Liardon, Whitaker House, 1996.
- Holding Forth the Word of Life, Heath Church, 2000
- Instrument of Revival, Brynmor P. Jones, Logos, 1995
- National Library of Wales, Sir John Herbert Lewis Papers
