= Loughor bridge =

Road bridge in Wales

Coordinates: 51.6628°N 4.0822°W

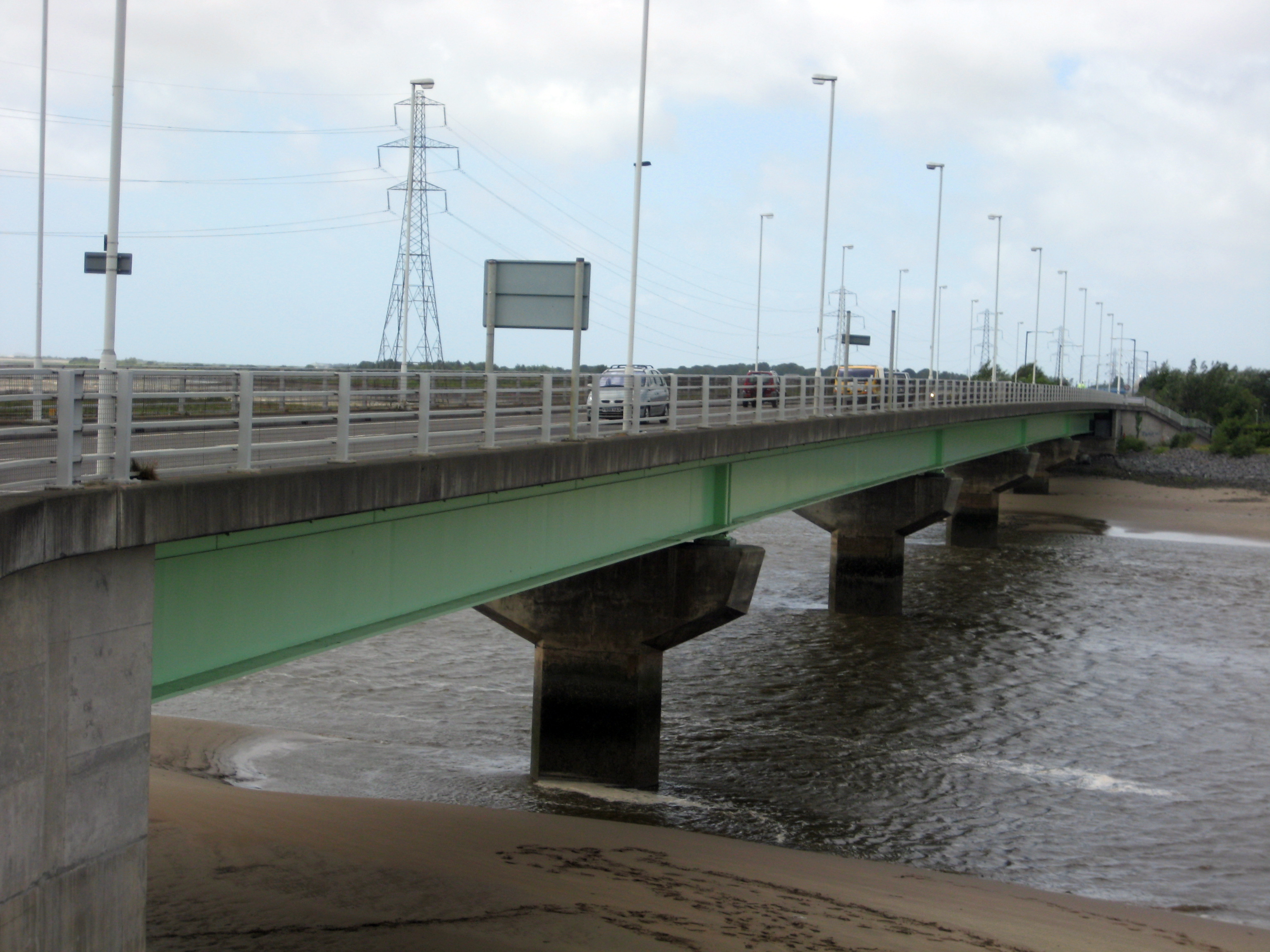
Loughor bridge from Lower Loughor

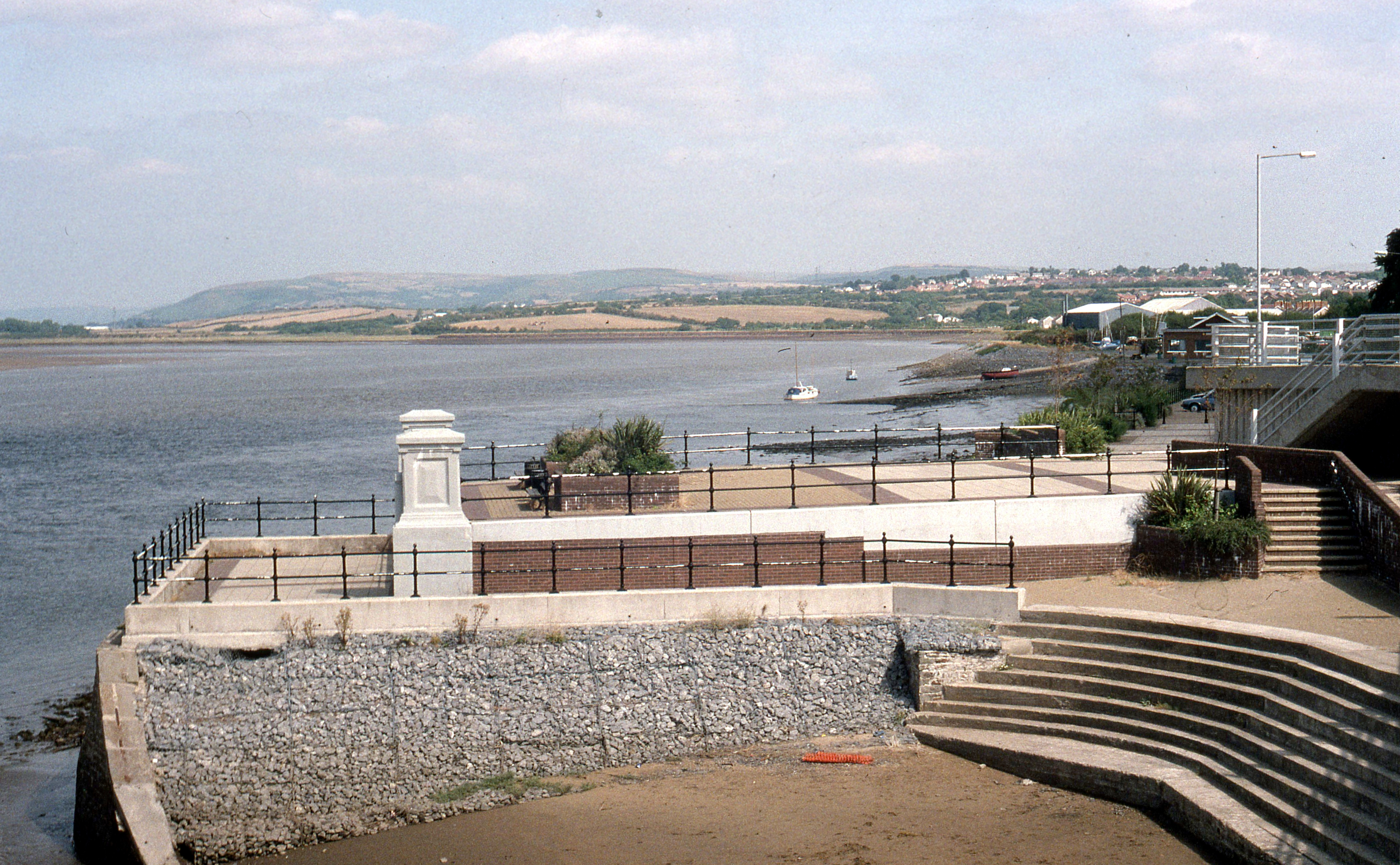
Remnants of the old Loughor Bridge

The Loughor bridge is a road crossing over the River Loughor, providing a convenient link between Loughor, Gorseinon, and Swansea on the east side and Llanelli and south Carmarthenshire to the west. The bridge is part of the A484 road. The road bridge is adjacent to the Loughor railway viaduct and was built by the then Dyfed and West Glamorgan county councils in 1988 with John Laing Group as the principal contractor.

== History ==
Before a bridge was built here, the nearest bridge crossing was at Pontarddulais, some 5 miles upstream. However, the river could be forded at low tide, and a ferry operated when conditions allowed. There are no visible indications of a ford, but it is believed this had been used since Roman times. In 1833, a wooden swing bridge was constructed to allow wheeled vehicles to cross but still enable river traffic to gain access to wharves within the estuary. The bridge was joined by the railway viaduct, built by Brunel in 1852, which also featured a swing section, although the estuary was progressively less used by shipping. A fixed replacement road bridge was constructed in concrete in 1923. Evidence of the old bridge can still be seen from the right side of the new bridge crossing from Loughor. A parapet jutting out into the river, which is now a seating area and support, foundations can also be seen in the riverbed at low tides. However, the concrete construction was not sufficient to sustain heavy traffic, and as part of a major improvement scheme for the A484, the new bridge, with concrete piers and steel spans, was completed in 1988.

The wooden trestle rail viaduct, much reworked since 1852, had also been severely hampered by structural issues and, from 1986, had been limited to a single track. It was finally replaced by a new steel bridge in 2013, along the same line as previously, allowing two-way full-speed rail travel, running parallel to the new road bridge.

Map showing Loughor with the position of the various river crossings

== Topography ==
If travelling over the bridge east, you will enter the county of Swansea and South Wales when leaving the bridge. If travelling west, you will enter the county of Carmarthenshire and the West Wales area when leaving the bridge.

When leaving the bridge, heading west, the road signs change from English/Welsh to Welsh/English (Welsh written before English). This is due to the much higher use of the Welsh language in West Wales.
