= Henry de Beaumont, 1st Earl of Warwick =

12th-century Anglo-Norman nobleman

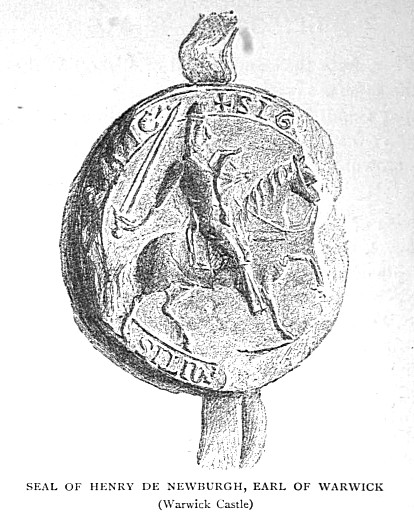
Seal of Henry de Beaumont, 1st Earl of Warwick (J. Harvey Bloom)

Henry de Beaumont, 1st Earl of Warwick or Henry de Newburgh (died 20 June 1119) was a Norman nobleman who rose to great prominence in the Kingdom of England.

== Origins ==
Henry was a younger son of Roger de Beaumont by Adeline of Meulan, daughter of Waleran III, Count of Meulan, and Oda de Conteville.

== Early career ==
Henry was given by his father the modest lordship of Le Neubourg, in central Normandy, 12 km (7.5 mi) to the northeast of his father's caput of Beaumont-le-Roger on the River Risle. From this lordship he adopted for himself and his descendants the surname Anglicised to "de Newburgh", frequently Latinised to de Novo Burgo (meaning "from the new borough/town").

Henry was said, by Orderic Vitalis the Norman monk historian, to have been with William the Conqueror on his 1068 campaign in the Midlands when he was supposedly given charge of Warwick Castle, but there is no supporting evidence for this late source. Little is in fact known of his career before 1088. However, he took a leading role in reconciling the Conqueror with his eldest son Robert Curthose in 1081, so he stood high in the Conqueror's favour. In 1088 he was a royal agent in the arrest and trial of the traitorous bishop of Durham, William de Saint-Calais.

== Under William II ==
Henry acquired a much greater land-holding in England when, in reward for help in suppressing the Rebellion of 1088, King William II made him Earl of Warwick in 1088. The lands of the earldom were put together from several sources. The bulk was provided by the majority of the lands in Warwickshire and elsewhere recorded as those of his elder brother Robert, Count of Meulan in the Domesday Survey of 1086. He also received large royal estates in Rutland and the royal forest of Sutton, which became Sutton Chase. The complicated arrangement to endow his earldom is unprecedented, and must have been the result of a three way arrangement between his father, his brother and the king.

== Under Henry I ==
Henry became the companion and friend of King Henry I, William II's successor. When a division took place among the barons who had gathered together in the aftermath of the king's sudden death in 1100 to choose a successor, it was mainly owing to de Beaumont's advice that Henry, the conqueror's fourth son, was selected. However, in the following year most of the barons were openly or secretly disloyal and favoured the attempt of Henry's elder brother Robert Curthose, now Duke of Normandy, to gain the Crown. Henry de Beaumont and his brother Robert, King Henry's foremost advisors, were among the few that remained faithful to the King.

From around this time, Henry became an important figure in the Norman invasion of Wales, gaining the Lordship of Gower in 1106 or 1107 after the murder of Hywel ap Goronwy, the last Welsh lord of Gŵyr. Henry or his barons built or reoccupied a number of castles at Swansea, Penrhys, Llanrhidian, Oystermouth and Loughor.

== Marriage and issue ==
Before 1100 Henry married Margaret (died after 1156), daughter of Geoffrey II of Perche and Beatrix of Montdidier, daughter of Hilduin IV, Count of Montdidier. They had two daughters and the following sons:

1. Roger, 2nd Earl of Warwick (c. 1102 – 1153), who succeeded Henry
2. Robert de Neubourg (died 1159), who inherited barony of Annebecq
3. Rotrou (died 1183), who was successively Bishop of Évreux and Archbishop of Rouen, Chief Justiciar and Steward of Normandy. In 1167 he led the funeral service of Empress Matilda, daughter of Henry I and mother of Henry II.
4. Geoffrey de Neubourg. He moved to England at the end of 1137 and resided thereafter with his eldest brother Earl Roger of Warwick. He made a number of appearances in Earl Roger's charters as "Geoffrey the earl's brother." When Roger died in 1153 and was succeeded by his son, Earl William, "Geoffrey the earl's uncle" continued to live in the Warwick household. He appears as a ducal justice in Normandy in his later years. See Haskins Society Journal 13 (2004): 50.
5. Henry de Neubourg, otherwise known as "Henry of Gower". He re-conquered the family's Welsh estates in around 1136, holding the lordship of Gower throughout the reign of King Stephen.

== Death and legacy ==
Henry entered the Abbey of Saint-Pierre de Préaux before his death and died as a monk there on 20 June 1119. An eighteenth-century woodcut of his tomb in the chapter house, with those of his brother and father beside him, survives, though the abbey is long ruined.

== See also ==
- Ivo de Grandmesnil

== Sources ==
- Crouch, David "The Local Influence of the Earls of Warwick, 1088–1242: A Study in Decline and Resourcefulness", Midland History, xxi (1996), 1–23.
- Le Patourel, John F. (1984). Feudal Empires. Bloomsbury Publishing.
- Owen, Dorothy M. (1980). "Magnates, Curiales and the Wheel of Fortune". In Brown, R. Allen (ed.). Proceedings of the Battle Conference 1979. Boydell Press.
- Thompson, Kathleen (2002). Power and Border Lordship in Medieval France: The County of the Perche, 1000–1226. Boydell Press.

Peerage of England
| New creation | Earl of Warwick; 1st creation 1088–1119 | Succeeded by Roger de Beaumont |
