= Clara Novello Davies =

Welsh singer, teacher and conductor

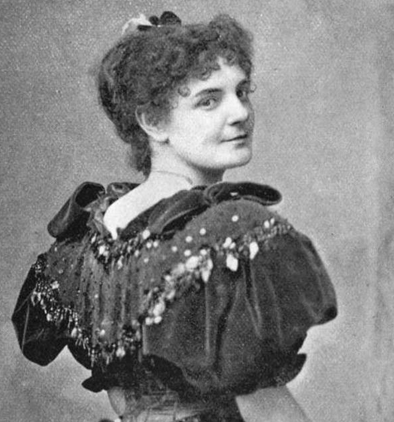
- Clara Novello Davies
- Born: Clara Novello Davies; 7 April 1861; Cardiff, Wales
- Died: 7 February 1943 (aged 81); London, England
- Other name: Pencerddes Morgannwg
- Children: Ivor Novello; Marie Novello

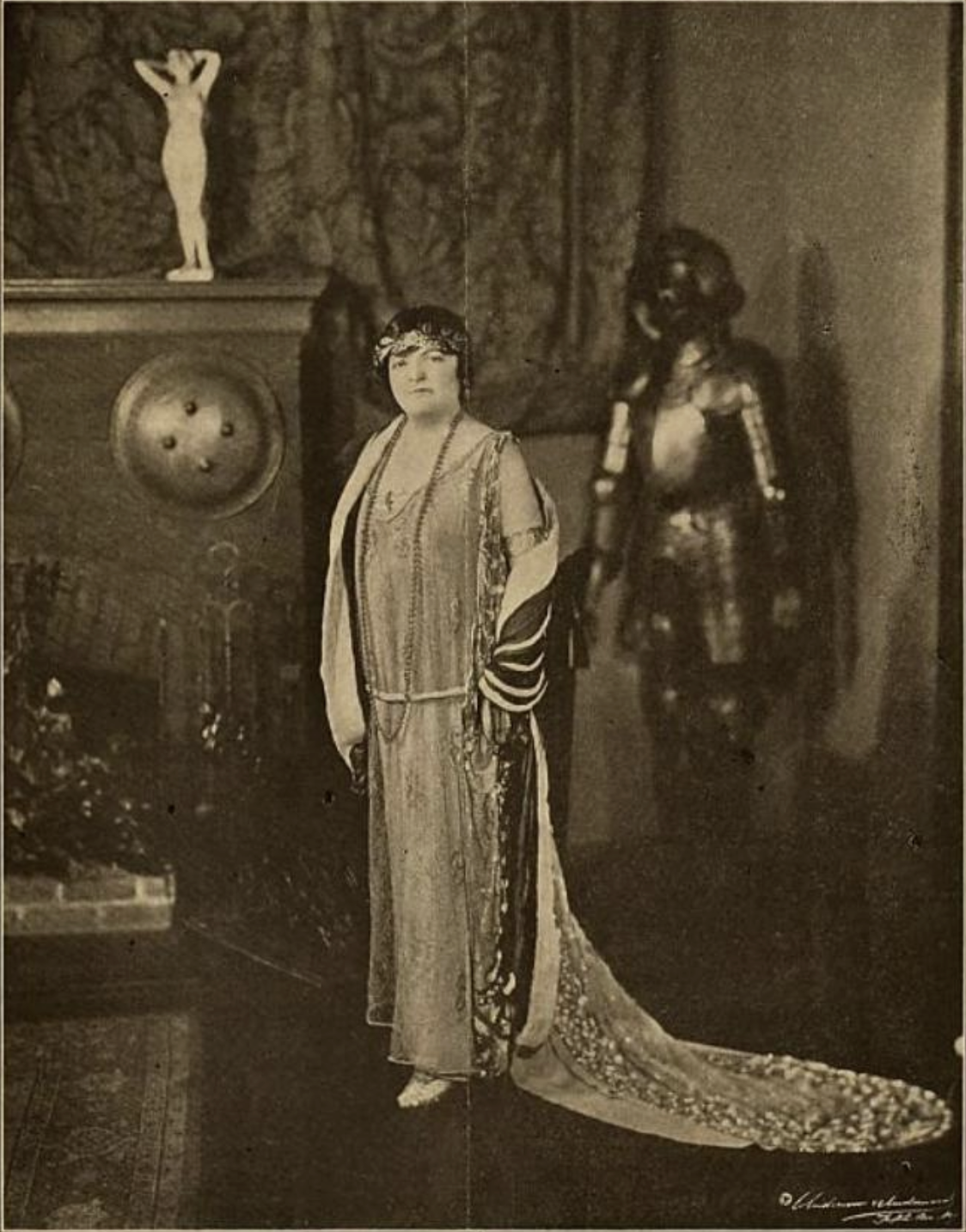
Davies in 1925

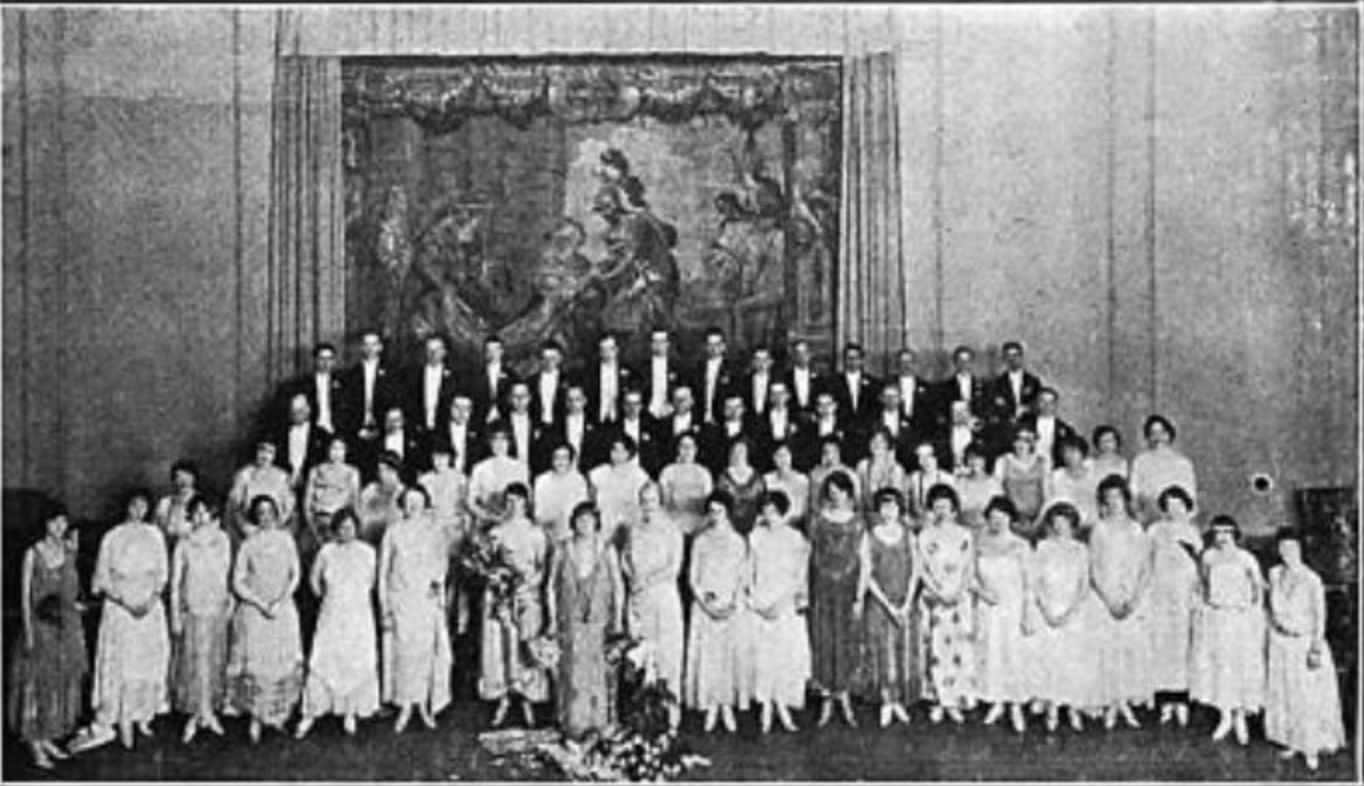
Clara Novello-Davies Artist Choir (1924)

Clara Novello Davies (7 April 1861 – 7 February 1943) was a Welsh singer, teacher, composer, and conductor. She used the pen name Pencerddes Morgannwg.

== Early life ==
Clara Novello Davies was born on 7 April 1861. She was named after Clara Novello, a famous soprano (1818–1908). Her father, leader of the church choir, taught her to play the harmonium. She also studied music with Charles Williams of the Llandaff Cathedral.

== Career ==
Davies was an accompanist for the Cardiff United Choir and Cardiff Blue Ribbon Choir as a young woman. In 1883, she founded and conducted the Royal Welsh Ladies' Choir.

In 1893, two of her students, May John and Elsie Drinkwater, won a prize at the National Eisteddfod in Pontypridd singing 'Quis est homo?' from Rossini's Stabat Mater. This led to an invitation for her choir to attend the World's Columbian Exposition in Chicago that year. At the Exposition, May John took the prize for best soprano. The choir also sang at the Paris Exposition (1900).

Davies was still conducting into her seventies when her New York-based Novello Davies Artist Choir was invited to the 1937 Paris Exposition. The choir raised funds for charity during both World Wars.

Clara Novello Davies published an instructional book, You Can Sing (1928), and a memoir, The Life I Have Loved (1940). She also wrote songs, including "Friend!" (1905) and "Mother!" (1911). She was awarded the Médaille de Mérite by the French government in 1937. Among her voice students were American actress Dorothy Dickson, baritone Louis Graveure, and opera singer Mary Ellis.

== Personal life and death ==
Clara Novello married David Davies, a solicitor's clerk, on 31 October 1883. Their son, David Ivor Davies, became better known as Ivor Novello, the actor, composer, dramatist and director. Their adopted daughter, who was born Maria Williams but took the name Marie Novello, was a concert pianist who died from throat cancer on 21 June 1928, aged 44. Clara Novello Davies was widowed in 1931, and died in London in 1943, aged 81. She was cremated at Golders Green Crematorium.

The character "Madame Annie" in Rhys Davies' The Painted King (1954) is based on Clara Novello Davies.
