= Florrie Evans =

Welsh revivalist and missionary

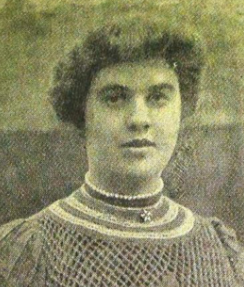
- Born: Annie Florence Evans; 15 December 1884; New Quay, Wales
- Died: 11 December 1967 (aged 82); Glan Ely Sanatorium, Cardiff, Wales
- Occupation(s): preacher and missionary
- Known for: starting the 1904–1905 Welsh revival

Annie Florence Evans known as Florrie Evans (15 December 1884 – 11 December 1967) was a Welsh revivalist, and later missionary, who was credited with starting the 1904–1905 Welsh revival.

== Life ==
Evans was born in New Quay Cardiganshire to Margaret (born Jones) and David Owen Evans. Her father was a seamen who later became a captain.

A prominent leader of the Revival was the Methodist preacher of New Quay, Joseph Jenkins who arranged a conference in New Quay in 1903 with the theme of deepening loyalty to Christ. One Sunday morning in February 1904, during one of the preacher's meetings, Evans was quoted as saying "I love Jesus Christ with all my heart". Her words were said to have made an impression on the meeting and that this was the beginning of the 1904 religious revival. Young members of Joseph Jenkins' church, led by Jenkins, went to other nearby towns and villages.

Until the end of 1905 she was involved with travelling to support the revival. She would travel with Maud Davies who was also from New Quay. They travelled all over Wales, to London and the last tour was in North Wales. Evans would do all the talking and Maud Davies would sing.

In 1908 she heard of another revival in India in the Khasis Hills and she applied to be a missionary with the Foreign Mission of the Calvinistic Methodists in India. She was accepted and by Christmas 1908 she had travelled on the SS City of Karachi to Sylhet. She was employed as a nurse until she became ill the following year. There was a reported dispute and by September 1911 she was back in her home town.

Evans died in Glan Ely Hospital in Cardiff on 11 December 1967.
