= Seth Joshua =

Seth Joshua (10 April 1858 – 21 May 1925), was a Welsh Presbyterian minister and Evangelist who was noted for his influence before during and after the 1904-1905 Welsh Revival as well as for being a direct influence on the ministry of Evan Roberts, one of the leading figures of that revival.

== Personal life ==
Born in Tŷ Capel, Pontypool, Wales, Seth Joshua was son of George and Mary Joshua. He had a younger brother, Francis (Frank) James Joshua, who was also a Presbyterian Minister. He married Mary Rees from Llantrisant, in 1883, and they had eight children. His son Peter, was a minister and a popular evangelist in United States; another son, Lyn, was credited with Mai Jones and Jimmy Harper for the Welsh standard "We'll Keep a Welcome".

== Ministry ==
Joshua, along with his brother, Frank, founded Mission Hall cause in Neath. He was a noted evangelist, travelling around Britain and visiting the United States. In 1893 he was ordained as a Presbyterian minister and worked with the Forward Movement, a branch of the Connexion's Home Mission, establishing evangelising centres in Glamorganshire and Monmouthshire.

Seth Joshua was a forerunner of the 1904-1905 Welsh Revival which began as a movement of prayer. Joshua had been praying for years that God would raise up a young man from the pits to revive the churches. In 1904, he preached at a meeting in Newcastle Emlyn which students from the Methodist Academy attended including former mine worker, Evan Roberts. The students were so moved that they cancelled classes to go to Blaenannerch in Cardiganshire where Joshua prayed publicly, O God, bend us. Evan Roberts went forward where he prayed with great agony, O God, bend me. In October 1905, Joshua, was invited to hold a mission in London. Only three were "saved", Donald Gee, the English Pentecostal Bible teacher, being one of them.

== Sources ==
Phillips, D.M. Evan Roberts, The Great Welsh Revivalist And His Work. London: Marshall Brothers, 1906.
