= Royal Welsh Ladies' Choir =

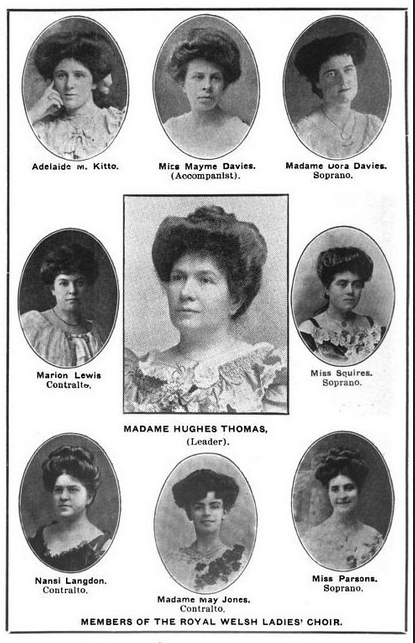
Members of the Royal Welsh Ladies' Choir in 1908.

Royal Welsh Ladies' Choir was a performing group of women singers based in Cardiff, active from the 1880s until World War II.

== Early years ==
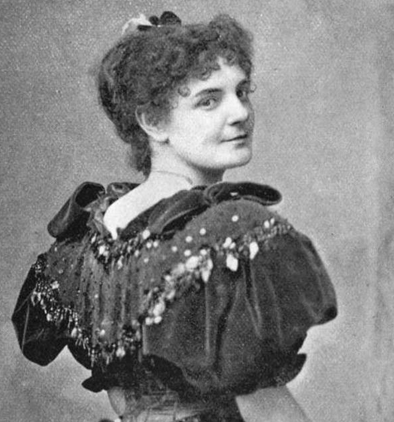
Clara Novello Davies c. 1896

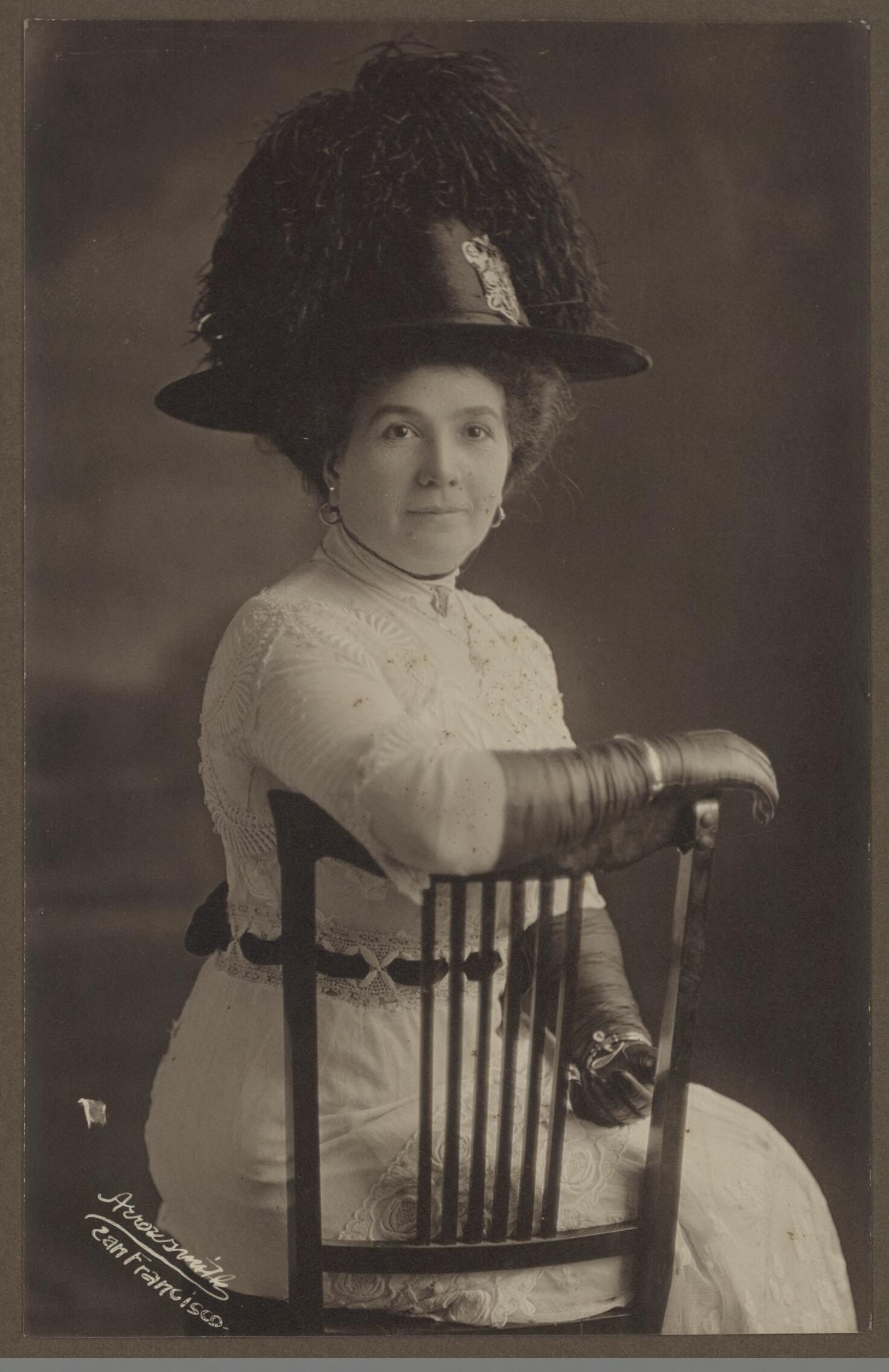
Madame Hughes Thomas, second leader of the choir

The Welsh Ladies' Choir was formed about 1883. Clara Novello Davies was its first leader, "a spirited conductress," and its members (up to 70 singers) were drawn from her own students. The choir first toured America in 1887. In 1893, they won first prize for a ladies' choir at the Eisteddfod held in connection with the World's Columbian Exhibition in Chicago. In 1894 they became officially "Royal" with a command performance for Queen Victoria at Osborne House. A smaller group (about 24) toured the United States again in 1895. In 1900, they won a prize at the Paris Exposition.

== Mrs. Hughes-Thomas ==
Madame Hughes-Thomas, the second director of the Royal Welsh Ladies' Choir, was the daughter of Rev. Richard Hughes of Maesteg. She attended the Royal Academy of Music in London. Hughes-Thomas was the second wife of Edward Thomas, the mayor of Cardiff.

== Touring ==
The Royal Welsh Ladies' Choir performed for the King Edward VII at Windsor Castle, and for the King and Queen on the Royal Yacht, at Queen Alexandra Dock in Cardiff in July 1907. The next year (1908) they embarked on a series of extensive tours of North America, including San Francisco, Winnipeg, Atlanta, and several appearances in the coal towns of the Wyoming Valley.

In 1915, three choir members left in a salary dispute, while the choir was in Detroit. They sued Hughes-Thomas and went off to tour with Canadian entertainer Ada Cosgrove instead. By 1919, Madame Hughes-Thomas was touring the United States with a group of just eight singers as the choir.

In 1920, Dame Nellie Melba praised the choir: "The Royal Welsh Lady Singers are magnificent; they are perfectly splendid, and you may say I said so."

== Later years ==
Gertrude Gronow was conducted the choir of twelve to sixteen voices, performing tours in Pennsylvania in Pittston, Canonsburg, and Franklin. In 1928, Clara Novello Davies returned to the helm in 1928 for a royal performance at Windsor Castle before the choir of sixty women departed for an Australian tour. Muriel Jones conducted the choir in 1939.
