= 1904–1905 Welsh revival =

Christian revival in Wales

The 1904–1905 Welsh revival was the largest Christian revival in Wales during the 20th century. It was one of the most dramatic in terms of its effect on the population, and triggered revivals in several other countries. The movement kept the churches of Wales filled for many years to come, seats being placed in the aisles in Mount Pleasant Baptist Church in Swansea for twenty years or so, for example. Meanwhile, the awakening swept the rest of Britain, Scandinavia, parts of Europe, North America, the mission fields of India and the Orient, Africa and Latin America. The Welsh revival has been traced as the root of the megachurches in the present era.

== Background ==
The last revival in Wales was in 1859, but this followed other developments. From 1850 onwards, Christianity in Wales was markedly less Calvinistic in form. A generation of powerful biblical preachers ended, as leaders such as Christmas Evans (1766–1838), John Elias (1744–1841) and Henry Rees (1798–1869) died.

Between 1859 and 1904, there were local revivals in Cwmafan (1866), Rhondda (1879), Carmarthen and Blaenau Ffestiniog (1887), Dowlais (1890) and Pontnewydd (1892).

== Revival begins ==
=== New Quay and Blaenannerch ===
A prominent leader of the Revival was the Methodist preacher of New Quay, Joseph Jenkins, who arranged a conference in New Quay in 1903 with the theme to deepen loyalty to Christ. During a meeting in February 1904, Florrie Evans is quoted as having said, "I love Jesus Christ with all my heart", a statement which is recognized as having made an impression on the attendees. This event supposedly initiated the revival. The regular Sunday meetings, as well as the newly founded midweek meetings, became lively. Members of Joseph Jenkins' church, led by Jenkins, traveled to other nearby towns and villages.

In September, a conference was held at Blaenannerch. It was reported that 'massive blessing' was upon this conference and the news quickly spread throughout the area and beyond. The South Wales Daily News picked up on the events and reported that "the third great revival was afoot through the nation!". The other two noted revivals were the Welsh Methodist revival and the 1859 Methodist revival.

=== Ammanford ===
In November 1904, Jenkins was invited to be a guest preacher at meetings in Bethany, Ammanford, the church of Nantlais Williams. When the appointment was arranged, there was no news yet of the conversions in New Quay and Blaenannerch, but an extra meeting was hastily arranged on the Sunday afternoon so that Joseph Jenkins could tell about the events. Williams is recorded to have said that he was worried that there would be no interest in such a meeting and he was skeptical what the turnout would be. However, when he arrived, he could only just squeeze into the chapel to hear Jenkins.

It had been arranged that Jenkins was to preach on the Monday night before his return to New Quay. The church was again full with people professing their faith in Jesus. Perhaps the most dramatic turn was when one of the crowd members announced, "Another meeting like this will be held here tomorrow night". That meeting was also well attended and went on until the early hours of the next morning. Despite already having been ordained as a minister, on that weekend in November 1904, Williams had a conversion experience, on the Saturday night prior to Jenkins' arrival.

=== North Wales ===
In December 1904, Joseph Jenkins embarked on three months of preaching and professing in areas of North Wales. Many meetings were held in Amlwch, Llangefni, Llanerchymedd, Talysarn, Llanllyfni, Llanrwst, Denbigh, and Dinorwig, and some students at the University of Wales Bangor were converted. But perhaps the most conversions were seen in Bethesda; another leader of the revival, J. T. Job, described the meeting held in Jerusalem, Bethesda on 22 December 1904 as "a hurricane".

=== Evan Roberts and Loughor ===
Evan Roberts was a young man influenced by the stories and experiences that were happening in New Quay and Blaenannerch. He decided to go to Newcastle Emlyn for ministerial training, and arrived in the revival in south Ceredigion. The news of the mass conversions in New Quay and Blaenannerch had already spread to Newcastle Emlyn and were a distraction for a man who had been sent there to study. Seth Joshua, another prominent leader of the revival, was invited to preach locally at a youth rally in Newquay, which Roberts had been given permission by the bible school to attend. Seth had been praying for many years for God to give him Wales. In this early morning meeting at Blaenanarch chapel, Seth prayed publicly, "O God, bend us." Evan Roberts went forward where he prayed with great agony, "O God, bend me."

After Evan's three months training at Newcastle Emlyn he was to return to Loughor to start his ministry. He claimed to have direct visions from the Holy Spirit: very specific visions, such as the number 100,000 representing the souls God intended to use him to save. As the revival unfolded, Roberts is said to have depended increasingly upon what he considered the guidance of the Holy Spirit.

Response to Roberts' ministry was initially slow, but soon the crowds turned out and the meetings were carried on until the early hours of the morning. After the meeting at Loughor, Roberts assembled a team and went on a tour of the South Wales valleys to spread the revival.

Roberts did not take the decline of the revival well. The great expectations of a worldwide revival that had arisen in his team were frustrated, and he afterwards fell into depression. He was then housed by a friend in England at Leicester, and co-wrote a book with his friend's wife Jessie Penn-Lewis, War on the Saints, believed by some to be heretical because of its use of the term "possession" to describe demonic spirits' potential effect on believers, from which he dissociated himself after he recovered from depression and the book was severely criticised. In 1913, when Roberts's mother was dying, his brother Dan tried to see him to ask him to visit his mother. Roberts refused contact. Eventually "Awstin", the reporter of the revival, gained access. There were rumours that Roberts was being held prisoner by the Penn-Lewises. Roberts spoke freely about how God was preparing him for his next great work, and sent, via "Awstin", "God's message to the churches of south Wales". Because of Roberts's treatment of his mother, the message was ignored.

=== Aberdare ===
Aberdare became a major centre of the revival and the first area that Evan Roberts visited following his initial meetings at Loughor. In the Aberdare area, the revival aroused alarm among ministers for the revolutionary, even anarchistic, impact it had upon chapel congregations and denominational organization. In particular, it was seen as drawing attention away from pulpit preaching and the role of the minister. The local newspaper, the Aberdare Leader, regarded the revival with suspicion from the outset, objecting to the 'abnormal heat' which it engendered. Trecynon was particularly affected by the revival, and the meetings held there were said to have aroused more emotion and excitement than the more restrained meetings in Aberdare itself. The impact of the revival was significant in the short term, but in the longer term was fairly transient.

=== Role of newspapers ===
For the first time, the newspapers had a role in this revival. The Western Mail and the South Wales Daily News, Wales' daily newspapers, spread news of conversions and generated an air of excitement that helped to fuel the revival. The Western Mail in particular gave extensive coverage to Roberts' meetings in Loughor. The articles were gathered together and published as a series of seven pamphlets, including copies of picture postcards of the revivalists that were published at the time. The contents of the final pamphlet are credited by some as killing the revival. Peter Price, a minister from Dowlais, wrote a letter that was very critical of Evan Roberts. Price wanted to distinguish between the genuine revival that he believed was going on and a sham revival he associated with Evan Roberts. The pamphlet contains many letters in support of Evan Roberts (the majority), and a few supporting Price. Vyrynwy Morgan gives further letters supporting Price.

== Interpretations ==
The Welsh revival has been described not as an isolated religious movement, but as very much a part of Britain's modernisation. The revival began in late 1904 under the leadership of Evan Roberts (1878–1951), a 26-year-old former collier and minister in training. The revival lasted less than a year, but in that time 100,000 people were converted. Begun as an effort to kindle non-denominational, non-sectarian spirituality, the Welsh revival of 1904–05 coincided with the rise of the labour movement, socialism, and a general disaffection with religion among the working class and youths. Placed in context, the short-lived revival appears as both a climax for nonconformism and a flashpoint of change in Welsh religious life. The movement spread to Scotland and England, with estimates that a million people were converted in Britain. Missionaries subsequently carried the movement abroad; it was especially influential on the Pentecostal movement emerging in California.

Unlike earlier religious revivals based on powerful preaching, the revival of 1904–05 relied primarily on music and on alleged supernatural phenomena as exemplified by the visions of Evan Roberts. The intellectual emphasis of the earlier revivals had left a dearth of religious imagery that the visions supplied. The visions also challenged the denial of the spiritual and miraculous element of Scripture by opponents of the revival, who held liberal and critical theological positions. The structure and content of the visions not only repeated those of Scripture and earlier Christian mystical tradition but also illuminated the personal and social tensions that the revival addressed by juxtaposing Biblical images with scenes familiar to contemporary Welsh believers.

The after-effects of the revival were considered by Vyrynwy Morgan in the final chapter of his book, which gives the figures for convictions for drunkenness in the county of Glamorgan for the years 1902 to 1907, supplied by the police. There is a near 50% reduction after the revival.

== In popular culture ==
- The novels Queen of the Rushes (1906) by Allen Raine, and The Withered Root (1927) by Rhys Davies were inspired by the 1904–1905 Welsh revival.
- In 2004, the BBC's Bread of Heaven series featured a programme on the 1904 Welsh revival, which was presented by Huw Edwards.
- In 2005 a musical was made about the 1904–1905 Welsh revival. The music and lyrics were written by Mal Pope and the book is by Frank Vickery. Its first tour began at the Grand Theatre, Swansea, Wales and was directed by Michael Bogdanov with the Wales Theatre Company and included an appearance from Peter Karrie.

== See also ==
- Christian revival
- Elim Pentecostal Church
- Finished Work Pentecostalism
- Divergence between Anglicanism and Methodism
