= List of waterfalls in Wales =

Wales is a mountainous country with a wet climate and hence home to many hundreds of waterfalls. Some are popular visitor attractions, many are celebrated in legend whilst others are relatively unknown.

== Naming of falls ==
As might be expected in this bilingual country, many waterfalls are known by both English and Welsh names. The terms rhaeadr, sgwd, pistyll and ffrwd all feature in the Welsh names of waterfalls. Sgwd (plural sgydau) is restricted to the southern part of mid Wales, notably Brecknockshire whilst pistyll is common in the northern parts of mid Wales.

== Alphabetical table of named waterfalls ==
Waterfall name	River or stream	OS Grid ref.	general location
Aber Falls or Rhaeadr-fawr	Afon Goch / Afon Rhaeadr-fawr	SH668700	near Abergwyngregyn
Aberdulais Falls	River Dulais	SS772995	near Aberdulais
Arthog Falls	Afon Arthog	SH647143	near Arthog, Fairbourne
Berw-ddu	Afon Dar	SO962020	west of Aberdare
Berw Wion	Nant Lluest / Nant Berw Wion (tributary of River Rhondda)	SS917997	near Blaenrhondda
Cenarth Falls	River Teifi	SN269415	near Cenarth
Cleddon Falls	unnamed tributary of River Wye	SO520039	near Llandogo
Conwy Falls or Rhaeadr y Graig Lwyd	River Conwy	SH808535	near Penmachno
Cyfyng Falls	Afon Llugwy	SH734571	near Capel Curig
Devil's Punchbowl	Afon Mynach	SN742770	near Devil's Bridge
Dolgoch Falls	Nant Dol-goch	SH654042	near Dolgoch
Dwfr Ddisgynfa Cwm-du	Afon Cwmau	SN041337	in Cwm Gwaun
Dyserth Falls	Afon Ffyddion	SJ057793	near Dyserth
Fairy Falls or Rhaeadr y Tylwyth Teg	Afon Crafnant	SH777630	near Trefriw
Ffrwd Fawr	Afon Twymyn	SN872940	near Dylife
Ffrwd Milwyn	Nant Milwyn	SN790732	in Cwm Ystwyth
Glynhir Waterfall	River Loughor	SN641151	near Llandybie
Gyfarllwyd Falls	Afon Rheidol	SN742775	near Devil's Bridge
Hengwm Waterfall	Afon Hengwm	SN744934	near Forge
Henrhyd Falls	Nant Llech	SN853119	near Coelbren, Powys
Horseshoe Falls	River Dee or Afon Dyfrdwy	SJ195433	near Llangollen
Llanberis Waterfall	Afon Arddu	SH578593	near Llanberis
Llech Sychryd	Nant Hir, tributary of River Cynon	SN991073	near Hirwaun
Lower Cilhepste Falls	Afon Hepste, tributary of River Mellte	SN927099	near Penderyn
Machno Falls	Afon Machno	SH808532	near Penmachno
Melincourt Falls	Melincourt Brook	SN825016	near Resolven
Mynach Falls or Rhaeadr Mynach	Afon Mynach	SN742772	near Devil's Bridge
Pistyll Blaen-y-cwm	Afon Tanat	SJ007276	near Pennant Melangell
Pistyll Cablyd	Nant Achlas	SJ014266	near Pennant Melangell
Pistyll Cain	Afon Gain	SH733276	in Coed y Brenin
Pistyll Du	Nant y Graean, tributary of Afon Gain	SH735304	north edge of Coed-y-Brenin
Pistyll Goleu	Sychnant, tributary of Nant Clydach	ST033963	northeast of Llanwonno
Pistyll Gwyn	Afon Crawcwellt	SH672299	east of Rhinogion
Pistyll Gwyn	Afon Pumryd, tributary of River Dovey	SH884195	near Llanymawddwy
Pistyll Henfynachlog	Afon Eiddon, Afon Wnion	SH807231	near Rhydymain
Pistyll y Llyn	Llyfnant	SN753942	south of Machynlleth
Pistyll Rhaeadr	Afon Disgynfa / Afon Rhaeadr	SJ073295	near Llanrhaeadr-ym-Mochnant
Pistyll Rhyd-y-meinciau	Afon Eiddew	SH953246	near Llyn Efyrnwy
Pistyll y Graig-ddu	Nant y Craig-ddu	SJ095189	near Llanfyllin
Pistyll y Gyfyng	Afon Goch	SJ021246	near Llangynog
Pwll y Crochan	Sychryd	SN925071	near Rhigos
Pwll Annie	Nant Ffrwd	SO024075	near Cefn-coed-y-cymmer
Pwll-y-Gerwyn	Dare	SN991026	near Aberdare
Pwll y wrach	River Ennig	SO169327	southeast of Talgarth
Rhaeadr Blaenhafren	River Severn	SN835884	in Hafren Forest
Rhaeadr-bach	Afon Rhaeadr-bach	SH664697	near Abergwyngregyn
Rhaeadr Cynfal	Afon Cynfal	SH704412	near Llan Ffestiniog
Rhaeadr Du	Afon Prysor	SH667387	near Maentwrog
Rhaeadr Ewynnol or Swallow Falls	Afon Llugwy	SH765577	near Betws-y-coed
Rhaeadr Du or Black Waterfalls	Afon Gamlan	SH720245	in Coed-y-Brenin
Rhaeadr-fawr or Aber Falls	Afon Goch / Afon Rhaeadr-fawr	SH668700	near Abergwyngregyn
Rhaeadr Garth or Garth Falls	tributary of Afon Llugwy	SH777568	near Betws y Coed
Rhaeadr Mawddach	Afon Mawddach	SH736275	in Coed-y-Brenin
Rhaeadr Mynach or Mynach Falls	Afon Mynach	SN742772	near Devil's Bridge
Rhaeadr Ogwen or Ogwen Falls	Afon Ogwen	SH648605	Nant Ffrancon
Rhaeadr Peiran	Nant Peiran	SN770736	in Cwm Ystwyth
Rhaeadr y Cwm	Afon Cynfal	SH740417	near Llan Ffestiniog
Rhaeadr y Tylwyth Teg or Fairy Falls	Afon Conwy	SH777631	near Trefriw
Rhayadr Cynwyd	Afon Trystion	SJ064405	near Cynwyd
Rheidol Falls	Afon Rheidol	SN709788	near Devil's Bridge
Severn-break-its-Neck or Hafren-Torri-Gwddf	River Severn or Afon Hafren	SN863867	in Hafren Forest
Sgwd Clun-gwyn	Afon Mellte	SN924109	near Ystradfellte
Sgwd Ddu	Afon Haffes	SN829179	near Glyntawe
Sgwd Ddwli Isaf	Nedd Fechan	SN903097	near Pontneddfechan
Sgwd Ddwli Uchaf	Nedd Fechan	SN905099	near Pontneddfechan
Sgwd Isaf Clun-gwyn	Afon Mellte	SN923106	near Ystradfellte
Sgwd Einion Gam	Afon Pyrddin	SN890093	near Pontneddfechan
Sgwd Gwladus	Afon Pyrddin	SN896093	near Pontneddfechan
Sgwd y Bedol	Nedd Fechan	SN902097	near Pontneddfechan
Sgwd yr Eira	Afon Hepste	SN928099	near Ystradfellte, Penderyn
Sgwd y Ffrwd	Nant y Ffrwd	SN862561	near Tywi Forest
Sgwd y Pannwr	Afon Mellte	SN923102	near Ystradfellte
Sgwd Wen	Nant y Cae	SN855457	near Llanwrtyd Wells
Sgydau Sychryd or Sychryd Cascade	Afon Sychryd	SN915080	near Pontneddfechan
Swallow Falls or Rhaeadr Ewynnol	Afon Llugwy	SH765577	near Betws-y-coed
The Grey Mare's Tail or Rhaeadr y Parc Mawr	unnamed tributary of Afon Conwy	SH789610	near Llanrwst
Water-break-its-neck	unnamed tributary of River Lugg	SO183735	near Llangunllo
Water-break-its-neck	Black Brook	SO183600	near Llanfihangel Nant Melan

== See also ==
- List of waterfalls
- Waterfall Country
