= Afon Pyrddin =

River in mid Wales

Coordinates: 51°46′N 3°36′W

The Afon Pyrddin is a river forming a short section of the boundary between Powys and Neath Port Talbot in Wales, United Kingdom. It also forms a part of the boundary of the Brecon Beacons National Park. The river and its waterfalls are one of the key attractions of the Fforest Fawr Geopark, designated in 2005.

The name could mean 'river by the striking fortress' or 'sweet-flowing river'.

The streams of Nant y Bryn, Nant y Fedwen and Nant Hir come together to form the Pyrddin which flows south-eastwards for 3 miles (5 km) to its confluence with the Nedd Fechan.

== Waterfalls ==
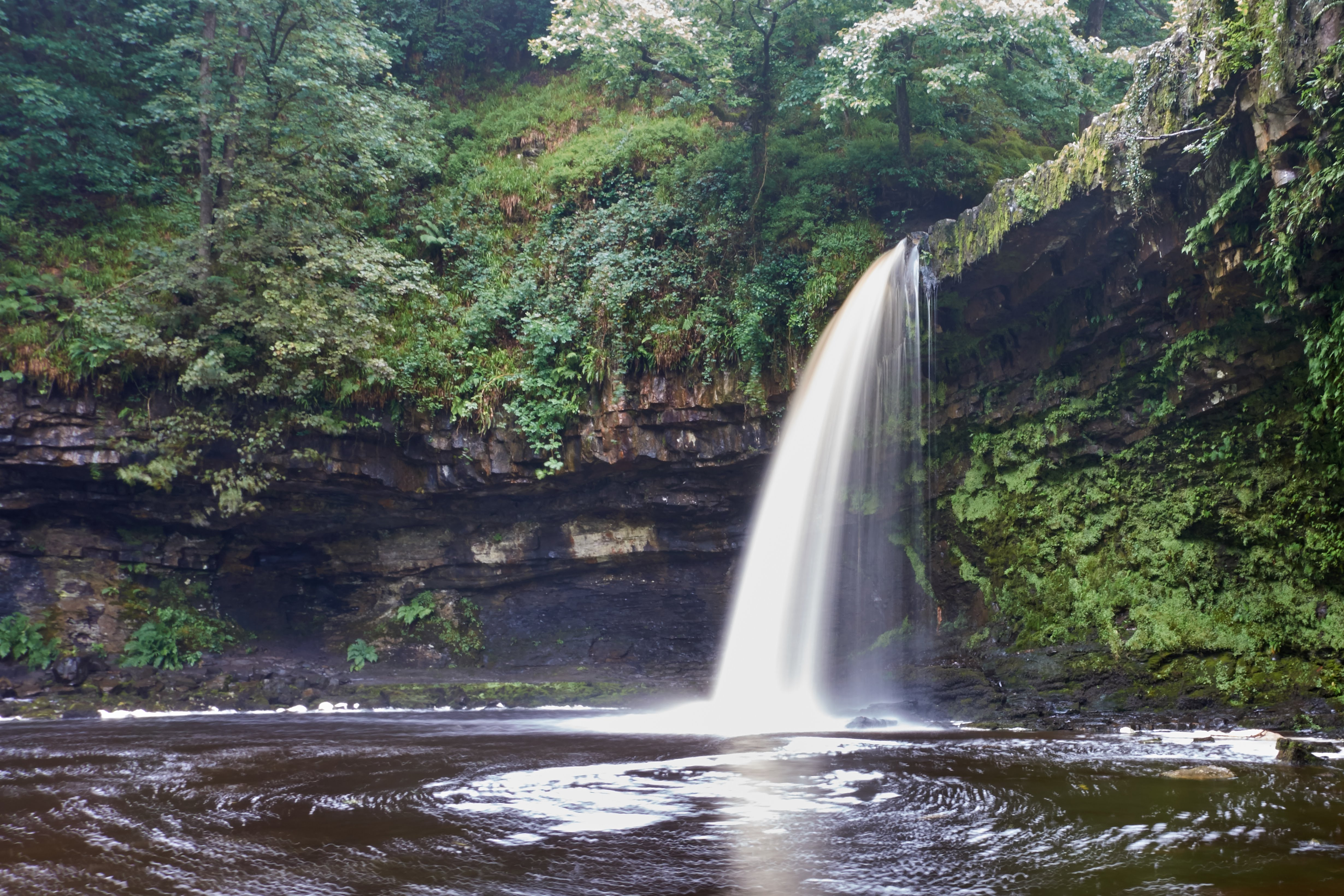
Sgwd Gwladys

The Pyrddin is best known for two spectacular waterfalls, Sgwd Gwladus (sometimes 'Gwladys') and Sgwd Einion Gam, meaning the 'fall of Gwladus' and the 'fall of crooked Einion' respectively. Both Gwladus and Einion are personal names. Sgwd Gwladus is formed where a band of erosion-resistant gritstone known as the 'Twelve Foot Sandstone' creates a lip over which the river plunges. It is easily accessible by footpath from Pontneddfechan (also known as Pontneathvaughan). A notable feature above the fall is an erratic block of gritstone which was balanced so that it rocked – at least until Victorian times, when it was displaced. The ruins of a small building close to the falls are thought to be those of a corn-mill.

Sgwd Einion Gam, which is a further half mile upstream, can be accessed only by crossing and re-crossing the river itself. This fall is caused by the presence of a geological fault, which brings another hard sandstone known as the 'Farewell Rock' up against softer mudstones.

== Habitat protection ==
The steep and wooded gorge of the Pyrddin – like that of its neighbours, the Nedd Fechan, Afon Mellte, and Afon Hepste – is home to many rare bryophytes which enjoy the cool, humid conditions which exist here. Accordingly, it has been designated as both a site of special scientific interest and a special area of conservation.

== See also ==
- Waterfall Country (Wales)
