= Mynach Falls =

- Rhaeadr Mynach (Welsh); Devil's Bridge Falls
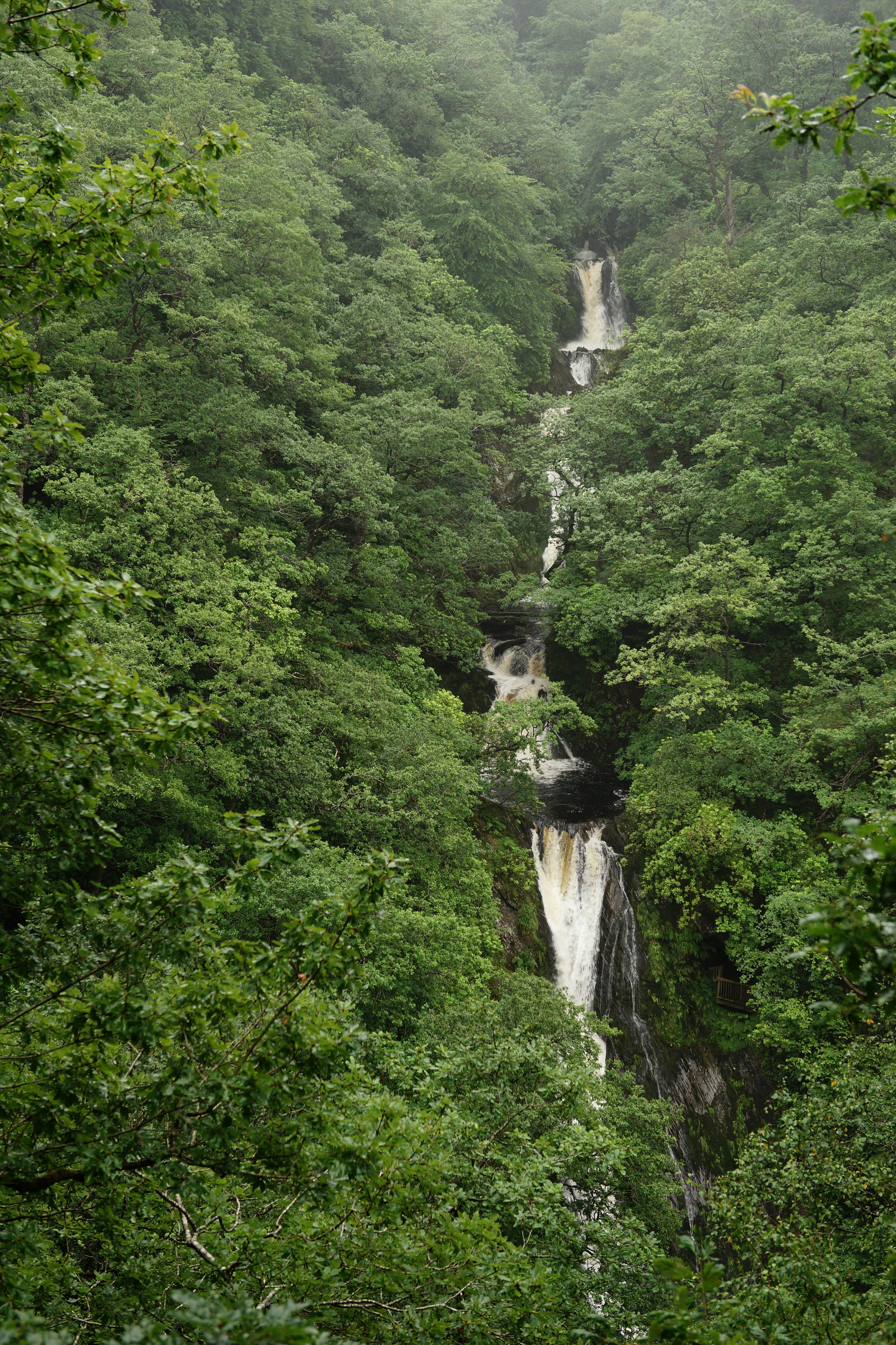
- The falls
- Interactive map of Mynach Falls
- Location: Ceredigion, Wales
- Coordinates: 52.377°N 3.850°W
- Type: Segmented
- Total height: 90 metres (300 ft)
- Number of drops: 5

Mynach Falls (Welsh: Rhaeadr Mynach), also known as the Devil's Bridge Falls (or Devil's Bridge Waterfall(s)), is a waterfall in Devil's Bridge, near Aberystwyth, in Ceredigion, Wales.

It occurs where Afon Mynach drops 90 metres (300 ft) in 5 steps down a steep and narrow ravine before it meets Afon Rheidol.

The area is famous for the Devil's Bridge (Welsh: Pontarfynach, 'bridge over the Mynach [river]'), a series of three arch bridges that span the river, one above the other. The area near the waterfall is the terminus of the Vale of Rheidol Railway.

== See also ==
- List of waterfalls
- List of waterfalls in Wales
