= Afon Sychryd =

River in Rhondda Cynon Taf, Wales

Coordinates: 51.7595°N 3.5798°W

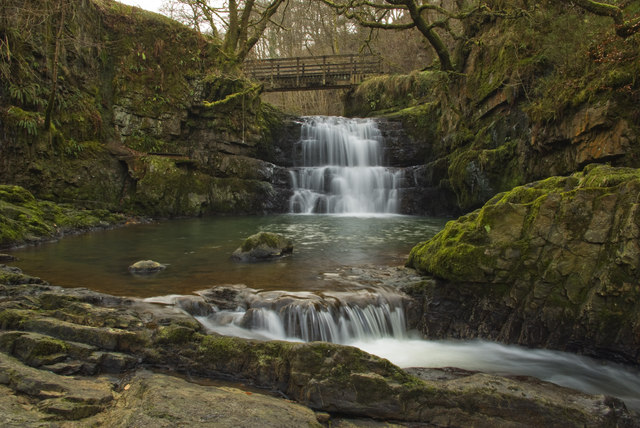
This little-known waterfall lies hidden deep in the Sychryd gorge.

The Afon Sychryd is a river in Rhondda Cynon Taf, Wales. Although it is a relatively short river, with a total length of 3 miles (5 km), it is notable for the gorge and two waterfalls through which it flows.

== Course ==
The river has two upper arms, the first arises near Penderyn, which has been dammed to create a small reservoir, known as Penderyn Reservoir. The second arm starts just below Craig y Llyn and is known locally as the Nant Gwrangon; it flows past the village of Rhigos and through Cwm Wyrfa on the edge of the Brecon Beacons National Park.

Where the two arm joins it flows through the southern slopes of the Fforest Fawr Geopark and under the A465 Heads of the Valleys Road and turns northwest to join the Afon Mellte at Pontneddfechan.

Its lower section is cut into a spectacular gorge beneath Dinas Rock (Craig-y-Ddinas), site of an Iron Age hillfort and of the once-famous Dinas Silica Mine. The gorge is well used by gorge-scramblers though there has been concern that their activities can cause damage to the rare bryophytes and mosses that colonise the rocks in this shaded valley and for which it has been designated as a special area of conservation.

There are several waterfalls of note on the river including those at Pwll y Crochan near the A645 and Sgydau Sychryd beneath Craig-y-Ddinas. The former is hardly accessible to the public but the latter is easily seen from the Sychryd All-ability Trail which follows a former tramroad up the river from the car park at Craig-y-Ddinas. It is falls such as these that have resulted in the wider area becoming known as Waterfall Country.
