= Craig y Ddinas =

Promontory in Rhondda Cynon Taf, Wales

Coordinates: 51.7606°N 3.5747°W

- promontory
- Interactive map of Craig y Ddinas
- Location: Wales

Location of Craig y Ddinas within the Fforest Fawr Geopark (pink area) and Brecon Beacons National Park (pink plus green areas)

Craig y Ddinas (also known as Dinas Rock) is a 152-metre (499 ft) promontory of Carboniferous Limestone which rises between the confluence of the Mellte and Sychryd rivers on the border between Powys and Neath Port Talbot in south Wales. It is located about 1 kilometre (0.62 mi) east of Pontneddfechan near Glyn Neath at the head of the Vale of Neath. It derives its name from the presence of Iron Age earthworks on its summit, dinas in Welsh signifying a defensive site or 'city'.

== History ==
=== Craig y Ddinas Hillfort ===
Situated on top of the promontory is the Craig y Ddinas Hillfort, a fortification of national significance for its late-prehistoric defensive structures and its archaeological potential. The majority of the site was defended naturally by the sheer cliffs which drop down to the rivers below (the west end has since been quarried away) with two linear ramparts were constructed from limestone rubble to defend the eastern and northern sides. The outer rampart extends for around 100m and is up to 2.2 metres heigh and 3 metres wide. The larger, inner rampart extends for approximately 150m, but was originally at least 542 metres long. The western end of the fort is the location of a possible gateway where the ancient trackway from Penderyn to Neath passes through an oblique breach through the inner rampart but both ramparts have been disturbed by post Iron-Age activities, including a field wall and tramways connecting early industrial quarry workings in the interior of the site.

=== The Dinas Firebrick ===
Deposits of silica were discovered in the 1780s and mining activity began soon after, with a tramway being constructed in 1807, bridging Afon Sychryd and linking the mines with the Neath and Tennant Canal. The first large scale mining at Dinas was by the local surveyor, amateur geologist and pooter William Weston Young, In 1822 Young leased the lands around Craig y Ddinas from the Marquis of Bute and established the "Dinas Fire Brick Co." in October of that year. Young's range of experience enabled him to invent a heat-proof, blast-furnace brick, using the local materials. His invention of the silica firebrick led to the new product being called The "Dinas Firebrick" which allowed the interior of blast furnaces to vitrify, making them vastly more durable and economical. As such Dinas Firebricks were sold throughout the world. Mining activities would cease c.1921, but restarted in 1930. By August 1963 it was reported that only two men were working the mines and that much of the mine-workings had been flooded. The mine finally closed the following year.

== Mythology ==
An engraving of Edward Facon Watson's view of lightning appearing over the mountains at Craig y Ddinas (left) and an 1855 photograph of Craig y Ddinas by Hugh Owen

The landscape at Craig y Ddinas has featured in various tales from Welsh mythology.

=== Arthurian legend ===
In one legend, a Welshman is walking across Old London Bridge when a stranger notices the neat Hazel staff he is carrying. The stranger enquires about the staff but the Welshman is hesitant to answer, believing the stranger to be one of the Dynion hysbys (Welsh for 'knowing ones'). However, the stranger assures him that "if you will only answer my questions, and take my advice, it will be of greater benefit to you than you imagine. That stick in your hand grew on a spot where, hid under it, are vast treasures of gold and silver; and if you remember the place, and can conduct me to it, I will put you in possession of those treasures", and the Welshman agrees.

The two travel back to where the Welshman had cut his staff from a large old hazel at Craig y Ddinas and dig up the tree to find a large flat stone underneath. Removing the stone, the men find a very large cavern and a passageway with a solitary bell hanging from the ceiling. In the furthest reaches of the cave the men discover thousands of armour-clad warriors, lying in a circle, fast asleep. One such warrior is greatly distinguished from the rest by his arms, shield and a golden crown. In the middle of the warriors circle is two very large piles, one of gold and one of silver. The stranger tells the Welshman that he is entitled to take as much gold or silver as he can carry but is cautioned not to touch the bell as he leaves. The stranger however takes none, saying that contempt for gold is what has enabled him to attain such wisdom.

the Welshman loads himself up with gold and is so encumbered that he is unable to pass by the bell without ringing it. As such, one of the sleeping warriors lifts up his head and asks "Is it day?" and the stranger answers promptly "No, it is not, sleep thou on!" and the warrior returns to sleep. The men leave the cave, relay the stone over its entrance and replanted the hazel tree. The stranger reveals that the distinguished person he had seen was Arthur, waiting in readiness for the day that bell would ring loudly, and they will rise and destroy the enemies of the Cymry. He advises the Welshman to be economical with his newfound wealth but that he may also return to this cave should he once again be reduced to poverty. Finally, he is cautioned never to touch the bell again, but that if he should and one or more of the warriors awakes to ask if it were day, he was to answer "No, it is not, sleep thou on!" without hesitation.

Sometime later the wealth is spent and the Welshman returns to the cave and, once again overburdens himself and accidentally rings the bell. One of the sleeping warriors lifts his head and asks if it is day, but this time the covetous Welshman is unable to answer, breathless from carrying such a heavy load and struck with terror as more and more of the warriors rise up and approach him. The warriors retake their gold and beat him before throwing him out of the cave and drawing the stone back in place. The Welshman leaves the cave as poor as he ever was but now with severe injuries, living to a great age but always in this poor condition. He returns to Craig y Ddinas many times seeking treasure and although he employs associates to dig every inch of the hill, he can never again find the cave's entrance.

=== Tylwyth Teg ===
In 1880, the United States Consul at Cardiff, Wirt Sikes wrote that while the Vale of Neath was widely regarded as the home of the Tylwyth Teg, this was especially true of "a certain steep and rugged crag there, called Craig y Ddinas". Sikes stated that at the time of his writing, there were still men living who could recall sightings of the Tylwyth Teg at Craig y Ddinas and that the area bore "a distinctly awful reputation as a stronghold of the fairy tribe". Sikes recorded that the creatures had favoured the site for many centuries and that their last known appearance in Wales was a court held on the site.

== Protected landscape and habitats ==
Craig y Ddinas lies within the Brecon Beacons National Park and the Fforest Fawr Geopark. It is owned by Natural Resources Wales, who manage it for its wildlife interest and recreation. The mineral rights (and thus relicts of former mining and quarrying) are owned by Natural Amenities Ltd, a body concerned with the preservation of mines. The deep gorges which define its northern and southern edges are designated as a part of the Coedydd Nedd a Mellte (Neath & Mellte Woodlands) Special Area of Conservation (SAC) on account of their thick oak and ash woodlands, which shelter important bryophyte communities, in particular certain species of moss. The woodlands are also designated as a part of the Dyffrynoedd Nedd a Mellte a Moel Penderyn (Neath & Mellte Valleys and Moel Penderyn) Site of Special Scientific Interest.

== Industrial archaeology ==
The former limestone quarry is now a car park; its walls are used by climbers and abseilers. The Dinas Silica Mines just to the east of Craig y Ddinas itself used to provide large quantities of very pure crushed sandstone destined for the manufacture of refractory bricks for furnace linings and the like. A system of tramways, aerial cableways and inclines on the southern flanks of Craig y Ddinas conveyed the material from the mines to the valley below.

== Recreation ==
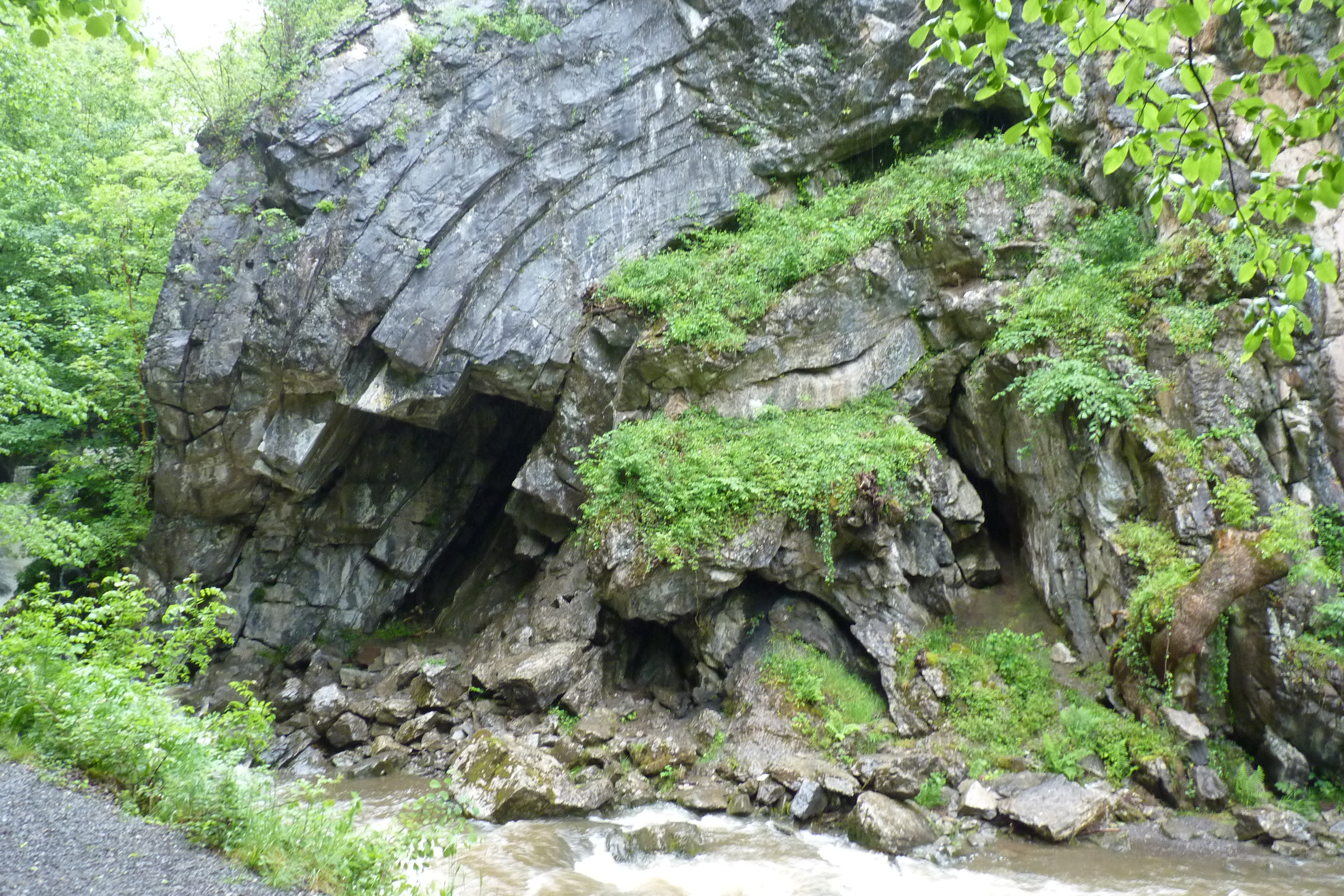
Bwa Maen (Welsh for 'stone bow') displaying the extreme folding of rock along the Neath Disturbance

Its dramatic appearance has long made Craig y Ddinas a destination for casual visitors, but its steep rocky flanks also attract rock climbers and gorge-walkers. The tramways now provide routes for walkers to enjoy the site, in particular the Sychryd easy-access trail, which runs for ¼ mile from the main car park to the Sgydau Sychryd cascade between Craig y Ddinas and the spectacular rock known as Bwa Maen, on the southern side of Afon Sychryd.

=== Climbing ===
The steep and overhanging southern faces of Craig y Ddinas are moderately popular with sports climbers, whilst easier routes are enjoyed by organised groups in the former quarry at the western end of the rock. It is considered by some as the best inland cliff in South Wales for rock climbing. The cliff features 75 sports routes through a variety of grades on clean rock with a variety of styles and features.

=== Gorge walking ===
The beds and rocky sides of the two rivers provide one of the most popular venues in Wales for gorge-walkers. Natural Resources Wales (NRW) works with organised adventure sports providers and landowners to manage this activity, so as to minimise the damage which it can cause to the SAC, which NRW is charged with protecting under European environmental protection law.

=== Caving ===
There are a few short caves in and around Craig y Ddinas, including Ogof Pont Sychryd, Ogof Bwa Maen and Will's Hole. The last named is also known as Arthur's Cave or Dinas Rock Cave and extends to just under 400 metres (1,300 ft) in length. It is associated with Arthurian legend, as it is one of the many locations reputed to be the place where Arthur's knights lie waiting for a call to defend Britain.

=== Motorcycle sport ===
The International Six Days Trial was first held in 1913 in Carlisle. The event originally a reliability test became the premiere off road event sometimes known as the Olympics or Davis Cup of Motorcycling and was reported on across the world and in News Reels and National Daily Papers. It took place in Wales in 1933, 1937, 1938, and 1949 starting from Llandrindod Wells. Each day the riders faced about 400 km of riding. In these years the course passes and featured Craig y Ddinas as a technical challenging feature. It was sufficiently noted for the specialist press photographers to catch the riders passing through and images of Craig y Ddinas are found in the motorcycle magazine reports of the time.
