= Waterfall Country (Wales) =

Alternate name for Vale of Neath, Wales

Coordinates: 51.75°N 3.59°W

Waterfall Country (or sometimes Waterfalls Country) (Welsh: Bro'r Sgydau) is a name often given to the upper reaches of the Vale of Neath in South Wales. The tourist area around the head of the valley has an unusually large number of publicly accessible waterfalls. The area is not officially defined but generally includes the group of falls on the Nedd Fechan, Pyrddin, Hepste and Mellte rivers, all of which lie between the villages of Pontneddfechan and Ystradfellte in the Brecon Beacons National Park.

Each of these falls lies within or on the boundary of the county of Powys. A few miles further west are Henrhyd Falls on the Nant Llech, a tributary of the Tawe and to the south-west are Melin Court Falls on the Melin Court Brook, a tributary of the River Neath. These, along with Aberdulais Falls on the Dulais, a further tributary of the Neath are also encompassed by the term 'Waterfall/s Country' by some writers.

Collectively the falls are one of the more popular natural attractions in South Wales, which has caused problems of erosion in the vicinity of many of the falls. Most occupy locations designated as sites of special scientific interest and as special areas of conservation which aim to protect the biodiversity and geodiversity of these sites. The designations place a duty on the landowners and managers to protect the sites and so various erosion control measures have been put in place in an attempt to counter the worst problems.

== Origins ==
Virtually all of the falls occur on tributaries of the River Neath occupying valleys that have been deeply incised into the landscape. It is suggested that overdeepening of the Vale of Neath by glacier ice during the succession of ice ages has resulted in these tributaries cutting down into their own beds as they adjust to a base level lower than in pre-glacial times. The underlying geology is a generally southerly dipping succession of Carboniferous age sandstones and mudstones assigned by geologists to the Marros Group and formerly referred to as the Millstone Grit Series. Preferential erosion, whereby the less resistant mudstones have been more readily removed by the passage of water, often following various forms of weathering, has left sandstones forming the lips of the falls. The siting of individual falls is closely linked in many cases to the presence of northwest–southeast–aligned faults that have brought different lithologies into proximity.

== The Falls ==
=== On the Afon Mellte ===
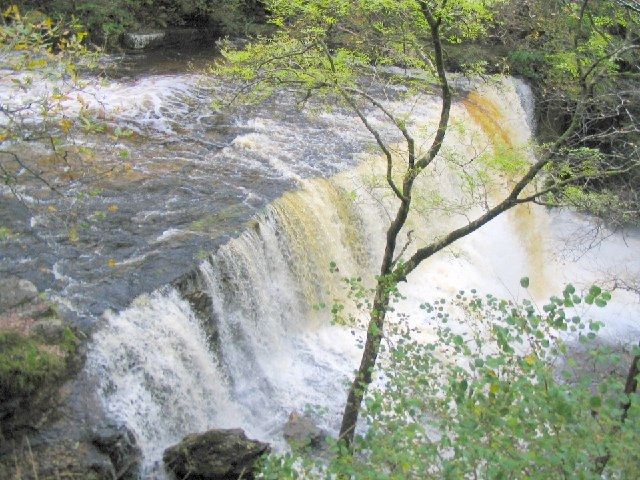
Sgwd Clun-gwyn (Sgwd Uchaf Clun-gwyn) in high flow conditions

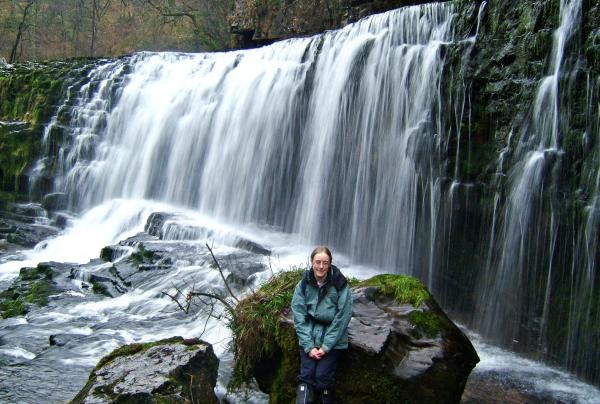
Uppermost fall of the complex Sgwd Isaf Clun-gwyn

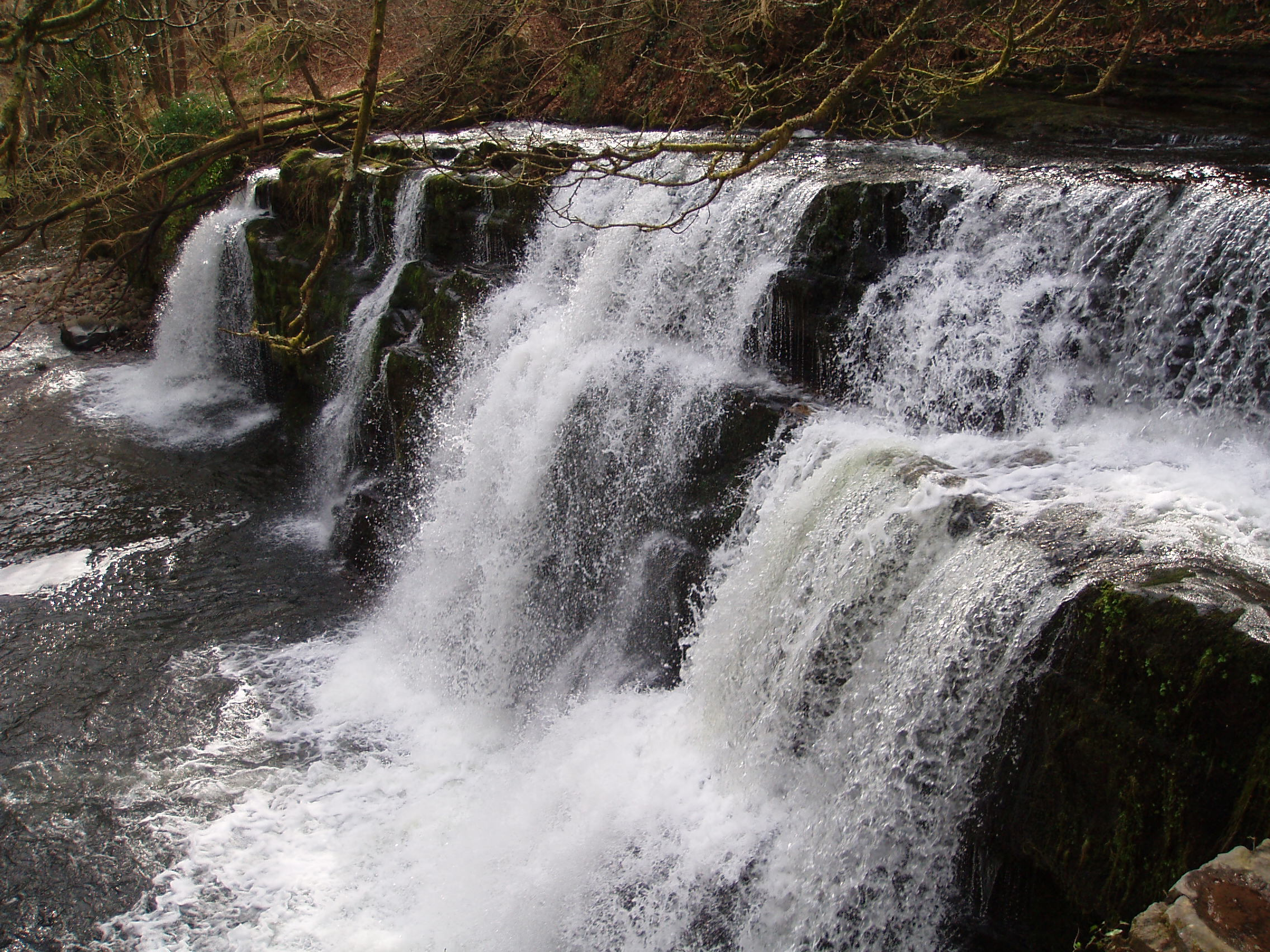
Sgwd y Pannwr

There are three waterfalls of note on this river though several other lesser falls can also be found along its length.

- Sgwd Clun-gwyn – the 'fall of the white meadow' is the uppermost of the three celebrated falls on the Mellte. It is formed where a north-northwest to south-southeast trending fault brings hard sandstone up against softer mudstone.
- Sgwd Isaf Clun-gwyn – the 'lower fall of the white meadow' is the middle one of the three named falls but is itself multi-staged.
- Sgwd y Pannwr – the 'fall of the fuller' or 'fall of the woollen washer' is the lowermost of the three falls.

=== On the Afon Hepste ===
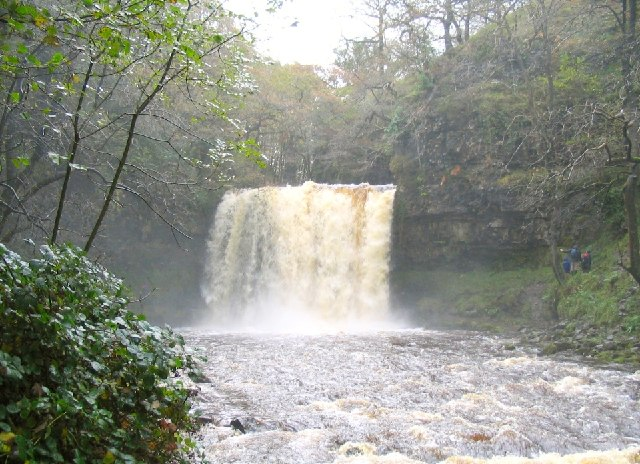
Sgwd yr Eira in full flow

Sgwd yr Eira – famous for being the falls behind which you can walk, the 'falls of snow' plunge over a hard band of sandstone whose overhang protects the walker from the full force of the water flowing down Afon Hepste. The closure of the path behind this most popular of falls during much of 2007 and 2008 on safety Afon Hepste was controversial. Stabilisation works agreed between the then landowners, the Forestry Commission and the Countryside Council for Wales and the Brecon Beacons National Park Authority allowed the route to be re-opened later in 2008. For a walk taking in Sgwd Clun-gwyn, Sgwd Isaf Clun-gwyn and Sgwd yr Eira see 'Waterfall Walk' under Ystradfellte.

=== On the Nedd Fechan ===
There are three falls of particular interest to visitors on this river, though like the Mellte, there are other lesser falls.

- Sgwd Ddwli Uchaf – the 'upper gushing falls'.
- Sgwd Ddwli Isaf – the 'lower gushing falls'.
- Sgwd y Bedol – the 'horseshoe falls' which are in fact a series of three or four falls in quick succession.

=== On the Afon Pyrddin ===
- Sgwd Gwladus – spelled alternatively as Sgwd Gwladys, the falls are formed where the Afon Pyrddin drops 20 ft (6 m) over a lip of the 'Twelve Foot Sandstone'. The native Welsh name was anglicized to Lady's Falls before 1900, perhaps because of the likeness of the name's pronunciation but Gwladus is nevertheless a proper name, that of one of the many daughters of Brychan, the 5th-century King of Brycheinog. The sandstone tilts gently to the south so forcing the waters of the Pyrddin up against the foot of a high cliff of mudstone and over the left-hand side of the rock lip (when viewed from below). In higher water conditions the fall gradually extends further to the right. The upper surface of the sandstone is roughly patterned with the fossil roots of trees. A rocking stone (now dislodged) sits on this bench some 50 metres (160 ft) north of the falls.

Sgwd Gwladus 2014-07-30

- Sgwd Einion Gam – associated in legend with the 'lady' of Sgwd Gwladus, the 'fall of crooked Einion' is one of the most spectacular though least accessible of the falls of the area. The river drops 70 ft (21 m) into a plunge pool encircled by dark moss- and liverwort-covered cliffs. The falls have been created where the Pyrddin drops off the faulted edge of the Farewell Rock, a hard sandstone marking the base of the Carboniferous Coal Measures. The falls are difficult of access with only a rough path reaching them from the vicinity of Sgwd Gwladus downstream and requiring several tricky crossings of the river.

=== On other rivers ===
- Sychryd Cascade – the waters of Sychryd are here confined between the rocky walls of Craig-y-Ddinas (Dinas Rock) on the one hand and those of Bwa Maen ('stone bow') on the other. Thought not a single fall, the tumbling of the river over a jumble of rocks in its bed at this spot is sometimes referred to as the Sychryd Cascade or Sgydau Sychryd. This rocky slot has been eroded by the river along the line of the Neath Disturbance, a heavily faulted zone extending northeast to southwest. Tramways approach both from above and below and there was formerly a substantial metal ramp constructed over the cascades linking the two levels though this has long since been removed after it fell into disuse and became a safety hazard.

More falls occur in the section of the river above the cascade. These falls can be viewed from the north bank which is publicly accessible. A further small fall at Pwll y Crochan near where the A465 Heads of the Valleys Road crosses the river though this spot is not accessible to the public.

- Henrhyd Fall

The Nant Llech rises on the southern slopes of Carreg Cadno and flows to the village of Coelbren at which point it drops 90 feet (27 m) over the lip of a faulted block of the Farewell Rock, a hard sandstone. This spectacular site and section of the gorge below the falls is owned and managed by the National Trust. The waterfall is referred to in Welsh as Sgwd Henryd or as Rhaeadr Henryd.

- Aberdulais Falls

The Dulais rises near the coalmining town of Aberdulais/Seven Sisters and flows for several miles to join the waters of the River Neath at Aberdulais. The falls are set only 160 yards (150 metres) up the river from that confluence (at OS grid ref SS772995) and are readily accessible from the A465 road which runs the length of the Vale of Neath. Not only is this a spectacular fall but also an important industrial heritage site which is now in the care of the National Trust.

- Melincourt Falls

Melin Court Brook rises on the high ground to the southeast of Resolven in the Vale of Neath. It drops from the plateau surface above 450 metres (1,480 ft) above sea level to the floor of the Vale of Neath at around 30 metres (98 ft) in the space of just under 5 kilometres (3.1 mi). Several falls occur over its course but the single big drop of 80 feet (24 m) at Melincourt (OS grid ref SN826016) is the most spectacular and has drawn visitors for over 200 years since it was painted by Turner in 1794.

The falls (otherwise known as Melincwrt Falls), can be viewed from above, where a minor public road bridges the brook immediately upstream of the drop, and from below by means of a footpath which runs up beside the brook from the B4334 road between Melincourt village and Resolven.

The falls are contained within a 13-acre (5 ha) nature reserve managed by the Wildlife Trust of South and West Wales. Neath Port Talbot County Borough Council provide car parking beside the road at the start of the path up the falls.

== Information and interpretation for visitors ==
The Brecon Beacons National Park Authority established a visitor centre at Pontneddfechan in 2008 making use of a building previously used by Neath Port Talbot County Borough Council as a tourist information centre. Renamed as the Waterfalls Centre, it was staffed throughout the year to provide information for visitors to Waterfall Country, the wider national park and the Fforest Fawr Geopark. The Authority announced it was to close permanently on 6 June 2016 after a 4.7% cut in funding to the park authority. There were plans in 2017 to convert the centre into a cafe. The cafe is now operational and offers some information on the area to its clients. There is a smaller visitor facility a few miles to the north operated by the National Park Authority at Cwm Porth near Ystradfellte.

The National Trust operate a centre at Aberdulais Falls which performs a similar role.

== See also ==
- List of waterfalls
