= Melincourt Falls =

Waterfall in Neath Port Talbot, Wales

Coordinates: 51.7014°N 3.7008°W

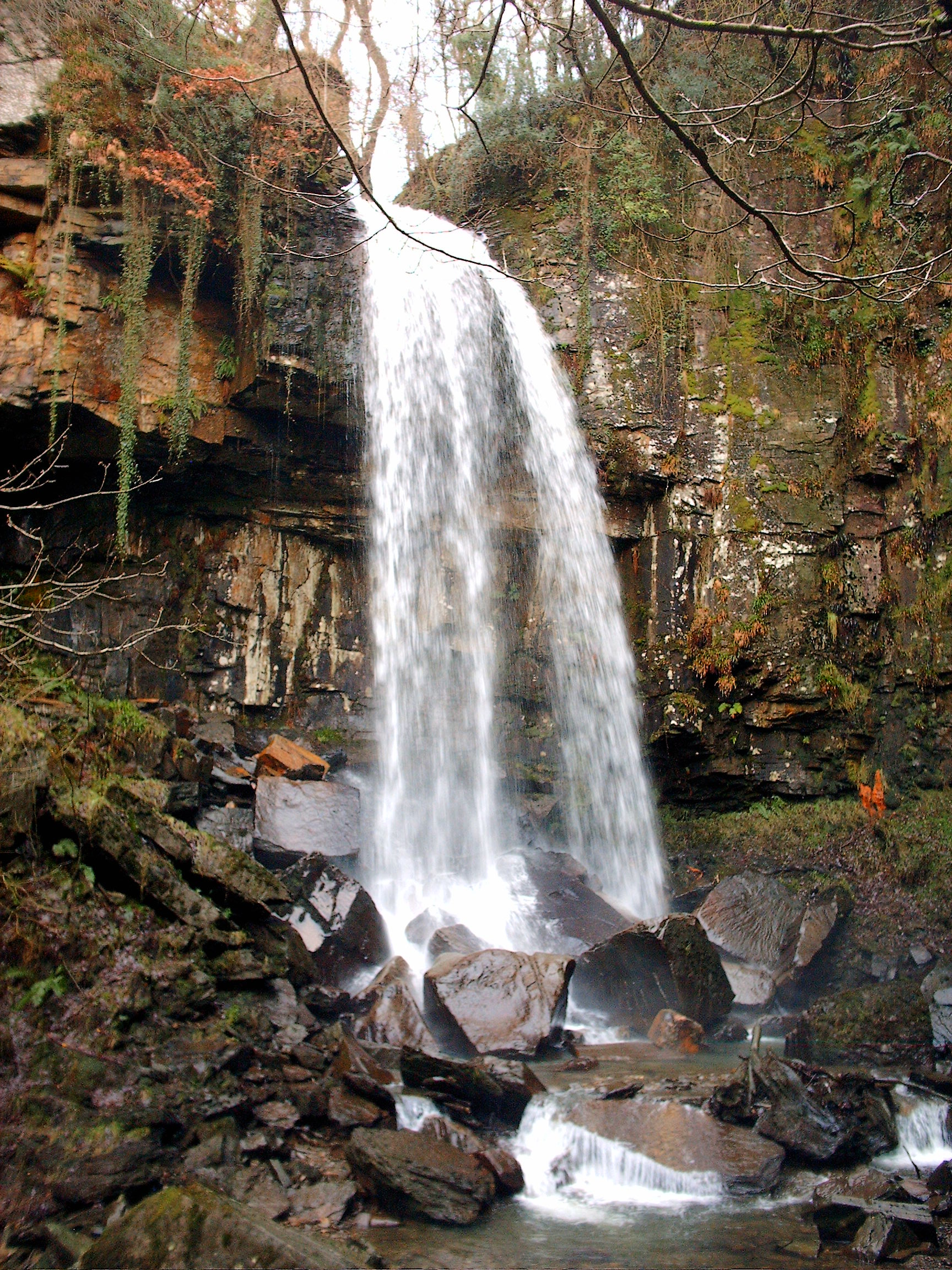
Melincourt Falls

Melincourt Falls (Welsh: Sgwd Rhyd yr Hesg) is an 80 feet (24 m) high waterfall on Melin Court Brook, a left-bank tributary of the River Neath / Afon Nedd, located 1-mile (1.6 km) south of Resolven in the county borough of Neath Port Talbot, south Wales. It is formed where the brook plunges over a resistant band of 'Lower Pennant Sandstone' in a 13 acres (5.3 ha) nature reserve managed by the Wildlife Trust of South and West Wales. The falls have been drawing visitors for at least two centuries – they are certainly known to have inspired J. M. W. Turner to paint them in 1794. The falls are considered by some to constitute a part of Waterfall Country though the bulk of these falls are a few miles further northeast at the head of the Vale of Neath.

== Visitor facilities ==
It can be accessed by the public footpath from the B4434 Resolven to Tonna Road, 1-mile (1.6 km) south of Resolven. The entrance to the path is on the opposite side of the road from the public car park. The falls (otherwise known as Melincwrt Falls), can also be viewed from above where a minor public road bridges the brook immediately upstream of the drop.

== Gallery ==
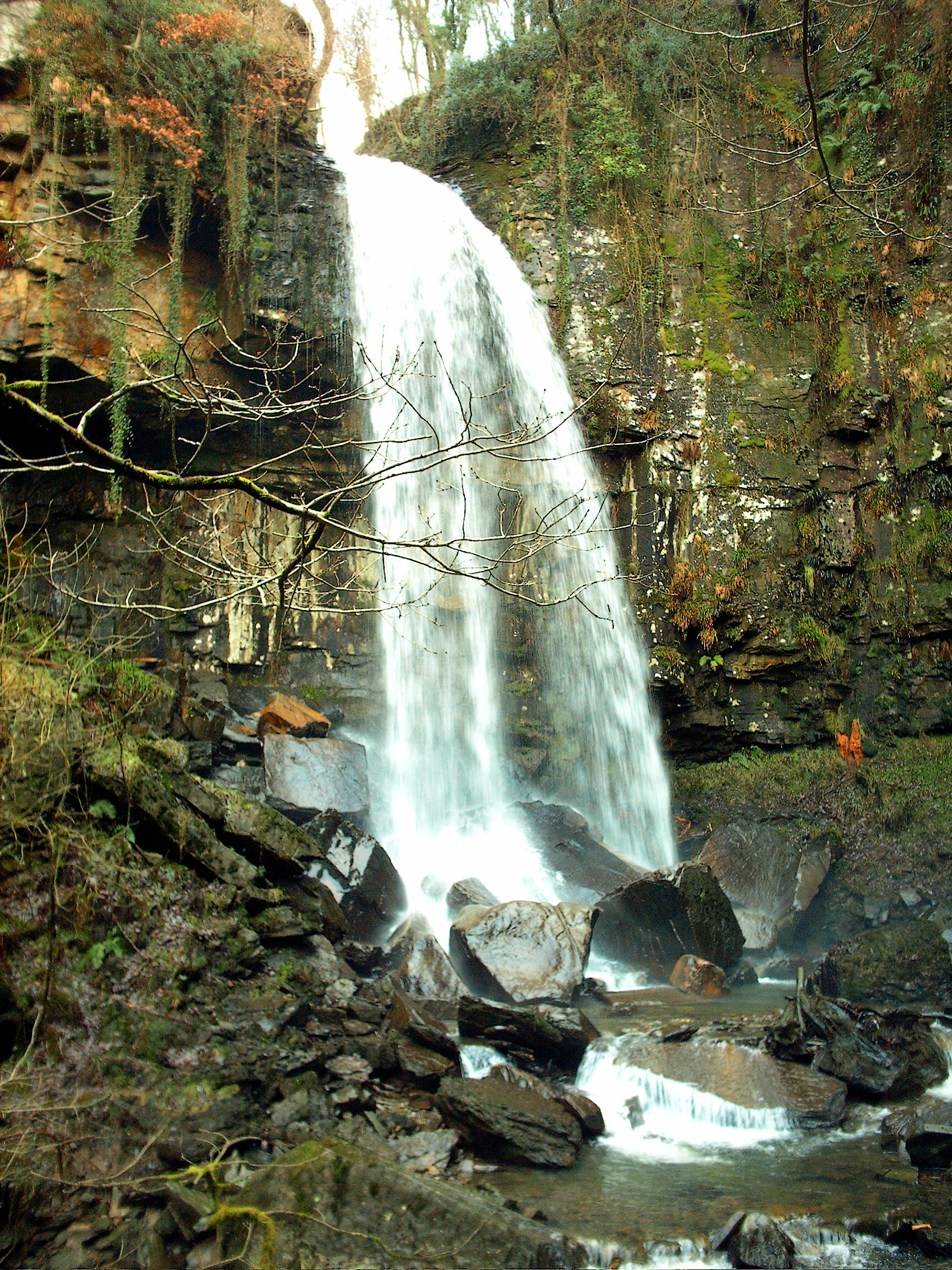
Melincourt Falls in December

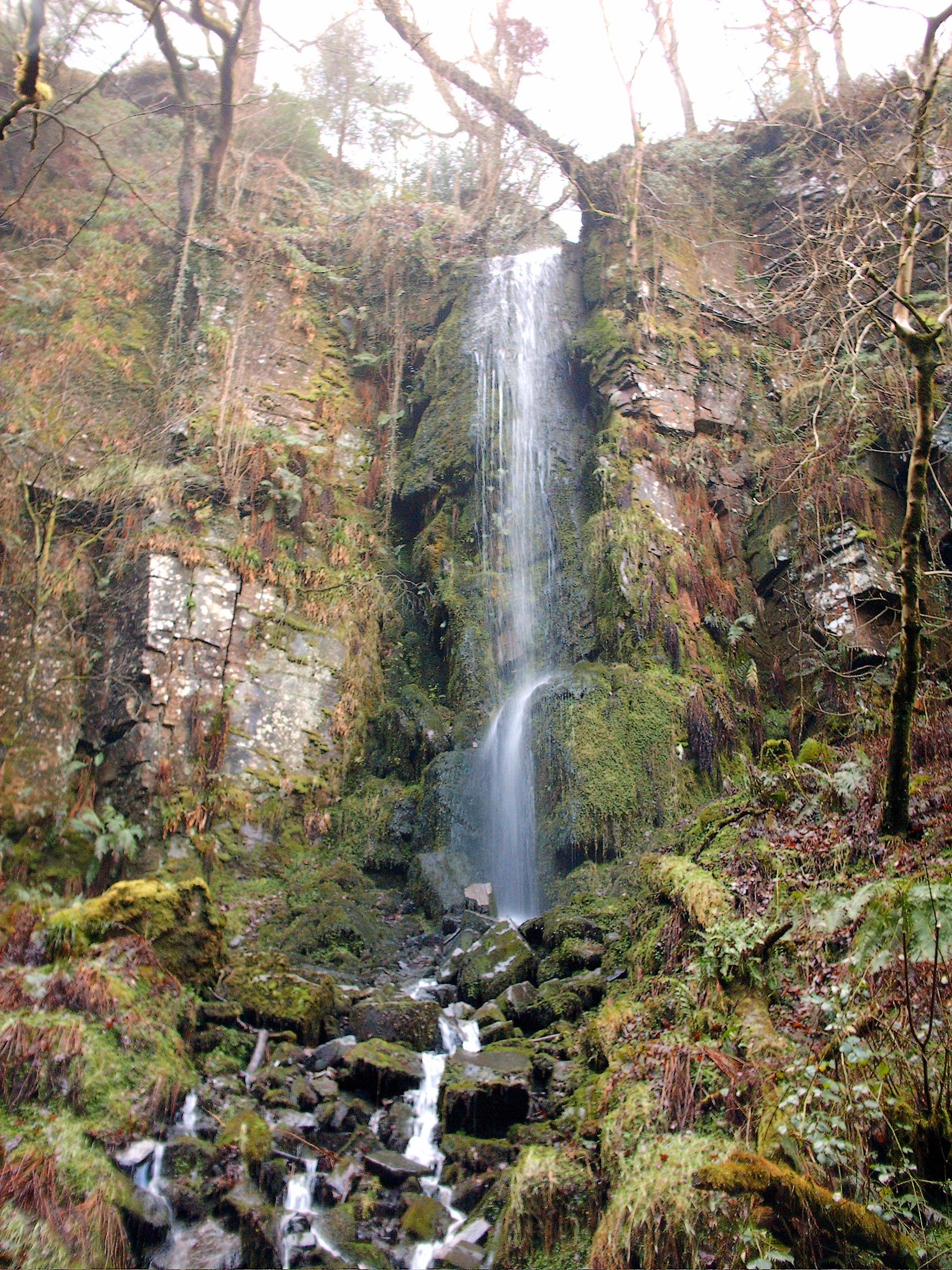
The secondary falls, beside the main waterfall

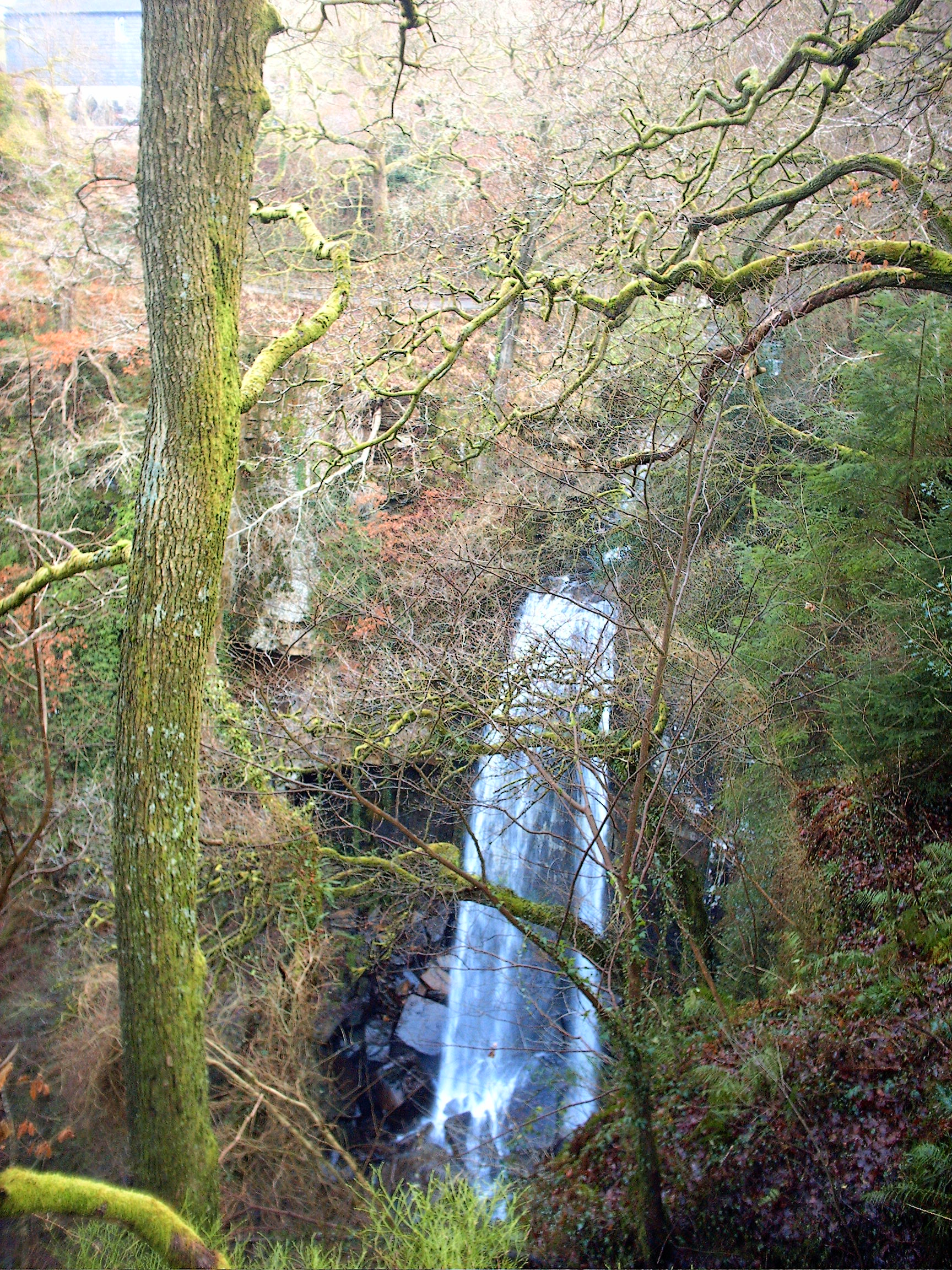
The Falls from the surrounding woodlands

== See also ==
- List of waterfalls
- List of waterfalls in Wales
