= Evan Bevan =

Welsh satirical poet (1803–1866)

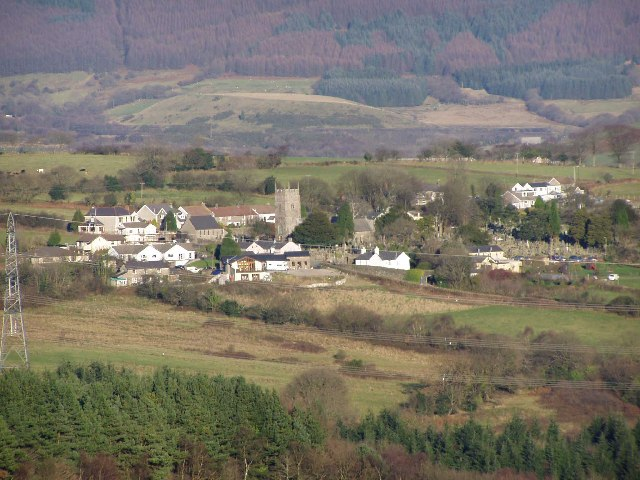
Llangynwyd

Evan Bevan (1803–1866) was a Welsh writer of satirical verse in the Welsh language.

== Life and work ==
Bevan was born into a poor family: his parents were William and Gwenllian Bevan of Llangynwyd, Glamorgan. As a young adult he moved to Ystradfellte, Brecknockshire and married there Ann Ifan, a butcher's daughter. He later moved to the Pontneathvaughan area.

Bevan gained a mainly local reputation as a writer of satirical verse under the pseudonym Ianto'r Castell, some of which is archived at the National Library of Wales. He died at Pontneathvaughan in October 1866.
