= Ffynnon Llugwy =

Natural reservoir in Snowdonia, North Wales

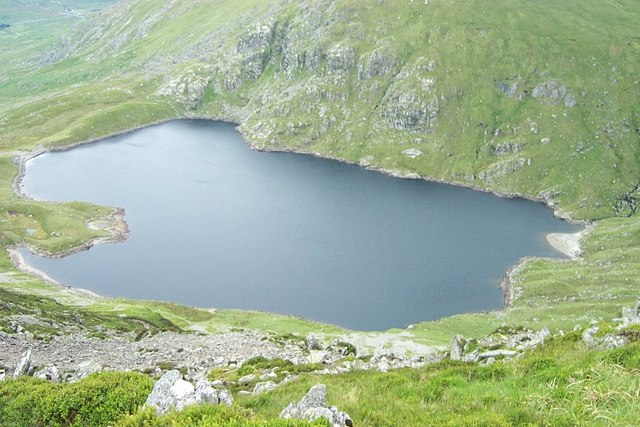
- looking south

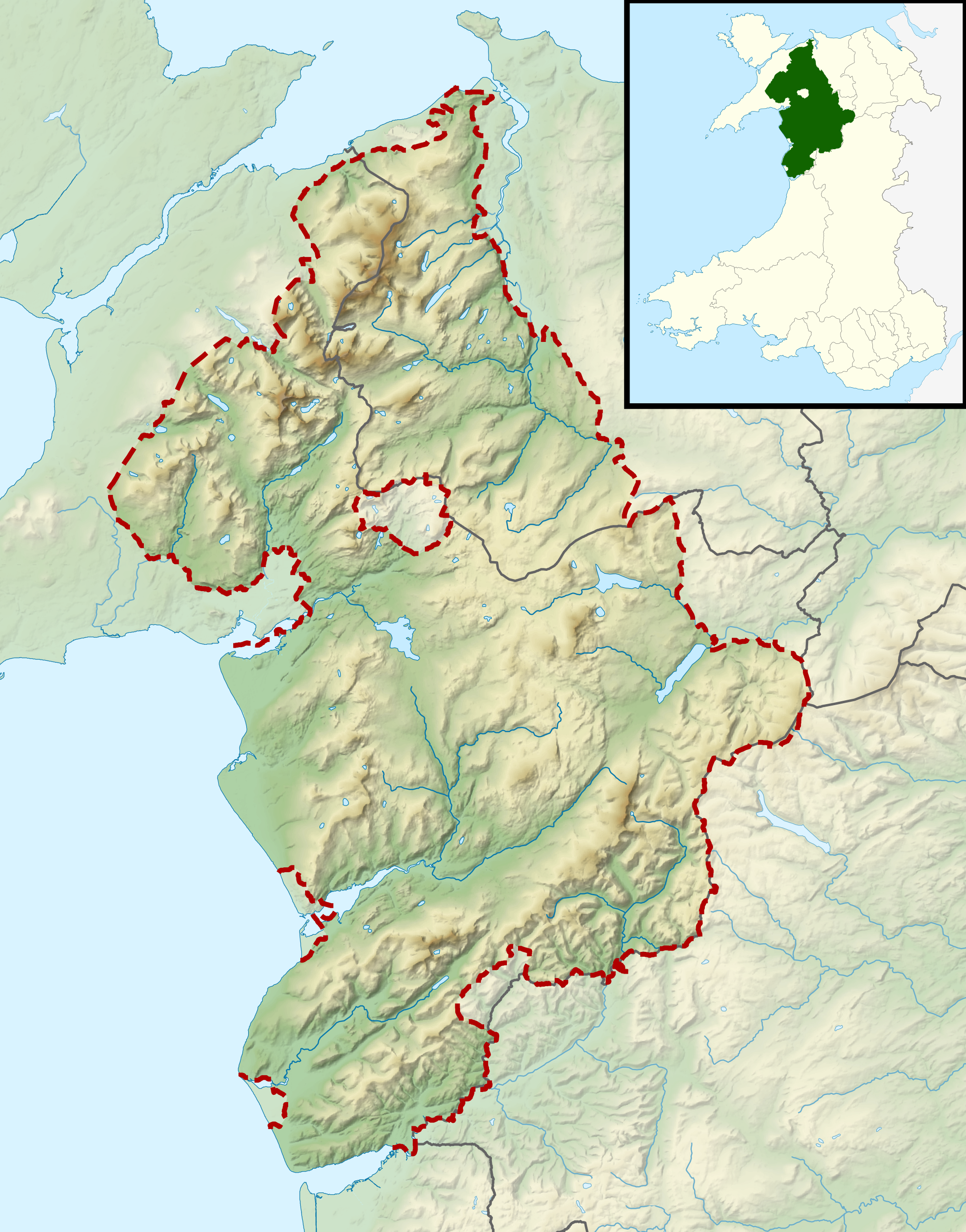
- Location within Snowdonia
- Location: Snowdonia, North Wales
- Coordinates: 53°8′45″N 3°57′23″W
- Type: natural, reservoir
- Primary outflows: Afon Llugwy
- Basin countries: United Kingdom
- Surface area: 40 acres (16.19 ha)

Ffynnon Llugwy is a lake in the Carneddau range of mountains in Snowdonia, North Wales.

It lies at a height of about 1,786 feet (544 m) and covers an area of some 40 acres (16.19 ha). It has a maximum depth of 146 ft (45 m).

Since the early twentieth century water has been taken from its outflow, the River Llugwy to feed Llyn Cowlyd via a series of leats.

Since the mid-1970s the lake has additionally acted as a reservoir for Bangor and eastern Anglesey, which necessitated the laying of a pipeline some 11 mi (18 km) long to the water treatment works at Mynydd Llandygai.

It is the source of the River Llugwy which flows via Capel Curig and Betws-y-Coed before becoming a tributary of the River Conwy.
