= Afon Hepste =

River in Powys, Wales

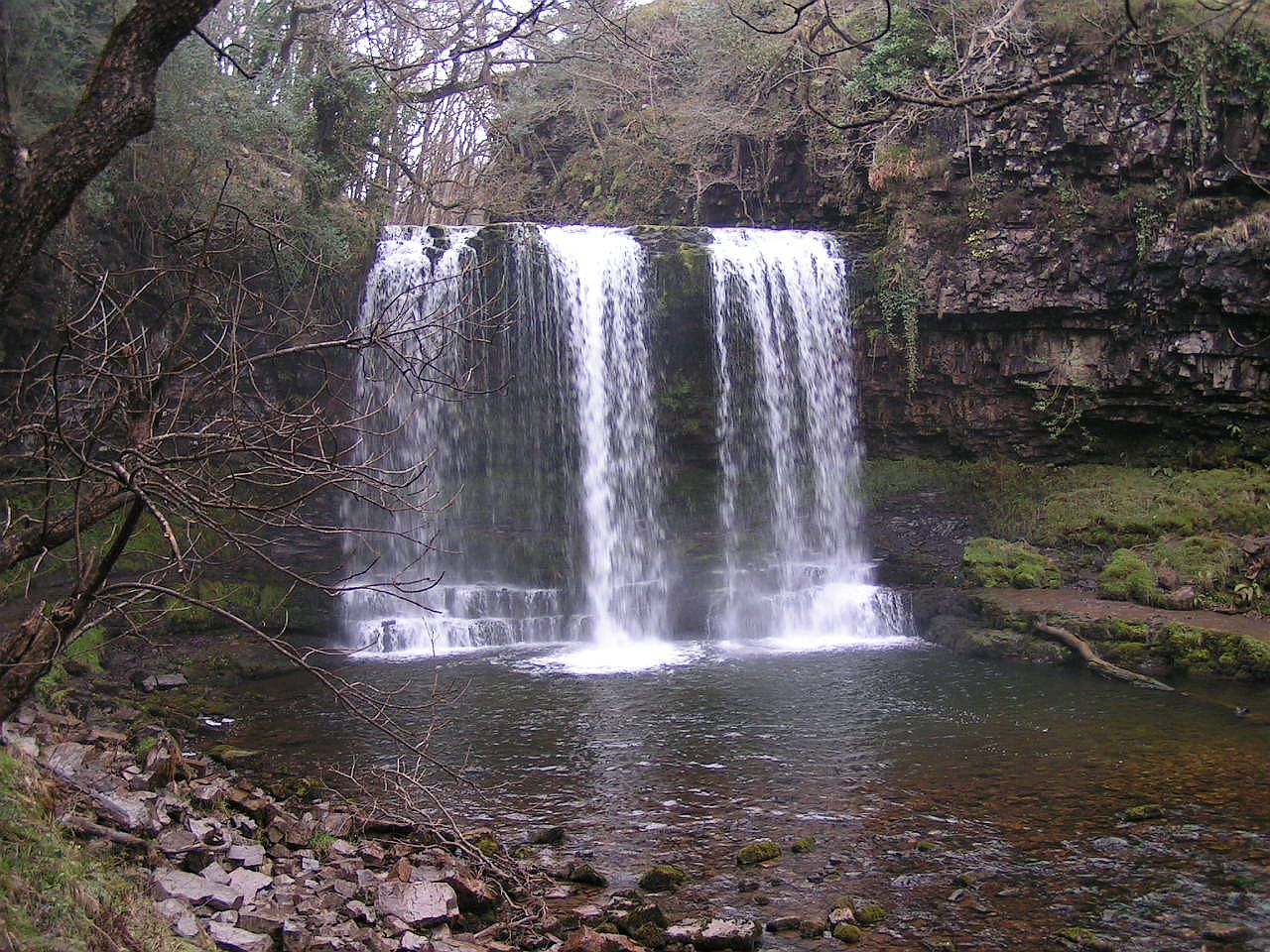
- Sgwd yr Eira, Afon Hepste

Location
- Country: Wales
- State: Powys

Physical characteristics
- Source: Fan Fawr
  - coordinates: 51°51′35″N 3°30′10″W
- Mouth: Afon Mellte
  - coordinates: 51°46′38″N 3°33′38″W

Afon Hepste (Welsh pronunciation: [ˈhɛpstɛ]) is a river in Powys, Wales, though partly forming the county's border with Rhondda Cynon Taf. It runs wholly within the Brecon Beacons National Park.

Its headwaters, the Afon y Waun, Nant y Cwrier and Nant Hepste Fechan, rise on the Old Red Sandstone dip-slopes of Fforest Fawr and combine to form the Afon Hepste near the farmstead of Hepste Fechan. It enters onto the Carboniferous Limestone outcrop near this point and sections of its course downstream remain dry in all but flood conditions as the flow disappears underground. The river flows over the Millstone Grit outcrop from some way beyond Hepste Bridge.

The Hepste plunges over a band of resistant gritstone to form Sgwd yr Eira (translated from Welsh as 'fall of snow'). A public footpath runs behind this fall, making it one of the most popular destinations in an area that has become known as Waterfall Country. One mile downstream of the fall, the river joins the Afon Mellte near to the village of Ystradfellte.

== See also ==
- List of waterfalls
- List of waterfalls in Wales
