= Rhaeadr y Cwm =

Waterfall in Wales

- Waterfall of the Cwm
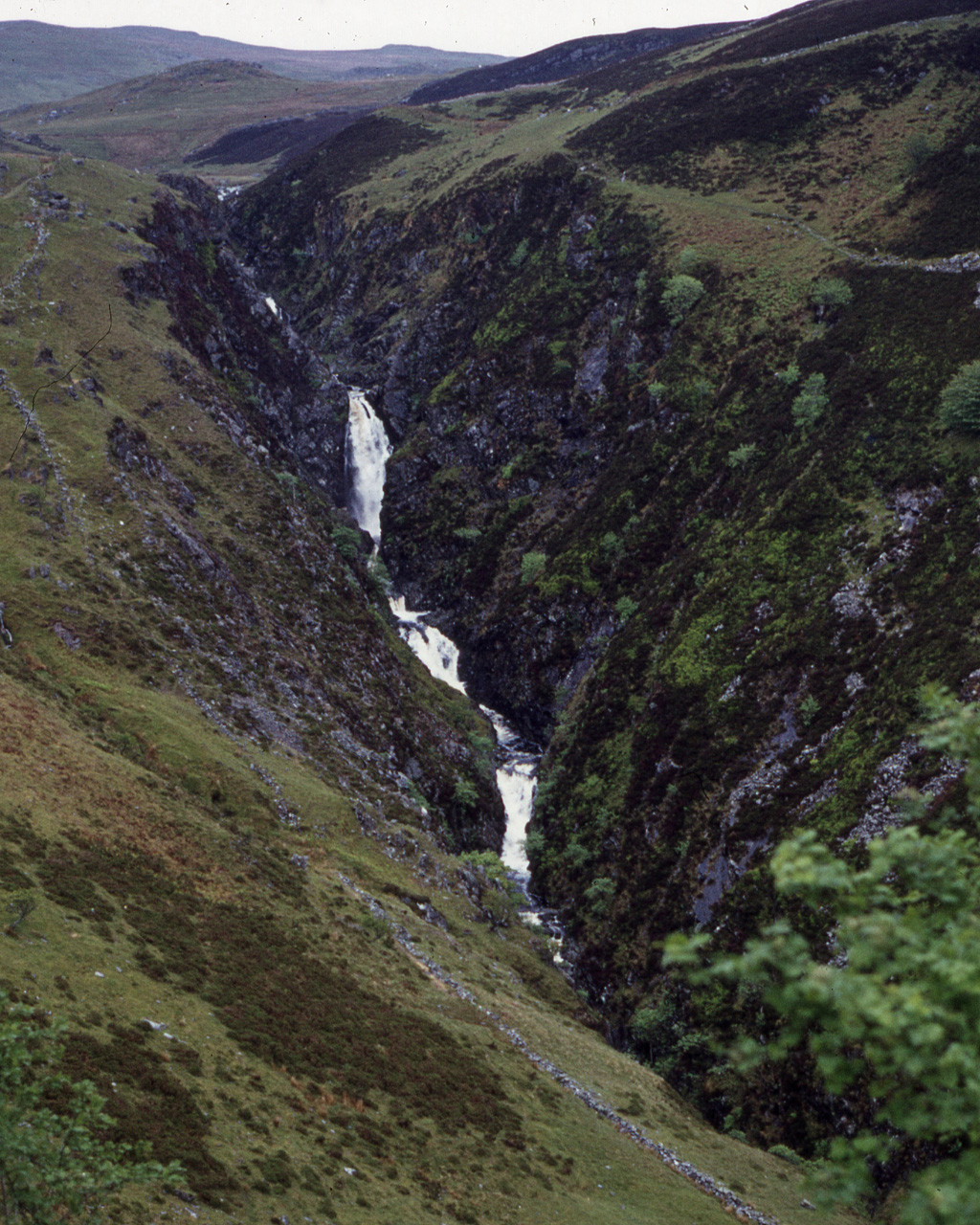
- Rhaeadr y Cwm
- Location: Gwynedd, Wales
- Coordinates: 52.957°N 3.877°W
- Total height: 400 feet (120 m)
- Number of drops: Six

The Rhaeadr y Cwm is a waterfall on the Afon Cynfal river in Gwynedd, North Wales. The falls are located near the B4391 road, some 3 miles (5 km) east of Ffestiniog.

== Description ==
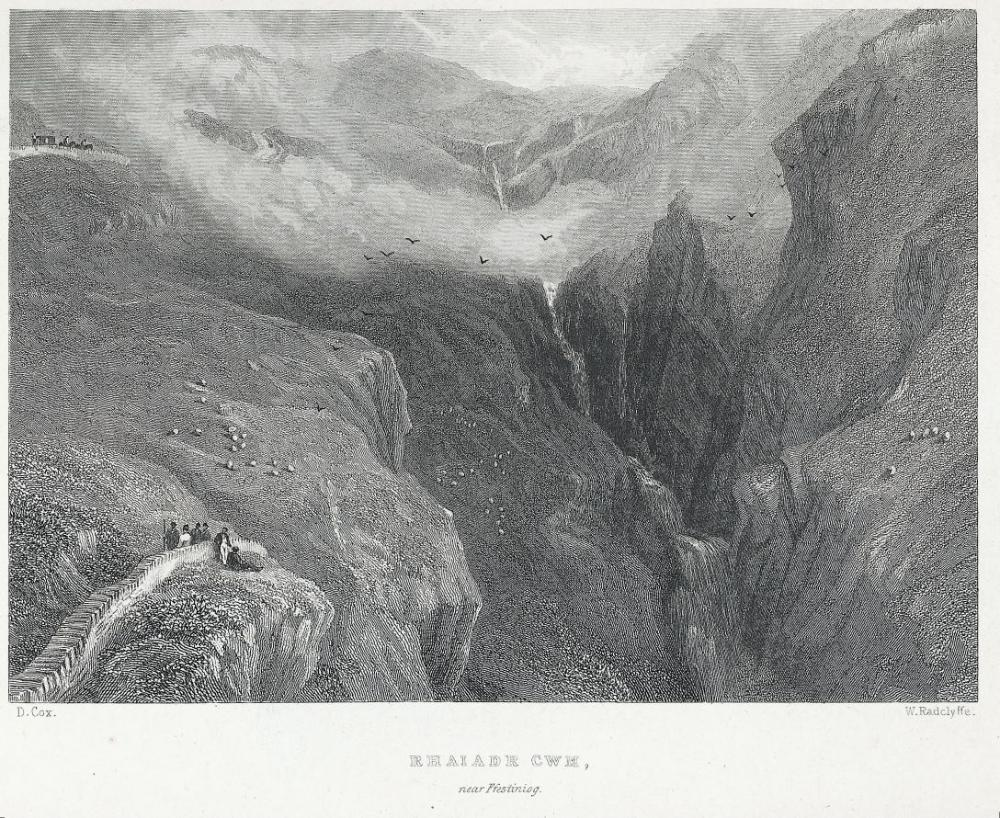
Rhaiadr Cwm, (by David Cox)

Rhaeadr y Cwm is located at SH736415 on the Afon Cynfal river, a watercourse that drains Migneint (to the east), an area of upland covering over 47,000 acres (19,000 ha). The river drops about 400 feet (120 m) as it flows through the gorge which separates the upland from the lowland course of the river. The waterfall's run covers a cascade of six steps through a narrow gorge.

The waterfall can be viewed from a lay-by on the adjacent B4391 road (SH732418) between the A470 and A4212 roads. Due to the nature of heavy rainfall on the long falls over a steep drop, it has been described as "..one of the most spectacular waterfalls in Britain."

There is a proposal to build a weir above the waterfall and pipe some of the water away from a hydrolectric scheme. Those backing the scheme state that it will generate enough electricity to power 700 homes. Opponents say that up to 70% of the water will be diverted away from the falls, which will change the overall look of the waterfall. There are also concerns that the moisture-loving mosses and liverworts that line the gorge's sides will be affected by the water diversion.

Rhaeadr means waterfall in Welsh, and cwm means mountain hollow.

== See also ==
- List of waterfalls
- List of waterfalls in Wales
