= Swallow Falls =

Waterfall on the River Llugwy in Wales

- Rhaeadr y Wennol; Rhaeadr Ewynnol (Welsh)
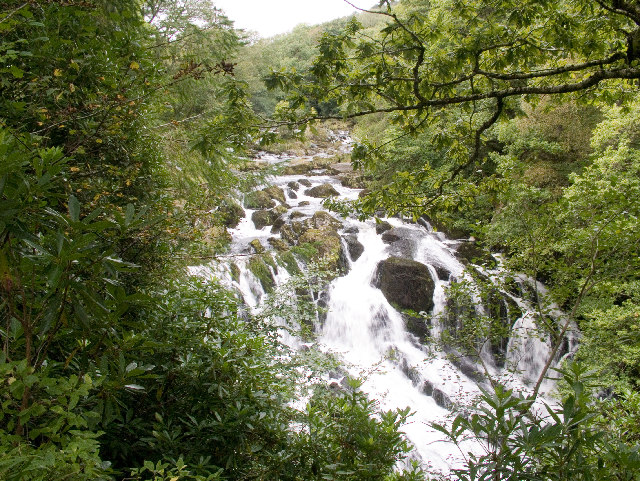
- Swallow Falls near Betws-y-Coed
- Interactive map of Swallow Falls
- Location: Conwy County Borough, Wales
- Coordinates: 53°06′09″N 3°50′48″W
- Type: Cascade
- Total height: 42 m (138 ft)
- Watercourse: Through limestone hard rock

Swallow Falls (Welsh: Rhaeadr y Wennol; 'the waterfall of the swallow'; or Rhaeadr Ewynnol; 'the foaming waterfall') is a multiple waterfall system in Wales, on the River Llugwy near Betws-y-Coed in Conwy County Borough.

== Name ==
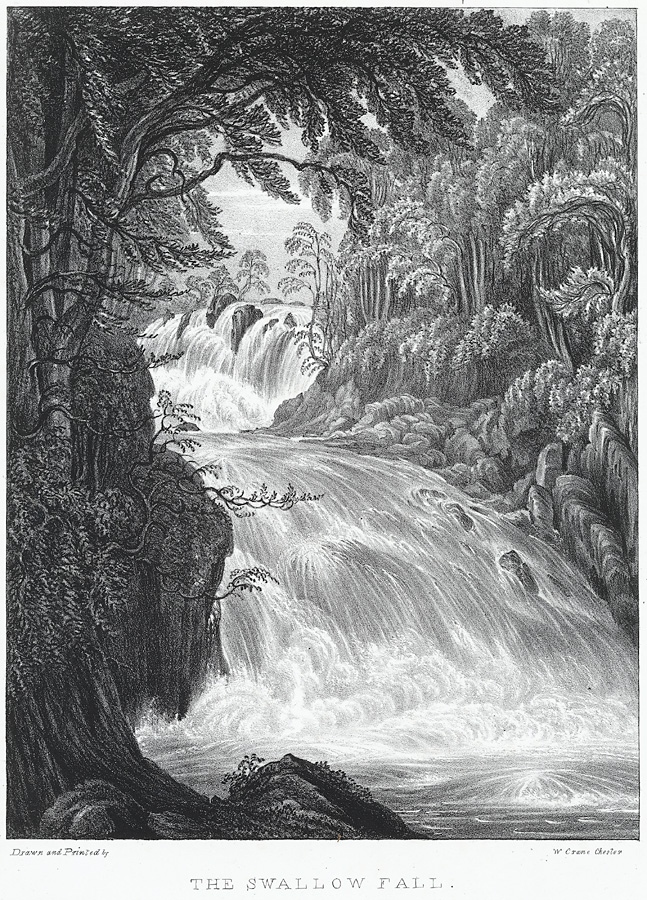
The Swallow Fall by W Crane of Chester, c. 1840

The name Rhaeadr y Wennol (Welsh for 'the waterfall of the swallow') derives from the fact that the flow of the river is separated by a prominent rock into two streams of water that look like a swallow's tail. The similar sounding Rhaeadr Ewynnol (Welsh for 'the foaming waterfall') is a later coinage based on the adjective ewynnol 'foaming', which itself seems to have been coined at the end of the eighteenth century.

It has been suggested that this name was 'prompted by a desire to demonstrate W[elsh] linguistic ownership of a popular tourist attraction and a concern that Rhaeadr y Wennol would be perceived as a deferential translation of what came to be the better known name Swallow Falls'. The name, in its variant forms, is attested from the 1770s onwards.

== History ==
It was suggested in 1899 that the falls could be used to generate electricity for the nearby village of Betws-y-Coed, as well as overhead lighting for the falls. In 1913 the second Lord Ancaster, the landowner, gave the Swallow Falls to the local council, who decided to charge for visiting it to pay off some of the £15,000 debt incurred through the installation of water and electricity supplies to the village. Once the debt of costs of installation was cleared the parish retained the fee, resulting in Betws-y-Coed having the lowest rates in the country. By the 1930s, the waterfall had become a popular tourist destination, although there were few visitors during the winter off-season. A writer in the Yorkshire Post and Leeds Intelligencer on 17 January 1933, described the waterfall as coming "over the rocks in a perfect torrent, peerless white in the dusk."

In 1939, Richard Morris, the former chairman of the local council, was charged with making false entries in the upkeep of the tolls. There was a total deficiency of £67 15s 6d; by the time the charge was laid, Morris had already repaid the sum. The cheap water and electricity rates ended after local government reorganisation in 1974.

== See also ==
- List of waterfalls
- List of waterfalls in Wales
