= Afon Rheidol =

River in Ceredigion, Wales

Afon Rheidol River Rheidol
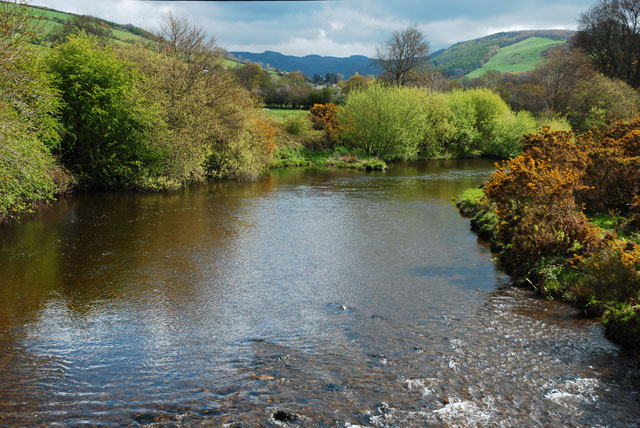
- Afon Rheidol near Capel Bangor in spring

Location
- Country: Wales
- Principal area: Ceredigion

Physical characteristics
- Source: Nant-y-moch Reservoir, Ceredigion, Wales
- Mouth: Cardigan Bay
  - location: Aberystwyth, Ceredigion
- Length: 19 mi (31 km)

Afon Rheidol (Welsh for 'River Rheidol', Welsh pronunciation: [ˈr̥ei̯dɔl]) is a river in Ceredigion, Wales, 19 miles (31 km) in length. The source is Plynlimon. Receiving an average annual rainfall of over 1,800mm, Plynlimon is also the source of both the Wye and the Severn.

== Geography and geology ==
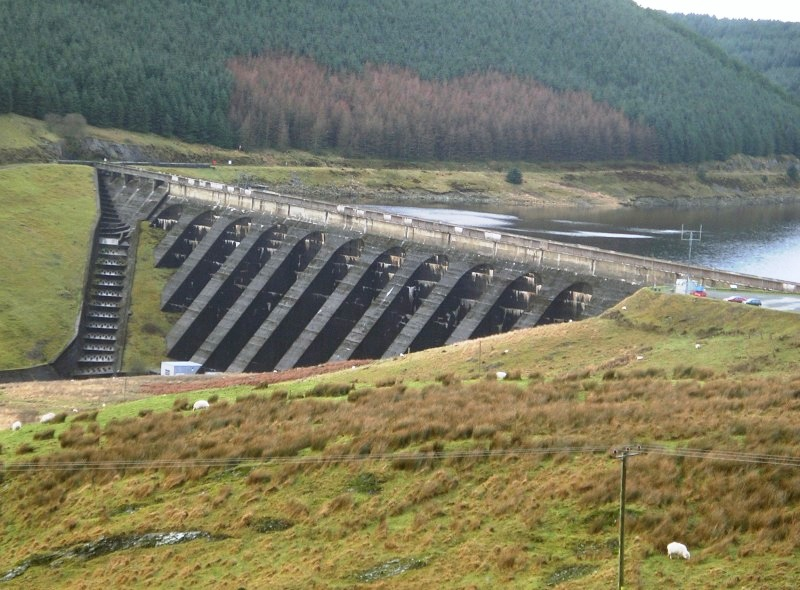
Nant-y-moch dam

Originally formed at the confluence of Afon Hengwm and Afon Llechwedd-mawr, the Rheidol now emerges as the outflow of Nant-y-moch Reservoir (52.4590°N 3.8349°W) on the western flanks of Plynlimon, near the sources of the Wye and Severn. After flowing south to Ponterwyd in the increasingly deep valley, then southwest through Welsh Oak ancient woodland, it veers westwards to its confluence with Afon Mynach, at Devil's Bridge, Ceredigion (Welsh: Pontarfynach, 'bridge on the Mynach'), and a spectacular waterfall. The river continues, passing the abandoned workings of the Cwm Rheidol lead mine; one of many other metal mines in the valley – a source of extracted metal pollution of the river – and flows westwards before reaching its confluence with the River Ystwyth and the estuary at Aberystwyth to drain into Cardigan Bay. (52.4071°N 4.0898°W)

In the late 1960s, when the mine was closed, a major blowout of water contained in an adit coloured the whole river an ochre orange colour and greatly added to the concentrations of lead and zinc in the river. Today, management of water still draining from the mine is by the use of constructed wetlands. Previous management had included a limestone filter bed installed in the 1960s and now redundant. The filter bed is still in place and can be seen from the road.

The reservoir is close to the site of the Battle of Mynydd Hyddgen (1401). The true geographical source of the river is difficult to determine. The traditional source is Llyn Llygad Rheidol, a lake in a high valley near the summit of Pen Pumlumon Fawr, as its name suggests ('Rheidol's eye lake'); the stream Nant y Llyn descends from it into Afon Hengwm, but is not a substantial stream. There are several other, larger streams, such as Afon Hengwm, which rises to the south of Llyn Bugeilyn, just across the boundary in Powys. Afon Llechwedd-mawr rises near Llyn Penrhaeadr and marks the boundary between Ceredigion and Powys along most of its course. There are some other lesser streams, including Nant y Moch, after which the reservoir is named.

== Welsh mythology ==
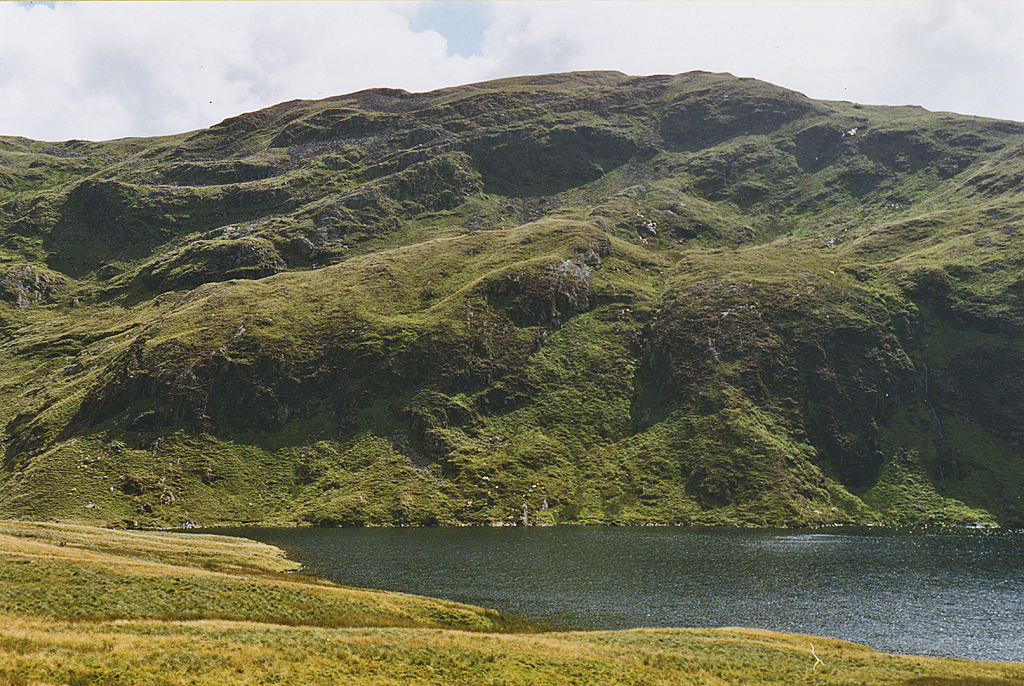
"Father Plynlimon", the mountain from which "the three sisters", Gwy (the river Wye), Hafren (the river Severn) and Rheidolyn make their way to the sea

The river is one of "the three sisters" of Welsh mythology, first recorded by John Rhŷs as a legend told to him when he was growing up in 1840s Ponterwyd, Ceredigion. In the legend, "Rheidolyn" and her two sisters, Gwy (the river Wye) and Hafren (the river Severn) all rise from "Father Plynlimon" (the mountain upon which the three rivers have their sources), with each sister choosing a different direction to make their way to the sea.

The legend was retold throughout the 19th and 20th centuries, with Arthur Granville Bradley giving a detailed version and analysis in 1920. Bradley states that the god of the mountain was indeed father to three daughters, however in this version each daughter is given a single day to reach the sea, with their father promising all the territory they can cover before dark as a dowery. Rheidolyn, the youngest sister was an "incorrigible lie-a-bed" and was awakened by her father in the middle of the day. The father rebuked Rheidolyn, telling her that both her sisters had left hours ago, heading east and south towards the sea which would now be named for the victorious sister, Môr Hafren (the Bristol Channel). However as her position on Plynlimon was far to the west Rheidolyn had knowledge that her sisters did not. She had often viewed the valleys that led westward and had come to believe that another sea lay much closer to her. Rheidolyn left immediately, sprinting westward down the mountains and bounding over rocks at great speed. She reached the sea well before her sisters or the sunset, winning her dowery and finding her lover waiting for her there. Bradley also records that the legend gave rise to a Welsh saying: "There is no impossibility, saith Rheidolyn, to the maiden who has a fortune to lose or a lover to gain".

== Economy ==
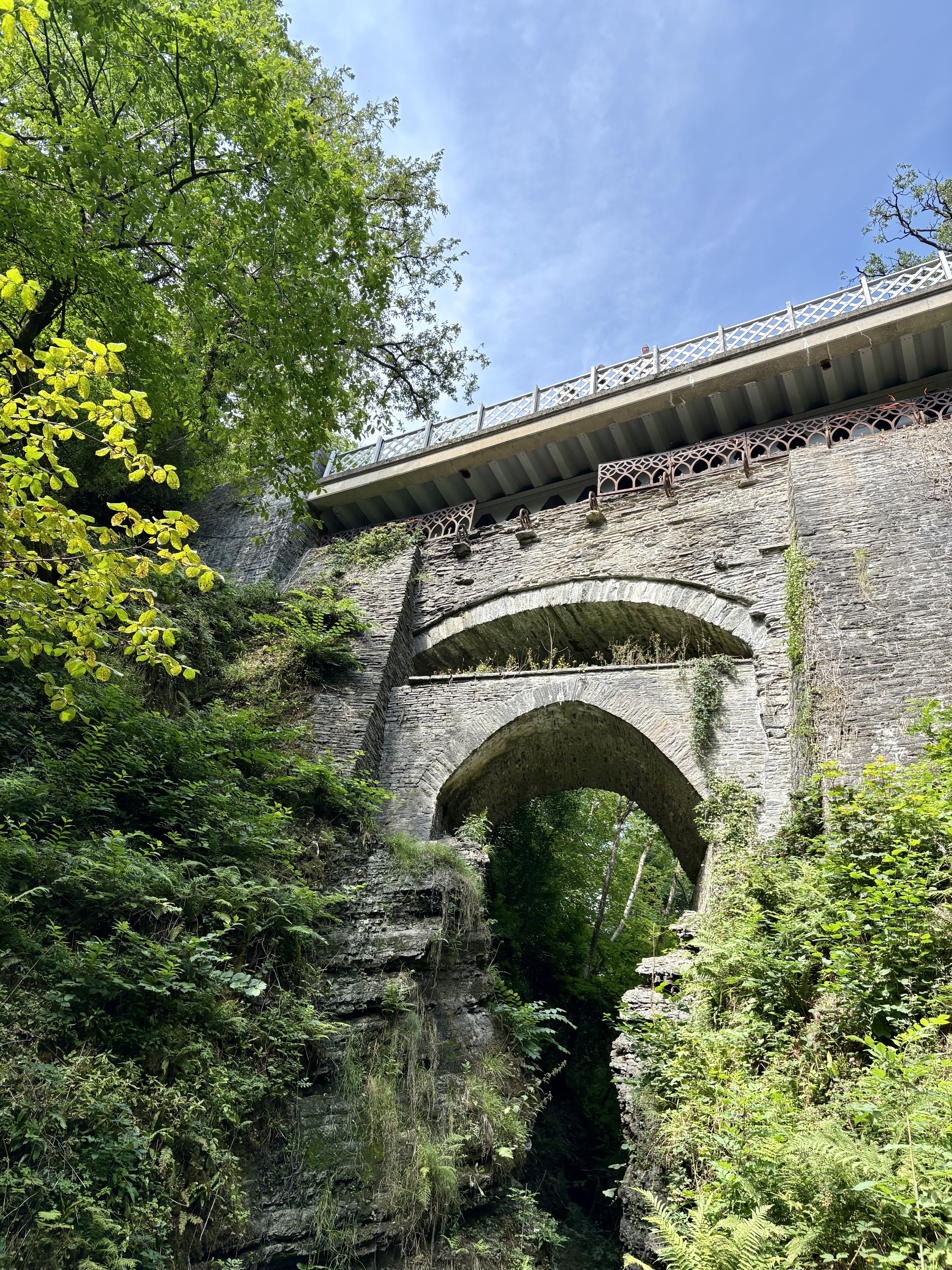
The three bridges at Devil's Bridge spanning the Mynach gorge, looking downstream

For many centuries the economy of the Rheidol valley had been based on metal mining. This has now been replaced by forestry, tourism and the farming of beef, dairy cattle and sheep.

There are a number of tourist attractions in the Rheidol valley. These include the village of Devil's Bridge and the Mynach Falls, where three bridges, each built over the previous, span the top of a spectacular gorge.

Between Devil's Bridge and Aberystwyth runs a narrow-gauge steam railway, the Vale of Rheidol Railway. This was originally built to ship metal ore from the mines, but now provides a very popular tourist route to the top end of the Rheidol valley.

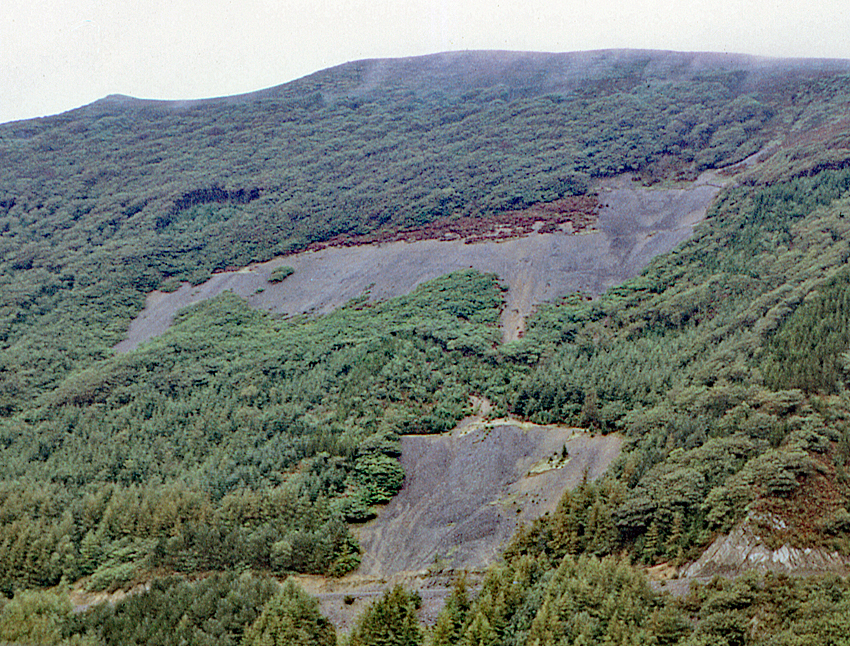
Rheidol Stag, formed by mining waste tipped down the hill side.

A large stag-like shape on the northern valley wall, above the Cwm Rheidol reservoir, known as the "White Stag", is traditionally said to be a hill figure but it is in fact an industrial feature, formed by the waste from lead mining at Gellireirin. The landmark has been visible for more than 100 years.

== Environment ==
The catchment of the Rheidol is dominated by the western maritime exposure of this part of Wales. Rainfall levels are high and ecosystems reflect both high rainfall and the acidic nature of the underlying rocks. Combined with the acid mine drainage from abandoned silver and lead mines that sit within the catchment (the area around Aberystwyth contains 38 of the 50 worst polluting metal mines in Wales), by 1991 the river had regularly broken EEC pollution limits for heavy metal contamination such as zinc.

Upland Molinia spp. grassland is common growing on deep deposits of peat. Within the valleys, dense and ancient oak forests with rich understoreys of ferns, mosses and lichens are common. In the valley bottom, glacial and alluvial deposits have been worked by man into low intensive agriculture.
