= Afon Mynach =

River in Ceredigion, Wales

Afon Mynach River Mynach
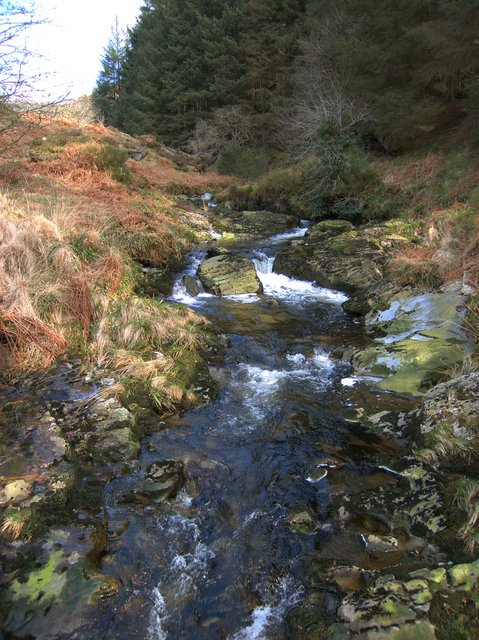
- Upper Mynach

Location
- Sovereign state: United Kingdom
- Country: Wales
- Principal area: Ceredigion

Physical characteristics
- Source confluence: Confluence with Nant Rhuddnant and Afon Myherin
  - coordinates: 52.382879°N 3.809375°W
- Mouth: Afon Rheidol
  - location: Devil's Bridge, Ceredigion
  - coordinates: 52.379018°N 3.850681°W

Afon Mynach (Welsh for 'River Mynach', Welsh pronunciation: [ˈmənaχ]) is a river in Ceredigion, Wales.

Its source is at the meeting of two smaller rivers, the Nant Rhuddnant and Afon Myherin. Both of these streams have their sources in lakes high in the Cambrian Mountains:

- Afon Myherin flows from two lakes known collectively as Llynnoedd Ieuan;
- the much larger Nant Rhuddnant passes through Llyn Rhuddnant, above which it is formed by the confluence of several smaller streams.

Afon Mynach is notable for the famous Mynach Falls in the village of Devil's Bridge (Pontarfynach), where the river plunges 90 metres into the gorge of Afon Rheidol. It is also famous for the three bridges built one on top of the other in the same village, the lowest of the three said to be built by the devil, hence the name of the bridge as Devil's Bridge, but most probably built by the monks of Strata Florida.
