= River Llugwy =

River in North Wales

Coordinates: 53°05′N 3°48′W

Llugwy
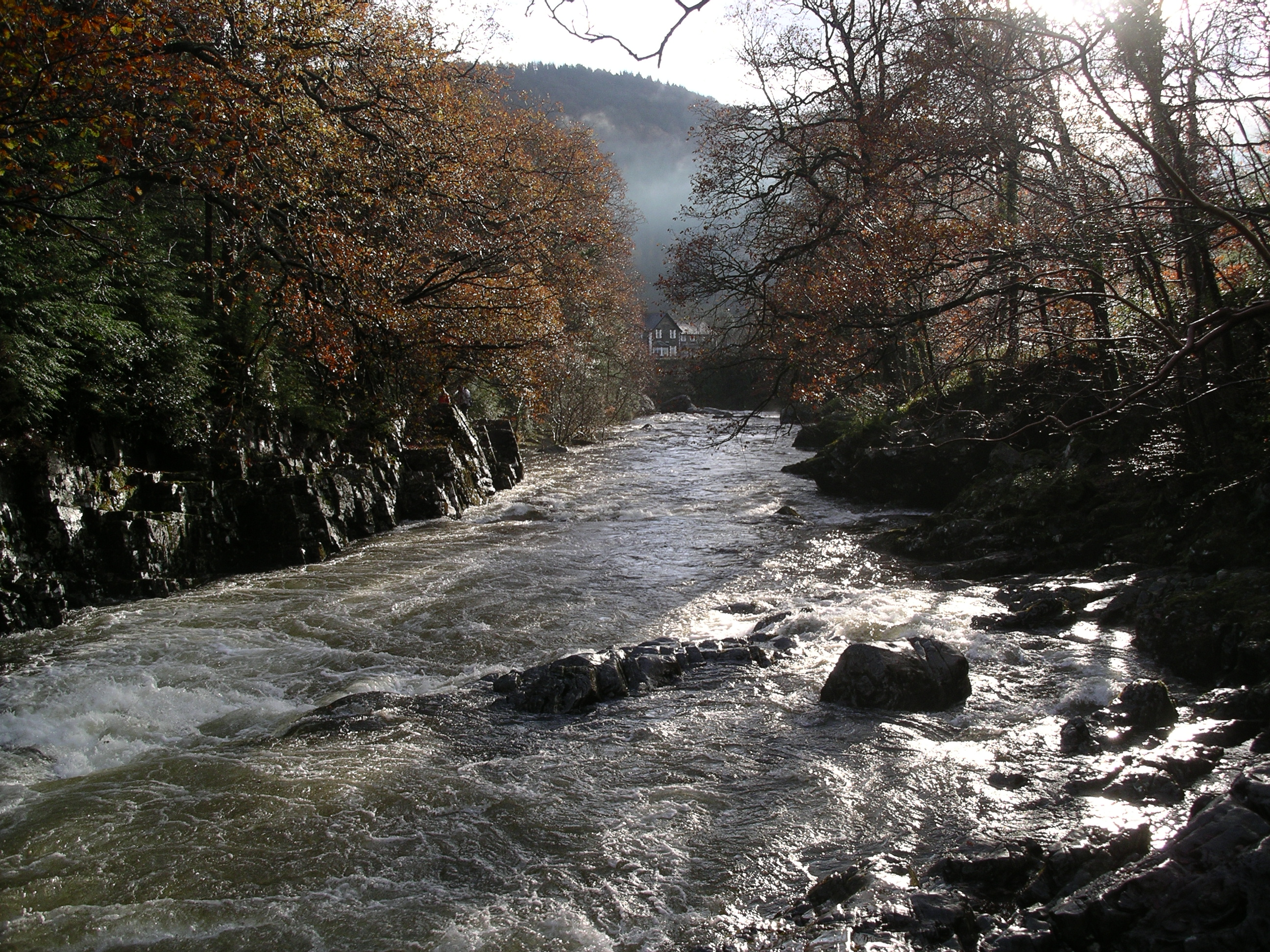
- River Llugwy upstream of Betws-y-Coed
- Native name: Afon Llugwy (Welsh)

Location
- Country: Wales

Physical characteristics
- Source
  - location: Ffynnon Llugwy
- Mouth
  - location: confluence with River Conwy
- Length: 40 km (25 mi)

River Llugwy (Welsh: Afon Llugwy) is a tributary of the River Conwy, and has its source at Ffynnon Llugwy, a lake in the Carneddau range of mountains in Snowdonia in north-west Wales.

== Location and catchment area ==
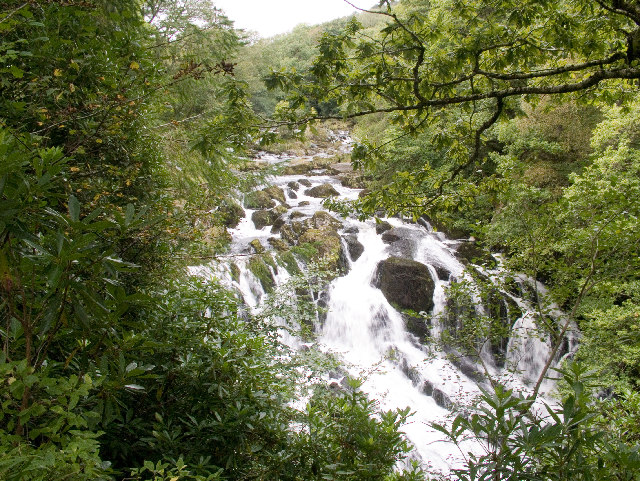
Swallow Falls, near Betws-y-Coed

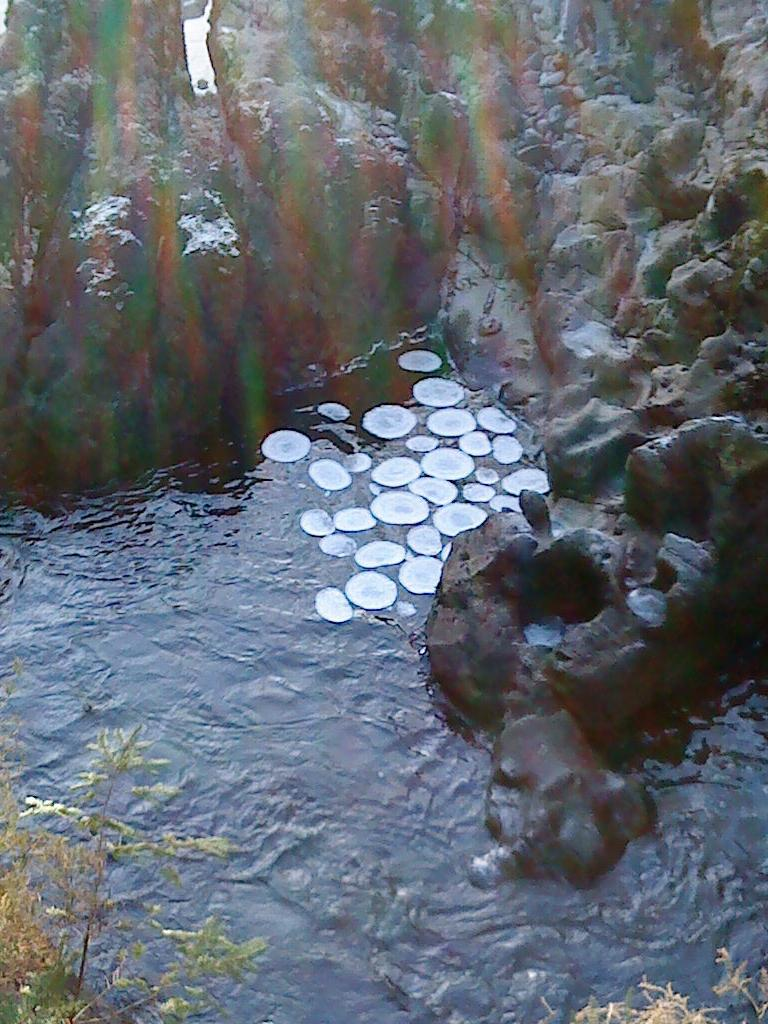
A rare phenomenon - ice circles in the River Llugwy at Betws-y-Coed

The average annual rainfall in the catchment of the Llugwy is the highest recorded in England and Wales.

The Llugwy largely follows the route of the A5, passing firstly through the village of Capel Curig, then on to fall over the Swallow Falls, a popular tourist attraction.

On entering Betws-y-Coed it is crossed by the Miner's Bridge, a curious wooden bridge set at a steep incline over the river, and shortly after passing under Pont-y-pair road bridge it flows beside the main street before its confluence with the Conwy at the northernmost end of the golf course.

== In landscape painting ==
The Llugwy was a favourite of many well-known Victorian artists such as Frederick William Hulme. The scenery around its banks was the subject of a number of important British paintings, including several included in Royal Academy exhibits. River Llugwy was a place of death of the painter James William Whittaker (1828–1876), who fell there trying to collect his painting gear and drowned.
