= Nedd Fechan =

River in Powys, Wales

Coordinates: 51°46′16″N 3°35′43″W

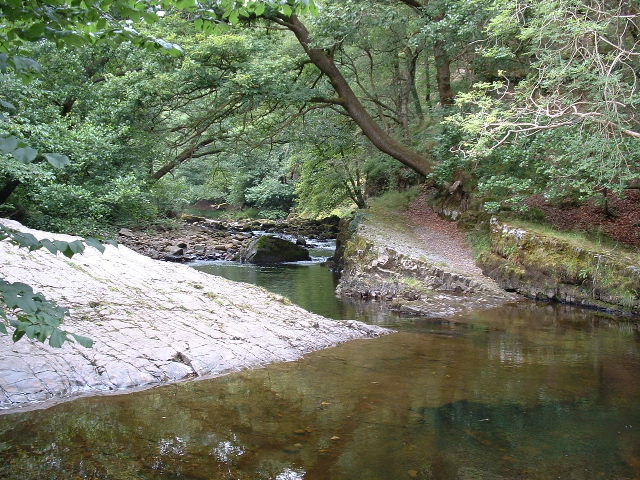

The Nedd Fechan is a river almost wholly within the county of Powys, Wales. It rises on the eastern slopes of Fan Gyhirych in the Fforest Fawr section of the Brecon Beacons National Park and flows south for 7 miles (11 km) to join with the Afon Mellte at Pontneddfechan, their combined waters continuing as the River Neath (Welsh Afon Nedd) to the sea near Swansea. The only significant tributary of the Nedd Fechan is the Afon Pyrddin which joins it at Pwll Du ar Byrddin ('the black pool of the Pyrddin'). Downstream of this confluence it forms the boundary between Powys to its east and Neath Port Talbot to its west.

== Geology ==
The headwaters of the river run over Old Red Sandstone as far as Blaen-nedd-isaf where they encounter the Carboniferous Limestone outcrop. The river then continues through a wooded gorge for the remainder of its course. The section downstream of Pont Rhyd-y-cnau is cut in sandstones and mudstones of the Millstone Grit series. The section between Pont Melin-fach and the confluence of the river with the Afon Pyrddin is perhaps the most dramatic as the river plunges over several falls of which Sgwd Ddwli and Sgwd Pedol are the most acclaimed. Each of the falls is associated with faults bringing harder sandstone beds into contact with the more readily eroded mudstones.

== Habitat protection ==
The entire gorge section of the Nedd Fechan valley is protected as part of a larger site of special scientific interest which also covers neighbouring river gorges. It also forms a part of a larger special area of conservation designated for its rare bryophyte flora.

== Archaeology ==
Downstream of the Pyrddin confluence is abundant evidence of the former silica rock mining industry. A number of adits are visible on both sides of the river, most of which were served by horse-drawn waggonways. The former waggonways now provide easy access along this lower section of the gorge.
