= Devil's Bridge, Ceredigion =

Village in Ceredigion, Wales

Coordinates: 52.3768°N 3.8500°W

Devil's Bridge: Welsh: Pontarfynach
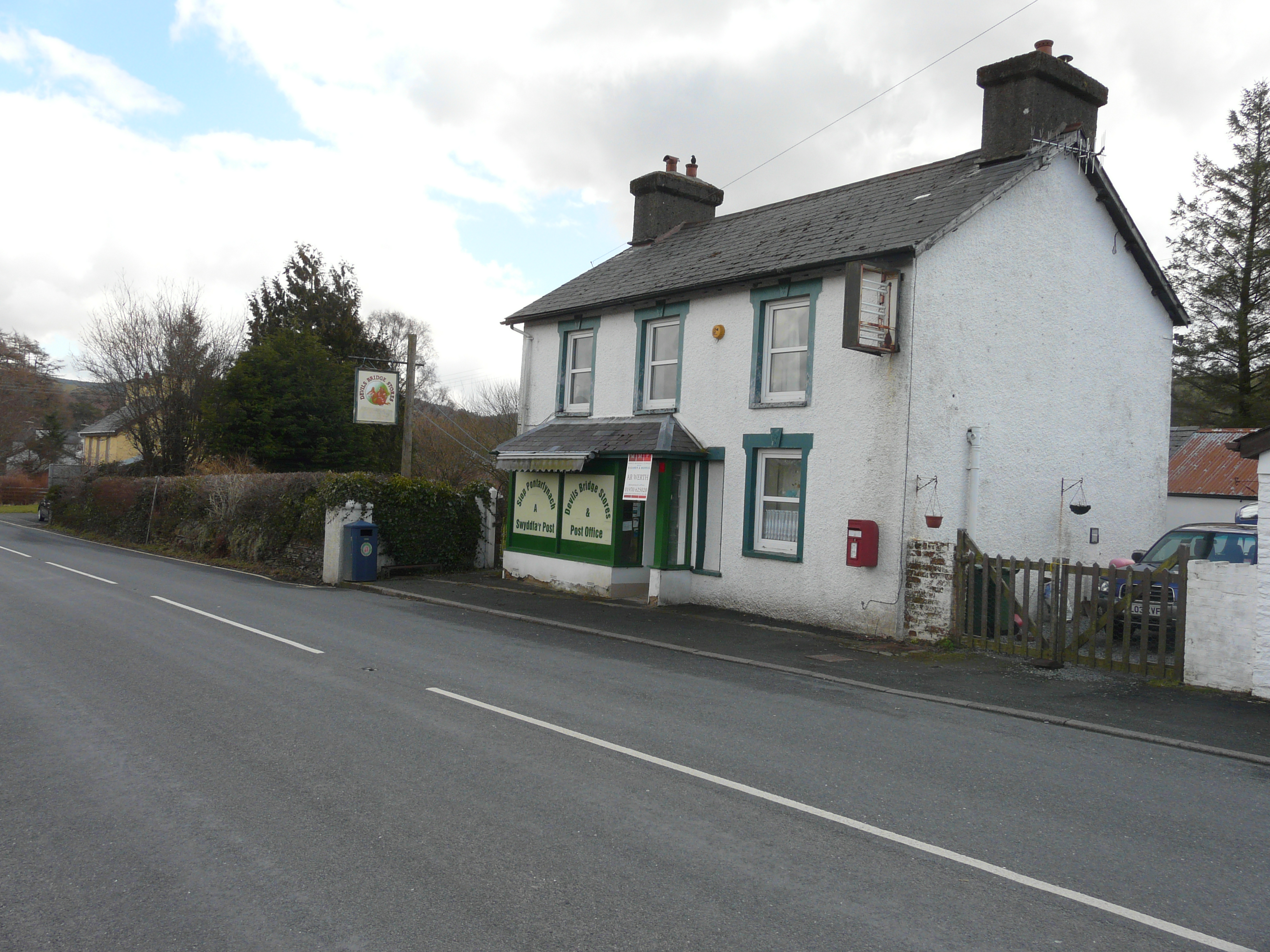

- Location within Ceredigion
- Population: 455 (2011 census)
- Community: Pontarfynach
- Principal area: Ceredigion
- Country: Wales
- Sovereign state: United Kingdom
- Police: Dyfed-Powys
- Fire: Mid and West Wales
- Ambulance: Welsh
- List of places UK Wales Ceredigion Community map: Map of the Pontarfynach community

Devil's Bridge, or Pontarfynach ('the bridge on the Mynach'), is a village and community (as Pontarfynach) in Ceredigion, Wales. To the edge of the village is the Devil's Bridge, a series of three stacked bridges on Afon Mynach, constructed hundreds of years apart.

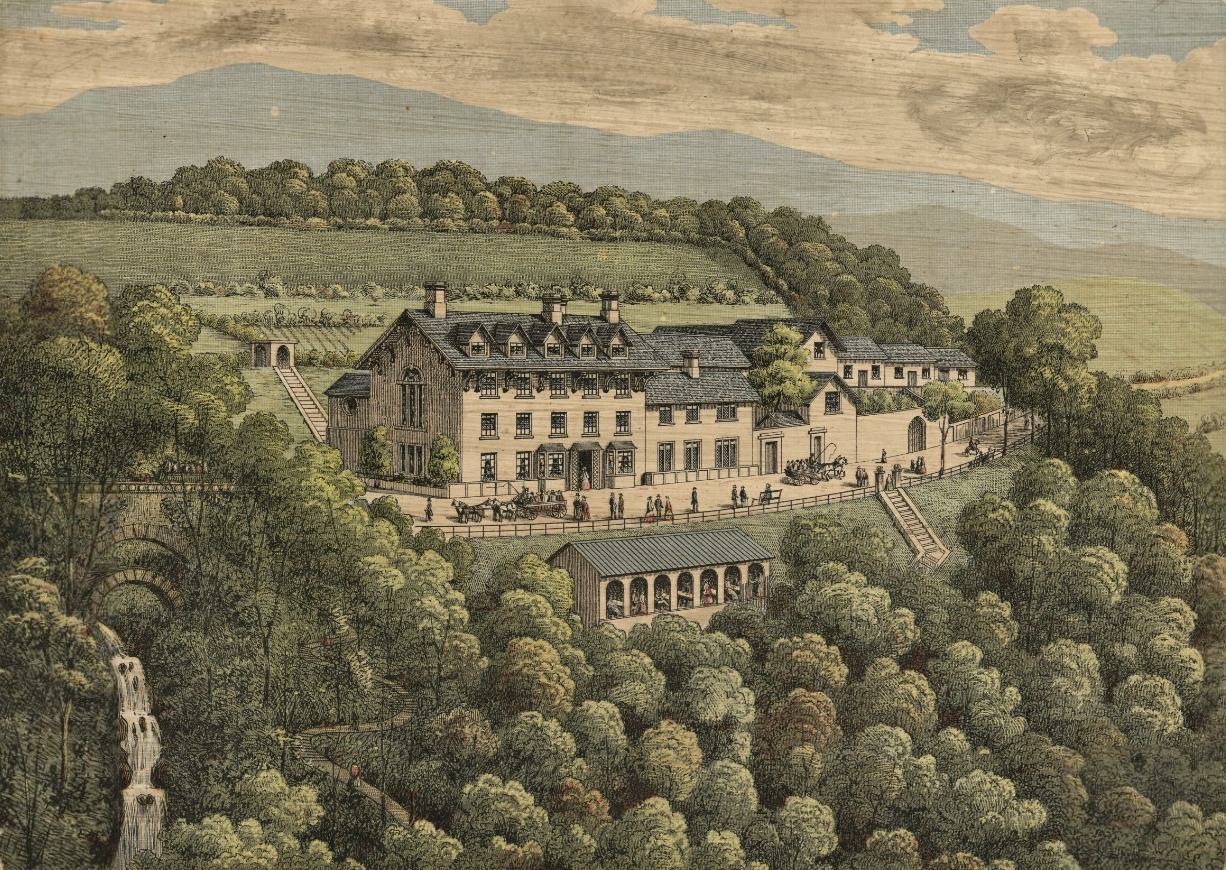
Devil's Bridge and the Hafod Arms Hotel before the construction of the third bridge, c. 1860

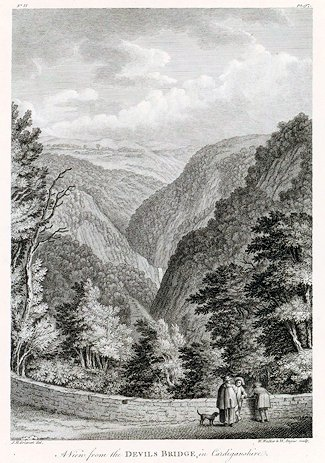
View from the Devil's Bridge, 1781

The village is on the A4120 road, about 10 miles (16 km) east of Aberystwyth.

The population of Pontarfynach community at the 2011 census was 455. The mid-2016 estimate suggests that the population had dropped slightly to 429.

== History ==
The name in 1629 was Pont ar Vynach or Pontarfynach, meaning 'bridge over the Mynach'. The word mynach is Welsh for 'monk'; one theory is that the river got its name from the fact that it was near land owned by a monastery. The first mention of the structure using the English name Devil's Bridge, in historical records, is from 1734.

The bridges that the village is named after were Grade II* listed on 21 January 1964, "as a remarkable succession of three superimposed bridges, one of the best known picturesque sites in Wales" and the listing was updated in 2005.

== Tourism and notable sites ==
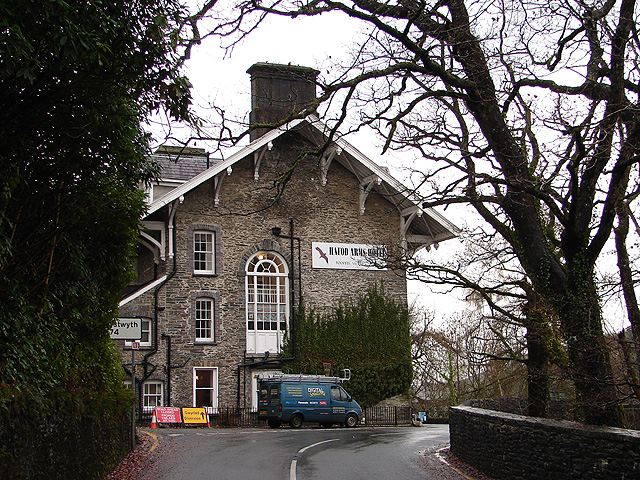
Hafod Arms Hotel, originally a smaller lodge built by Thomas Johnes

Devil's Bridge has been a tourist attraction for centuries. Records indicate that tourists were coming to this area by the mid-1700s and that an inn or hotel has existed nearby since before 1796.

The area was once part of the Hafod estate, owned by Thomas Johnes who built a small hunting lodge on the estate which was eventually expanded into an inn. The building burned down and was rebuilt. Significant renovations were completed in 1837–1839 and in the 1860s. After several expansions and upgrades, it has been operated as the Hafod Hotel, using this name since the 1860s. In 2017, new owners had arranged for a survey in preparation for a major renovation; they intended to maintain much of the historical character of the building. Some interior renovation work had been completed by September 2017.

The artist J. M. W. Turner sketched the bridge; this work is at the Tate Gallery, London. He also produced two watercolours of the area in 1795. In 1824, William Wordsworth published a poem, To the Torrent at the Devil’s Bridge, North Wales.

The celebrated English author George Borrow wrote Wild Wales (1854), which includes a lively, humorous account of his visit to Devil's Bridge. The George Borrow Hotel, a 17th-century inn where he reputedly stayed, is nearby; it is located between Devil's Bridge and Pontrhydygroeis Hafod Uchtryd.

Tourism to the area increased after the bridge and the Hafod building were featured in the Hinterland TV series, which has been broadcast in numerous countries. The hotel was presented, using flashbacks, as a children's home that had been closed down and turned into a guest house. Some tourists also enjoy the nearby nature trail, waterfalls and the historic steam railway. Other places of interest and attractions are located a short drive from the area, some in Aberystwyth.

Mary Lloyd Jones (born 1934), a Welsh painter and printmaker based in Aberystwyth was born in Devil's Bridge.

The address for the Devil's Bridge area is Woodlands (referring to the caravan park where free parking is available), Devil's Bridge, Ceredigion, Wales, SY23 3JW. The bridge is on the A4120, with sign posts providing guidance from the village centre.

== Transport ==
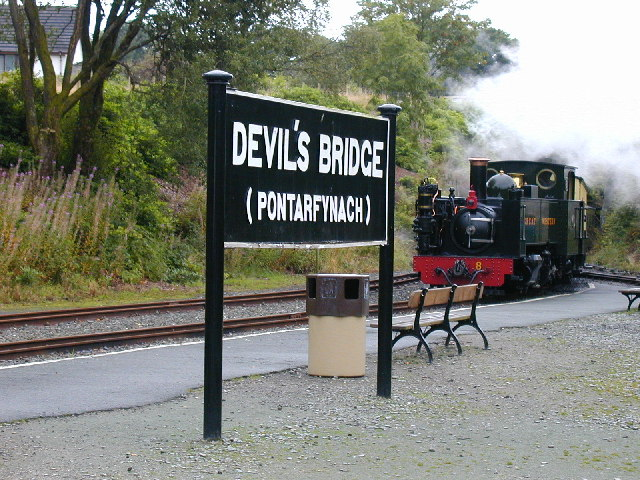
Devil's Bridge station

Devil's Bridge railway station is the upper terminus of the historic narrow-gauge Vale of Rheidol Railway, which opened between Aberystwyth and Devil's Bridge in 1902.

The village is served by one bus route, the 522, which runs between Tregaron and Aberystwyth; there is one service daily in each direction on weekdays and it is operated by Mid Wales Travel.

== Popular culture ==
Devil's Bridge and the hotel building are featured prominently in the opening two episodes of the first series of the 2013 Welsh-language crime noir, Y Gwyll (episodes titled in English "Devil's Bridge" and "Night Music"), shown on S4C and subsequently on BBC4 as Hinterland. Both are featured again in series 3 of the programme. The three series are streamed on Netflix in Canada and the US and also in Japan, Taiwan, India, South Africa, South America, Europe, Australia and New Zealand.

== See also ==
- Coed Rheidol National Nature Reserve
- Devil's Bridge for other bridges of the same name
