= River Mellte =

River in south Wales

Coordinates: 51°45′N 3°35′W

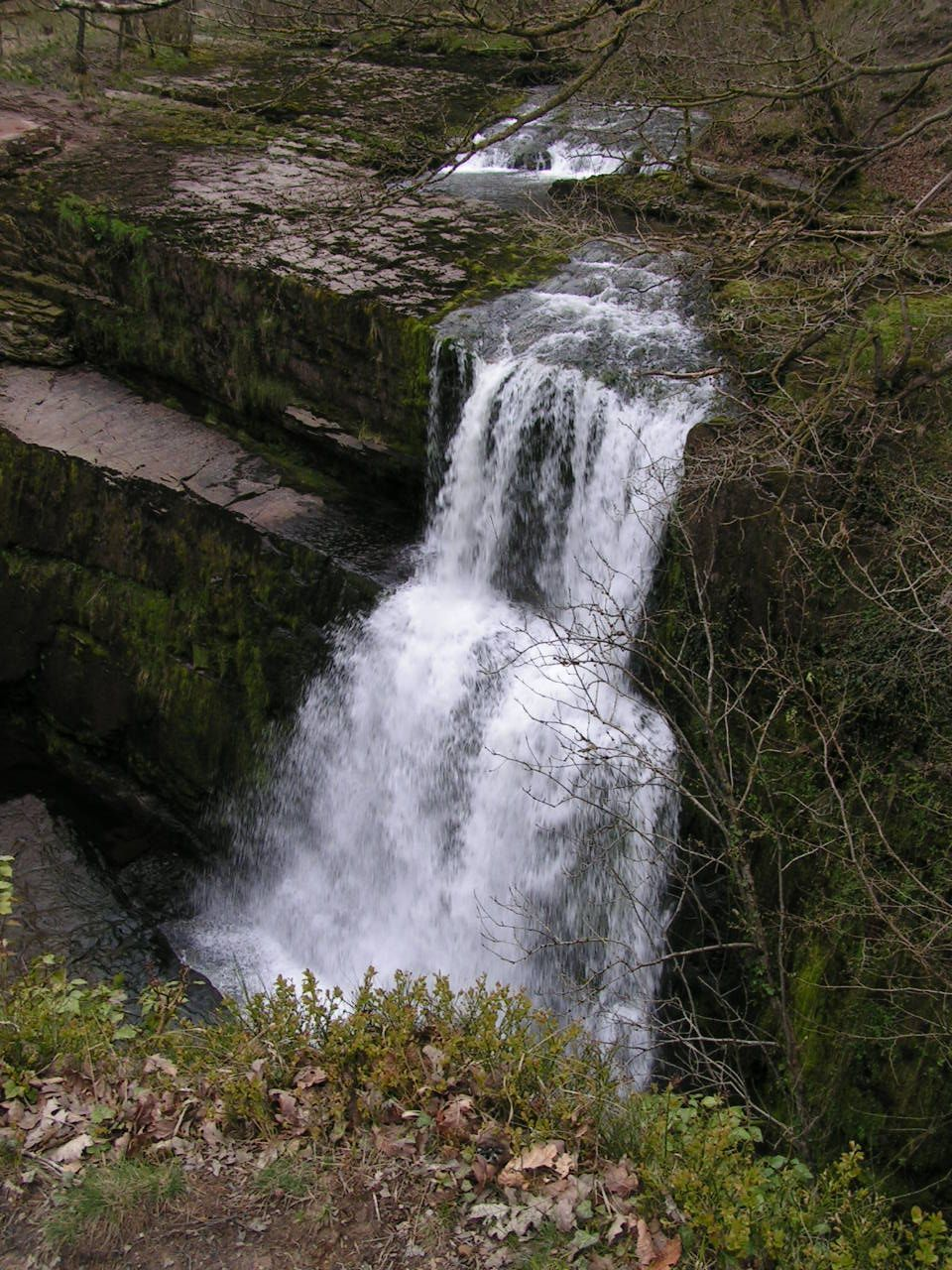
Sgwd Clun-gwyn, Afon Mellte

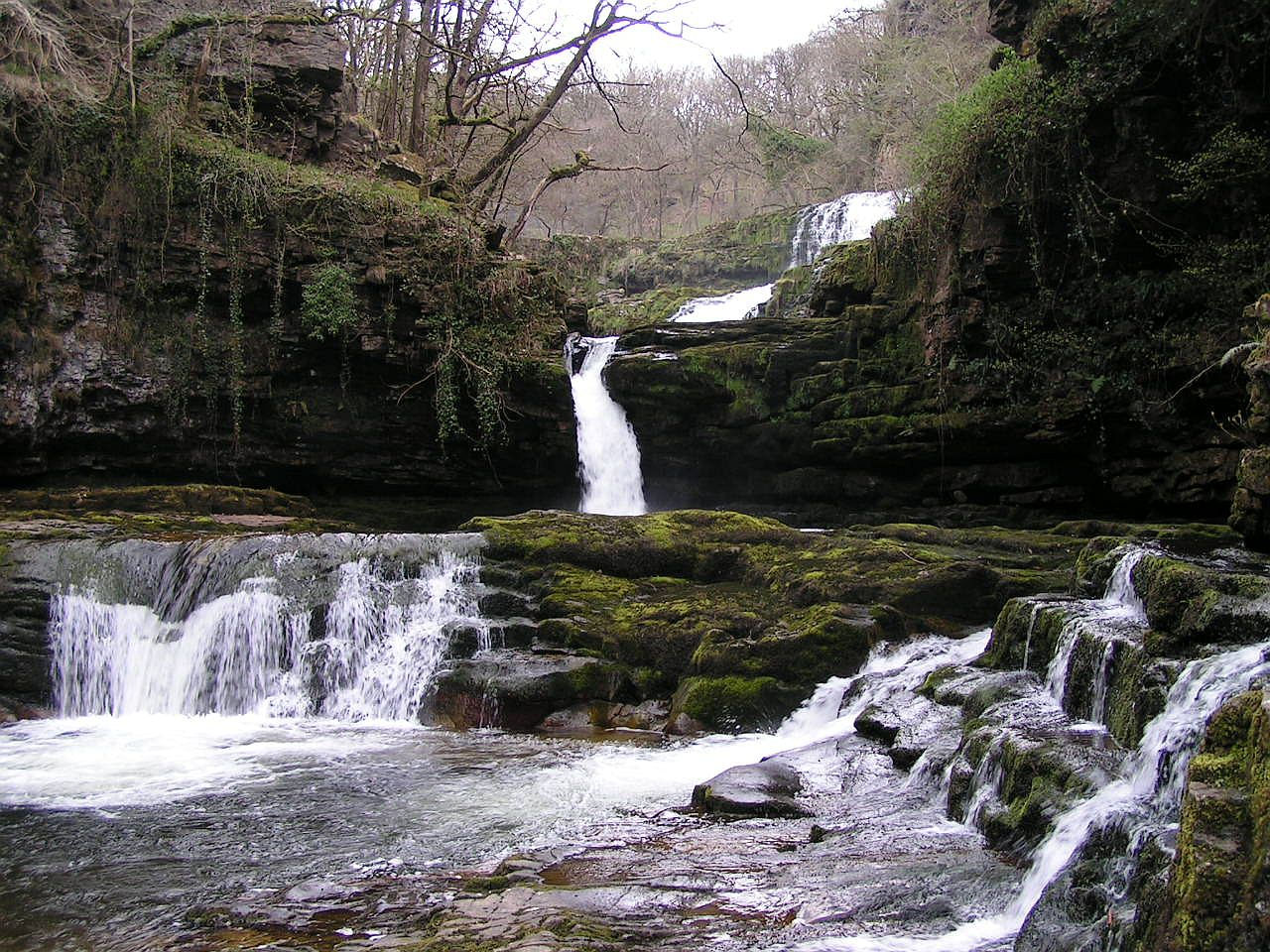
Sgwd Isaf Clun-gwyn, Afon Mellte

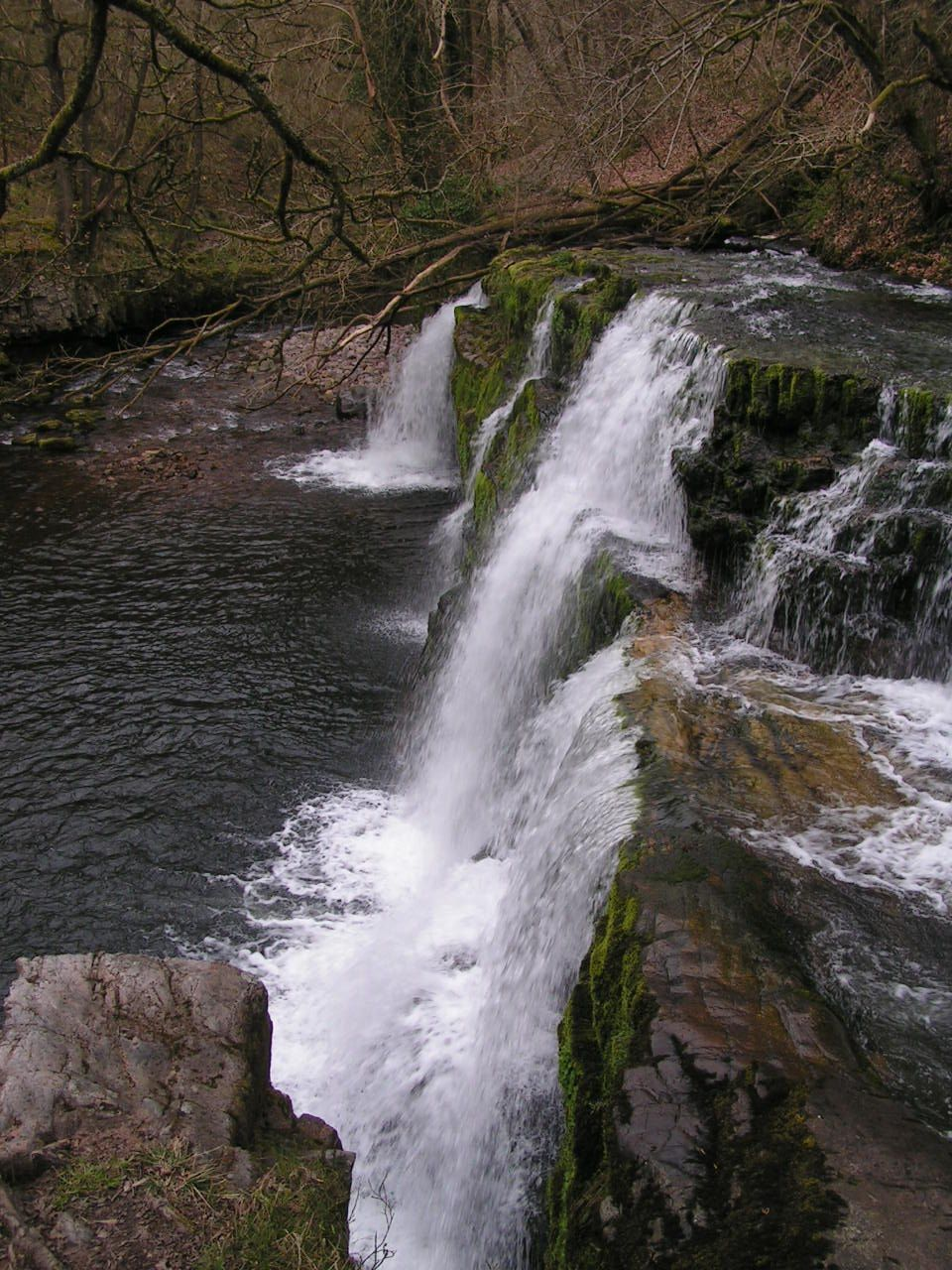
Sgwd y Pannwr, Afon Mellte

The River Mellte (Welsh: Afon Mellte; Welsh pronunciation: [ˈmɛɬtɛ]) is a river in south Wales. It is formed by the confluence of the Afon Llia and the Afon Dringarth. It then flows south through the village of Ystradfellte to Pontneddfechan where it joins with the Nedd Fechan to become the River Neath (Welsh: 'Afon Nedd'). The river derives its name from 'mellt' - the Welsh word for 'lightning' - after its tendency to rise and fall rapidly in response to heavy rainfall.

== Underground section ==
The entire river runs underground for 1/2 km at Porth yr Ogof as it crosses the Carboniferous Limestone outcrop. It resurges at Pwll Glas. There are fifteen known entrances to the cave system. It is a complex maze of passageways, large and small, mostly developed along one or two major bedding planes. In extreme flood conditions the entire cave can flood to the roof. It is used heavily by school and adventure groups though sections of the cave can be hazardous for the unwary. There have been a number of fatalities over the years.

== Waterfalls ==
Downstream of Porth-yr-Ogof and within 'Waterfall Country', the river flows over several falls, the most significant of which are Sgwd Clun-gwyn, Sgwd Isaf Clun-gwyn and Sgwd y Pannwr - meaning 'white meadow fall', 'lower white meadow fall' and 'fall of the woollen washer (or fuller)'.

== Habitat protection ==
The larger part of the river and its valley is protected both as a site of special scientific interest (Dyffrynoedd Nedd a Mellte a Moel Penderyn SSSI) and as a special area of conservation (Coedydd Nedd a Mellte SAC) in respect of the bryophyte flora which the deep and wooded nature of the valleys help to support.

== Industrial archaeology ==
The river provided the source of the power for the former gunpowder works at Pontneddfechan. The site is strung out along 3 km of the valley on both sides of the river. The remains of two weirs from which leats took water to drive a series of waterwheels and turbines can still be seen. All production on the site ceased in 1931.

== Access ==
Much of the river is accessible to walkers with both public footpaths and concessionary paths running beside the river and giving access to the various falls. Brecon Beacons National Park Authority has worked in conjunction with the Forestry Commission and the Countryside Council for Wales, and subsequently with their successor body Natural Resources Wales, to ensure that the path erosion that has resulted from the popularity of this area is halted and reversed. A concessionary path runs through the gunpowder works site.

Visitors can park at the pay and display car parks at Cwm Porth and the nearby Gwaun Hepste or else in Pontneddfechan.

== Outdoor activities ==
The river and surrounding area is a hot spot for many different outdoor activities including the famous waterfall walks, caving, canyoning, gorge walking and white water kayaking. Providing a fun day out with any activity you choose to do, each with their own dangers there are many companies that operate in the valley running fun days out for all. This is a classic white water kayaking river with paddlers that have kayaked all over the world still regarding it as one of their favourites on the grade 4/5 white water.

== See also ==
- List of waterfalls
- List of waterfalls in Wales
