= Pontneddfechan =

Village in Brecknockshire, Wales

Coordinates: 51.7554°N 3.5878°W

- Location within Powys
- Population: 340
- OS grid reference: SN905075
- Community: Ystradfellte
- Principal area: Powys
- Preserved county: West Glamorgan
- Country: Wales
- Sovereign state: United Kingdom
- Post town: NEATH
- Postcode district: SA11
- Dialling code: 01639
- Police: Dyfed-Powys
- Fire: Mid and West Wales
- Ambulance: Welsh
- UK Parliament: Brecon, Radnor and Cwm Tawe
- Senedd Cymru – Welsh Parliament: Brecon and Radnorshire

Pontneddfechan (Welsh for 'bridge over the Little Neath'

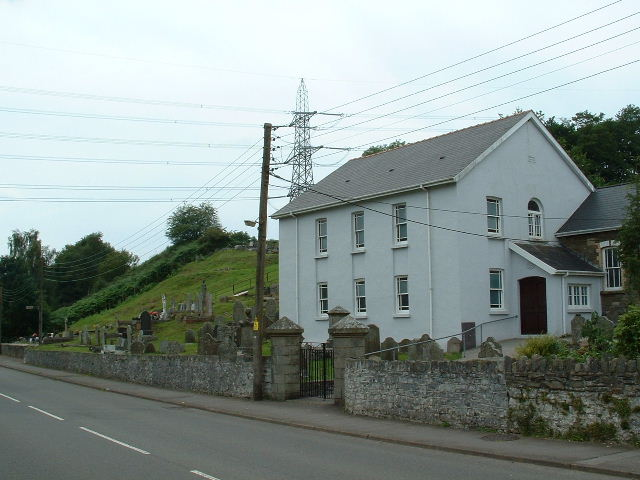
Ebeneezer Chapel. On East of square at western outskirts of Pontneddfechan.

pronounced [pɔntˌniðˈvɔːn]; also known as Pontneathvaughan) is a village in Powys, Wales. It is the southernmost village in the historic county of Brecknockshire, within the Vale of Neath and in the community of Ystradfellte. It stands at the confluence of the rivers Mellte and Nedd Fechan ("Neath Vaughan") and gives access to a series of waterfalls that adorn the upper Neath valley. Dinas Rock is a quarried limestone promontory east of the village, popular with visitors.

== History ==
District industrial activities started with a 21-year lease of an area from the Marquess of Bute by the Quaker entrepreneur William Weston Young, for mining silica rock round Craig-y-Ddinas from 1822 onwards. The silica was extracted for firebricks at the Dinas Firebrick Co. in Pont Walby. In 1843, Young's lease ran out and the then Riddles, Young & Co. firebrick makers moved to new premises on The Green, Neath. The stone sleepers for the silica mine tramway can still be seen in the path of the waterfall walk.

In 1857, the Vale of Neath Powder Co. built a "gunpowder manufactory", having obtained "a licence to erect their mills over a space of two miles including the Upper and Lower Cilliepste Falls". The site on the Mellte was chosen for remoteness and the availability of water power and timber for producing charcoal, an ingredient of gunpowder. An inclined tramway wfrom a siding on the Vale of Neath Railway near Pen-cae-drain, brought in sulphur and saltpetre, the other ingredients. The buildings were linked by a horse-drawn tramway, whose horses wore copper horseshoes to reduce the likelihood of sparks. In 1862, Curtis's & Harvey took over the site, later merging with Nobel's Explosives Co. and being absorbed by Imperial Chemical Industries in 1926. It then closed in 1931, but the site is still known locally as the Gunpowder Works. It is administered by the National Park Authority and has a network of footpaths.

The Welsh-language poet Evan Bevan died at Pontneddfechan in 1866.

== See also ==
- Dyffrynnoedd Nedd a Mellte, a Moel Penderyn

== Map sources ==
- Map sources for Pontneddfechan
