= Brecon Forest Tramroad =

Former tramroad network in Powys, Wales

The Brecon Forest Tramroad is an early nineteenth century tramroad, or rather a network of connecting tramroads or waggonways, which stretched across the hills of Fforest Fawr in the historic county of Brecknockshire (modern administrative county of Powys) in south Wales, UK. Its northern terminus was at the village of Sennybridge in the Usk Valley whilst its southern ends lay at Abercraf and Ystradgynlais in the upper Swansea Valley some 20 km (12 miles) to the south.

The tramroad project was conceived by John Christie, a Scottish-born entrepreneur based in London who had amassed a fortune from his involvement in the indigo trade with India. This enabled him to purchase the Crown Allotment of the Great Forest of Brecon (or Fforest Fawr) on its sale by the Crown in 1819. Construction of the tramroad was an essential part of his plans for the exploitation of his property. His original intention was to use the tramroad to convey limestone sourced from quarries near Penwyllt to the farms of the Usk valley and Mynydd Epynt where its soil-improving qualities would be appreciated.

He subsequently expanded his activities to exploit minerals outside Fforest Fawr and to markets further to the south in the rapidly industrialising valleys of the South Wales Coalfield.

== History of development ==
Christie commenced construction of the tramroad in about 1821. The earliest section constructed was that between the limestone quarries at Pwll Byfre and Castell-du Farm at Sennybridge. The model farm of Cnewr was constructed at the halfway point of this stretch of tramroad.

A second stage was to build a tramroad to serve the Drim Colliery near Onllwyn which Christie had leased in 1822. From the colliery the line ran northeastwards to the village of Coelbren and then across the Nant Llech just above Henrhyd Falls and around the flanks of the hill north to Penwyllt. Initially Christie's probable intention was to link this line to that at Pwll Byfre by an incline through what is now the Ogof Ffynnon Ddu National Nature Reserve.

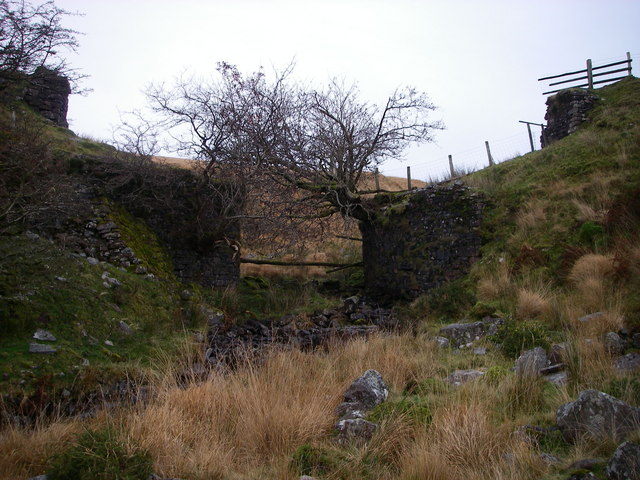
Ruined crossing of Nant Gyhirych

This scheme was abandoned and instead the line from the Drim was taken northwards along the contours of the eastern side of the valley past the quarries at Penwyllt, wrapping around the western slopes of Fan Gyhirych and over the pass at Bwlch Bryn-rhudd then northeastwards to join the original line just south of the Nant Gyhirych stream.

Christie further extended the tramroad southwestwards from its southern terminus to a colliery at Gwaun Clawdd on the northern slopes of Mynydd y Drum and connected it to the Swansea Canal at Cae'r Lan near Abercraf. During the 1820s he was a major shipper of coal on the canal which was shipped through Swansea.

Christie was declared bankrupt in December 1827 and the Great Forest, including the tramroad and most of his other assets, passed to his principal creditor, Joseph Claypon, of the banking house of Garfit & Claypon in Boston, Lincolnshire. Claypon built a further extension southwest and then west from the Drim colliery to join the Swansea Canal and to supply limestone to the Ynyscedwyn Ironworks at Ystradgynlais.

Following the death of Claypon in 1859 much of Christie's original route was ultimately sold to the railway contractor, John Dickson and incorporated by him into the Neath and Brecon Railway. Claypon's Tramroad was largely unaffected by this, although sections at Ystradgynlais were converted into colliery railways or taken over by the Swansea Vale Railway.

== Main present-day route ==
Much of the southernmost section of the Tramroad was followed by the later Neath and Brecon Railway and this route obliterates long sections of the tramway. From Penwyllt, the main route north is again followed by the railway line though the occasional tighter bend is preserved where the later railway had to assume a more flowing curve.

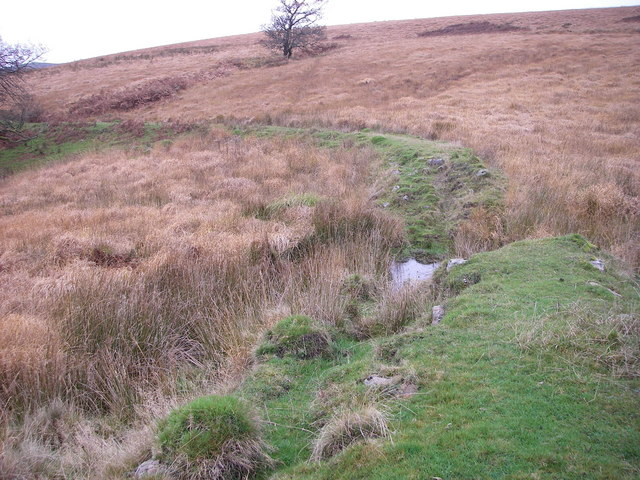
Abandoned loop near Coelbren.

The modern A4067 road follows the line of the tramway north from Bwlch Bryn-rhudd before the grassed-over route is seen to sweep around to the east to cross the Nant Gyhirych at the edge of a plantation. It continues northwestwards to near the junction of the minor road to Heol Senni with the A4067 before crossing the latter and curving westwards and northwards towards Crai. From this point onwards to its northern terminus the tramway route largely coincides with the later railway though in places it runs roughly parallel to it.

Claypon's Tramroad can be followed for much of its length. At the Onllwyn end it has been obliterated by opencasting and subsequent land restoration but lengthy sections can be followed around Mynydd y Drum, including sections where runs of stone blocks still remain. The mile-long incline down into Ystradgynlais can be followed including the ruined remains of the winding engine house at the summit.

== Cribarth Tramroads ==
Some of the many miles of tramroad on the hill known as Cribarth on the western side of the upper Swansea Valley are also deemed to form a part of the Brecon Forest Tramroad network, constructed as they were by Christie and his successors. These served numerous limestone quarries as well as sources of silica sand though it seems that the connection to extensive rottenstone workings to the north of Cribarth was not completed and did not come fully into operation.

== Public access ==
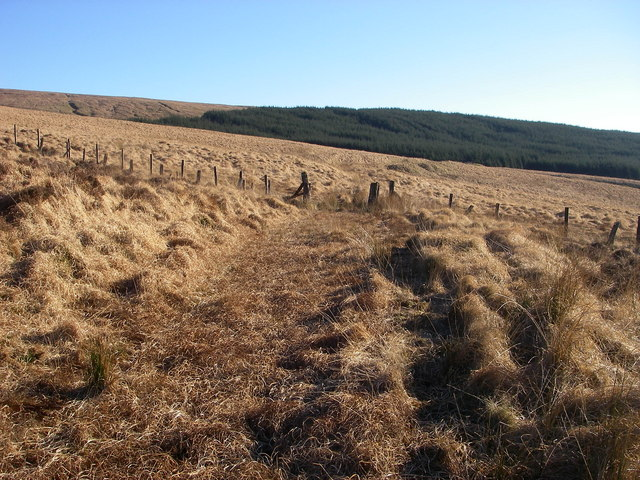
Section of former tramroad crossing open country south of Crai.

Parts of the route are followed by public footpaths whilst some other sections are available to walkers as permitted paths. Long sections run through open country designated as access land and which are therefore legally available to walkers, though the terrain is somewhat difficult and often waterlogged. Much of the northern few miles of the route is not publicly accessible though it is crossed by a few minor roads and public paths from which short sections of the route can be glimpsed.

== Gallery ==
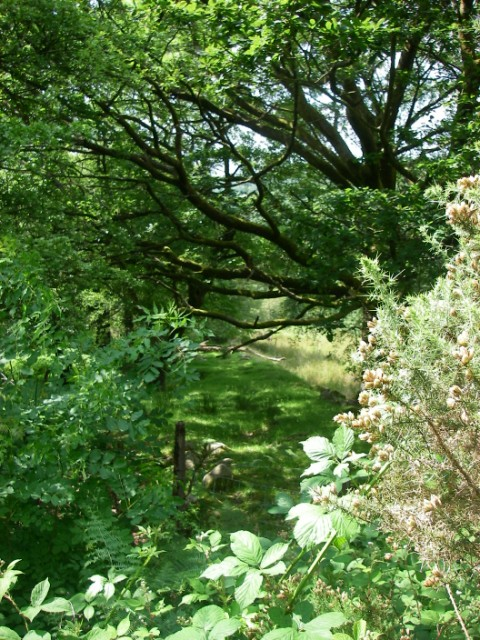

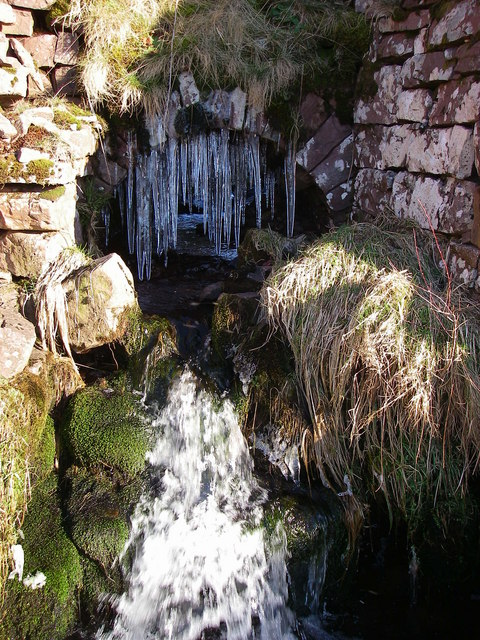

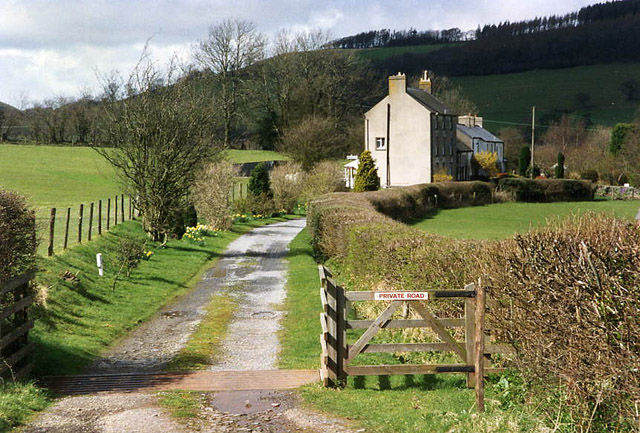
