= John Dickson (railway contractor) =

British railway-construction company owner and businessman

John Dickson (c1819-13 June 1892), was a railway contractor responsible for the promotion, construction and operation of several railway lines in England and Wales, especially in and around Swansea. His finances were never securely based and he was forced into bankruptcy on three occasions.

== Early days (to 1857) ==
Dickson was born in Berwick-on-Tweed in about 1819. He first appears in the historical record in Ireland in 1840 when he married Elizabeth McMurray of Drogheda. His first daughter Catherine was born the following year at Killyman in County Tyrone. He remained in Ireland until 1847, and judging by the places of birth of subsequent children he was on the move all the time – Helen was born in County Sligo (1842), James in Dublin (1844) and Anna in Drogheda (1845). He appears to have been involved in some capacity under William Dargan on the construction of the Dublin and Drogheda Railway (1841-4) and the Great Southern and Western Railway (1845-7). There is also a possibility that he worked under Dargan on the Ulster Canal.

In 1847 Dickson left Ireland and returned to England, settling at Wellington, Shropshire, for reasons that are still not entirely clear, but where he quite quickly established himself as a person of some influence, especially in the still relatively new field of railway engineering. In 1852 he went into partnership with one McKensie (or McKenzie) and founded the Shropshire works on a site adjacent to the Shrewsbury and Birmingham Railway, between Wellington and Oakengates. According to a contemporary newspaper report, the Shropshire Works occupied a site of eight acres and possessed "appliances for making and constructing almost every article connected with a railway, from the simple block of wood that secure the rail to the sleepers, to the carriages which roll over them." Dickson and McKensie were said to have sunk £30,000 in the venture and some time before the publication of the report had completed 170 wagons for the Newport & Abergavenny Railway Company, "in a short space of two months," and were engaged on the production of "a large number of passenger carriages" for the Great Western Railway company.

Early in his time at Wellington, Dickson made the acquaintance of Alfred Darby (I), a member of the celebrated Shropshire iron-founding dynasty and the then manager of the family's Coalbrookdale Works.

It seems likely that one reason Dickson chose to settle at Wellington is that he had successfully tendered for a portion of the Shrewsbury and Birmingham Railway line between Shrewsbury, Wellington and Oakengates, which was constructed during the years 1847-9. Two years after the opening of the S & BR, in February 1851, Dickson constructed, apparently at his own expense, a branch line from Waterloo sidings, east of Wellington, to the Ketley Ironworks and entered into an agreement with the latter to work all traffic, whether by rail or road, from the works to the S & BR.

Dickson and McKensie worked on two further local railway contracts, the Madeley branch of the Shrewsbury and Birmingham Railway (completed in 1854) and the Ketley-Horsehay section of the Wellington and Severn Junction Railway (1855-7). The latter contract undoubtedly owed much to Dickson's association with Darby and the Coalbrookdale Company, who were expected to subscribe to the line, and indeed the alignment made use of, and superseded, his earlier private railway to the Ketley Ironworks for a short distance. Dickson had in fact surveyed the entire line from Ketley to Lightmoor, and given evidence before the House of Lords committee that examined the Bill, but was only awarded the contract for the northern portion of the undertaking, work on which was begun with much pomp and ceremony in August 1855. In October 1855 it was reported that the works were in active progress and that the cost of building the line would be about £4,000 to £5,000 per mile, but at a shareholders' meeting in March 1860 the Chairman revealed that the actual cost had been much nearer £13,000 per mile. Dickson had tendered less than £10,000 for the entire contract, from which it appears that he had woefully underestimated the cost. Unsurprisingly, in January 1857 he was made a bankrupt for the first time. Ironically, work on the Ketley-Horsehay line was in a sufficiently advanced state for a trial run to be made by shareholders in February 1857, and for it to be opened for goods and mineral traffic on 1 May of the same year.

In addition to these works on his own doorstep, Dickson tendered unsuccessfully in 1855 for the Llanidloes and Newtown Railway. Under the aegis of the Shropshire Works, he also operated a rolling stock business at this period and is known to have tendered for the supply of ballast wagons and wheels to the South Wales Railway in 1855 and to have supplied carriages to the Llanelly Railway in 1856 and also wagons and brake vans to the Belfast and County Down Railway at much the same time.

In 1854 Dickson, in partnership with J.G. McKenzie, won his first contract in south Wales, an area that was to become his home for most of the rest of his life. This was for the Gyfylchi Tunnel on the South Wales Mineral Railway. The financial position of the railway company prevented an immediate start being made until 1856 when he was additionally offered a contract to construct the entire line. He started work in April 1856 but made little progress and in September 1856 Isambard Kingdom Brunel, the engineer of the SWMR, was instructed to pay off Dickson and re-let the contract.

In July 1855 Dickson won a contract from the Swansea Harbour Trust for various work connected with the town's North Dock. This was followed by a number of further contracts in 1855-6 for related work. Most of the work was still uncompleted when he was declared bankrupt on 20 January 1857. He was described as 'Builder, Stone and Timber merchant, Brickmaker and Contractor for Public Works'.

== Activities around Swansea and Neath (1857-1867) ==
The period between Dickson's first and second bankruptcies was the most active and successful of his career with the construction of two railways (albeit of modest length) and the promotion of many other schemes which failed to materialise because his vision outstripped his resources. The methods which were adopted by Dickson and his backers in the financing of both these railways were typical of those employed on other 'contractors' lines', a phenomenon that was particularly prevalent at this period.

Dickson was discharged on 3 June 1857 and settled near Neath, presumably hoping to build on the contacts he had made in the area since 1853. During the years 1859-61 he claimed to have been involved in some way with the promotion of the Swansea and Neath Railway (the extension into Swansea of the Vale of Neath Railway), although it is not possible to establish the exact role that he played in this.

In 1861, having assembled a group of financial backers, Dickson promoted the Dulais Valley Mineral Railway, a scheme to build a short line from the Vale of Neath Railway at Neath up the Dulais Valley to Banwen with a view to opening up the coal reserves of the valley. It was authorised in 1862. The following year Parliament approved the extension of the railway to Brecon and the change of its name to the Neath and Brecon Railway. Where it crossed the Great Forest of Brecon the route of the extension followed the now disused Brecon Forest Tramroad which Dickson purchased in 1863. He saw the railway as potentially forming part of a link from the Midlands and north of England to south Wales and he probably had hopes of selling it on completion to one of the major English companies. Also in 1863, in partnership with one Russell, Dickson won a contract to construct the Anglesey Central Railway. As was typical of contractors' lines at this period, Dickson & Russell were willing to accept payment in shares.

The construction and operation of these two lines were to occupy him until his second bankruptcy in 1867 but at the same time as he was working on their construction he was also preparing plans and for far-reaching extensions to the Neath and Brecon Railway. These included extensions from Sennybridge to the Central Wales Line at Llangammarch Wells and a short line to connect the N&BR to the Swansea Vale Railway near Ystalyfera which was later to be constructed (although not by Dickson) as the Swansea Vale and Neath and Brecon Junction Railway. Both of these projects were authorised by Parliament in 1864, but a grandiose plan to extend the N&BR into Swansea and build a central station in the town was rejected in the same session.

In 1863 Dickson started to build St Andrew's Presbyterian church in Swansea for the benefit of the Scottish community in the town. It was completed in 1864 and opened on 12 August.

A renewed attempt to extend the N&BR to Swansea was made in 1864, this time by purchasing the Swansea Canal and building the railway on its banks, but this too failed. Also in 1864 Dickson and others formulated plans to purchase the Oystermouth Railway at Swansea and build a main-line railway alongside it to a deep-water harbour at Mumbles. In pursuit of this goal he acquired the foreshore rights all round Swansea Bay from the Duke of Beaufort in June 1864 and in October reached an agreement with George Byng Morris, the mortgagee in possession, to purchase the Oystermouth Railway. However, his Mumbles Railway & Pier Bill of 1865 failed to win the approval of Parliament.

Further schemes with which Dickson was connected at this period were the Afon Valley Railway of 1865 running up the Afan valley from Port Talbot and the Aberdare & Central Wales Railway of 1866 which was intended to link the N&BR to the Taff Vale Railway at Aberdare and so make the N&BR part of a through route from the north of England to Cardiff as well as to Swansea. Both schemes were successful in obtaining Acts of Parliament but no work was carried out on either. Further attempts to obtain authorisation for a railway to Mumbles and a deep-water harbour and for a central station in Swansea were once again unsuccessful.

The Anglesey Central Railway was opened in stages between 1864 and 1867. The Neath and Brecon Railway was completed in 1866 and the formal opening took place on 13 September 1866 although regular passenger traffic did not commence until 3 June 1867. Dickson worked the traffic on both lines. A feature of particular interest was his use of the first Fairlie locomotives, Progress and Mountaineer, on the N&BR and of Mountaineer on the ACR. He also made a start on the construction of the line from Sennybridge to Llangammarch Wells but this section was only partly finished when he was made bankrupt for a second time on 9 September 1867 and was never completed. His finances had become overstretched and he was a belated victim of the collapse of the bank of Overend and Gurney in May 1866 which had resulted in the failure of a number of other railway contractors.

== Activities in the north of England (1867-1874) ==
Dickson was discharged on 16 March 1868 following which he moved to Liverpool. The reason for this is not clear.

In 1866 Parliament authorised the Whitby Redcar and Middlesbrough Union Railway. No attempt was made to start construction until 1871 when a contract was let to Dickson. He started work in May 1871 but his lack of progress gave rise to concern and in December 1873 he was dismissed from the contract. A report then made by T.E. Harrison, the Engineer of the North Eastern Railway details bridges and viaducts that were badly designed and badly built, inaccurate surveying, poor workmanship, and bad design in general. One three-mile section had been built along the side of the cliffs and had already started to fall into the sea. The viaducts were built to Dickson's own design with tubular wrought-iron piers filled with concrete.

At the same time Dickson was also working on a contract from the Mersey Railway. This company had been incorporated in 1871 with powers to build a railway under the river between Liverpool and Birkenhead. Dickson was awarded a contract to sink shafts to the depth at which the boring of the actual tunnel could be undertaken by the Diamond Boring Machine Co. He started work in April 1872 by sinking a shaft on the Birkenhead side and by March 1873 this shaft had been sunk to full tunnel depth. In November 1873 the Mersey Docks and Harbour Board accepted a tender from Dickson for the enlargement and alteration of the Canada basin and other related works but it is doubtful if any significant progress was made.

It is clear that Dickson was attempting to undertake contracts that were out of proportion to the financial resources that he could command. He was under-capitalised and suffered from cash-flow problems. Not surprisingly, he was declared bankrupt for a third time on 3 December 1874.

== Return to Swansea (1874-1892) ==
By 1877 Dickson had returned to Swansea where he lived on the outskirts of Oystermouth. In that year the newly formed Swansea Improvements and Tramway Company reached an agreement with George Byng Morris, still mortgagee in possession, to take over the working of the Oystermouth Railway with a view to integrating it with the street tramways that they were constructing. Dickson (through his trustee in bankruptcy) challenged this in the courts, since he still claimed the right to complete the agreement he had made with Morris in 1865. The courts upheld his claim and the railway was put up for sale that autumn. It was bought by Dickson's associates on his behalf

Dickson, by now discharged from bankruptcy, started to run a steam-hauled service along the line in 1878 and in 1879 formed the Swansea and Mumbles Railway to buy the Oystermouth Railway from him. However, under the terms of their agreement with Morris, the SITC also had the right to operate over the line and for the next ten or more years there was fierce and often acrimonious competition.

Dickson's involvement with the Swansea and Mumbles Railway ceased in 1885 when Sir John Jones Jenkins took a lease of the railway. He suffered what appears to have been a stroke in about 1890 and died on 13 June 1892. He was buried in his family vault in the churchyard at Wellington.

== Sources ==
The activities and plans of Dickson, especially in the Swansea district in the 1860s and 1880s, are frequently reported in the Swansea newspaper, The Cambrian. Biographical summaries can also be found in the same newspaper, 4 June 1880 (letter by Dickson); 11 June 1880 (letter by 'One who knows the facts'); 14 May 1886 (statement supplied to the press by Dickson); 17 June 1892 (obituary)
