= A4109 road =

Road in south Wales

Coordinates: 51.74688°N 3.73801°W

A4109

Major junctions
- Southwest end: Aberdulais
- A465 A4230 A4221 A465
- Northeast end: Glynneath

Location
- Country: United Kingdom
- Constituent country: Wales

Road network
- Roads in the United Kingdom; Motorways; A and B road zones

The A4109 road, known as the Inter Valley Road, links Aberdulais with Glynneath in Neath Port Talbot county borough, Wales.

The route begins in Aberdulais at the junction with the A4230 and A465 roads; it diverges northwards away from the A465 up the Dulais Valley and crosses through the settlements of Crynant, Ynysfforch, Seven Sisters, Onllwyn, Dyffryn Cellwen and Banwen where it has a junction with the A4221. The road then continues in a southeasterly direction along the Inter Valley Road to Glynneath where it again connects with the A465.

== Accidents ==
Welsh rugby international Elli Norkett was killed in an accident on this road in 2017.
