= Cefn Coed Colliery Museum =

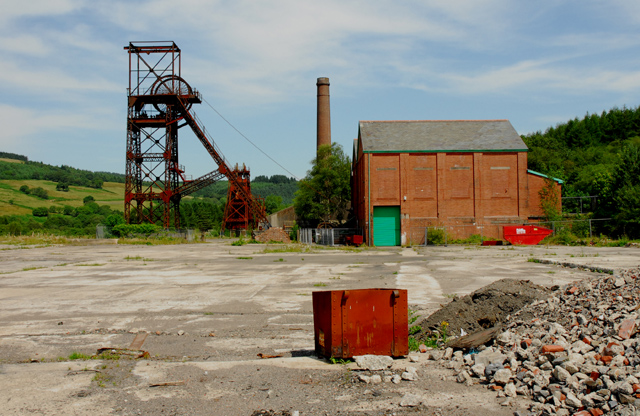
- Cefn Coed Colliery

- Location within Neath Port Talbot
- Location: Crynant, Neath Port Talbot, Wales
- Coordinates: 51.714493°N 3.759142°W
- Type: Mining museum
- Owner: Neath Port Talbot County Borough Council
- Website: Cefn Coed Colliery Museum

Cefn Coed Colliery Museum is a former coal mine, now operating as a museum. It is located at Crynant near Neath in the South Wales Valleys.

== Background ==
Coal mining in the Neath area began with the development of the port of Neath in the 16th century. In 1743 Herbert Mackworth began mining at Onllwyn, with production rising with the opening of the Neath and Brecon Railway in 1864. David Bevan opened a pit at Blaendulais in 1872, naming it the Seven Sisters after his seven daughters. The Evans-Bevan family then began exploiting the Swansea Valley from the 1870s, and by nationalisation in 1947 owned seven collieries within seven miles of each other.

== History ==
Cefn Coed Colliery was opened as an anthracite colliery by the Llwynonn Colliery Company during the 1920s. Three attempts were unsuccessfully made to sink shafts at Cefn Coed, but it was not until the Llwynonn Colliery company was bought out by the Amalgamated Anthracite Combine of Ammanford in 1926 and high capital investment made, that a break was made in the hard Blue Pennant sandstone. The first coal raised in 1930, with the shaft and workings powered by a steam engine, fueled by the gas from the old workings.

Like much of western South Wales coalfield, the coal was high quality anthracite. The best coal came from the deepest seam called Big Vein, broken into at a depth of 750 yards. Cefn Coed during its working life at depths of over 2,500 feet (800m), was the deepest anthracite mine in the world. Other seams worked at Cefn Coed included: Peacock, White Four Feet and the Nine Feet. Brammallite was identified in the Dulais seam, by X-ray diffraction by the Natural History Museum, London; making Cefn Coed one of only two sites in all of Wales for Brammallite. However, at such depths and with frequent mining accidents due to methane gas and roof falls, the pit and it soon gained the unenviable nickname of "The Slaughterhouse."

By the end of World War II in 1945 there were 908 men employed. Nationalised by the National Coal Board, continual investment was required to clear falls etc and keep roadways open at the extreme depths. Changing economics lead to a reduction in the workforce from the 1950s, and the mine ceased production in 1968.

A majority of the men were transferred to the new Blaenant drift mine, built to extract coal form the No.2 Rhondda seam at a shallower depth. One of the two shafts at Cefn Coed was used to ventilate Blaenant, and as an emergency exit, until the closure of Blaenant in 1990.

== Museum ==
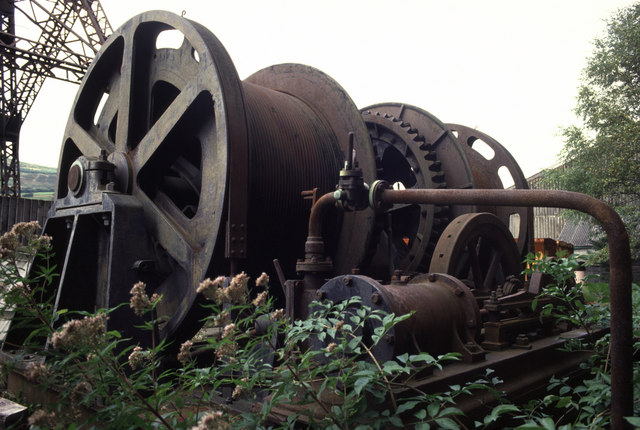
Steam capstan engine for cable changing

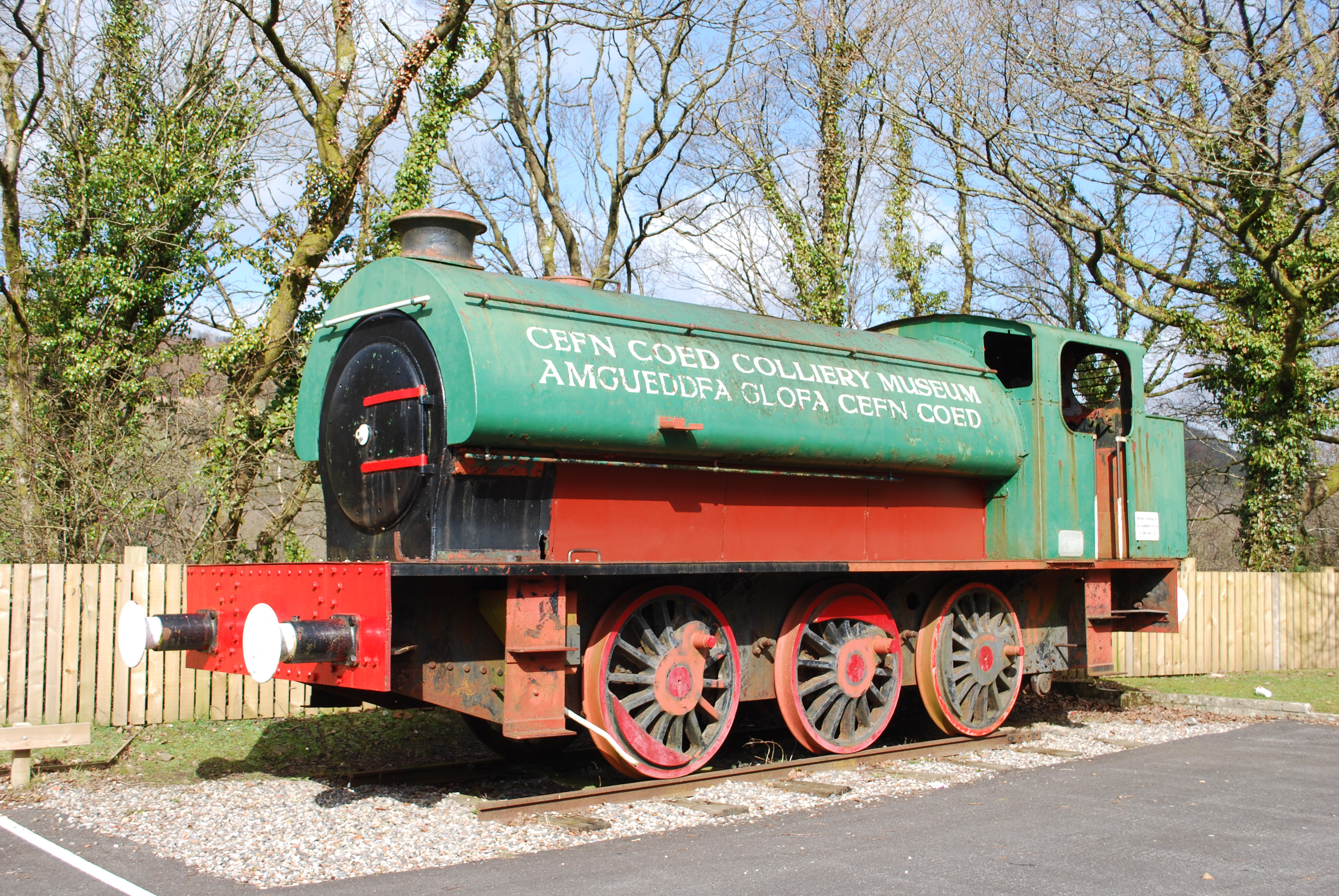
Hunslet Austerity 0-6-0ST No. 2758, acts as a gate guard to the museum

The complete above ground mine workings remain intact on site, with the steam winding engine from No.2 shaft now electrically driven.

Manufactured in 1927, the Worsley Mesne steam winding engine sits in the boiler house with its suite of six Lancashire steam boilers. The engine has two cylinders with a bore of 32 in (81 cm), while the drum is 10 ft (3.0 m) wide. The drum held two ropes each over 800 yd (730 m) long, with a breaking strain of 234 tons. The cables were inspected everyday, weight tested every three months and replaced completely every 2½ years. Every six months they were shortened by about 6 ft (1.8 m) in order to eliminate wear and stress at the end of the rope.

There is no access to the underground workings within the museum, but a simulated gallery provides full accessibility for blind and disabled visitors. As well as artefacts from the mining industry, the museum also houses a restored and unique gas tram, which ran in Neath until 1920.

The museum is an anchor point on the European Route of Industrial Heritage.
