= Global Centre of Rail Excellence =

Future railway testing site in Wales

Global Centre of Rail Excellence (GCRE)
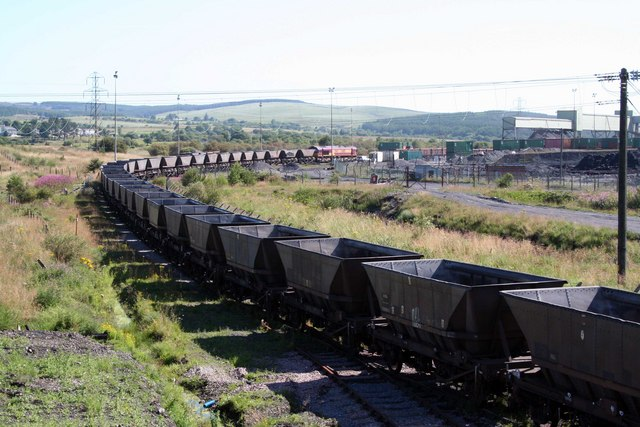
- Coal wagons arrive at Onllwyn for loading - this site will be redeveloped
- Interactive map of Global Centre of Rail Excellence (GCRE)

Location
- Location: Onllwyn, Wales
- Coordinates: 51.782°N 3.675°W
- OS grid: SN843106

Characteristics
- Type: Testing centre

History
- Opened: 2023 (initial sidings); 2030 (projected full opening)

The Global Centre of Rail Excellence (GCRE) is a train and railway infrastructure and technology testing facility currently under construction. It is located in Onllwyn, Wales in the Dulais Valley.

The centre is located on a 700 hectares (1,700 acres) site, taking land from the Nant Helen surface mine, and the Onllwyn coal washery. Ownership of the site was transferred to the Welsh government in October 2022. Construction will take place in three phases, initial works focus on sidings, then the two electrified test tracks; more comprehensive facilities, including maintenance and research buildings, a business park, and hotel, are to be built in the third phase.

The GCRE is expected to open sometime in 2030. In the long term, it is intended for the GCRE to be operated as a commercial entity and majority owned by the private sector; a competitive bidding process for investors to purchase a majority stake in the company has been launched with the aim of achieving this model. Partnerships and other agreements have been struck by the GCRE with various other organisations, including Talgo, Hitachi, and Thales’ Ground Transportation Systems, to make use of the site's facilities; a membership model has been envisioned by the GCRE's management. While considerable attention has been paid to garnering business domestically, the company also offers its services to international railway companies, particularly those on the European continent.

On 15 July 2025, it was announced that the opening of the site would be delayed until 2030 due to a lack of funding.

== History ==
The site, which is at the head of the Dulais and Tawe valleys, had been used for coal production for 200 years, ending in August 2022. It was a deep-mine complex until 1980 when open-casting became the preferred method of extracting. The surface mine was named Nant Helen, and the washery was known as Onllwyn. Both locations were owned by Celtic Energy, who agreed to donate the site to the Welsh Government when coaling operations have finished. The United Kingdom has no all-purpose testing centre for railway vehicles and infrastructure, with most vehicles being tested in Europe such as at Wildenrath in Germany, or Velim, in the Czech Republic. (Note: The French rail authorities were looking at installing a similar centre near to Pas-de-Calais, but they had trouble finding sufficient space.)

The development of the site was announced on 25 June 2018, and listed as costing £100 million, then at £150 million in June 2021, but by August 2022, the expected cost was £220 million. £78 million of the total amount is public money; £50 million is being provided by the Welsh Government, and £28 million by the UK Government. Whilst the primary aim is for testing facilities for trains and equipment entering service on railways across Britain, the business model of the project seeks to offer its testing services to continental railway systems (such as DB and SNCF).

Development of the GCRE has faced some scepticism, often raising questions over its value to the established railway companies; some figures have stated that, as most UK production is geared up around Newton Aycliffe (Hitachi) and Derby (Bombardier/Alstom), the rolling stock manufacturers would have preferred a location that was nearer to (or between) those two manufacturing sites. The GCRE site in West Wales has been viewed as being "out on a limb", although its proximity to the docks at Swansea means that the site is accessible by ship-borne delivery. Additionally, the A465 road (known as the "Heads of the Valleys road"), is to be upgraded to dual carriageway status, which will provide a viable road link to the site. In August 2020, the GCRE was given authority to proceed with conversion of the site by councillors from the Powys County, and Neath Port Talbot Councils. In October 2022, ownership of the 700 hectare site was formally obtained by the Welsh government. The GCRE site straddles the two local council areas, Neath Port Talbot and Powys.

== Activities ==
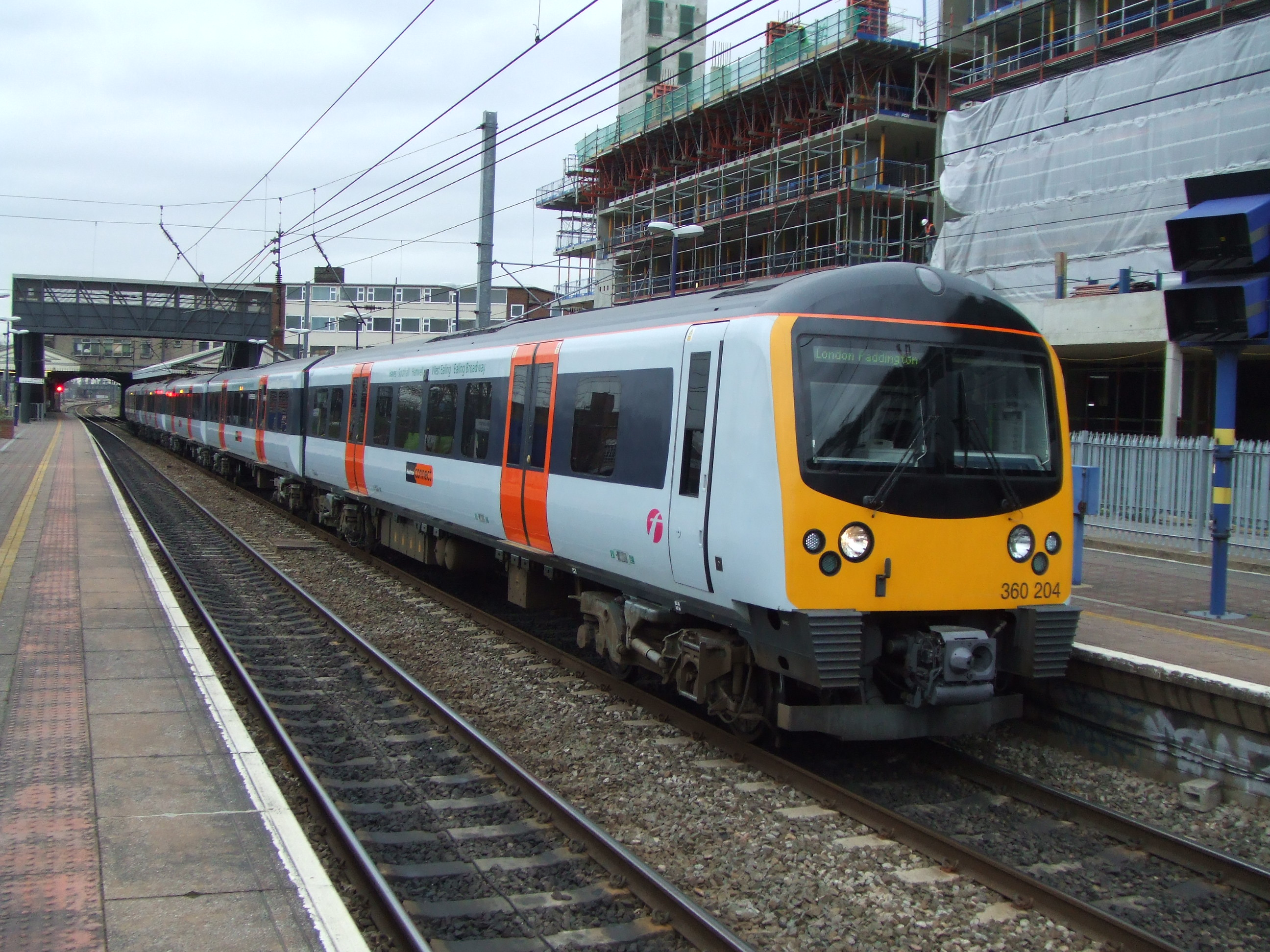
Three Class 360s have been acquired for testing

In October 2022, it was announced that the GCRE had launched a procurement process for the construction of its test tracks and associated facilities, the collective contracts involved being valued at £250 million. That same month, the organisation took delivery of its first electric trains; these will be used to haul test trains and host test apparatus. The first phase of the site was originally hoped to up and running by 2023, with the centre being at full operating capability by 2025. Storage sidings are to be installed in 2023, which will generate initial revenue for the site, as storage space for railway vehicles is in short supply on the UK network. During the second phase, the two electrified loops will be constructed along with the supporting infrastructure and buildings. The third phase of the work will see the addition of further stabling, maintenance, and research facilities, along with a business park and hotel, in 2025.

The test area will consist of two railway loops; the smaller will be set at 40 miles per hour (64 km/h) and extend for 2.5 miles (4 km), and the second at 109 miles per hour (175 km/h) and running to 4.3 miles (6.9 km). The unusual shape of the loops has been dictated by the 400kV power grid which runs from Pembrokeshire to Gloucestershire; moving the pylons would have been a complex and costly task. The smaller inner loop is for infrastructure testing, which will see heavy passenger and freight trains running 16 hours a day for five days a week. This is to replicate a normal busy line, which will generate 40,000 axle passes per year, thus allowing testing and degradation on the railway infrastructure - something described as being unique in Europe. The centre is connected to the national network at Swansea via the old branch line to Onllwyn, part of the original Brecon railway. Power for the site is to be generated from local wind farms and an on-site solar farm. The owners of the site wish to make the GCRE the United Kingdom's first net zero railway.

During December 2022, it was announced that global investors, comprising both individual entities and consortiums, were being contracted ahead of a formal procurement process on the acquisition of a majority stake in GCRE Ltd; at the time, the company was wholly owned by the Welsh government. It is intended for the site to be operated as a commercial entity rather than as a state-owned body. In April 2023, a formal invitation to tender was delivered to several pre-qualified organisations, requesting bids to be submitted for a majority stake in the GRCE.

During February 2023, it was announced that the GRCE would be providing funding for 24 railway-related innovation projects, which included Graphene-enhanced concrete sleepers, low-carbon acoustic barriers, greener electrification apparatus, and rapid tunnelling techniques.

In April 2023, the rolling stock manufacturer Hitachi announced that it had agreed terms with the GCRE to have its various product lines tested at the site following its completion. Hitachi has stated that its British-built rolling stock, digital signalling, battery storage, and other railway infrastructure technologies will be developed with the GCRE's support; this arrangement will be more flexible and present more opportunities for testing than the present practice of using the active British railway network. In the following month, another commercial client, Transport for Wales Rail (TfWR), signed an agreement with the GCRE under which the former became a premium member of the site, which will host and conduct testing and R&D in collaboration with TfWR. The arrangement may later be extended to the use of other GCRE services, such as storage, training, and product approvals. Thales’ Ground Transportation Systems also signed a partnership agreement with the GCRE to collaborate on the development of new railway technologies, such as digital signalling, autonomous operations, communications, ticketing and cybersecurity. In May 2023, the GCRE took delivery of its first railway carriage, provided by the rolling stock manufacturer Talgo, that marked the start of a partnership between the two companies.
