= Sennybridge =

Village in Powys, Wales

Coordinates: 51.946°N 3.569°W

Sennybridge: Welsh: Pontsenni
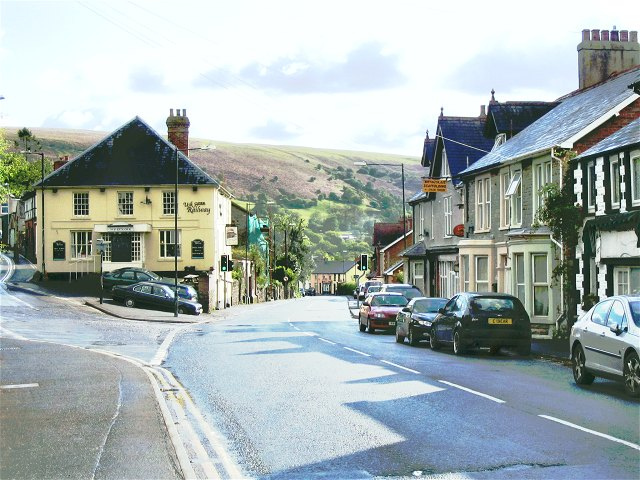
- Sennybridge, view southwest down High Street

- Location within Powys
- OS grid reference: SN9228
- Community: Maescar
- Principal area: Powys
- Preserved county: Powys
- Country: Wales
- Sovereign state: United Kingdom
- Post town: BRECON
- Postcode district: LD3
- Dialling code: 01874
- Police: Dyfed-Powys
- Fire: Mid and West Wales
- Ambulance: Welsh
- UK Parliament: Brecon & Radnorshire
- Senedd Cymru – Welsh Parliament: Brecon & Radnorshire

Sennybridge (Welsh: Pontsenni) is a village in Powys, Wales, in the historic county of Brecknockshire, situated some 42 miles (68 km) from Cardiff and 31 miles (50 km) from Swansea. It lies 9 miles (14 km) west of Brecon on the A40 trunk road to Llandovery, at the point where the Afon Senni flows into the Usk. It is in the community of Maescar.

== Economy ==
One factor that influenced the growth of Sennybridge was the Neath and Brecon Railway, which opened a station in the adjoining village of Defynnog in 1867. The promoter and contractor of the railway, John Dickson, also made a start on constructing a railway north from Sennybridge that would have linked the Neath and Brecon Railway to the Central Wales Line at Llangammarch Wells but work was suspended on his bankruptcy in 1867 and never resumed. The partially completed earthworks can still be seen in the countryside north of Sennybridge.

In an earlier era, in about 1821 the Brecon Forest Tramroad started construction. The northern terminus of the route from the Swansea Valley (via Crai) was at Castell-Du Farm at Sennybridge. The tramroad, operated by horse-drawn wagons, came down to a loading platform adjacent to the modern A40 road at the west end of the village. The modern alignment of the A40 road was only made possible (as a turnpike road) when the bridge across the Senni was built. Prior to this, the road west to Llandovery went down to the River Usk and crossed it by the ford at Rhyd y Briw, which must have been subject to the state of the river! The ramp down to the ford and the line of the ford across the Usk is still visible. The earthworks for the tramroad can be seen on the west side of the road from Defynnog to Crai, although care is needed in the interpretation as some of the earthworks were re-used for the later Neath and Brecon Railway.

== Climate ==
Climate data for Sennybridge, elevation: 307 m (1,007 ft), 1991–2020 normals
Month	Jan	Feb	Mar	Apr	May	Jun	Jul	Aug	Sep	Oct	Nov	Dec	Year
Record high °C (°F)	13.2 (55.8)	16.7 (62.1)	20.2 (68.4)	23.5 (74.3)	29.8 (85.6)	31.6 (88.9)	32.5 (90.5)	32.3 (90.1)	28.1 (82.6)	25.0 (77.0)	16.0 (60.8)	13.6 (56.5)	32.5 (90.5)
Mean daily maximum °C (°F)	6.0 (42.8)	6.4 (43.5)	8.7 (47.7)	11.6 (52.9)	14.7 (58.5)	17.2 (63.0)	18.8 (65.8)	18.5 (65.3)	16.2 (61.2)	12.5 (54.5)	8.9 (48.0)	6.4 (43.5)	12.2 (54.0)
Daily mean °C (°F)	3.3 (37.9)	3.4 (38.1)	5.1 (41.2)	7.3 (45.1)	10.1 (50.2)	12.8 (55.0)	14.5 (58.1)	14.2 (57.6)	12.1 (53.8)	9.2 (48.6)	5.9 (42.6)	3.7 (38.7)	8.5 (47.3)
Mean daily minimum °C (°F)	0.6 (33.1)	0.5 (32.9)	1.5 (34.7)	2.9 (37.2)	5.5 (41.9)	8.3 (46.9)	10.2 (50.4)	10.0 (50.0)	8.0 (46.4)	5.9 (42.6)	3.0 (37.4)	1.0 (33.8)	4.8 (40.6)
Record low °C (°F)	−14.7 (5.5)	−11.3 (11.7)	−10.1 (13.8)	−7.6 (18.3)	−4.7 (23.5)	−0.5 (31.1)	0.2 (32.4)	1.4 (34.5)	−1.9 (28.6)	−7.3 (18.9)	−15.6 (3.9)	−14.4 (6.1)	−15.6 (3.9)
Average precipitation mm (inches)	171.8 (6.76)	136.0 (5.35)	117.8 (4.64)	94.8 (3.73)	93.7 (3.69)	90.1 (3.55)	102.3 (4.03)	112.6 (4.43)	116.9 (4.60)	168.7 (6.64)	168.8 (6.65)	192.1 (7.56)	1,565.6 (61.64)
Average precipitation days (≥ 1.0 mm)	18.8	15.5	14.8	13.6	13.3	12.4	13.9	15.1	13.4	17.2	18.6	18.8	185.3
Source 1: Met Office
Source 2: Starlings Roost Weather

== Landmarks ==
An extensive area of land to the north of Sennybridge is used by the Ministry of Defence for military training purposes. Sennybridge Camp and Army Field Training Centre, known as SENTA, is one of the major bases for Infantry Warfare Training by the British Army in the UK.

== Education ==
Sennybridge's primary school, which houses a Welsh Language Unit, utilises the old Secondary Modern buildings in the village. Although the school is in Sennybridge, it continued to be named Defynnog Primary School until the 1980s when its name was changed to Sennybridge Primary School.

== Notable people ==
- William Rees-Thomas CB FRCP FRSM (1887–1978), a Welsh psychiatrist was born in Senny.
- Tom Rees, born in 1895, at Cefnbrynich, near the town, was the first official victim of the "Red Baron"—German flying ace Manfred von Richthofen.
- Rhydian Roberts (born 1983), a baritone singer, TV presenter and musical theatre actor; finished second in The X Factor (British series 4).
- Margaret Clifford had her Smooth Fox Terrier kennels in Castle Road, Sennybridge - from this location, she won Best of Breed at Crufts 2007 (results) with her dog Migley Sirrah Jack - a billboard for the local newspaper (the Brecon and Radnor Express) at Sennybridge Texaco stated "Senny Pooch is Top Dog" .
