= Coelbren =

Village in mid Wales

Coordinates: 51°47′30″N 3°40′07″W

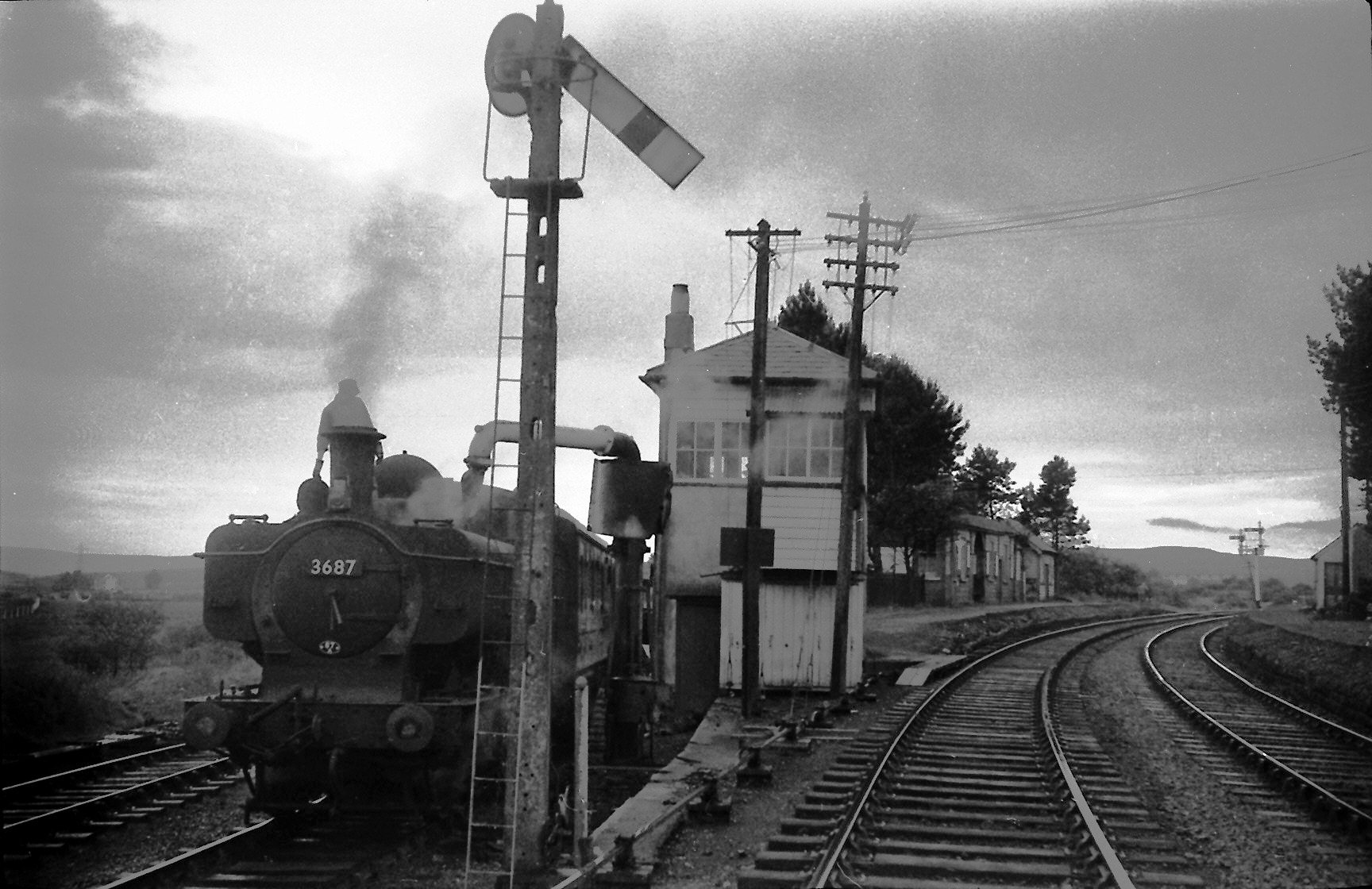
A Neath-Brecon train at Coelbren Junction shortly before closure in December 1962

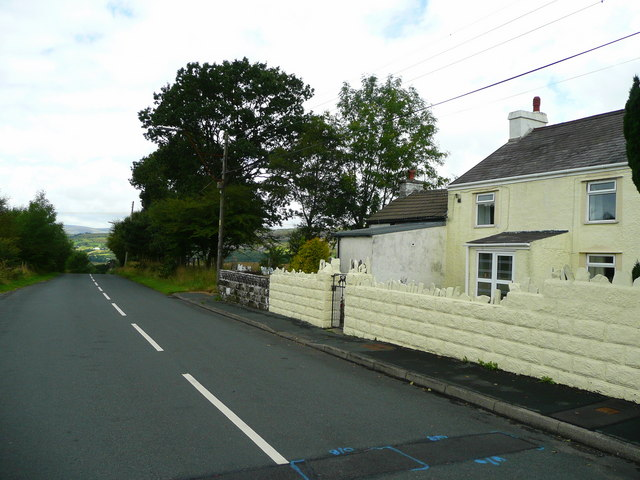

Coelbren (Welsh: Y Coelbren) is a small rural village within the community of Tawe Uchaf in southernmost Powys, Wales. It lies on the very northern edge of the South Wales Coalfield some six miles north-east of Ystradgynlais and just outside the southern boundary of the Brecon Beacons National Park. It is known for Henrhyd Falls, a 27m high waterfall which serves as a National Trust-managed visitor attraction on the Nant Llech. To the east of the village flows the Afon Pyrddin which plunges over two more spectacular falls.

As first edition Ordnance Survey maps of the area show, the name 'Coelbren' applied to a farmhouse and chapel before the modern village developed and is recorded in the name Tyre y Kolbren in 1503 where it signifies the sharing of land (modern Welsh 'tir') by means of drawing lots, a 'coelbren' being translated amongst other things as an 'inscribed piece of wood' or 'omen-stick'.

== History ==
The Roman road of Sarn Helen runs close to the village on its eastern side. Its remains and that of a Roman fort are now much degraded. The Brecon Forest Tramroad was constructed through the village in the 1820s. Of note to the east of Coelbren is the site of Banwen Ironworks, whose partial survival is owed to its early failure. It was constructed in the 1840s by speculators from London but may have produced only 80 tons of pig iron, the whole exercise being enveloped in a financial scandal.

From the 1873, Coelbren was the location of a significant junction on the Neath and Brecon Railway whence a 7-mile branch diverged leading to the Swansea Vale Railway at Ynysygeinon. The contractor John Dickson had a terrace of houses constructed quite possibly for navvies working on the line and known originally as Dickson's Row though now known as Price's Row. The lines closed in 1962 though the trackbed can still be seen almost encircling the eastern part of the village. The route to Swansea Vale has now been converted into a cycleway as Route 43 of the National Cycle Network linking the village with Ystradgynlais; it is planned that the trackbed northwards towards Brecon should also form part of Route 43.

A school was opened in the village in 1894, housed at first in the vestry of Moriah Baptist Chapel. It was transferred to a new purpose-built site further west on Heol Eglwys in 1898 and in 1912 it was greatly expanded. The original Coelbren Welfare and Memorial Hall was built towards the top of Station Road in 1925 and served until the 1990s when the current building was constructed.

The A4221 road linking Abercraf with the A4109 Inter Valley Road (Glynneath to Aberdulais) near Dyffryn Cellwen passes to the immediate south of the village, its construction later in the 20th century rendering the village less isolated than it had been hitherto.
