= Cwrt Herbert =

Coordinates: 51.667°N 3.817°W

- Location within Neath Port Talbot
- OS grid reference: SN744981
- Principal area: Neath Port Talbot
- Preserved county: West Glamorgan
- Country: Wales
- Sovereign state: United Kingdom
- Post town: Neath
- Police: South Wales
- Fire: Mid and West Wales
- Ambulance: Welsh

Cwrt Herbert, also sometimes called Court Herbert, is a small community to the east of Neath Abbey in south Wales. It developed as a mining village servicing the Cwrt Herbert Colliery in the mid 19th century. The colliery closed in 1929.

A Roman fort named Nidum was found in the village, and is now mostly within the ground of Dwr-y-Felin Comprehensive School.
