= Richard Aaron =

Welsh philosopher (1901–1987)

Richard Ithamar Aaron
- Born: 6 November 1901; Blaendulais, Glamorgan, Wales
- Died: 29 March 1987 (aged 85); Aberystwyth, Ceredigion, Wales
- Occupations: Swansea University; Aberystwyth University
- Spouse: Rhiannon Morgan (m. 1937)
- Children: 5, including Jane

Philosophical work
- Era: Contemporary philosophy
- Region: British philosophy
- Main interests: John Locke, Welsh literature

Richard Ithamar Aaron, FBA (6 November 1901 – 29 March 1987), was a Welsh philosopher who became an authority on the work of John Locke. He also wrote a history of philosophy in the Welsh language.

== Early life and education ==
Born in Blaendulais, Glamorgan, Aaron was the son of a Welsh Baptist draper, William Aaron, and his wife, Margaret Griffith. He was educated at Ystalyfera Grammar School, then at the University of Wales from 1918, where he studied history and philosophy. In 1923 he was elected a Fellow of the university, allowing him to attend Oriel College, Oxford, where he gained a DPhil in 1928 for a dissertation on "The History and Value of the Distinction between Intellect and Intuition".

== Career ==
In 1926 Aaron was appointed a lecturer in the Department of Philosophy at the University College of Swansea. After the retirement of W. Jenkyn Jones in 1932, Aaron was appointed to the chair of philosophy at University College of Wales, Aberystwyth where he settled, initially on the nearby hill of Bryn Hir and later at Garth Celyn.

Although his early publications focused on epistemology and the history of ideas, Aaron became fascinated with the work and life of John Locke. The interest was sparked by his discovery of unexamined information in the Lovelace Collection: notes and drafts left by John Locke to his cousin Peter King. There he found letters, notebooks, catalogues, and most pertinently, an early draft of Locke's "An Essay Concerning Human Understanding", hitherto presumed missing. Aaron's research led to the 1937 publication of a book on the life and work of Locke that subsequently became an accepted standard work. The proofs were read by Rhiannon Morgan, whom Aaron married in 1937. They had five children. One of their children is Welsh literature specialist Jane Aaron, born in 1951.

Aaron produced several more books and articles, including a book in Welsh on the history of philosophy, Hanes athroniaeth—o Descartes i Hegel in 1932. His attempts to boost interest in philosophy in Wales included establishing in that year a philosophy section at the University of Wales Guild of Graduates, which still conducts its proceedings in Welsh. From 1938 to 1968 he was the editor of the Welsh journal Efrydiau Athronyddol ('Philosophical Studies').

Other notable publications of Aaron's include "Two Senses of the Word Universal" (1939) and "Our Knowledge of Universals", a study read to the British Academy in 1945 and published in its Proceedings and as a separate monograph. Aaron's fascination with the idea of a universal culminated in The Theory of Universals (1952). Here, he attacks the notion of universals as Platonic forms, but is as critical of Aristotelian realism on essences as he is of nominalism and conceptualism as theories of universals.

In 1952–1953, Aaron was a visiting professor at Yale University. In 1956, he was able to study the third draft of Locke's An Essay Concerning Human Understanding at the Pierpont Morgan Library, which led to a substantial addition to the second edition of John Locke, published in 1955. He became a Fellow of the British Academy (FBA) and president of the Mind Association in the same year. In 1956, the Joint Session of the Aristotelian Society and Mind Association (publisher of the journal Mind) was held in Aberystwyth, and Aaron gave the inaugural lecture. In 1957 he was elected President of the Aristotelian Society.

In 1967, Aaron published a second edition of The Theory of Universals with a new preface and several additions and rewritten chapters. In 1971, he published a third edition of his Locke biography and the book Knowing and the Function of Reason, which includes broad discussion of the laws of non-contradiction, excluded middle and identity, of the use of language in speech and thought, and of substance and causality.

After retiring in 1969, he taught for a semester at Carlton College, Minnesota, before returning to Wales, where he helped to write articles for the 1974 edition of the Encyclopædia Britannica. He began to feel the effects of Alzheimer's disease and died at his home in Aberystwyth on 29 March 1987.

== Selected works ==
- Aaron, Richard (1930). The Nature of Knowing. London: Williams & Norgate. OCLC 18633058.
- ----- (1932). Hanes Athroniaeth o Descartes i Hegel [History of Philosophy from Descartes to Hegel] (in Welsh). Caerdydd: Gwasg Prifysgol Cymru. OCLC 21747278.
- ----- (ed. with J. Gibb) An Early Draft of Locke's Essay, Oxford: Clarendon Press. 1936.
- ----- (1971) [1937]. John Locke (3rd ed.). Oxford: Clarendon. ISBN 978-0-19-824355-7. OCLC 490103200.
- ----- (1945). "Our Knowledge of Universals". Proceedings Of The British Academy. Oxford University Press.
- -----The Theory of Universals (2nd ed.). Oxford: Clarendon. 1967 [1952]. OCLC 307324.
- ----- (1971). Knowing and the Function of Reason. Oxford: Clarendon. ISBN 978-0-19-824351-9. OCLC 263355808.

== See also ==
- John Locke

== Sources ==
- Jones, O. R. (1988). "Richard Ithamar Aaron, 1901–1987" (PDF). Proceedings of the British Academy, 1987. Vol. 73. London: Oxford University Press. ISSN 2753-6777.
