= Dyffryn Cellwen =

Coordinates: 51°46′35″N 03°39′50″W

Dyffryn Cellwen is a village in the County Borough of Neath Port Talbot, South Wales. It is situated in the upper Dulais Valley near the junction of the A4109 and A4221 roads, northwest of the smaller settlement of Banwen. It is part of the community of Onllwyn.

The village stands close to the course of the Roman road from the fort at Nidum (Neath) to Y Gaer (Brecon), and there are traces of a Roman fort and camp nearby. (See Banwen for details of the Roman sites.) At one time, mining for iron, copper, and especially coal were important activities in the area.
