= Henrhyd Falls =

Waterfall in Wales

Coordinates: 51.7943°N 3.6633°W

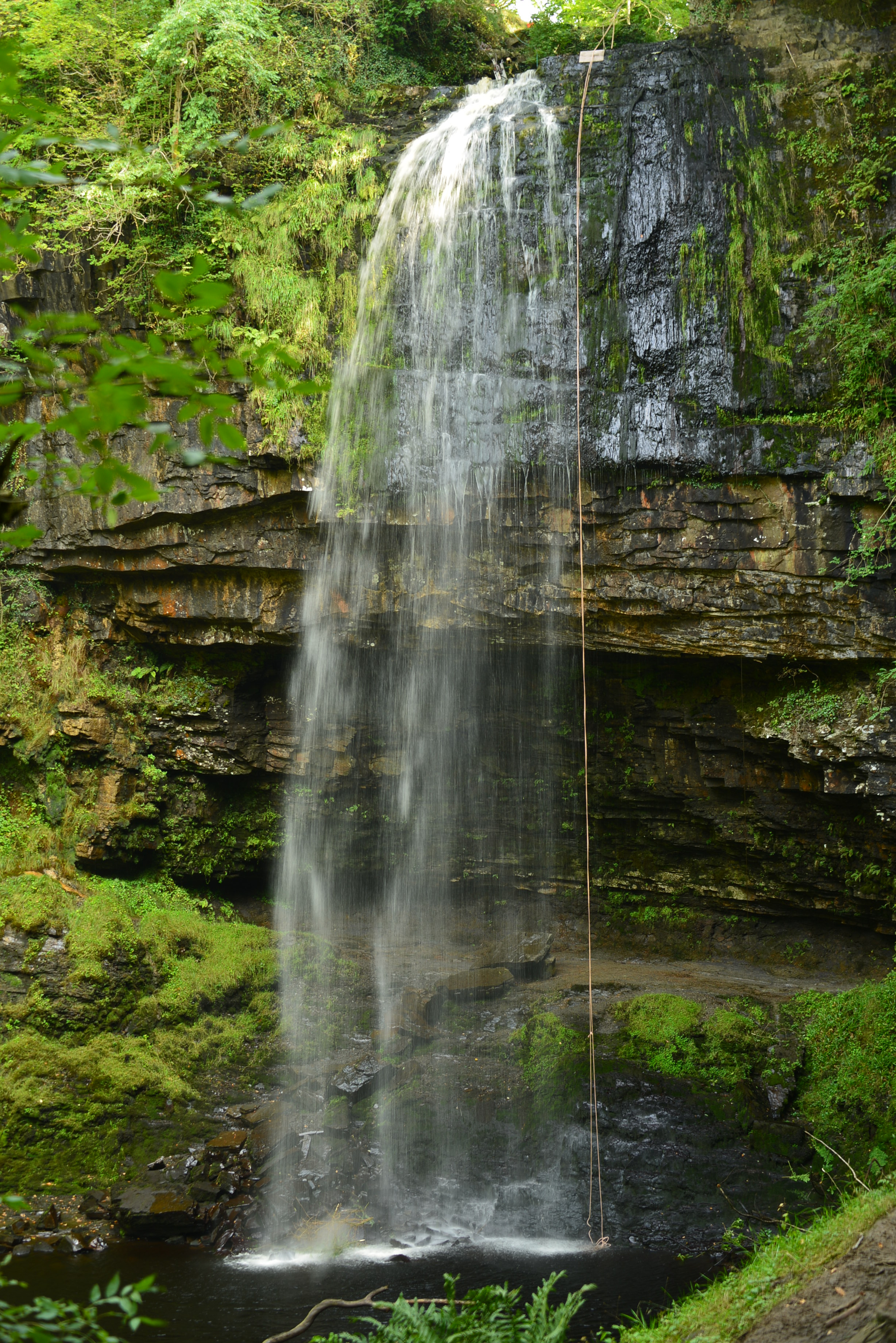
- Henrhyd Waterfall.
- Interactive map of Henrhyd Falls
- Location: Brecon Beacons National Park, Wales
- Total height: 90 feet (27 m)
- Watercourse: Nant Llech

Henrhyd Falls (Welsh: Sgwd Henrhyd) in the Brecon Beacons National Park, Wales, is the tallest waterfall in southern Wales, with a drop of 90 feet (27 m). Famous for its appearance as the entrance to the Batcave in The Dark Knight trilogy directed by Christopher Nolan. It lies on National Trust land, in the county of Powys. The nearest settlement is Coelbren, on the road between Glynneath and Abercraf. Though not in the core of the area, it is considered by many to constitute a part of Wales' celebrated Waterfall Country.

== Geology ==
The falls occur where a small river, the Nant Llech (grid reference SN854122), drops over the faulted edge of a hard sandstone known as the Farewell Rock which forms the top half of the rock face and the base of the South Wales Coal Measures. Beneath this, and forming much of the recessed portion of the drop, is the Subcrenatum Sandstone separated from the Farewell Rock above by the Subcrenatum marine band. Both the marine band and sandstone are part of the Bishopston Mudstone Formation included within the Marros Group, the modern name in South Wales for the assemblage of strata that was traditionally known as the Millstone Grit series. A stream gully between the descent path and the falls marks the line of the Henrhyd Fault which is responsible for the falls' presence.

One of the area's most famous visitors was Sir William Edmond Logan (later head of the Geological Survey of Canada). In 1833 he carried out detailed geological survey work in the area, discovering a mile (1.5 km) down the valley from the foot of the falls the fossil trees that now stand in the garden at Swansea Museum. They are 'Object 1' in their 'History of Swansea in 20 Objects'.

== Access ==
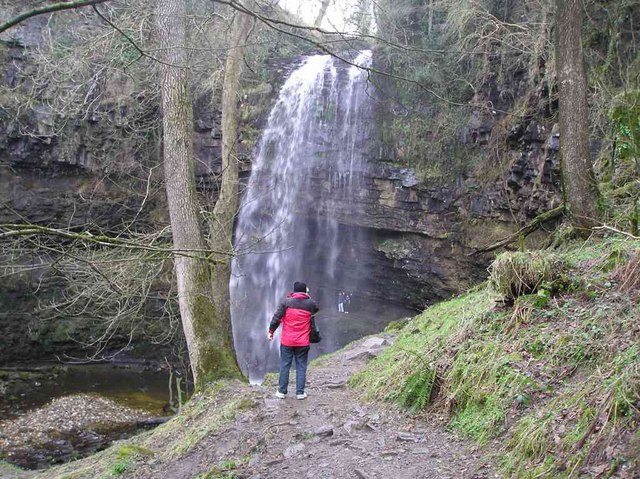
View of the falls showing the undercut rock behind the falls

The waterfall is reached after a steep walk down into the valley from the car park established by the National Trust, and is a popular spot to visit. A further footpath leads steeply down to the falls via the opposite side of the valley, accessed from Dol Henrhyd, the road to Coelbren village.

== See also ==
- List of waterfalls
- List of waterfalls in Wales
- Ystradfellte
