= Nant Llech =

River in Powys, Wales

Coordinates: 51°48′05″N 3°41′32″W

The Nant Llech is a minor river in Powys, Wales and which lies wholly within the Brecon Beacons National Park. The name means 'slab stream', presumably in reference to the sandstones across which it runs. Its headwater streams, the Nant Llech Pellaf and the Nant Llech Isaf join forces at Blaen Llech and then continue westwards as the Nant Llech for 3 km / 2 mi to a confluence with the River Tawe just east of the village of Abercraf.

== Waterfall ==
The most famous feature of the river is Henrhyd Falls (Sgwd Henrhyd or Rhaeadr Henrhyd in Welsh), a 27m/90 ft high fall where the river plunges over the edge of a band of hard sandstone known as the 'Farewell Rock' into a deep plunge pool. The river continues below in a steep wooded gorge cut into mudstones and sandstones of the Carboniferous age Coal Measures. The falls are owned and managed by the National Trust which provides a free car park off the minor road between Coelbren and Pen-y-cae for visitors wanting to explore the area.

A public footpath runs the length of the valley though part runs across a landslip area which has been active in recent years. The river gorge is a site of special scientific interest. Sir William Edmond Logan, first director of the Geological Survey of Canada discovered some fossil trees near the base of the falls. These are now on display outside Swansea Museum.
