= Onllwyn =

Village in Neath Port Talbot, Wales

- Location within Neath Port Talbot
- Population: 1,194 (2011 census)
- OS grid reference: SN842102
- Principal area: Neath Port Talbot
- Preserved county: West Glamorgan
- Country: Wales
- Sovereign state: United Kingdom
- Post town: NEATH
- Postcode district: SA10
- Dialling code: 01639
- Police: South Wales
- Fire: Mid and West Wales
- Ambulance: Welsh
- UK Parliament: Neath
- Senedd Cymru – Welsh Parliament: Neath
- List of places UK Wales Neath Port Talbot 51.77845°N 3.67994°W Map of the community

Onllwyn (Welsh pronunciation: [ˈɔnɬʊɨn]) is a small village and community in Neath Port Talbot, Wales, near Seven Sisters. The community area also covers the small settlements of Dyffryn Cellwen and Banwen. To the north is Coelbren, Powys, while to the east the Afon Pyrddin forms the boundaries of both Powys and the Brecon Beacons National Park.

== History ==
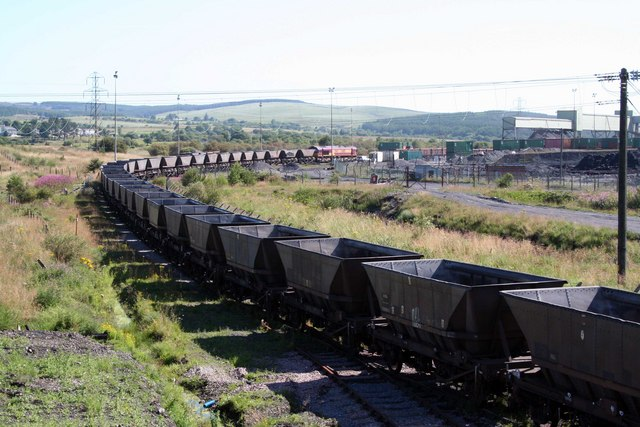
EWS Class 66 shunts empty coal wagons towards the coal washery

First developed by the Romans, the local village Banwen sits astride the Roman road of Sarn Helen. There are two Roman forts and the remains of a further Roman road within the community.

Local tradition has it that St Patrick was born here and taken prisoner to Ireland by Irish raiders. A memorial stone in Banwen is the focus of celebrations and marches held on St Patrick's Day (March 17) to mark the event.

The parish was a centre of coal mining for over 200 years; there were once five pits that employed hundreds of men. Now all that remains is a coal washery and processing plant. On the route of the former Neath and Brecon Railway, there was a freight only line to the washery from the South Wales Main Line at Neath. The site of the washery (and the nearby Nant Helen surface mine) is being redeveloped as the Global Centre of Rail Excellence.

Onllwyn was involved in several 20th-century coal mining strikes which brought the town notoriety. The political, labour and cultural connections between Onllwyn and the American coal mining region of Appalachia grew into an in-person cultural exchange in the 1970s. Musical performances took place at Onllwyn Miners' Welfare Hall in 1976, including one by The Strange Creek Singers featuring American musicians Hazel Dickens, Alice Gerrard, Mike Seeger, Tracy Schwartz, and Lamar Grier. The exchange was facilitated and filmed by Helen Lewis and John Gaventa.

Onllwyn was also the setting for Pride, the award-winning 2014 film written by Stephen Beresford and directed by Matthew Warchus. The movie chronicles the true story of a group of lesbian and gay activists who raised money to help families affected by the British miners' strike in 1984.

Map of Onllwyn area. Three of the larger 20th century coalmines are shown as grey dots. Other locations of note are shown as red dots.

== Present ==
Commanding views of the Brecon Beacons, this now semi-rural location is popular for retired people. There is a Community College, "Dove Workshops", village shop, post office, pub, and association football and rugby union teams.

== Government and politics ==
Onllwyn is in the parliamentary constituency of Neath.

Following a 2020 boundary review by the Local Democracy and Boundary Commission for Wales, Onllwyn was joined by the neighbouring communities of Crynant and Seven Sisters to become 'Crynant, Onllwyn and Seven Sisters' electoral ward, effective from the 2022 local elections. Two councillors are elected to Neath Port Talbot County Borough Council.

The former ward of Onllwyn consisted of some or all of the following settlements: Banwen, Dyffryn Cellwen and Onllwyn.

Onllwyn was bounded by the wards of Abercraf and Tawe Uchaf (both in Powys) to the north; Glynneath to the southeast; and Seven Sisters to the south west.

In the 2017 local council elections, the electorate turnout was 42%. The results were:

Candidate	Party	Votes	Status
George Cawsey	Labour	273	Labour hold
Peter Westall	Independent	248	

== Residents of note ==
- Dai Francis, NUM trade unionist and father of MP Hywel Francis, was born in Onllwyn, and took as his bardic name "Dai o'r Onllwyn".
