= Nidum =

Roman camp at Neath, Wales

Coordinates: 51.665°N 3.814°W

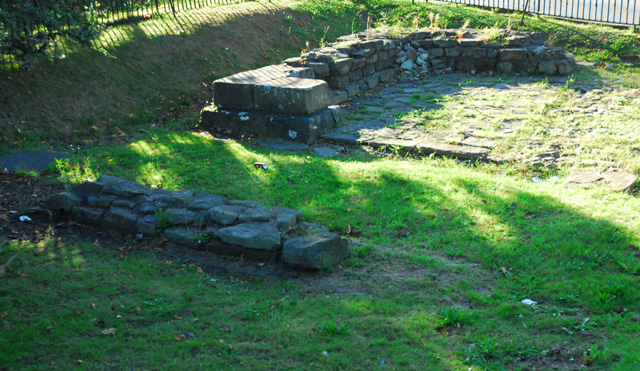
Remains of the south-east gate entrance to the Roman fort at Nidum

Map of the ramparts of Nidum Roman Auxiliary Fort, overlaid on a map of the Neath Abbey area of Neath, South Wales.

Nidum is a Roman fort found in Cwrt Herbert near the town of Neath, in Wales. An Auxiliary fort first built in around AD 74 from earth banks and wooden structures, it underwent a reduction in size from 3.3 hectares (8 acres) to 2.3 hectares (6 acres) soon afterwards. It may have been garrisoned by perhaps 500 auxiliary troops. It was abandoned in around 125, but re-occupied around 140 when it was rebuilt in stone. However it was only occupied until 170, with 100 years of disuse before a final period in use from 275 to 320.

== Name and road evidence ==
The name Nidum was well attested by the 19th century. It is included in the Antonine Itinerary, a Roman period register of forts and distances along various routes around the Roman world. Iter 12 of the Britannia Itineraries, adjusting for errors in the medieval transcriptions, places Nidum 14 miles east of Leucarum (modern day Loughor), and 27 miles west of Bomio (an unknown fort, possibly Cowbridge). Bomio is itself listed as being 28 miles from Isca Augusta (modern day Caerleon). In the west the road is believed to have continued a further 23 miles from Leucarum to Moridunum, the fort and walled town at Carmarthen.

The clear similarity of Nidum and the Welsh Nedd, helped confirm that a Roman Fort must have been built in the Neath area. Often identifiable lines of Roman roads have led straight to fort locations. However no evidence remains of the Roman roads leaving Neath either to the east or west. The routes are presumed to have existed however and are given the RCAHMW numbers 'RR60c' (to the east) and RR60d (to the west). These routes are classed as 'predicted' in the viscinity of Neath, so were no help in locating the fort of Nidum.

To the north-east another unknown route leads to the well-defined Roman road designated RR622. It runs to Y Gaer, (Brecon), via the 'Coelbren Fort' at Banwen, which is 18 kilometres (11 mi) north-east of Nidum. This is one of various Roman roads in Wales traditionally known as the Sarn Helen.

== Archaeological evidence ==
The site was first identified in 1949 during work on the A474 road, which found the south-west gateway. A year later the south-east gateway was also discovered. Various excavations related to school or other building works took place in 1958, 1962, 1984–85 and 2011. Finds recovered from these digs included roof and floor tiles, pieces of a 1st-century amphora, fragments of kitchenware and tableware ranging in date from the earliest construction phase to the early 2nd century. One or two pieces are from the mid 2nd century. Six coins were also found, ranging from Augustus (r. 23 BC – AD 14) to Trajan (r. AD 98 – 117). Some of the artifacts from the site were on permanent exhibition in the Neath Museum, which has since closed with artefacts now in storage. The site is a Scheduled Ancient Monument.

Much of the site is in the grounds of Dwr-y-Felin Comprehensive School, where a 2011 dig found gate-towers of the earlier gateway, to the north-west of the ramparts of the reduced-sized fort shown on the map. Post-holes indicate that the towers extended out beyond the wall line, unique in Britain for its time, suggesting extreme defensive measures needed to be taken against the hostile Silures.

== Visible remains ==
After the 1949 and 1950 excavation of the two southern gateways the stonework was laid out for display. Two small enclosures now remain, surrounded by iron railings. One stands within the A474 roadside verge, whilst the eastern one occupies a corner of a housing estate, alongside the modern 'Roman Way'. It reveals the bases of the two gate-towers and a 'dual carriageway' between, Also shown is a section of the ditch that surrounded the ramparts, which would have been crossed by a timber bridge.

== See also ==
- List of Scheduled Monuments in Neath Port Talbot
