= Neath and Brecon Railway =

Transport company in United Kingdom

The Dulas Valley Mineral Railway was incorporated in 1862 to bring coal from the Onllwyn area north-east of Neath to the quays there, and in the following year was reconstituted as the Neath and Brecon Railway. The line was opened as far as Onllwyn in 1863.

The directors allowed a contractor John Dickson a free hand in building the line and when he became bankrupt the company was in a desperate financial situation. Nevertheless, the line was completed to Brecon in 1867, and an offshoot to connect with the Swansea Vale Railway, giving better access to Swansea, was ready in 1873.

The larger Midland Railway acquired rights over the line and ran a heavy mineral train service for many years, although the remote and difficult course of the line was expensive to operate. After the 1922 "Grouping" of the railways, a pooling agreement led to the diversion of the heavy traffic to routes that were easier to work over, and the line reverted to a quiet and remote rural line.

The passenger service was withdrawn in 1962 and present-day (2017) traffic is confined to uncertain mineral business from Onllwyn to Neath.

== Brecon Forest Tramroad ==
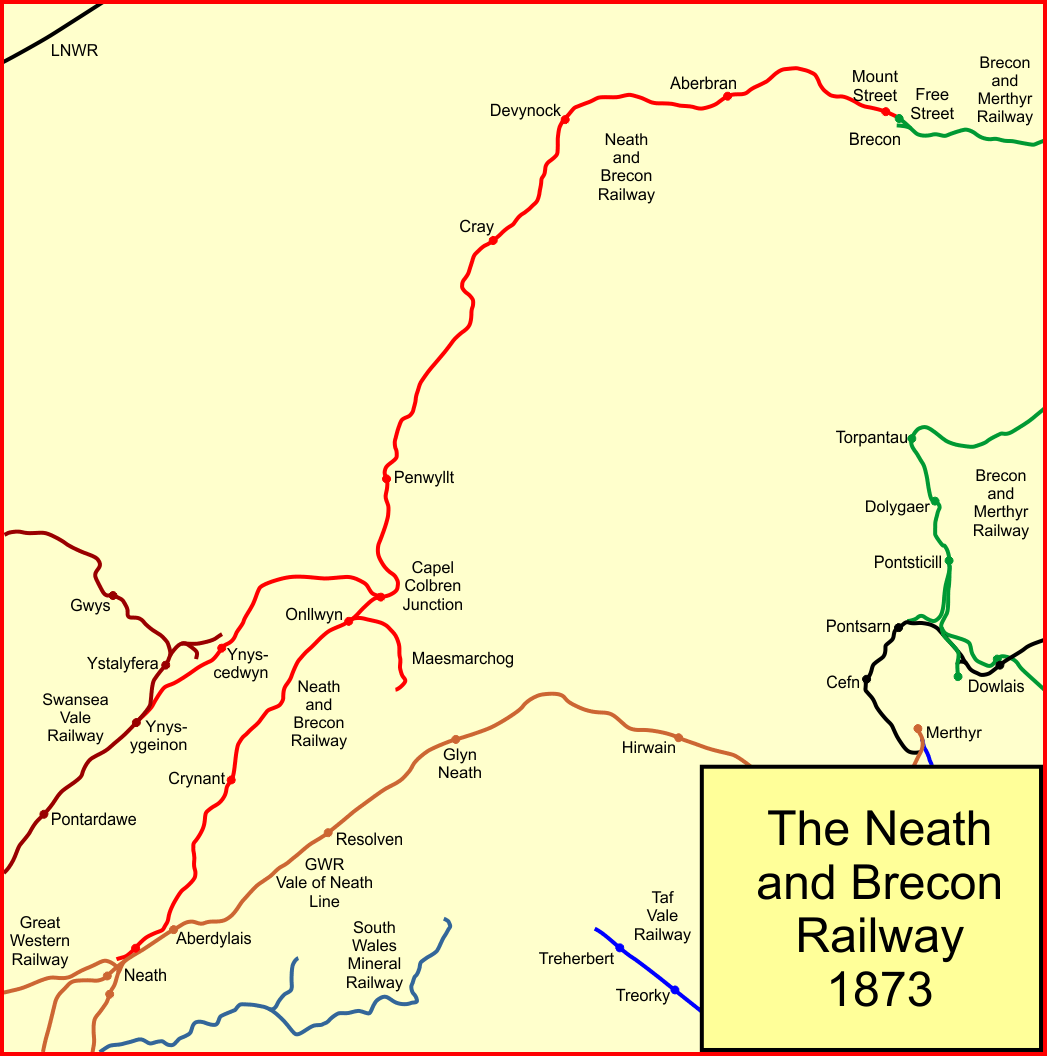
The Neath and Brecon Railway network

Brecon had long been a market and agricultural town, but its location within hilly terrain discouraged early communication routes.

In 1812 the Crown Estate sold 12,000 acres of forest land in Fforest Fawr to John Christie, an industrialist and entrepreneur. Christie thought that the band of limestone lying across the area was a commercial opportunity.

He needed a means of transport to move the heavy mineral to kilns for firing, and he determined to build what became the Brecon Forest Tramroad to do so. The original route was to lead from Fan Gyhirych, at an altitude of about 1,500 feet and descend to near present-day Sennybridge. However the long route over difficult terrain was discouraging, and in addition he needed to link in a source of coal for the firing process. A modified route was adopted, from quarries lower in the Tawe Valley at 1,267 feet; this involved hauling the limestone up for the first part of the journey to the pass known as Bwlch Bryn-rhudd.

This line was completed in 1824; it was a 3 ft 6 in (1,067 mm) gauge plateway. The economics of the business were imperfect: the limestone was hauled a considerable distance north-east, when the potential market for sales was in the south west. Moreover, access to coal reserves was also still difficult. He acquired the Drum (or Drim) Colliery late in 1822 and extended the tramroad down to the Swansea Canal at Gwaun-clawdd; he acquired a further colliery near there, as well as 24 canal barges.

These acquisitions over-extended Christie financially, and at the end of 1827 he became bankrupt.

A creditor named Joseph Claypon purchased the tramroad (through the Brecon Forest Tramroad Company) in 1831, and extended it to Gurnos and made other improvements. This extension was called Claypon's Tramroad Extension, or the Brecon Forest Branch Tramroad, and was ready in 1834.

== Hay Railway ==
The Hay Railway received approval in the Hay Railway Act 1811 (51 Geo. 3. c. cxxii) to build its line, in fact another 3 ft 6in gauge plateway, from Watton, on the Brecknock and Abergavenny Canal (later part of the in Brecon, to Hay and Eardisley). The Brecknock and Abergavenny Canal later became part of the Monmouthshire and Brecon Canal and Hay is now known as Hay-on-Wye. The line opened in 1816.

It continued an unexceptional business conveying rural merchandise, but by the beginning of the 1860s more modern railways were being considered at a time when the Hay Railway with its horse-drawn plateway wagons, was looking extremely obsolescent. The Hay Railway offered its line for sale, at a time when three railway companies were considering building on at least part of its route: the Mid Wales Railway, the Hereford, Hay and Brecon Railway and the Brecon and Merthyr Tydfil Junction Railway.

The three companies wanted to build their lines on the same ground for at least part of the way, and at length wasteful triplication was avoided, when they agreed to share out the Hay Railway and to build end-to-end. The Brecon and Merthyr Railway built its line from Talyllyn Junction to the Watton station at Brecon, opening in early 1863 from Pant on the northern margin of Merthyr.

By this time Neath had become heavily industrialised, and lay on the line of the South Wales Railway, opened there in 1850. The South Wales Railway was a broad gauge trunk line and was to connect the area in to the network of the Great Western Railway, with through trains to London.

A broad gauge ally of the South Wales Railway, the Vale of Neath Railway, ran from Neath over the watershed near Hirwain (now spelt Hirwaun) to Aberdare. Aberdare became the centre of a huge production of high quality coal. However the use of the broad gauge was a mixed blessing, and transits between Aberdare or Merthyr and Cardiff on that system via Neath involved a considerable excess mileage compared with rival, narrow (standard) gauge routes.

== Dulais Valley Mineral Railway ==
Meanwhile, in the 1830s coal and anthracite began to be extracted near Onllwyn, at the head of the Dulais Valley. A number of tramroads were constructed and anthracite was conveyed to the Swansea Canal. Iron was produced in the area, reducing the carrying of iron ore on the tramroad, but this local industry fluctuated wildly.

Dulas Valley Mineral Railway Act 1862
- Act of Parliament
- Parliament of the United Kingdom
- Long title: An Act to authorize the Construction of a Railway in the Counties of Glamorgan and Brecon, to be called "The Dulas Valley Mineral Railway," and for other Purposes.
- Citation: 25 & 26 Vict. c. cxciii

Dates
- Royal assent: 29 July 1862

Text of statute as originally enacted

Finally in 1861 a viable scheme was put forward, and the Dulas Valley Mineral Railway Act 1862 (25 & 26 Vict. c. cxciii) obtained royal assent on 29 July 1862 authorising the Dulas Valley Mineral Railway. (Note: Dulas instead of Dulais was no doubt the responsibility of the parliamentary draftsmen in London.) The estimated cost was £60,000. The purpose was to bring coal down from the Onllwyn area to the waterway at Neath, though some among the promoters saw this as part of a future through route from Swansea to Birmingham and Manchester. The line was to make a junction with the Vale of Neath Railway at Neath, and the VoNR was to lay a third rail to enable narrow (standard) gauge access.

At the first board meeting on 3 September 1862 a tender from John Dickson was accepted; he would build the line for £75,000 including all land acquisition and structures, as a single line of standard gauge, (Note: Jones, Dunstone and Watkins, page 20. The authors do not explain the rationale for this change; the company was still dependent on the broad gauge Vale of Neath.) but with space for later doubling; most importantly he would be responsible for raising the capital.

== The Neath and Brecon Railway ==
John Dickson became in effect the driving force of the Dulas Valley Mineral Railway, and he saw that the line would only reach its potential if it extended at each end. In the 1863 session of Parliament, therefore, the company promoted a Swansea and Neath and Brecon Railway. Swansea docks were as yet undeveloped but clearly had much greater potential than Neath. Extension north-eastward to Brecon would connect there with the Brecon and Merthyr Railway, itself connecting with a chain of other lines reaching to Hereford and beyond.

The Vale of Neath Railway was hostile to the extension to Swansea, and a mixed gauge Swansea and Neath Railway was in any case being promoted at the same time. The bill was accordingly pared down to omit the Swansea extremity, and the name of the proposed company changed to the Neath and Brecon Railway. At Brecon it was to make arrangements with the Brecon and Merthyr Railway to use its station, and corresponding terms were to be agreed somehow at Neath with the Vale of Neath Railway.

Neath and Brecon Railway Act 1863
- Act of Parliament
- Parliament of the United Kingdom
- Long title: An Act for the Amalgamation of the Swansea and Neath Railway Company with the Vale of Neath Railway Company, and for authorizing the Vale of Neath Railway Company to make a further Line of Railway, and to raise further Monies; and for other Purposes.
- Citation: 26 & 27 Vict. c. cxxx

Dates
- Royal assent: 13 July 1863

Text of statute as originally enacted

The bill was given royal assent on 13 July 1863 as the Neath and Brecon Railway Act 1863 (26 & 27 Vict. c. cxxx): the Neath and Brecon Railway was incorporated.

Neath and Brecon Railway Act 1864
- Act of Parliament
- Parliament of the United Kingdom
- Long title: An Act to enable the Neath and Brecon Railway Company to extend their Railway to the Central Wales Extension Railway and to construct a Branch to the Banwen and Maesmarchog Collieries; and for other Purposes.
- Citation: 27 & 28 Vict. c. cccxvi

Dates
- Royal assent: 29 July 1864

Text of statute as originally enacted

A further act, the Neath and Brecon Railway Act 1864 (27 & 28 Vict. c. cccxvi) was obtained the following year, authorising a line from Devynock to Llangammarch Wells on the (as yet unbuilt) Central Wales Extension Railway. The London and North Western Railway (LNWR) was sponsoring the chain of railways that became the Central Wales Line, but it was asserted that the Devynock line would give the LNWR a more convenient entry to Swansea. The act was passed on 29 July 1864, and also authorised a branch from Onllwyn to a colliery at Maes-y-marchog.

Some work was done on the Llangammarch line, but it was overtaken by the financial crisis following the collapse of the banking house of Overend, Gurney and Company in May 1866; work was suspended, and by the time finance became available once again, the Llangammarch line was no longer a priority. This work is visible on Google Earth up the Cilieni valley right up to the watershed just south of Tirabad. No work is visible between there and Llangammarch Wells.

== Opening ==
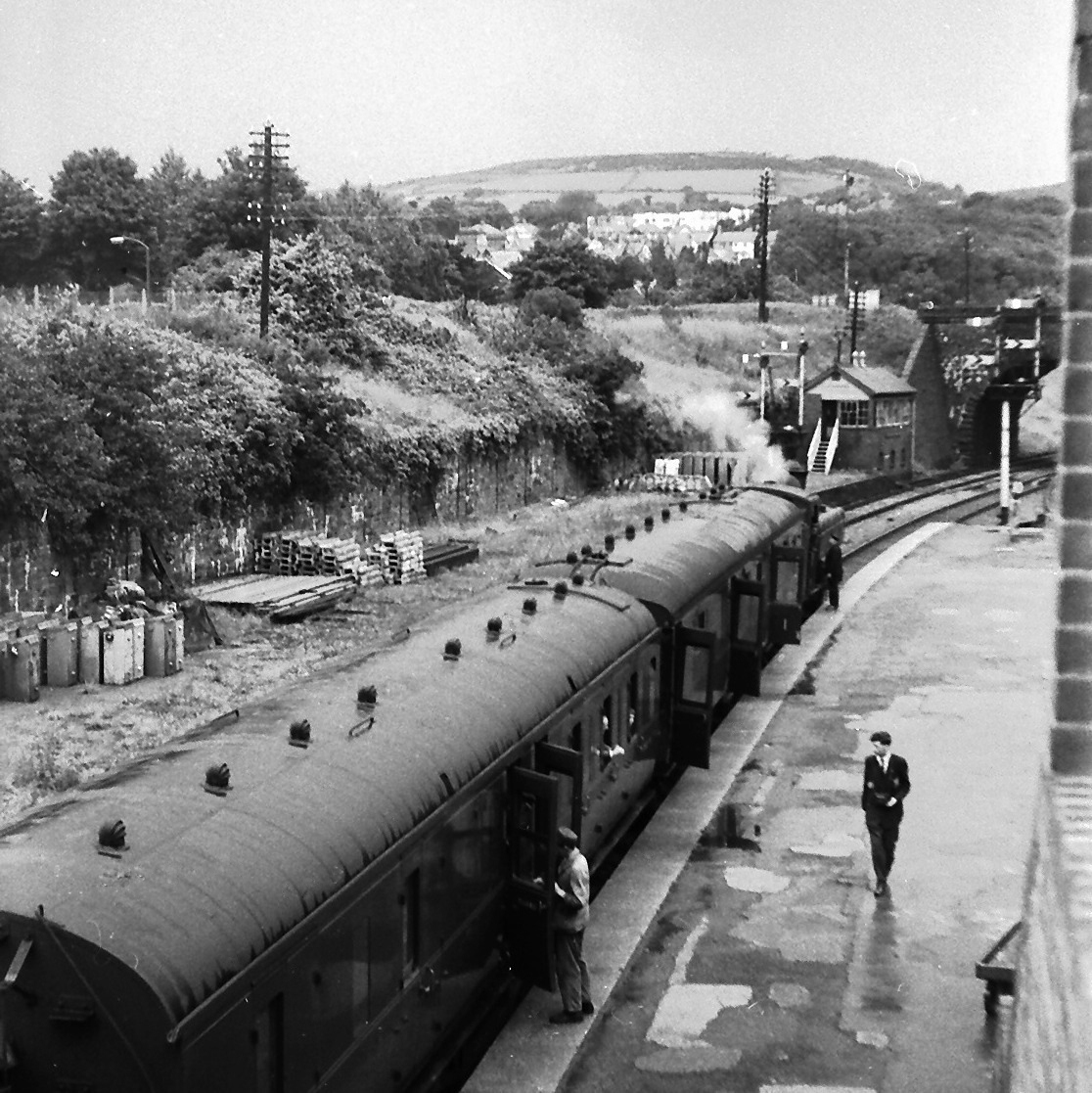
A Brecon train prepares for departure from Neath Riverside on 14 July 1962, a few months before closure. The South Wales main line crosses on the overbridge in the distance

The line was opened as far as Onllwyn on 2 October 1864. Goods traffic started to run to Brecon on 13 September 1866, and a free passenger train service was run; Board of Trade authorisation for passenger operation had not yet been received. Authorised passenger train operation started on 3 June 1867. This was to a temporary N&BR station at Mount Street in Brecon; there was lengthy and fractious argument over forming a common station there with the Brecon and Merthyr Railway, whose station was only seven chains away and on a practicable alignment.

== The Junction Line ==
Swansea Vale and Neath and Brecon Junction Railway Act 1864
- Act of Parliament
- Parliament of the United Kingdom
- Long title: An Act to authorize the Construction of a Railway to connect the Swansea Vale and Neath and Brecon Railways.
- Citation: 27 & 28 Vict. c. ccxciii

Dates
- Royal assent: 29 July 1864

Text of statute as originally enacted

Entry to Neath was all very well, having been chosen because of the convenience of simply building down from Onllwyn to Neath in the Dulais Valley. Swansea, however, was a much more attractive destination, and the N&BR set about thinking how that place might be reached. The Swansea Vale Railway had been opened in stages down to 1861; it ran from Swansea to Ystalyfera, and was not far to the west of the N&BR line. The decision was taken to build a connecting line, and this became the Swansea Vale and Neath and Brecon Junction Railway. It was incorporated by the Swansea Vale and Neath and Brecon Junction Railway Act 1864 (27 & 28 Vict. c. ccxciii) on 29 July to run from Colbren, a little north of Onllwyn, to a junction with the Swansea Vale Railway at Ynysygeinon. This railway became known as "the Junction line".

Swansea Vale and Neath and Brecon Junction Railway (Lease) Act 1866
- Act of Parliament
- Parliament of the United Kingdom
- Long title: An Act authorising a Lease of the Swansea Vale and Neath and Brecon Junction Railway to the Neath and Brecon Railway Company.
- Citation: 29 & 30 Vict. c. ccxii

Dates
- Royal assent: 16 July 1866

Other legislation
- Repealed by: Neath and Brecon Railway (Amalgamation and Arrangement) Act 1869

Status: Repealed

Text of statute as originally enacted

Under the Swansea Vale and Neath and Brecon Junction Railway (Lease) Act 1866 (29 & 30 Vict. c. ccxii) was to be leased for 999 years by the Neath and Brecon from 1 January 1867, by which date it was assumed that construction would have been completed. In fact this was not the case, and it was amalgamated with the N&BR from 26 July 1869.

== Financial difficulties ==
Neath and Brecon Railway (Additional Powers) Act 1867
- Act of Parliament
- Parliament of the United Kingdom
- Long title: An Act to authorize the Neath and Brecon Railway Company to acquire certain Lands at and near Swansea; to transfer to the Company the Oystermouth Tramway and Part of the Brecon Forest Tramway; and to confer other Powers on the Company.
- Citation: 30 & 31 Vict. c. cxxii

Dates
- Royal assent: 15 July 1867

Other legislation
- Repealed by: Neath and Brecon Railway (Amalgamation and Arrangement) Act 1869

Status: Repealed

Text of statute as originally enacted

In the summer of 1866 the financial position of the company was becoming serious. Application was made to Parliament for increased capital. This was approved by the Neath and Brecon Railway (Additional Powers) Act 1867 (30 & 31 Vict. c. cxxii). Meanwhile, the contractor for construction submitted a series of requests for additional funds.

There was considerable impropriety in John Dickson's handling of the affairs of the company, which he had been given exceptional licence to manage without much supervision. Heavily discounted shares and debentures were transferred to him, as well as surplus land. Moreover, major liabilities of the company were indemnified by him personally. In September 1867 Dickson became bankrupt, heavily indebted to the Neath and Brecon Railway, and the company itself was now in serious trouble.

Neath and Brecon Railway (Amalgamation and Arrangement) Act 1869
- Act of Parliament
- Parliament of the United Kingdom
- Long title: An Act for vesting the undertaking of the Swansea Vale and Neath and Brecon Junction Railway Company in the Neath and Brecon Railway Company; for suspending legal proceedings against the Neath and Brecon Railway Company; for converting the mortgage and other debts into debenture stock; for raising money, and regulating the capital of that Company; and for other purposes.
- Citation: 32 & 33 Vict. c. cxlv

Dates
- Royal assent: 26 July 1869

Text of statute as originally enacted

The difficulties multiplied as directors' personal involvement and commitments were disclosed, but the creditors were interested in retrieving something from the mess, and after considerable negotiation an agreement was reached, ratified as the Neath and Brecon Railway (Amalgamation and Arrangement) Act 1869 (32 & 33 Vict. c. cxlv). This authorised the conversion of debts into 6% debentures and extinguished nearly all other claims against the company. The 1867 act granting additional capital was repealed, and the authorised capital was now £1,280,000. The line was said to have really cost £300,000 in cash.

The 1869 act also authorised the acquisition of the unbuilt Swansea Vale and Neath and Brecon Junction Railway (the Junction Line). Mutual running powers for the N&BR over the Swansea Vale to Swansea, and for the SVR to Brecon, were included in the deal. The Junction line opened for traffic on 10 November 1873.

== Swansea Vale and Neath and Brecon Junction Railway ==
In 1864 the Swansea Vale and Neath and Brecon Junction Railway had been authorised by the Swansea Vale and Neath and Brecon Junction Railway Act 1864 (27 & 28 Vict. c. ccxciii), to build a line from Colbren Junction on the N&BR to Ynysygeinon, where it was to form an end-on junction with the Swansea Vale Railway.

The line took a considerable time to complete; it was inspected by the Board of Trade inspecting officer on 4 September 1873, but he refused permission to open for passenger traffic. In fact it opened on 1 October 1873, and the Neath and Brecon was able to work four trains a day between Swansea and Brecon. The Swansea Vale Railway began running its own trains to Brecon from 1 February 1874.

== Midland Railway ==
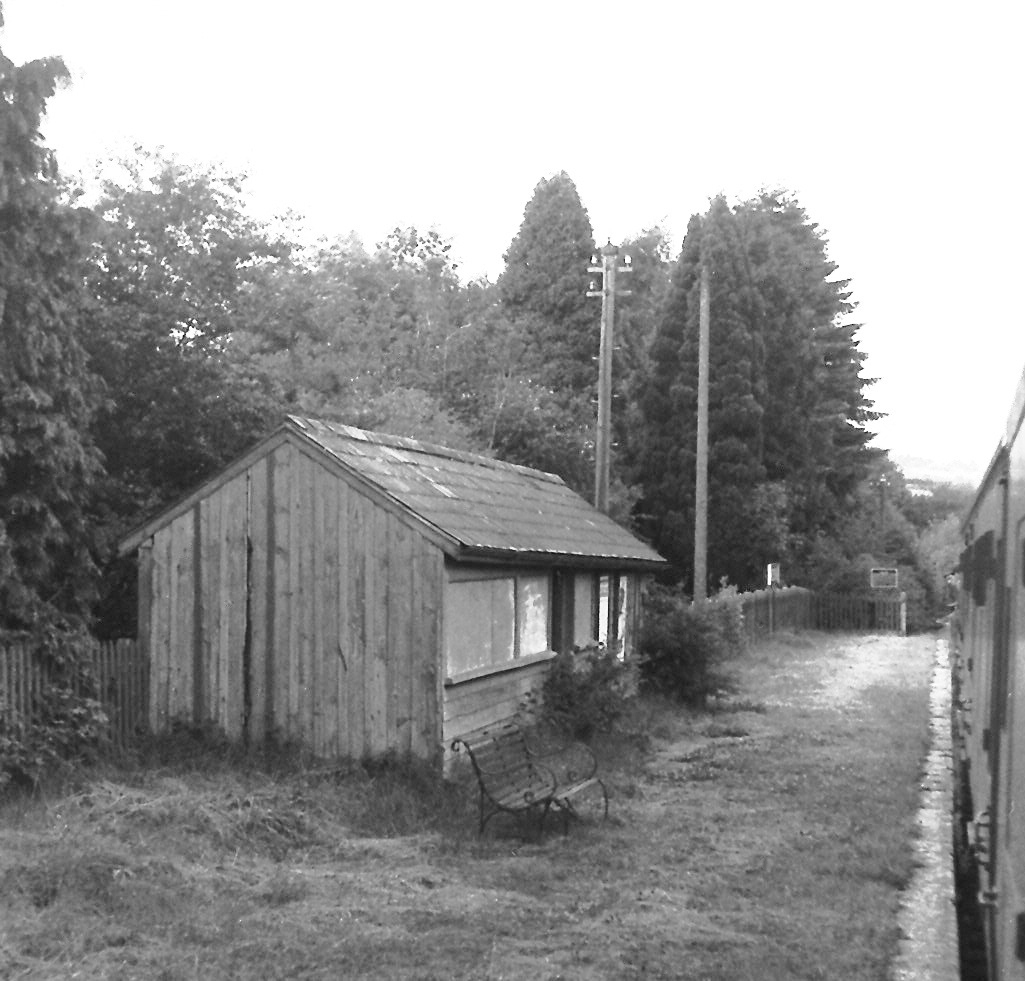
Aberbran halt

The Midland Railway had reached Brecon by arrangement with the Hereford, Hay and Brecon Railway and now on 1 September 1874 it leased the Swansea Vale Railway. The Swansea Vale Railway had running powers over the N&BR so the Midland Railway now indicated that it intended to run through trains over the N&BR. In fact the Midland Railway offered to operate all trains north of Colbren Junction for one third of receipts, about £4,000 annually. The N&BR reluctantly accepted this arrangement from 1 July 1877 for five years, and the N&BR only operated trains between Colbren Junction and Neath.

The arrangement was renewed until in 1889 the N&BR tried to negotiate better terms, at which the Midland Railway abruptly discontinued the through trains on 1 July 1889. For several days there was no service whatever on the worked section of line. On 6 July 1889 the N&BR started working a skeleton train service itself, with borrowed rolling stock from the Manchester, Sheffield and Lincolnshire Railway; Sir Edward Watkin was chairman of both companies. Following arbitration the Midland Railway resumed working the trains from 22 July 1889.

== Adelina Patti ==
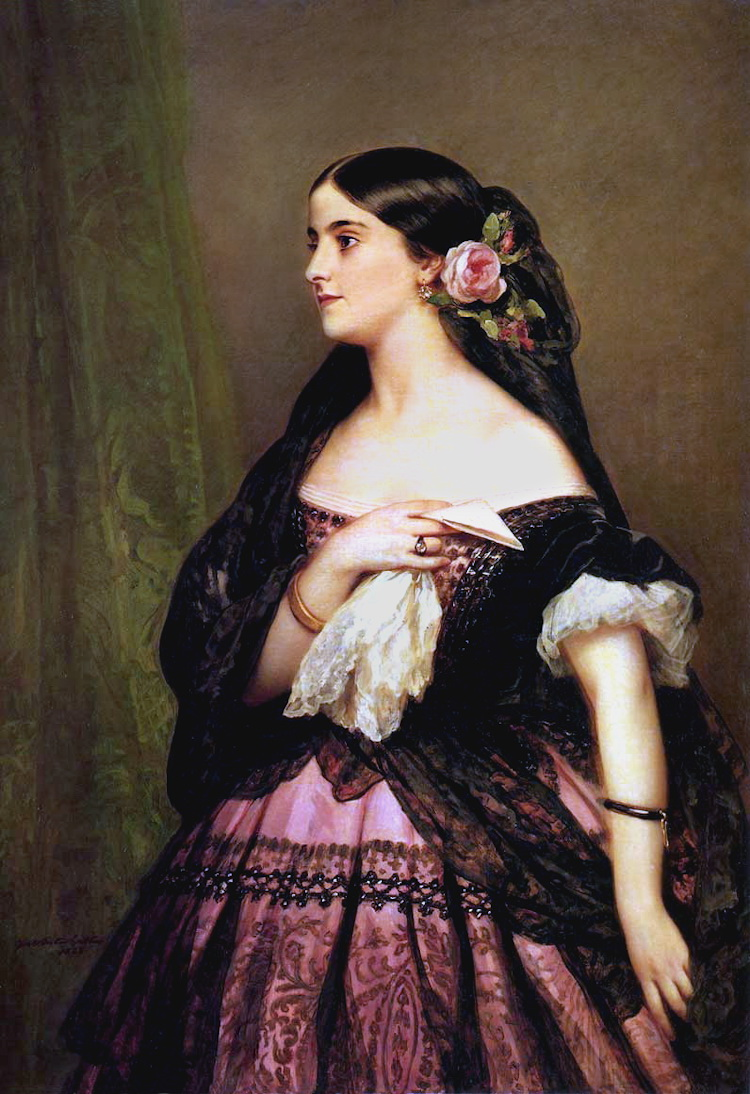
Adelina Patti in 1863

Adelina Patti was a famous and acclaimed opera singer; she first sang in public as a child in 1851 and her career lasted until 1914. She earned huge fees and appeared internationally.

She acquired Craig-y-nos, described as a castle, and lived there between 1878 and 1919. The nearest station was Cray but the road to it was extremely poor. Having good connections she asked the Midland Railway to provide a platform at Bwlch, which was only a crossing loop, but in time she had a private waiting room erected at Penwyllt, and she paid personally for furnishing it and providing a road to it from Craig-y-nos. She habitually travelled in a private saloon, and many highly placed people visited her at Craig-y-nos. Her costumes and personal attendants were accommodated with her in her saloon during her own travels.

Her celebrity was such that the GWR publicity department was able to use her name to advertise the Severn Tunnel, newly opened to passengers, when she was returning from London to Craig-y-nos:

Madame Patti has practically opened the Severn Tunnel… It is true that very few people knew it, and perhaps Madame Patti herself did not know it, but everybody will be talking about it to everybody else. The facts are these. On Sunday Madame Patti and party—a large one—wanted to get from London to Neath with comfort and speed. A special train was arranged for, and the great songstress paid for it out of her own pocket, or wherever she keeps the great piles of money she has made. Many people will be interested to know that the special train ran along the new route through the Severn Tunnel, and that the whole distance from Paddington to Neath was comfortably traversed in four hours and twelve minutes. This was the first through train from London to South Wales via Bristol and the Severn Tunnel, and Madame Patti chartered it, rode in it, and paid for it, and therefore she has the honour of having opened the Severn Tunnel route to London.

After this part of the line was closed in 1962, it was re-opened on 1 July 1964 for the traffic of Hobbs (Quarries) Limited, and that company acquired the station buildings at Craig-y-nos station, which had fallen in to disrepair. The new owners restored the station are to its original state:

The station building itself has been converted into a lodge with all-electric cooking and other facilities, and the waiting room restored, and, so far as was possible, equipped with furniture appropriate to the period, Theatre handbills and murals relating to the great singer, who died at her house, Craig-y-Nos Castle, on September 27, 1919, are exhibited on the walls, and no effort has been spared to recapture the original atmosphere, upholstery and curtains being in pink and white with red carpeting.

== Improved finances ==
From about 1890 the financial situation of the company improved, and it was possible to purchase further locomotives and rolling stock. This enabled the company to take over the working of its own coal trains on the Junction Line between Colbren and Ynysygeinon after 1 July 1903.

== After 1923 ==
In 1922 the Neath and Brecon Railway was absorbed into the new Great Western Railway (GWR), (Note: The "old" Great Western Railway was of course the largest constituent of the new GWR.) one of four large companies established by the government as part of the process known as the "grouping", following the Railways Act 1921.

The effective date of the absorption was 1 July 1922. The issued capital of the company was £1.67 million and the net income (Note: Probably net operating profit; financing charges would have had to be paid out of that, and possibly provision for future major capital expenditure planned, before any shareholders' distribution could be considered.) in 1921 was £43,159, and no dividend had been paid on ordinary shares in that year.

The company owned 15 locomotives, 42 passenger carriages, 133 freight wagons, and had 327 employees.

In time the change led to a reduction in some wasteful duplication. The Midland Railway had been amalgamated into the London, Midland and Scottish Railway (LMS) group in January 1923 and the new company reviewed the value of its train services to Swansea. The Junction Line to Swansea had been regarded as the main line, and Neath the branch, but from 1 January 1931 passenger trains from Brecon were diverted exclusively to Neath, and the Junction line became a branch with a residual service (operated by the GWR) from Colbren Junction to Ystradgynlais only; the LMS through trains from Swansea to Brecon being withdrawn. Incidentally this thinning of the train service enabled the closure of the remote crossing loop at Bwlch. The residual passenger service over the Junction line was itself withdrawn from 12 September 1932 and thereafter the Junction line was used only for goods and mineral traffic, serving as it did the International Colliery at Abercrave.

General traffic over the entire length of the line was rather limited from that time onwards, but anthracite production in the Onllwyn area continued to provide a steady flow of traffic to Swansea, nine return mineral train trips a day being recorded in 1938.

After 1948, when the GWR and LMS were taken into national ownership, the residual passenger use on the line fell considerably, to the extent that in the winter of 1958 the service between Colbren Junction and Brecon was reduced to just one afternoon train each way per day on Mondays to Fridays, with a second, morning service on Saturdays only (there had never been a regular service of passenger trains on Sundays at any time). Additional passenger services were operated between Neath and Colbren, largely for benefit of miners and other workmen, but generally speaking the sparse service attracted few passengers and was withdrawn completely on and from 15 October 1962, the last trains running on Saturday 13 October. (Note: Jones et al say on page 161 that "A service between Neath and Onllwyn continued until 15 June 1964, but this is contradicted by Quick, and also by the Railway Magazine, November 1962, page 798, "Neath and Brecon Service withdrawn". "The passenger train service between Neath Riverside and Brecon was withdrawn by the Western Region on and from October 15, and the following stations and halts closed for passengers: … Onllwyn… The last train [was] on Saturday, October 13.") As was becoming common, the last trains attracted a number of enthusiasts and other travellers keen to make a final journey over the line, to the extent that additional carriages had to be provided to accommodate all those who wished to travel. The morning and afternoon departures from Neath were strengthened from two to five coaches and both trains were double-headed by ex-GWR 5700-class pannier tank locomotives, the staple motive power on the passenger service for many years.

The Junction Line was closed completely on 3 November 1969.

By 1970 it was the coal washery at Onllwyn that sustained that portion of the line, but between 1970 and 1977 there was some limestone traffic from the quarries at Penwyllt (Craig-y-nos).

Since that date sporadic and extremely irregular mineral traffic from Onllwyn has run. Celtic Energy used the site as a coal washing plant until August 2022. The site is being redeveloped as the Global Centre of Rail Excellence.

== Topography ==
=== Gradients ===
The gradient profile on the line had a summit in the centre, at Bwlch, 1,267 feet above sea level.

From Brecon the line undulated as far as Aberbran, but then climbed almost continuously, steepening to 1-in-52 and 1-in-65. The descent to Neath was continuous, typically at 1-in-50 and 1-in-60.

The junction line descended from Colbren to Ynysyygeinon, also at 1-in-55 and 1-in-50.

=== Stations ===
When the line opened the stations were at Neath, Crynant, Onllwyn, Penwyllt, Devynock and Brecon. The Neath station was at Cadoxton, as Neath Low Level SVR station was not used by the B&NR until 3 June 1867.

Neath Low Level continued to be used by N&BR line passenger trains until they ceased in 1962.

=== Station list ===
- Neath Riverside; GWR station; used by N&BR trains from 3 June 1867; N&BR ceased to use this station and moved to Neath Cadoxton 1 August 1878; resumed use of Neath Riverside 1 August 1889; closed 15 October 1962 except school trains ran until 15 June 1964
- Neath Cadoxton; opened 1 August 1878; closed 1 August 1889
- Cadoxton Terrace Halt; opened by GWR 18 March 1929; closed 15 October 1962;
- Penscynor Halt; opened by GWR 1 August 1929; closed 15 October 1962;
- Cilfrew; open from September 1888; closed 15 October 1962;
- Cefn Coed Colliery; opened 8 September 1930; closed 15 October 1962;
- Crynant; opened 3 June 1867; closed 15 October 1962;
- Crynant Colliery; miners' platform; dates uncertain;
- Crynant New Colliery Halt; dates uncertain but at least 1938 to 1954;
- Dillwyn; & Brynteg; miners' halt; opened by September 1928; closed 15 October 1962;
- Brynteg Colliery & Nantycefn Halt; miners' platform; dates uncertain, in use 1930;
- Seven Sisters; opened June 1876; closed 15 October 1962;
- Pantyffordd Halt; opened by GWR 2 September 1929; closed 15 October 1962;
- Onllwyn; opened 3 June 1867; closed 15 October 1962;
- Capel Colbren Junction; opened 10 November 1873; renamed Colbren Junction 1874; closed 15 October 1962;
- Penwyllt; opened 3 June 1867; renamed Craig-y-Nos Penwyllt 1907; closed 15 October 1962;
- Cray; opened February 1870; closed 15 October 1962;
- Devynock; opened 3 June 1867; renamed Devynock & Sennybridge 1913; closed 15 October 1962;
- Abercamlais; private station; opened 3 June 1867; closed 15 October 1962;
- Penpont Halt; private station; opened by February 1930; closed 15 October 1962;
- Aberbran; opened 14 September 1868; closed 15 October 1962;
- Cradoc; opened 1 March 1877; closed 15 October 1962;
- Brecon Mount Street; opened 3 June 1867; closed 1874;
- Brecon Free Street; Brecon and Merthyr Railway station; closed 15 October 1962.

=== Junction line ===
- Ynysygeinon Junction; Swansea Vale station; opened 21 January 1861; closed February 1862;
- Yniscedwyn; opened 10 November 1873; renamed Ystradgynlais 1893; closed 12 September 1932;
- Abercrave; opened 2 March 1891; closed 12 September 1932;
- Colbren; above.

== Locomotives ==
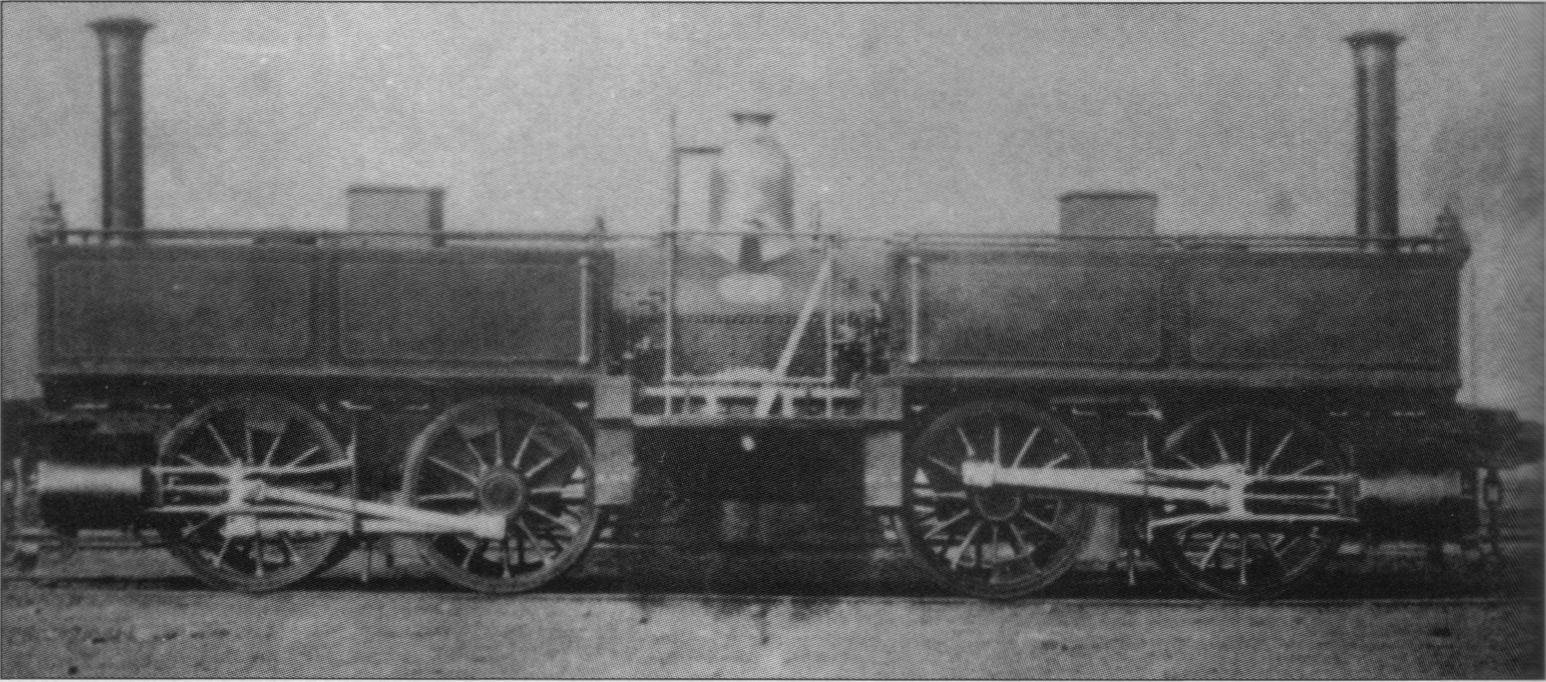
Fairlie locomotive Mountaineer, built in 1866

While Dickson was the contractor for operating the line, he obtained a Fairlie Patent locomotive named "Progress". However its performance was poor, and in 1868 the locomotive was put off hire. Dickson procured a second Fairlie locomotive named Mountaineer in 1866, but this too was unsuccessful.

Dickson obtained two 2-4-0 tender engines for the passenger service. These had been built for the Somerset and Dorset Railway but that contract was cancelled. After the Midland Railway took over the main line operation in 1877 they did little work and were cut up in 1884.

=== Locomotive fleet of the Neath and Brecon Railway ===
N&BR no.	GWR no.	Builder	Type	Date built	Date scrapped
1	2199	Avonside Engine Company	0-6-0ST	1872	1931
2	2189	Avonside Engine Company	0-6-0ST	1872	1931
3	1882	GWR Swindon	0-6-0ST converted to 0-6-0PT	1890	1946
5	1392	Yorkshire Engine Co	4-4-0T	1871	1926
6	1400	Sharp, Stewart	2-4-0T	1892	1926
7	2174	Nasmyth Wilson & Co	0-6-0ST	1899	1927
8	2175	Nasmyth Wilson & Co	0-6-0ST	1899	1933
9	1327	Robert Stephenson & Co.	0-6-2T	1903	1929
10	1371	Robert Stephenson & Co.	0-6-2T	1903	1930; rebuilt with taper boiler
11	1114	Robert Stephenson & Co.	0-6-2T	1906	1930
12	1327	Robert Stephenson & Co.	0-6-2T	1906	1930
13	1277	Robert Stephenson & Co.	0-6-2T	1906	1929
14	1563	GWR; bought 1911	0-6-0T	1878	1931
15	1591	GWR; bought 1911	0-6-0ST	1879	1922
16	1715	GWR; bought 1914	0-6-0PT	1891	1949

== Remaining features in the landscape ==
Traces remain along much of the route but the superstructure of the girder bridge at Devynock has been removed.

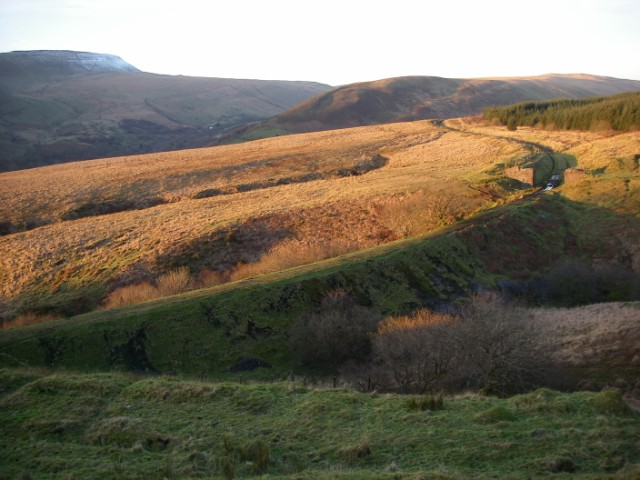

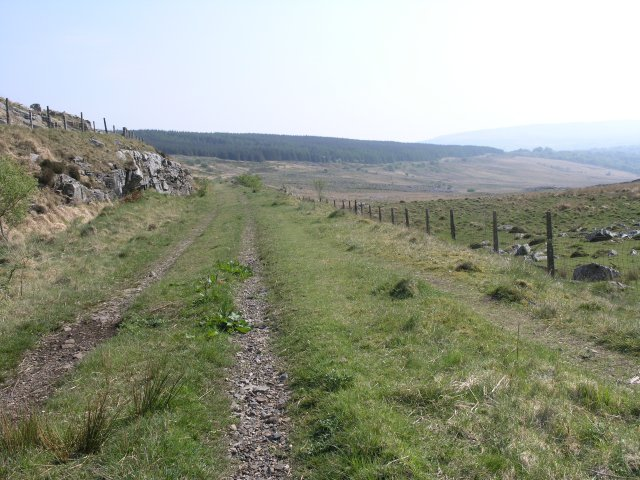

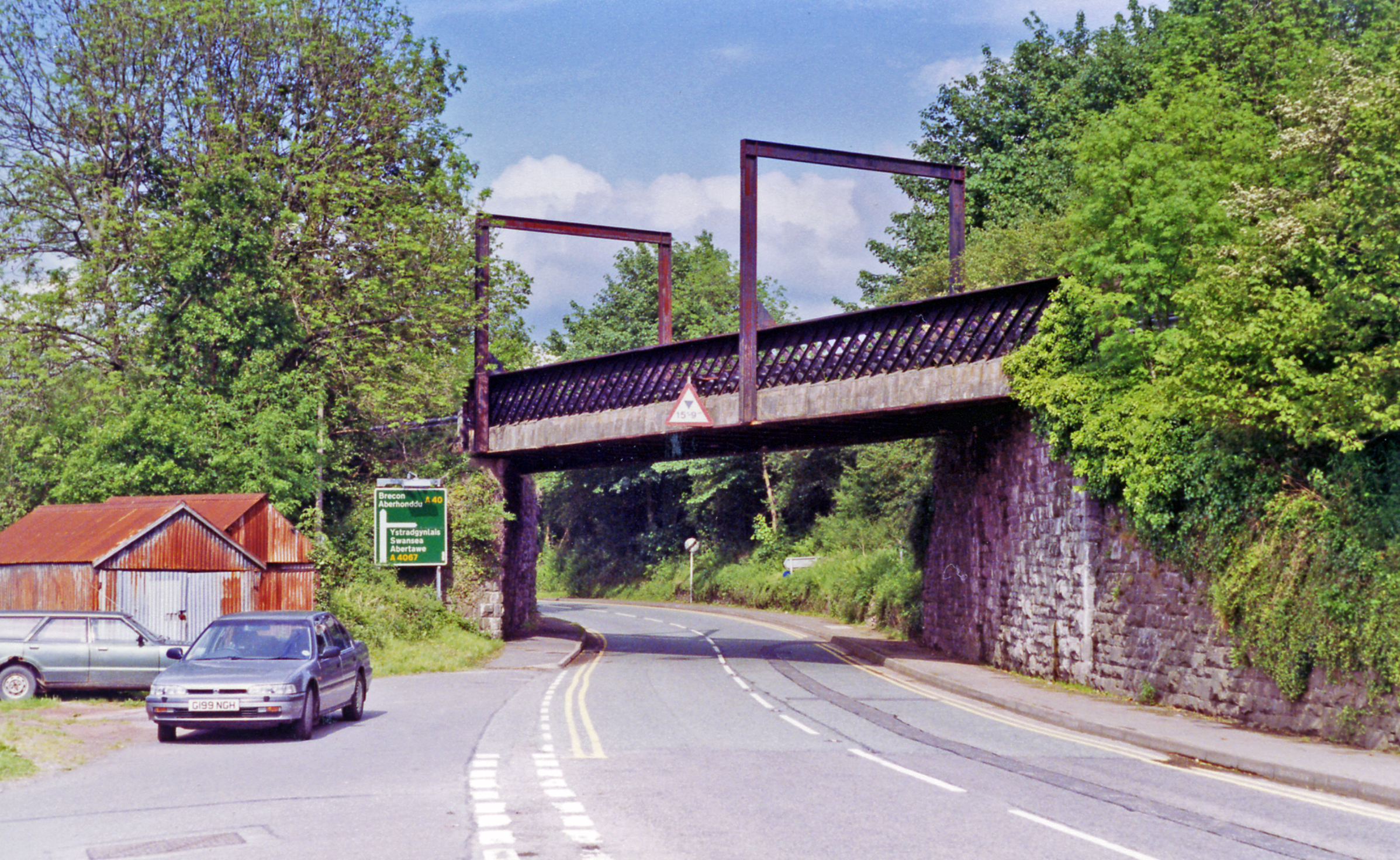

== See also ==
- Cefn Coed Colliery Museum
- The Stephenson locomotives of the N&BR
