= Dulais Valley =

Valley in southern Wales

Coordinates: 51.73628°N 3.75029°W

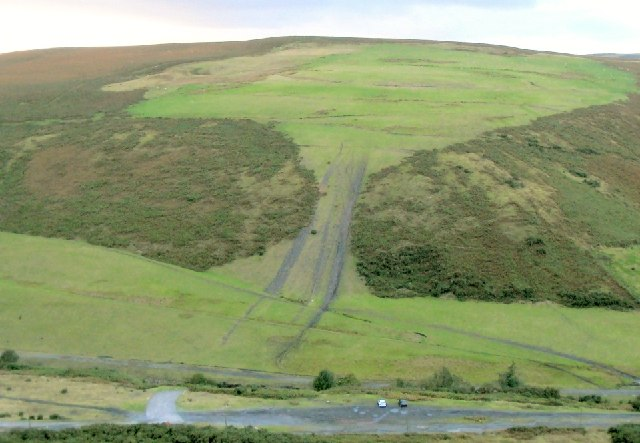

The Dulais Valley, one of the South Wales Valleys, is traversed by the River Dulais in southwest Wales north of the town of Neath, Wales.

Settlements in the valley include Crynant, Seven Sisters, Banwen, and Dyffryn Cellwen, which are served by the A4109 road through the valley.

The towns in the valley developed from the coal mining industry.

Visitor attractions in the valley include the Cefn Coed Colliery Museum.

The valley is the main location of the 2014 BBC film Pride.
