= Banwen =

Village in South Wales

Coordinates: 51.7724°N 3.6608°W

- Location within Neath Port Talbot
- OS grid reference: SN855095
- Principal area: Neath Port Talbot
- Preserved county: West Glamorgan
- Country: Wales
- Sovereign state: United Kingdom
- Post town: NEATH
- Postcode district: SA10
- Dialling code: 01639
- Police: South Wales
- Fire: Mid and West Wales
- Ambulance: Welsh
- UK Parliament: Neath and Swansea East.

Banwen is a small village in Neath Port Talbot county borough (NPT) in Wales. Banwen is part of the community of Onllwyn along with the village of Onllwyn itself and the adjacent parish of Dyffryn Cellwen. Banwen is in the Upper Dulais Valley, with views over the southern slopes of the Brecon Beacons (Welsh: Bannau Brycheiniog). Banwen consists of a single street named Roman Road.

== Toponymy ==
The name Banwen derives from Ban (meaning "height" or "summit") and Wen (meaning "blessed" or "white"). The name occurs frequently throughout the area, (as the name of a class of fields in Brynlloi, an open common Brynamman and a farm Cwmgrenig) suggesting an ancient continuity.

== History ==
=== Roman period ===
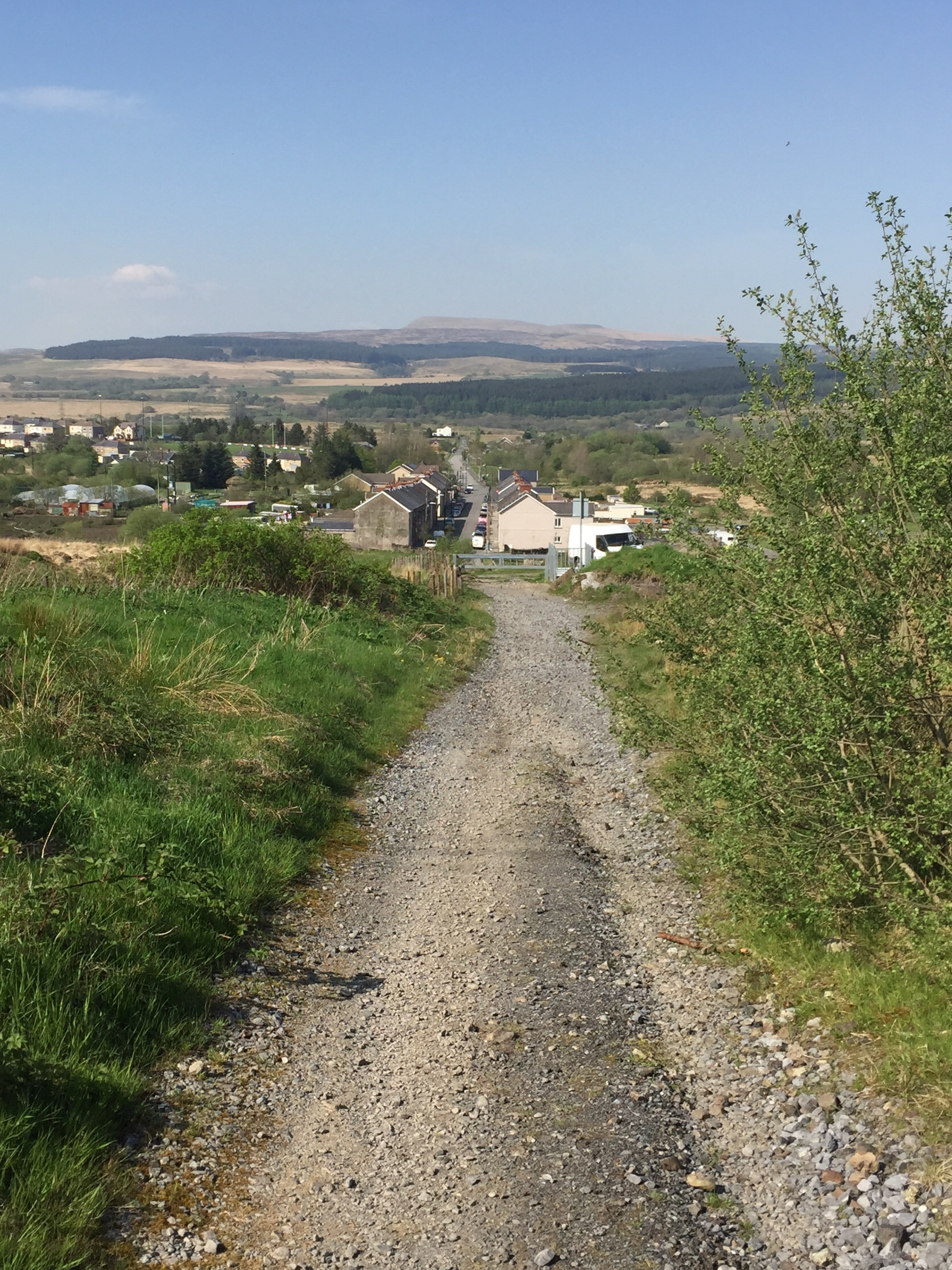
Sarn Helen Roman Road above Banwen

Map of the area around Banwen, South Wales, showing the Roman roads and earthworks close to the border between Neath Port Talbot and Powys.

Although coal would dominate the local area in later years, the ancient era saw significant copper, iron and tin extraction around the Banwen area. Following the Roman invasion of Wales, a road was constructed from Nidum (the fort at Neath) to Brecon in the 70s AD. As part of the construction, two fortified structures were built where the road made a shift in direction, just north of Banwen. The Neath-Brecon Roman road (designated RR622 by RCAHMW) is one of various Roman roads in Wales traditionally known as the Sarn Helen. The earliest structure beside the road was the large banked enclosure of a Roman marching camp, built around 74 AD as a temporary military camp.

Two-hundred metres (yards) north-west of the camp, a smaller, square fort was built, with earth ramparts and timber construction throughout. It was positioned such that the road to Neath exited through the southern gateway, and that to Brecon left through the eastern gate. Air photographs indicate the possibility that roads also left through the other two gates. This was in use as a fort of the Roman Auxiliary Army for around 70 years, providing defensible accommodation some 18 kilometres (11 miles) from Nidum (Neath). It is not known what name the Romans gave the fort, however upon excavating the earthworks in 1904-5, Col. W.Ll. Morgan R.E. named it 'Coelbren Fort' after Coelbren, Powys, 1.25 kilometres (0.78 miles) to the north-west. Both the Marching Camp and Fort are scheduled monuments, as is the stretch of Roman road running east from the fort, giving them legal protection against disturbance.

=== Saint Patrick ===
The village is notable for the tradition that it was the birthplace of Saint Patrick. This is supported by the writings most widely attributed to him, The Confession of St, Patrick, in which the saint gives his birthplace as Banavem Taburniae or Banna Venta Berniae on the west coast of Britain. Both names are possible Latin cognates for the Celtic name Banwen.

Eoin MacNeill argued that this was more likely than other purported birth places in Northern Britannia, as "The western coasts of southern Scotland and northern England held little to interest a (Irish) raider seeking quick access to booty and numerous slaves, while the southern coast of Wales offered both. In addition, the region was home to Uí Liatháin and possibly also Déisi settlers during this time". MacNeill also stated the etymology of the village made it the prime contender, but acknowledged the possibility of a transcription error. Banwen was also stated to be Patrick's probable place of birth in Life of St. Patrick and His Place in History by Professor J. B. Bury.

The tradition is often given with another tradition that Patrick studied at Llantwit Major before the eponymous St Illtud established his college. An annual service is held on the Saint's day at the Maen Padrig Sant (St Patrick's Stone), a memorial stone raised in 2004 alongside the Sarn Helen.

== Sport and leisure ==
Banwen is home to rugby union club Banwen RFC formed in 1947.

Stages of the Wales Rally GB are held at Walters Arena.

The Banwen Miners Hunt was founded in the village in 1962 following the demise of the West Glamorgan hunt. In the early days of the Hunt, the Duchess of Beaufort rode amongst the Banwen Miners.

== Media ==
Roman Road in Banwen is featured prominently as a location in The Strike, filmed in 1987 for the Channel 4 series The Comic Strip Presents... and broadcast in January 1988. In 2014 the film Pride was set and filmed in Banwen and neighbouring Onllwyn.

On 30 August 2020, Banwen was in the news after reports of an illegal rave which attracted 3,000 people took place during the COVID-19 pandemic.
