= Aberpergwm =

Colliery in south Wales, Britain

Coordinates: 51°45′04″N 3°39′50″W

Aberpergwm is the site of a colliery in the Vale of Neath near Glynneath in south Wales.

== Mine history ==
The site at Aberpergwm had been worked since 1811 as a series of drift mines, but full commercial working began from the 1860s when W. Williams opened a mine on the site. The mine was consolidated with the nearby Pwllfaron drift mine from 1880 with common ground works, under one owner Morgan Stuart Williams. A new drift was opened in 1906, giving the combined colliery access to the Eighteen Feet, Four-Feet, Nine-Feet, Three-Feet and Cornish seams. In 1920 the colliery was bought by Vale of Neath Collieries Co., which itself was consolidated into Amalgamated Anthracite Collieries Ltd in 1929. After World War 2 the mines were nationalised, and under British Coal in 1950 the various drift mine workings employed 855 working the Eighteen Feet, Nine Feet and Three Feet seams. By 1969 the mines faced severe geological problems. As a result, only the White Four Feet and Cornish seams were worked. It was also decided as a possible final act to work the pillars left within the Victorian workings of the Eighteen Feet seam. A £750,000 investment in the early 1970s led to extraction from the Pentreclwylla Fault, but the National Coal Board closed Aberpergwm on 7 October 1985.

== Present day ==
The drift mine was reopened in 1996 by local investors Anthracite Mining Ltd, with the mine estimated to have recoverable reserves of 7.6 million tonnes of high-grade anthracite. Bought out by UK-based Energybuild, in 2011 Energybuild was bought by Walter Energy of the United States. At this time, most of the coal was delivered to Port Talbot Steelworks owned by Tata Steel. The colliery suspended working the multi-entry system in the 18 ft seam and concentrated on the development of the 9 ft.

In July 2015, after the bankruptcy filing by Walter Energy, the mine ceased production and was placed on a "care and maintenance" basis. After three years of closure, in 2018 Energybuild was bought from the administrators by another group of UK investors.

As of 2026, Aberpergwm is the only producer of high-grade anthracite in Western Europe, creating a high-carbon coal which creates a clean burn with low emissions, low sulphur, and high efficiency. Most of the output is finely crushed to produce a carbon product suitable for use in carbon filtering. Since the closure of the Port Talbot Steelworks blast furnaces in 2024, the mine has diversified, using the high purity of coal, into green economy related supply chains, such as battery manufacturing and carbon electrodes.

Energybuild has planning permission, valid to December 2039, for an underground extension of 1,131 hectares (2,790 acres).

== Other ==
The ruined, derelict Aberpergwm House stands on the grounds, the former seat of the Williams family of Aberpergwm.

The Healthcare Property Company Wales built a two-storey healthcare centre, which opened in 2019, on the site of the former washery. It is to provide integrated healthcare services for Glynneath, Cwmgwrach, Pontneddfechan, Ystradfellte, Rhigos, Resolven, Clyne and Abergarwed. It will be run by Swansea Bay University Health Board, the Vale of Neath Medical Practice and D R Cecil Jones Pharmacy.
