= Rheola, Wales =

Coordinates: 51.724°N 3.683°W

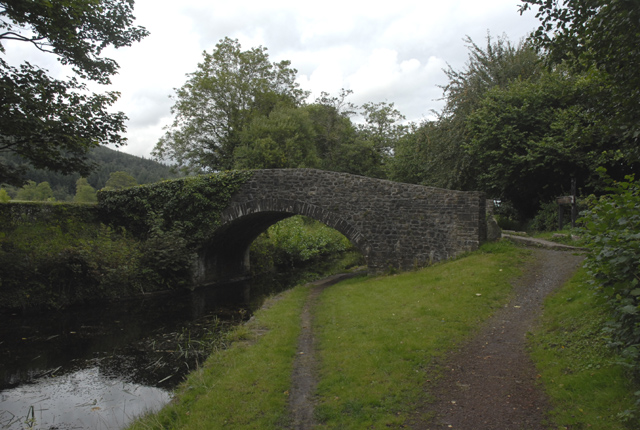
Bridge at Gamlas Nedd near Rheola.

Rheola is a small settlement in the county of Neath Port Talbot. It is situated between Resolven and Glynneath, on the B4242. The Neath Canal, A465 and River Neath all pass nearby. The settlement consists of Rheola House and its ancillary buildings, and stables, sited alongside Rheola Brook, which joins the River Neath 500 yards (metres) to the south. The Rheola Estate was the site of an aluminium factory from 1939 to 1981, although mainly used for coal screening in later years. The Rheola factory buildings were then used as a weekly market. In 2014, permission was granted for building 46 houses on the factory site, as an enabling development to renovate and secure the Grade II* listed Rheola House.

The forest to the north of the Vale of Neath, Rheola Forest, is named after Rheola, and was the locations for the 2007 British National Mountain Biking Championships Downhill events. It was chosen as a special stage in the British Rally from 2006 to 2008.
