= Saint Illtyd's Walk =

Footpath in South Wales

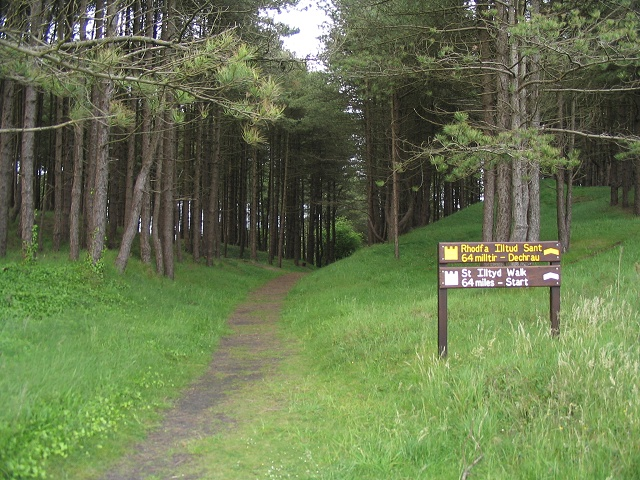
- The start of Saint Illtyd's Walk
- Length: 64 mi (103 km)
- Location: Wales, United Kingdom
- Trailheads: Pembrey Country Park and Margam Country Park
- Use: Hiking

Saint Illtyd's Walk is a 64-mile-long (103 km) waymarked long-distance footpath in South Wales. It runs from Pembrey Country Park, west of Burry Port, through rural eastern Carmarthenshire and Neath Port Talbot to end at Margam Country Park, south of Port Talbot.

The walk is named after Illtyd (or Illtud), a late-fifth / early-sixth century Welsh saint.

== The route ==
The route skirts the fringes of Burry Port, heading east to the Lliedi reservoirs then to Pontarddulais. It then turns northeast heading up via Graig Fawr onto Mynydd y Gwair then heads southeast via Bryn Mawr and Mynydd Carnllechart to the Swansea Canal north of Pontardawe following the towpath past Ynysmeudwy and Cilmaengwyn. The route then climbs east over the northern end of the Mynydd Marchywel ridge and down to cross the River Dulais at Crynant. From there it climbs steeply up through forestry to Sarn Helen which here runs along Hirfynydd and then steeply down to Resolven in the Vale of Neath. Passing Melincourt Falls it climbs again to Cefnmawr and then turns southbound for Cwm Afan. From there it runs through Afan Forest Park to the village of Bryn thence through more forestry via Mynydd Bach before dropping down to Mynydd y Castell and Margam Country Park.

== History ==
The walk was mapped out (over pre-existing footpaths) in 1994, to celebrate the 10th anniversary of the Llanelli Ramblers. Colin Davies, who devised the route, authored a guidebook the same year detailing the walk.
