= Mynydd Marchywel =

Hill in Wales

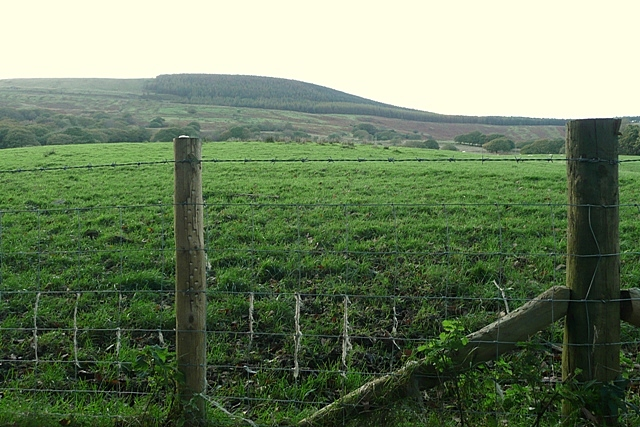
- View of Mynydd Marchywel

Highest point
- Elevation: 418 m (1,371 ft)
- Prominence: 263 m (863 ft)
- Parent peak: Fan Gyhirych
- Listing: Marilyn
- Coordinates: 51.7191°N 3.7847°W

Naming
- Language of name: Welsh

Geography
- Location: Neath Port Talbot, Wales
- OS grid: SN 768037
- Topo map: OS Landranger 170 / Explorer 165

Mynydd Marchywel is a 418-metre (1,371 ft) high hill in the Neath Port Talbot area in South Wales. Its summit is marked both by a cairn and a trig point. The larger part of the hill is cloaked in modern forestry through which numerous streams fall away westward to the River Tawe, eastward to the River Dulais and southward into the Clydach, the latter two being tributaries of the River Neath.

== Geology ==
The hill is formed from multiple layers of Pennant Sandstone with intervening mudstone layers and occasional coal seams. All are tilted to the south and southwest towards the axis of the South Wales Coalfield syncline. Parts of its slopes are mantled by glacial till. The coal seams have been worked extensively in the past. One of the last operations was that at Gleision Colliery under the northwestern side of Mynydd Marchywel.

== Scheduled monuments ==
Mynydd Marchywel summit cairn
This Round cairn dating to the Bronze Age is 10 metres (11 yd) north of the trig pont. The heap of stones, now gradually spreading, has traces of kerbstones amongst the rubble.

Tirlan medieval house sites
(51.709°N 3.7922°W, OS grid ref:SN762026). The earthwork remains of two medieval platform houses, 120 metres (131 yd) apart, are beside a track on the south-east flank of Mynnydd Marchywel, near Tyrlan. Cultivation ridges are also in the vicinity.

== Access ==
Mynydd Marchywel is crossed by Saint Illtyd's Walk which locally runs from Ynysmeudwy to Crynant across the northern slopes of the hill, following one of the very few public rights of way to be found on the hill. There are however numerous forest tracks and most of its western flanks, including the summit area, are designated as open access under the Countryside and Rights of Way Act 2000.

== See also ==
- List of Scheduled Monuments in Neath Port Talbot
