= Hirfynydd =

Highest point
- Elevation: 481 m (1,578 ft)
- Prominence: 246 m (807 ft)
- Parent peak: Fan Gyhirych
- Listing: Marilyn
- Coordinates: 51°45′18″N 3°40′59″W

Naming
- English translation: long mountain
- Language of name: Welsh

Geography
- Location: Neath Port Talbot, Wales
- OS grid: SN839076
- Topo map: OS Landranger 170 / Explorer 165/166

Hirfynydd is a 481-metre-high hill in Neath Port Talbot county borough in South Wales. A Roman road, Sarn Helen, runs along its entire northeast–southwest ridge-line, a route followed by a modern-day byway. To its west is Cwm Dulais and to its southeast is the Vale of Neath. The northern end of the ridge falls away to a broad upland vale containing the Afon Pyrddin and beyond which is the Brecon Beacons National Park.

The larger part of the hill is afforested with conifers. In between the plantations are areas of past or present opencasting for coal.

== Geology ==
The upper parts of the hill are formed from the hard-wearing sandstones and intervening mudstones of the Pennant Sandstone. Beneath these are the mudstones and coal seams of the South Wales Coal Measures. All the strata are tilted in a generally southerly direction towards the axis of the South Wales Coalfield syncline though there is significant local variation, due in part to the proximity of the eastern slopes of the hill to the Neath Disturbance.

== Burial cairn ==
The Bronze Age Carn Cornel Round Cairn is on the shoulder of hillside, west of the ridge and Roman road. (Location: 51.7428°N 3.7152°W, OS grid ref: SN816062.) It is a pile of stones marking a burial, and occupies what appears to be a natural mound. Close by is a boundary stone, suggesting that the site became a historic boundary mark.

== Roman Fortlet ==
On the top of the ridge, at a height of 450 metres (1,480 ft), is a small square earth-banked enclosure, 18x19 metres, with rounded corners. (location: 51.7466°N 3.6979°W). This is a Roman fortlet, or Castellum, used to both control the Carmarthen to Brecon Sarn Helen Roman road, and provide a signal station with wide visibility to the surrounding area. The enclosure is a Scheduled Ancient Monument.

== Medieval settlement ==
There are a group of medieval house platforms on the edge of a plateau of the Hirfynydd ridge, beside the steep slopes of the Dulais valley, showing where a settlement had been. (Location: 51.743°N 3.7306°W, OS grid ref: SN806063). A banked rectangular enclosure has a house platform in the west corner. Two further platforms are west of the enclosure. The site is a Scheduled monument and is also called Coed Ddu and Nant-y-Cafn enclosure.

== Access ==
Parts of the hill are available as open access for walkers under the Countryside and Rights of Way Act 2000. In addition there are numerous forest tracks which provide access and public rights of way in some areas. Saint Illtyd's Walk, a recreational walking trail follows a public bridleway to pass over Hirfynydd between Crynant and Resolven.

== Summits On The Air ==
The mountain has a Summits On The Air (SOTA) reference of GW/SW-017

== See also ==
- List of Scheduled Monuments in Neath Port Talbot
