= Aberdulais Falls =

Coordinates: 51.681260548928535°N 3.7783550440294316°W

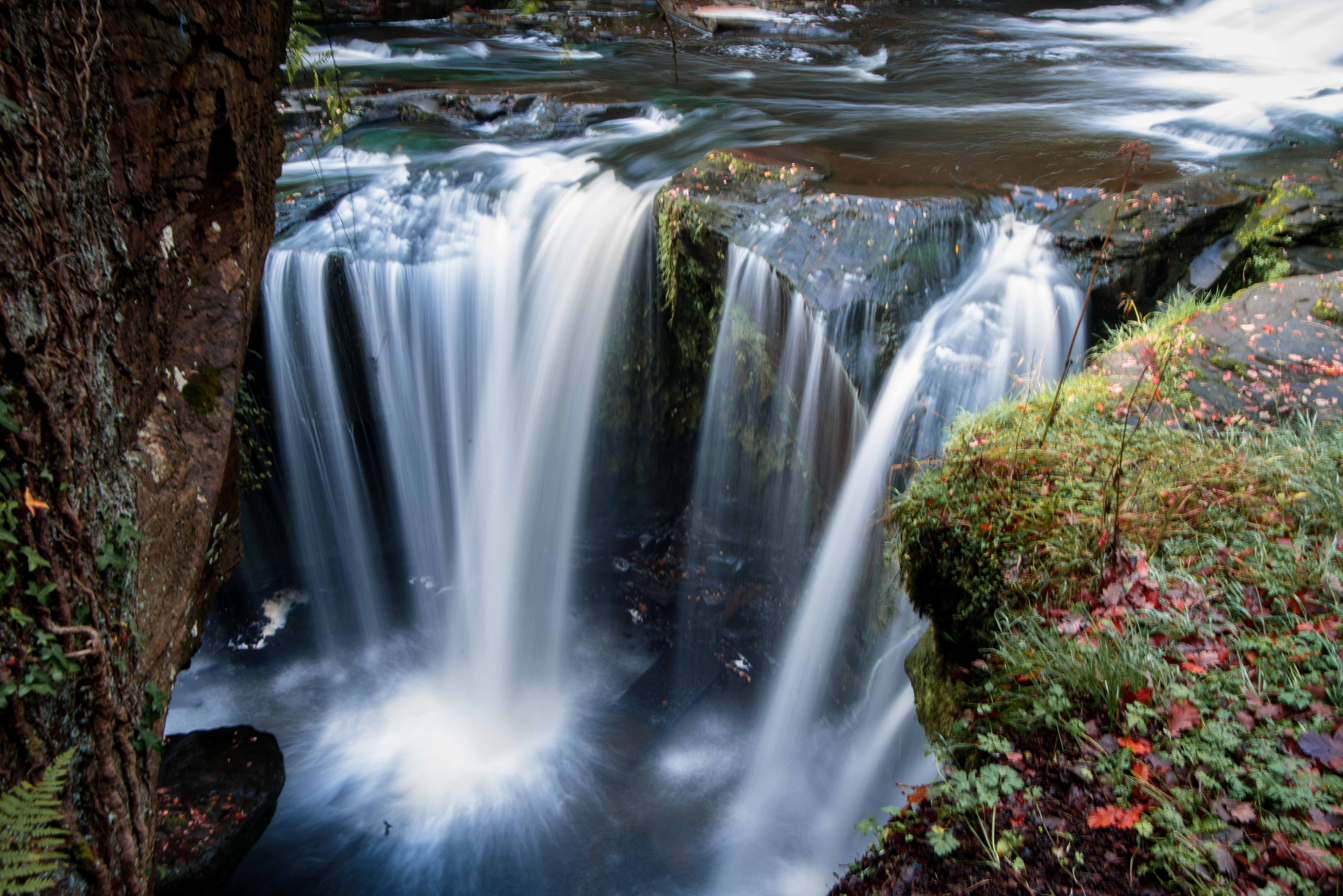
The Falls

The Aberdulais Falls are found on the River Dulais at Aberdulais, near Neath in the county borough of Neath Port Talbot, Wales. The falls are formed as the river plunges over beds of hard Lower Pennant Sandstone just before meeting the River Neath flowing down the Vale of Neath. They are home to one of Europe's largest electricity-generating water wheels.

== The falls ==
The River Dulais rises on Mynydd y Drum in the western Brecon Beacons. It flows down the Dulais Valley, through the villages of Seven Sisters and Crynant, before reaching its confluence with the River Neath after about 7 mi (11 km). Here it flows over a ridge of Pennant sandstone, entering a gorge that was carved by meltwater from a glacier 20,000 years ago. Originally the falls were nearer the sea, but the water has eroded the rock and cut its way back to its present location. The River Dulais is prone to flash floods when heavy rain falls in its catchment area.

== History ==
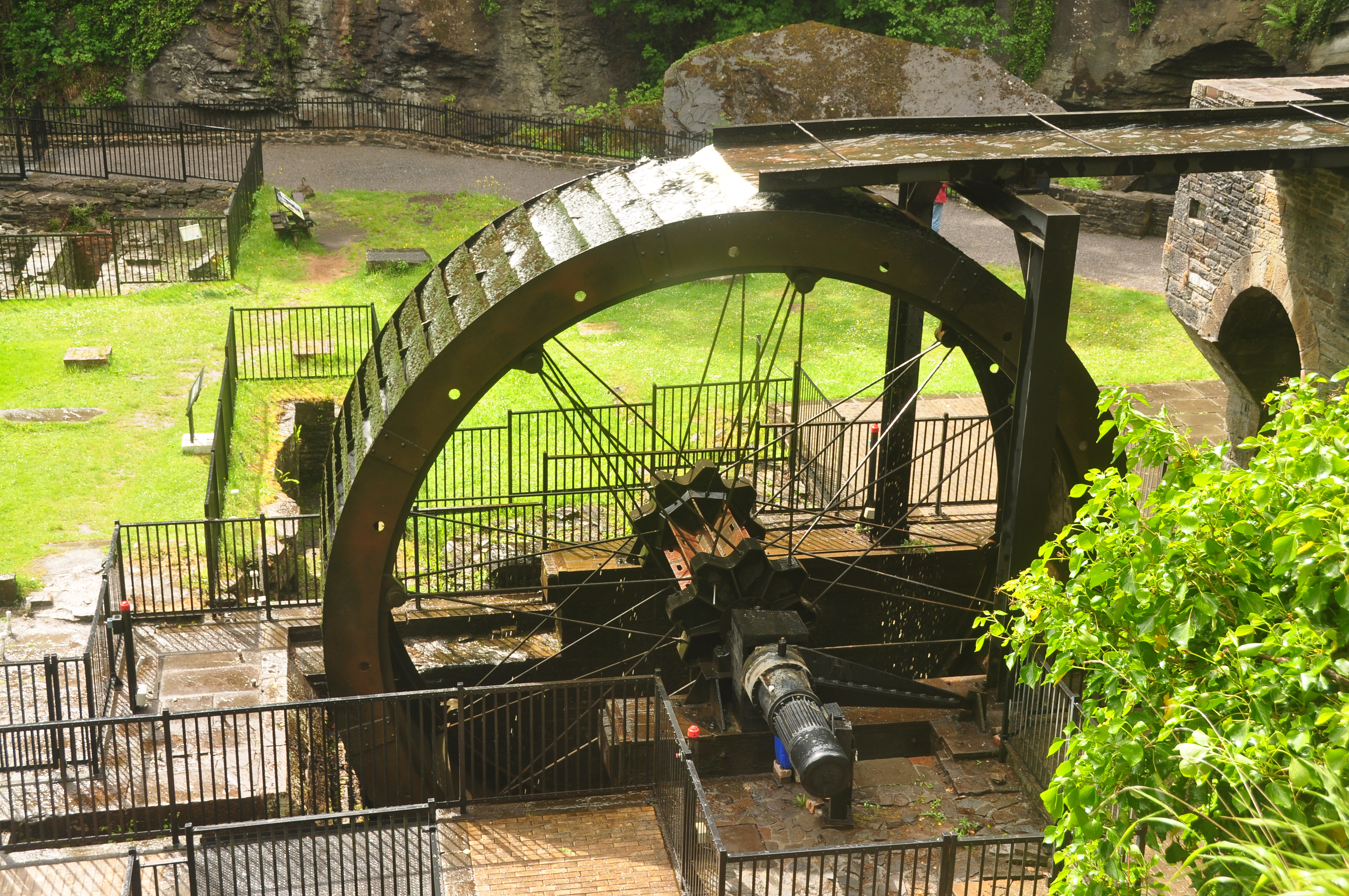
The waterwheel at Aberdulais

Power has been drawn from the waterfall since 1584, when it first provided energy used in the manufacture of copper, using ore imported from Cornwall. The copper-works ceased to operate early in the 17th century, and the site was later used for corn-milling and later as a tinplate works. The weir and waterwheel were added during the 19th century. The waterwheel used today is a modern steel structure. It is the largest waterwheel generating electricity in Europe, with a diameter of 8.2 m (27 ft). It has 72 buckets to catch the falling water and rotates at a rate of five revolutions per minute.

== The falls today ==
The falls and associated industrial infrastructure are in the care of the National Trust in recognition of the site's value as a key part of the region's industrial heritage. Car parking for visitors is available just off the A465 road which passes the site.

== See also ==
- List of waterfalls
- List of waterfalls in Wales
- List of Scheduled Monuments in Neath Port Talbot
