= Dafydd Nicolas =

Dafydd Nicolas, or David Nicholas (c.1705 – 8 February 1774) was a Welsh poet.

== Life ==
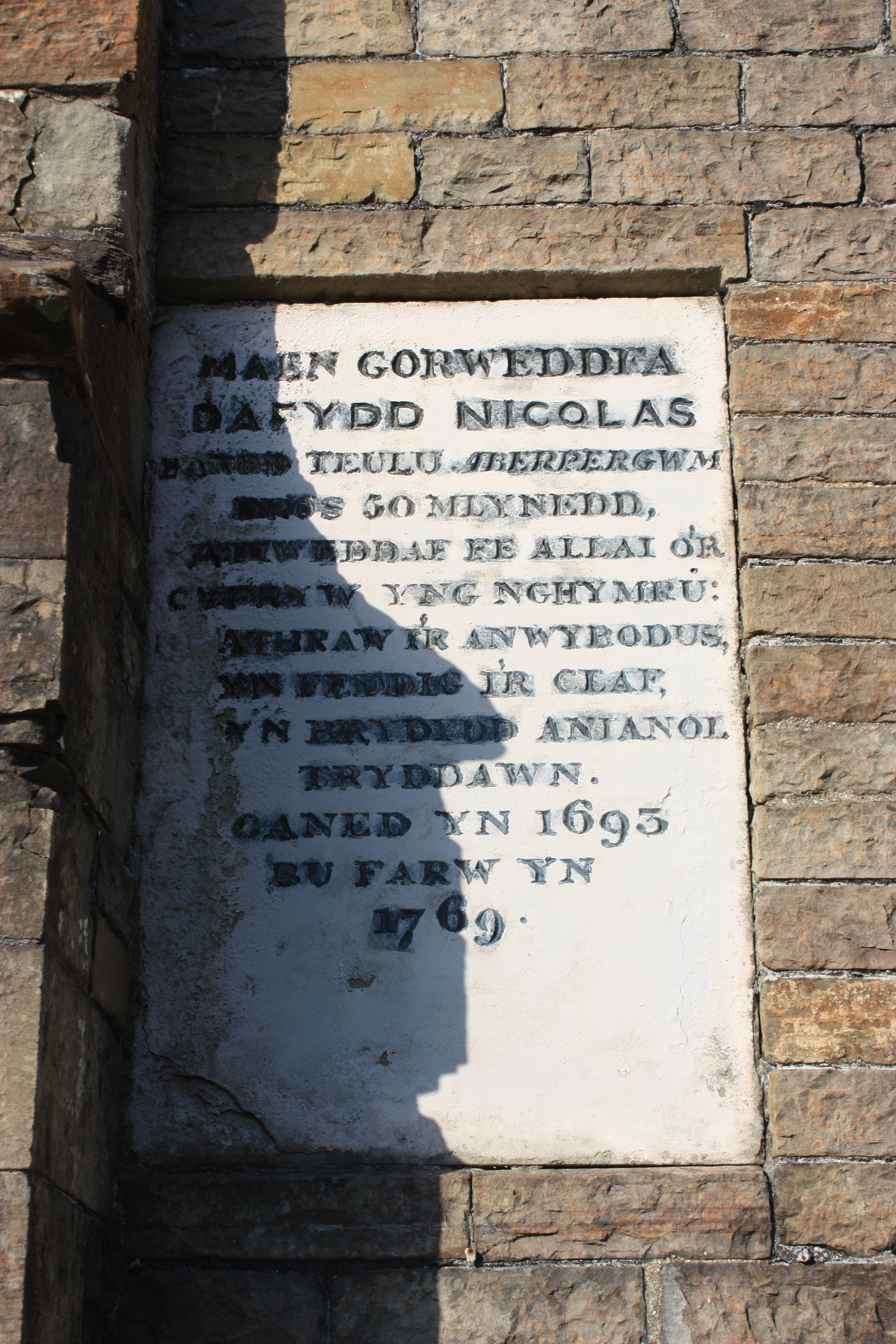
Memorial tablet to Dafydd Nicolas at St Cadoc's Church, in the grounds of Aberpergwm House. The dates are thought to be incorrect.

He was born in Llangynwyd, near Maesteg, Wales; the folklorist Thomas Christopher Evans identified him as the Dafydd Nicolas baptised on 1 July 1705, son of Robert Nicolas and Anne Rees, and who later kept a school in the parish. Nicolas lived later in Ystradyfodwg.

Around the middle of the 18th century, his abilities were noticed by the Williams family of Aberpergwm House, in Glynneath, Glamorgan, and the house was his home for the rest of his life. It was supposed in the 19th century that he was engaged as a family bard (Bardd Teulu), the last in Wales; but the antiquary William Davies of Cringell (1756–1823) stated in the 1790s that Nicolas was engaged as a private tutor to the family.

According to Iolo Morganwg, Nicolas knew Latin, Greek and French, and was the most talented of all the Welsh poets he had known. In the Neath valley it was said that he had translated Homer's Iliad into Welsh.

He is known for his poems in free metre. In Ancient National Airs of Gwent and Morganwg (1844) collected by Maria Jane Williams, two lyrics are attributed to him: "Callyn serchus" and "Ffanni blodau'r ffair". He is thought to have also written "Y deryn pur".

Nicolas died at Aberpergwm on 8 February 1774, and was buried there.
