= Bank of Williams and Rowland =

Bank in South wales

The Bank of Williams and Rowland was a bank established in the 19th century and operating in Neath, in south Wales.

The Bank was formed as a result of a business association between Rees Williams of Aberpergwm House, Glynneath, and John Rowland, both well respected local businessmen, in around 1821. The Bank lasted for nearly 30 years and weathered the Panic of 1825, which wrecked many other banks. The Bank's notes came to be used locally by ‘Country Gentlemen and Farmers’ more so than the Bank of England’s notes. The Bank merged with the Glamorganshire Banking Company in 1836.
