= River Clydach =

River Clydach may refer to the following rivers in Wales:

- Lower Clydach River, Swansea Valley
- Upper Clydach River, Swansea Valley
- River Clydach, Monmouthshire, Monmouthshire
- River Clydach (Neath)
- Nant Clydach, Rhondda
