= 2008 Wales Rally GB =

Rally car race

2008 Rally GB 64th Wales Rally GB
Round 15 of the 2008 World Rally Championship
← Previous event
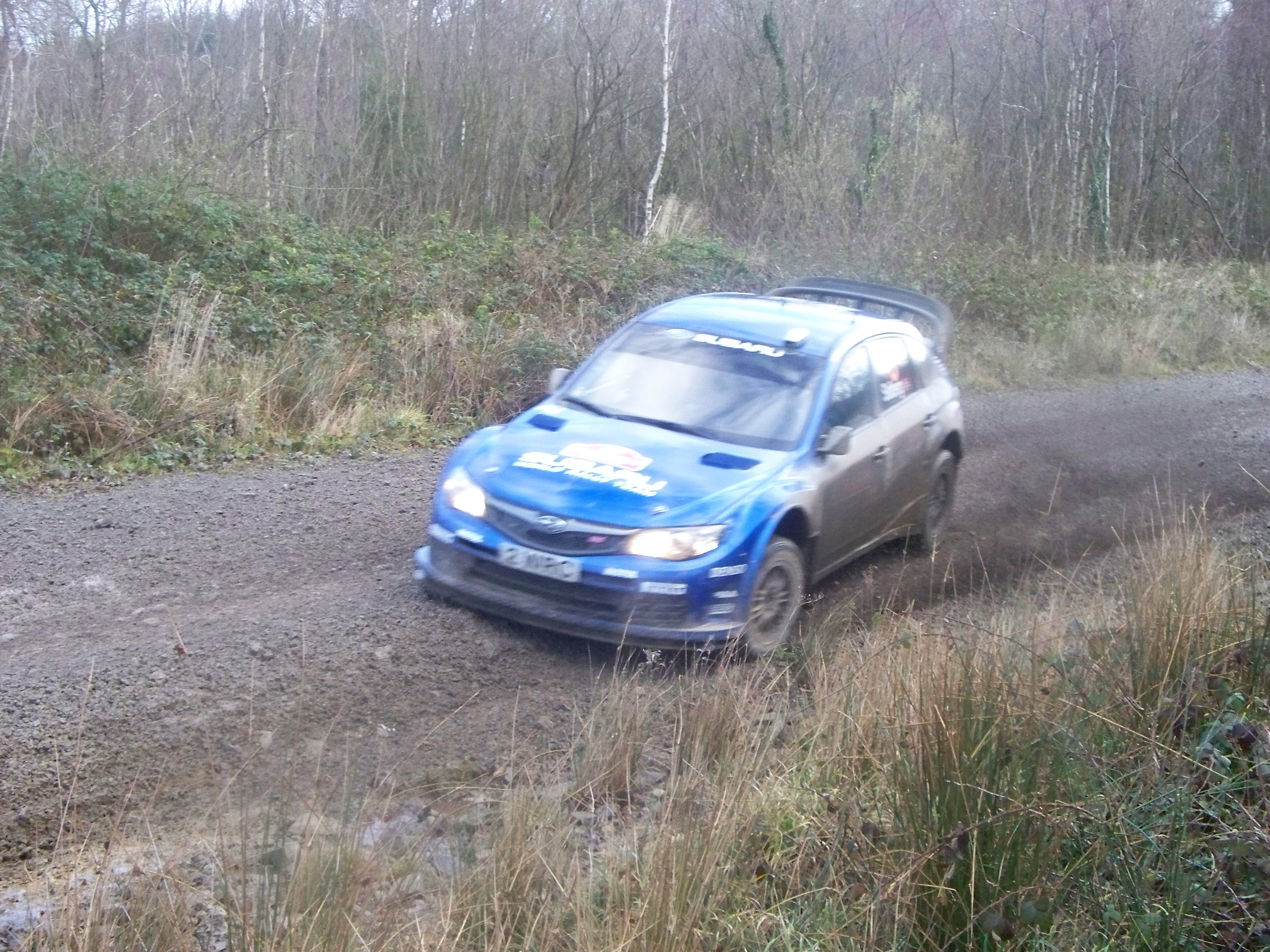
- Petter Solberg sliding on the Shakedown stage of Rally GB
- Rally base: Cardiff
- Dates run: December 5 – 7, 2008
- Stages: 19 (348.99 km; 216.85 miles)
- Stage surface: Gravel/Ice/Snow
- Overall distance: 1,428.44 km (887.59 miles)

Statistics
- Crews: 84 at start, 47 at finish

Overall results
- Overall winner: (France) Sébastien Loeb (France) Citroën Total World Rally Team; Citroën C4 WRC

The 2008 Rally GB was the fifteenth and final round of the 2008 World Rally Championship season and was held between December 5–7, 2008. The event was again held in Wales, with Cardiff being the host of the ceremonial start and finish, and Swansea providing the service park. The special stages took place on gravel roads on private land, owned either by the Forestry Commission (for the special stages run on Friday and Sunday, and the Resolfen stage on Saturday) or the Army (for the remaining Saturday stages). The event saw a return to the mid Wales stages of Hafren, Sweet Lamb, and Myherin for the first time since 2000. The rally was won by Sébastien Loeb in a Citroën C4 WRC. This was his eleventh win of the season - breaking his own previous record set in 2005. Second place went to Ford driver Jari-Matti Latvala who was just 12.7 seconds behind. The final podium position was filled by Loebs teammate Dani Sordo. With this result Citroën clinched the manufacturers championship. This was the final appearance of the Subaru and Suzuki rally teams in the World Rally Championship.

== Entry ==
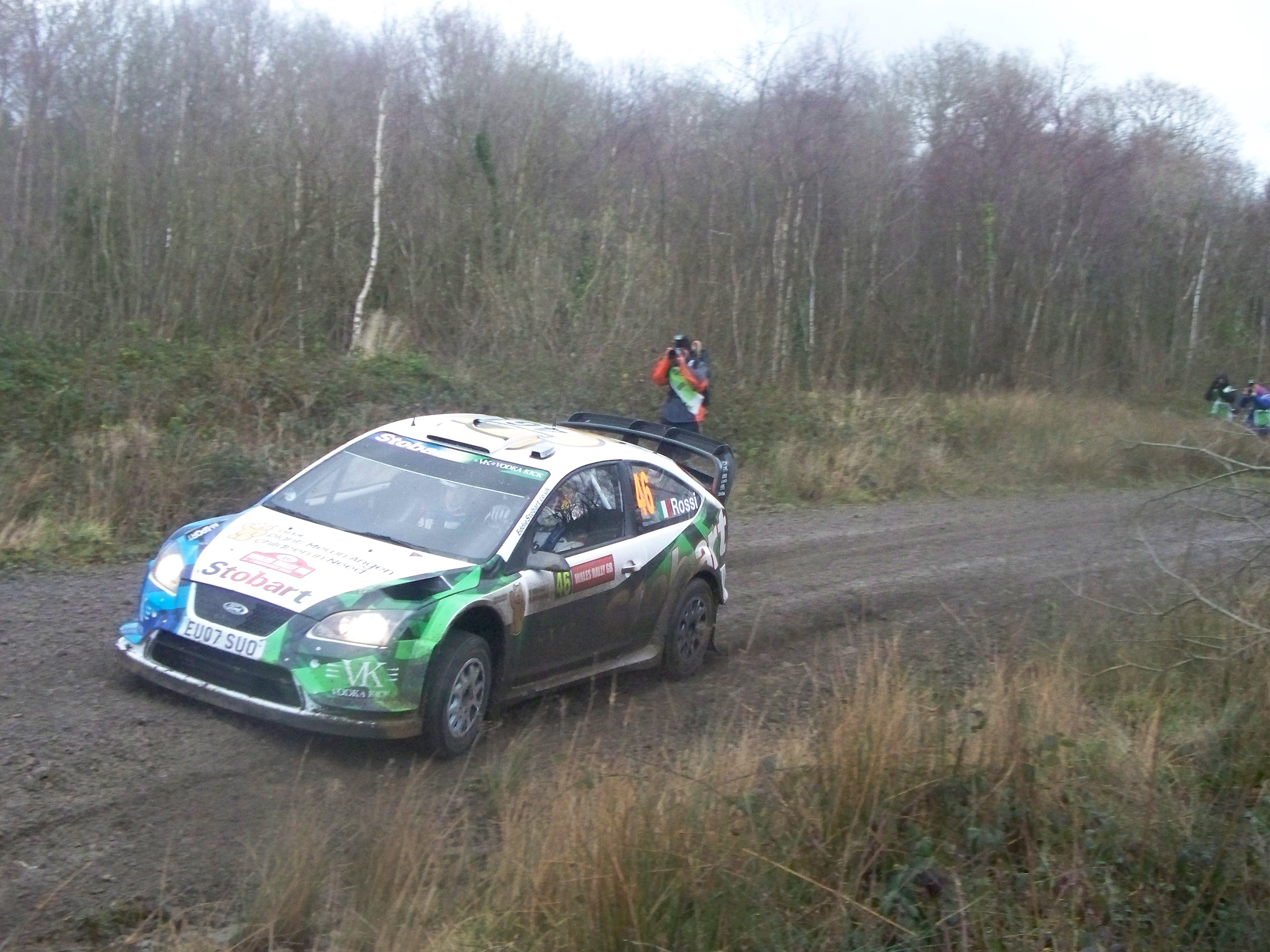
Valentino Rossi during practice for the 2008 Wales Rally GB

The event was supported by the usual works entries from Citroën, Ford, Subaru, Stobart Ford, and Suzuki, plus regular privateers Conrad Rautenbach in his Citroën C4 WRC and Mads Ostberg in a Subaru Impreza WRC. A notable omission was Urmo Aava who was scheduled to enter the event with his semi-works effort Citroën C4, but had to pull out only days before the event due to the ongoing economic problems. In another Citroën C4 was Frenchman Sébastien Ogier who was handed the drive as a reward for winning the JWRC category of the 2008 championship. The most newsworthy entry of all was that of 2008 Moto GP champion Valentino Rossi who was competing in a Ford Focus WRC complete with a Children in Need livery. Rossi was aiming to beat his previous two efforts in a WRC event, an early retirement at 2002 Rally GB and an eleventh-place finish at the 2006 Rally New Zealand.

== Summary ==
=== Day one ===
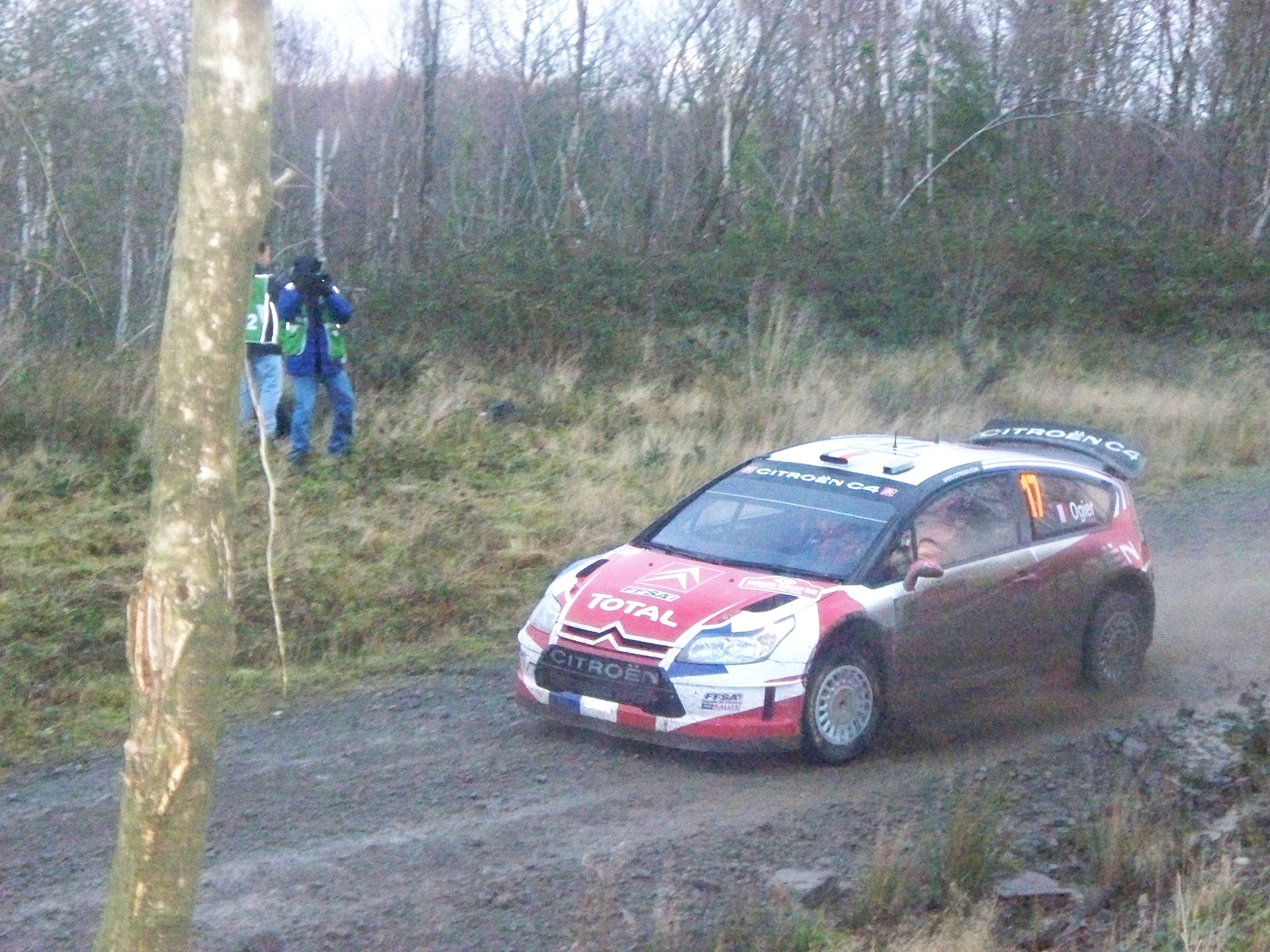
The surprise package of day one - Sébastien Ogier

The rally began in tricky conditions with ice and heavy rain making the roads very slippery and fog hampering the competitors' visibility. For safety reasons, the first and fourth stages held in Hafren (which had already been shortened from 19 km to 3 km) were cancelled. Stages 2 and 4 (Sweet Lamb) were slightly shortened (moving the start around 1 km into the stage due to ice) and the third and sixth stages at Myherin were dramatically shortened, using the middle 18 km of the original 35 km. The FIA regulations came in for criticism from several of the teams and champion elect Sébastien Loeb for the lack of flexibility in the tyre rules which state that only one type of tyre is allowed on the event with no modifications allowed to that tyre. Loeb also spoke out against the lack of gravel crews, which run through the stage before the start and report any bad conditions to the drivers. The year's junior world champion Sébastien Ogier surprised by winning his first stage in a World Rally Car, albeit he was among the competitors to benefit from a late starting position. On the same stage, Production World Rally Championship leader Juho Hänninen retired after his drive shaft broke, leaving Andreas Aigner to take the title if he finishes the event in the top three. On the fifth stage, last year's winner Mikko Hirvonen rolled his Ford Focus WRC and lost several minutes. The next top entrant to roll was Subaru's Chris Atkinson, who was placed sixth before retiring after a bad accident on the first corner of stage seven, the first super special stage. After day one, Ford's Jari-Matti Latvala led from Citroën's Sébastien Loeb, Suzuki's Per-Gunnar Andersson and Subaru privateer Mads Østberg.

=== Day two ===
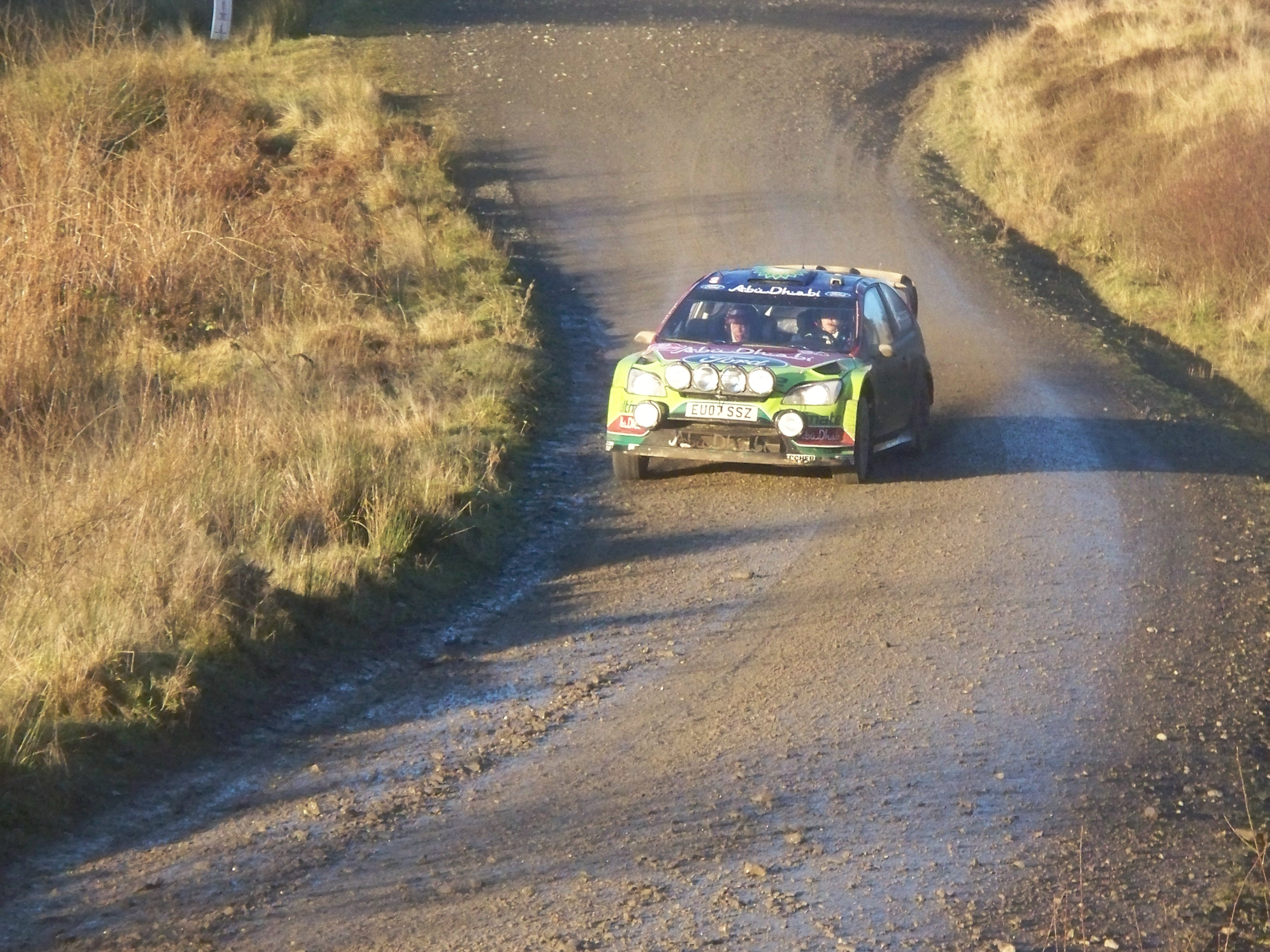
Mikko Hirvonen battled back towards the points positions throughout day two

Day two began with a long stage in Resolfen. Two of the rally's surprises ran into problems; Østberg's Impreza WRC suffered an engine problem and Ogier rolled his C4 WRC very close to the stage finish. The crews reported more icy conditions in the stages, with Latvala feeling particularly ill at ease as he was the first car on the road and therefore the first to encounter the treacherous patches of ice. Throughout the day the conditions improved enough for Latvala to manage to hold off the challenges of firstly Dani Sordo, and then Sébastien Loeb. Latvala held a 10.8 second lead going into the short Cardiff superspecial but clutch problems developed when he had to queue in heavy traffic on the approach to the stage and he lost 3.5 seconds of this advantage. In fourth position was Petter Solberg who was only twenty seconds behind third place. Per-Gunnar Andersson had slipped back to fifth place, but was still three places ahead of his more experienced teammate Toni Gardemeister. The two other points positions were held by Henning Solberg and François Duval. Mikko Hirvonen was homing in on a world championship point, ahead of top home driver Matthew Wilson who was in a slightly disappointing tenth position. Valentino Rossi was making progress after a very steady start and was now in fifteenth position - ahead of WRC regulars such as Khalid Al-Qassimi and Conrad Rautenbach.

=== Day three ===
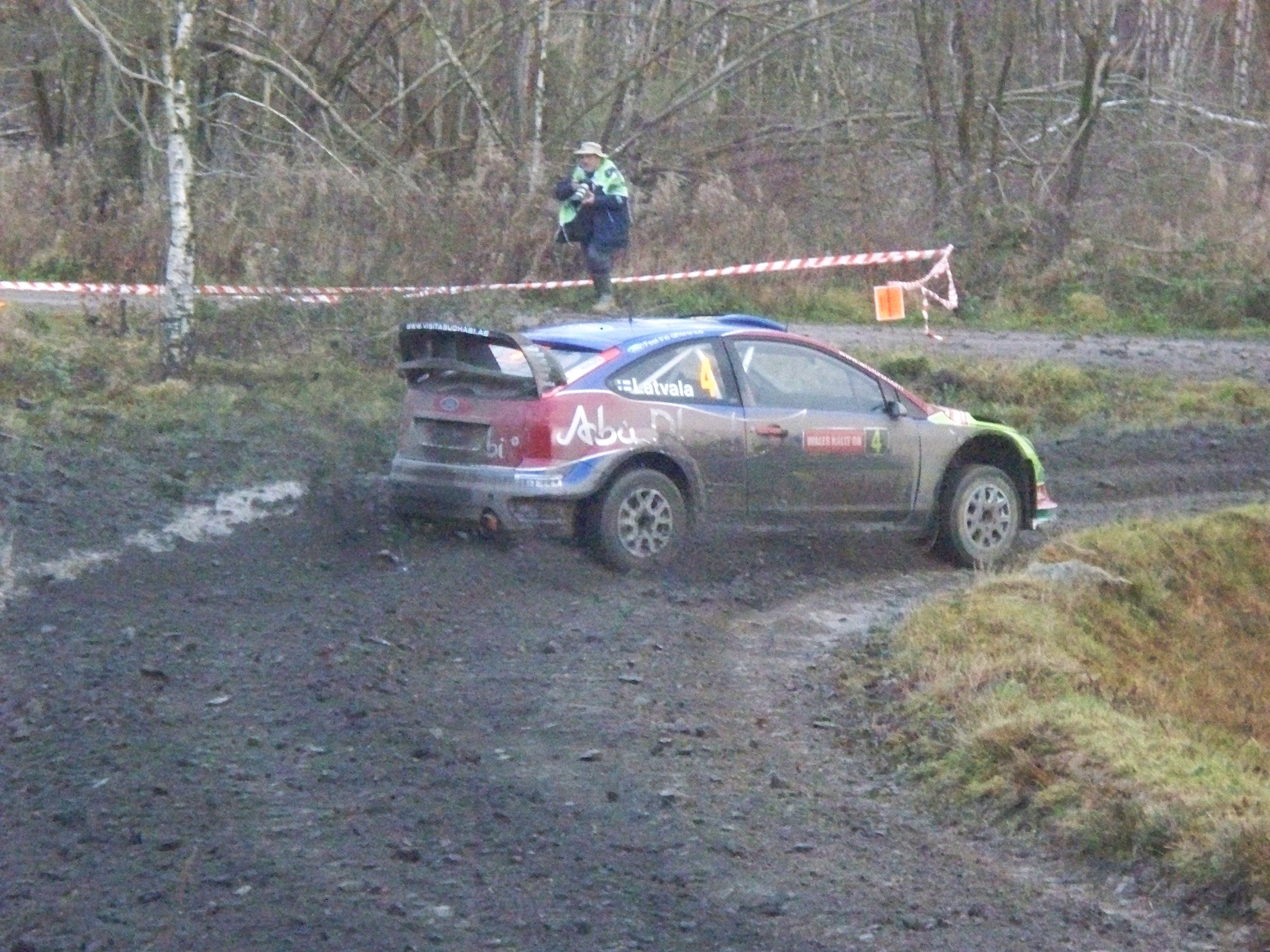
Jari-Matti Latvala had to be content with second place

Freezing conditions overnight meant that there was ice again on the remaining stages at Rheola and Port Talbot. This was not ideal for rally leader Latvala, who had hoped for warmer conditions overnight for a better chance of holding Loeb at bay. Loeb had been told by Citroën boss Olivier Quesnel to push for the victory as a third place for Sordo would be enough to clinch the manufacturers title. After the first loop of Sunday's stages the gap was down to 1.4 seconds and a victory for Loeb was looking inevitable. Loeb was then initially handed a ten-second time penalty for a jump start at SS18 which meant that Latvala took a slender advantage of 2.2 seconds into the last stage. However, Loeb's pace was too strong and a further stage win meant that he won the rally by 12.7 seconds after his earlier time penalty was rescinded. Latvala finished a disappointed second but believed that the battle with Loeb would make him mentally stronger for next season. Sordo followed team instructions to drive carefully and finished third. Petter Solberg maintained his fourth place and the remaining points positions remained the same, except for a late retirement for Henning Solberg which meant that Hirvonen claimed eighth place. Wilson took the position of highest Brit position, ahead of Barry Clark. Rossi continued his progression and finished in twelfth position, earning praise from Ford team boss Malcolm Wilson.

== Results ==
| Pos. | Driver | Co-driver | Car | Time | Difference | Points |
WRC
| 1. | (France) Sébastien Loeb | (Monaco) Daniel Elena | Citroën C4 WRC | 2:43:09.6 | – | 10 |
| 2. | (Finland) Jari-Matti Latvala | (Finland) Miikka Anttila | Ford Focus RS WRC 08 | 2:43:22.3 | 12.7 | 8 |
| 3. | (Spain) Dani Sordo | (Spain) Marc Marti | Citroën C4 WRC | 2:44:30.2 | 1:20.6 | 6 |
| 4. | (Norway) Petter Solberg | (United Kingdom) Phil Mills | Subaru Impreza WRC2008 | 2:45:09.2 | 1:59.6 | 5 |
| 5. | (Sweden) Per-Gunnar Andersson | (Sweden) Jonas Andersson | Suzuki SX4 WRC | 2:47:13.7 | 4:04.1 | 4 |
| 6. | (Belgium) François Duval | (France) Denis Giraudet | Ford Focus RS WRC 07 | 2:48:17.4 | 5:07.8 | 3 |
| 7. | (Finland) Toni Gardemeister | (Finland) Tomi Tuominen | Suzuki SX4 WRC | 2:48:34.6 | 5:25.0 | 2 |
| 8. | (Finland) Mikko Hirvonen | (Finland) Jarmo Lehtinen | Ford Focus RS WRC 08 | 2:48:48.4 | 5:38.8 | 1 |
PCWRC
| 1. | (Sweden) Patrik Flodin | (Sweden) Goran Bergsten | Subaru Impreza WRX STI | 2:56:01.3 | – | 10 |
| 2. | (Austria) Andreas Aigner | (Germany) Klaus Wicha | Mitsubishi Lancer Evo IX | 2:57:43.4 | 1:42.1 | 8 |
| 3. | (United Kingdom) Guy Wilks | (United Kingdom) Phil Pugh | Mitsubishi Lancer Evo IX | 2:58:09.0 | 2:07.7 | 6 |
| 4. | (Finland) Jari Ketomaa | (Finland) Miika Teiskonen | Subaru Impreza WRX STI | 3:00:48.2 | 4:46.9 | 5 |
| 5. | (Czech Republic) Jaromir Tarabus | (Czech Republic) Daniel Trunkát | Fiat Grande Punto S2000 | 3:08:18.6 | 12:17.3 | 4 |
| 6. | (Cyprus) Spyros Pavlides | (United Kingdom) Steve Lancaster | Subaru Impreza WRX STI | 3:21:19.3 | 25:18.0 | 3 |
| 7. | (Portugal) Armindo Araújo | (Portugal) Miguel Ramalho | Mitsubishi Lancer Evo IX | 3:24:53.9 | 28:52.6 | 2 |
| 8. | (United Kingdom) David Higgins | (United Kingdom) Ieuan Thomas | Subaru Impreza WRX STI | 3:28:17.8 | 32:16.5 | 1 |

== Special stages ==
All dates and times are GMT (UTC).

| Day | Stage | Time | Name | Length | Winner | Time | Avg. spd. | Rally leader |
|---|---|---|---|---|---|---|---|---|
| 1 (5 DEC) | SS1 | 09:08 | Hafren 1 | 3.67 km | Cancelled | | | |
| 1 (5 DEC) | SS2 | 09:32 | Sweet Lamb 1 | 4.28 km | (France) S. Ogier | 2:48.6 | 91.4 km/h | (France) S. Ogier |
| 1 (5 DEC) | SS3 | 09:53 | Myherin 1 | 18.28 km | (Finland) J. Latvala | 10:59.2 | 99.8 km/h | (France) S. Ogier |
| 1 (5 DEC) | SS4 | 13:16 | Hafren 2 | 3.67 km | Cancelled | | | (France) S. Ogier |
| 1 (5 DEC) | SS5 | 13:40 | Sweet Lamb 2 | 4.28 km | (France) S. Loeb | 2:50.4 | 90.4 km/h | (France) S. Ogier |
| 1 (5 DEC) | SS6 | 14:01 | Myherin 2 | 18.28 km | (Finland) J. Latvala | 10:56.5 | 100.2 km/h | (Finland) J. Latvala |
| 1 (5 DEC) | SS7 | 17:06 | Walters Arena 1 | 2.29 km | (Finland) J. Latvala | 1:44.5 | 78.9 km/h | (Finland) J. Latvala |
| 1 (5 DEC) | SS8 | 17:17 | Walters Arena 2 | 2.29 km | (France) S. Loeb | 1:45.0 | 78.5 km/h | (Finland) J. Latvala |
| 2 (6 DEC) | SS9 | 08:18 | Resolfen 1 | 30.68 km | (Spain) D. Sordo | 17:12.5 | 107.0 km/h | (Finland) J. Latvala |
| 2 (6 DEC) | SS10 | 09:47 | Halfway 1 | 18.57 km | (Finland) J. Latvala | 11:24.3 | 97.7 km/h | (Finland) J. Latvala |
| 2 (6 DEC) | SS11 | 10:13 | Crychan 1 | 14.86 km | (Spain) D. Sordo | 9:25.1 | 94.7 km/h | (Finland) J. Latvala |
| 2 (6 DEC) | SS12 | 13:21 | Resolfen 2 | 30.68 km | (Finland) M. Hirvonen | 16:19.9 | 112.7 km/h | (Finland) J. Latvala |
| 2 (6 DEC) | SS13 | 14:50 | Halfway 2 | 18.57 km | (France) S. Loeb | 11:11.9 | 99.5 km/h | (Finland) J. Latvala |
| 2 (6 DEC) | SS14 | 15:16 | Crychan 2 | 14.86 km | (Finland) J. Latvala | 9:00.6 | 99.0 km/h | (Finland) J. Latvala |
| 2 (6 DEC) | SS15 | 18:15 | Cardiff | 0.99 km | (France) S. Loeb | 0:56.5 | 63.1 km/h | (Finland) J. Latvala |
| 3 (7 DEC) | SS16 | 07:55 | Rheola 1 | 27.96 km | (France) S. Loeb | 16:15.0 | 103.2 km/h | (Finland) J. Latvala |
| 3 (7 DEC) | SS17 | 09:03 | Port Talbot 1 | 20.09 km | (France) S. Loeb | 11:17.9 | 106.7 km/h | (Finland) J. Latvala |
| 3 (7 DEC) | SS18 | 11:10 | Rheola 2 | 27.96 km | (France) S. Loeb | 16:25.0 | 102.2 km/h | (France) S. Loeb |
| 3 (7 DEC) | SS19 | 12:18 | Port Talbot 2 | 20.09 km | (France) S. Loeb | 11:12.0 | 107.6 km/h | (France) S. Loeb |

== Final championship standings ==
=== Drivers' championship ===
| Pos | Driver | MON (Monaco) | SWE (Sweden) | MEX (Mexico) | ARG (Argentina) | JOR (Jordan) | ITA (Italy) | GRC (Greece) | TUR (Turkey) | FIN (Finland) | GER (Germany) | NZL (New Zealand) | ESP (Spain) | FRA (France) | JPN (Japan) | GBR (United Kingdom) | Pts |
|---|---|---|---|---|---|---|---|---|---|---|---|---|---|---|---|---|---|
| 1 | (France) Sébastien Loeb | 1 | Ret | 1 | 1 | 10 | 1 | 1 | 3 | 1 | 1 | 1 | 1 | 1 | 3 | 1 | 122 |
| 2 | (Finland) Mikko Hirvonen | 2 | 2 | 4 | 5 | 1 | 2 | 3 | 1 | 2 | 4 | 3 | 3 | 2 | 1 | 8 | 103 |
| 3 | (Spain) Dani Sordo | 11 | 6 | 17 | 3 | 2 | 5 | 5 | 4 | 4 | 2 | 2 | 2 | Ret | DSQ | 3 | 65 |
| 4 | (Finland) Jari-Matti Latvala | 12 | 1 | 3 | 15 | 7 | 3 | 7 | 2 | 39 | 9 | Ret | 6 | 4 | 2 | 2 | 58 |
| 5 | (Australia) Chris Atkinson | 3 | 21 | 2 | 2 | 3 | 6 | Ret | 13 | 3 | 6 | Ret | 7 | 6 | 4 | Ret | 50 |
| 6 | (Norway) Petter Solberg | 5 | 4 | 12 | Ret | Ret | 10 | 2 | 6 | 6 | 5 | 4 | 5 | 5 | 8 | 4 | 46 |
| 7 | (Belgium) François Duval | 4 | | | | | | | | | 3 | Ret | 4 | 3 | Ret | 6 | 25 |
| 8 | (Norway) Henning Solberg | 9 | 13 | 5 | Ret | 4 | 7 | 8 | 5 | 5 | 7 | 9 | 11 | 15 | Ret | Ret | 22 |
| 9 | (Italy) Gigi Galli | 6 | 3 | Ret | 7 | 8 | 4 | Ret | Ret | Ret | Ret | Inj | Inj | Inj | Inj | Inj | 17 |
| 10 | (United Kingdom) Matthew Wilson | 10 | Ret | 6 | Ret | 5 | 12 | 6 | 7 | 9 | 12 | 17 | 9 | 8 | 7 | 9 | 15 |
| 11 | (Estonia) Urmo Aava | | 18 | | | Ret | 8 | 4 | Ret | 16 | 8 | 5 | 35 | 7 | | | 13 |
| 12 | (Sweden) Per-Gunnar Andersson | 8 | Ret | Ret | 24 | Ret | 9 | 11 | Ret | Ret | 15 | 6 | 32 | 17 | 5 | 5 | 12 |
| 13 | (Finland) Toni Gardemeister | Ret | 7 | Ret | Ret | Ret | Ret | 9 | Ret | 8 | 10 | 7 | 13 | 13 | 6 | 7 | 10 |
| 14 | (Argentina) Federico Villagra | | | 7 | 6 | 6 | 14 | 13 | 9 | Ret | | 8 | 12 | | 9 | | 9 |
| 15 | (Zimbabwe) Conrad Rautenbach | Ret | 16 | 16 | 4 | 26 | 13 | 10 | 8 | 10 | 10 | Ret | Ret | 14 | Ret | 15 | 6 |
| 16 | (Norway) Andreas Mikkelsen | | 5 | | | | Ret | | 19 | 12 | 11 | | 8 | 11 | | | 5 |
| 17 | (France) Jean-Marie Cuoq | 7 | | | | | | | | | | | | | | | 2 |
| 17 | (Finland) Matti Rantanen | | | | | | | | | 7 | | | | | | | 2 |
| 19 | (Finland) Juho Hänninen | | 8 | | | | | 21 | | 13 | | 14 | 29 | 24 | 10 | Ret | 1 |
| 19 | (France) Sébastien Ogier | | | 8 | | 11 | 22 | | | 36 | 19 | | Ret | 20 | | 26 | 1 |
| 19 | (Austria) Andreas Aigner | | 31 | | 8 | | | 14 | 11 | Ret | | Ret | | | | 13 | 1 |
| Pos | Driver | MON (Monaco) | SWE (Sweden) | MEX (Mexico) | ARG (Argentina) | JOR (Jordan) | ITA (Italy) | GRC (Greece) | TUR (Turkey) | FIN (Finland) | GER (Germany) | NZL (New Zealand) | ESP (Spain) | FRA (France) | JPN (Japan) | GBR (United Kingdom) | Pts |

Key
| Colour | Result |
|---|---|
| Gold | Winner |
| Silver | 2nd place |
| Bronze | 3rd place |
| Green | Points finish |
| Blue | Non-points finish |
| Blue | Non-classified finish (NC) |
| Purple | Did not finish (Ret) |
| Black | Excluded (EX) |
| Black | Disqualified (DSQ) |
| White | Did not start (DNS) |
| White | Cancelled (C) |
| Blank | Withdrew entry from the event (WD) |

=== Manufacturers' championship ===
| Rank | Team | Event | | | | | | | | | | | | | | | Total points |
| Rank | Team | MON (Monaco) | SWE (Sweden) | MEX (Mexico) | ARG (Argentina) | JOR (Jordan) | ITA (Italy) | GRC (Greece) | TUR (Turkey) | FIN (Finland) | GER (Germany) | NZL (New Zealand) | ESP (Spain) | FRA (France) | JPN (Japan) | GBR (United Kingdom) | Total points |
|---|---|---|---|---|---|---|---|---|---|---|---|---|---|---|---|---|---|
| 1 | (France) Citroën Total World Rally Team | 11 | 4 | 10 | 16 | 9 | 14 | 15 | 11 | 15 | 18 | 18 | 18 | 10 | 6 | 16 | 191 |
| 2 | (United Kingdom) BP Ford World Rally Team | 8 | 18 | 11 | 7 | 13 | 14 | 10 | 18 | 9 | 7 | 6 | 11 | 14 | 18 | 9 | 173 |
| 3 | (Japan) Subaru World Rally Team | 10 | 6 | 9 | 8 | 6 | 3 | 8 | 3 | 9 | 7 | 5 | 6 | 7 | 6 | 5 | 98 |
| 4 | (United Kingdom) Stobart M-Sport Ford Rally Team | 8 | 8 | 3 | 3 | 7 | 5 | 3 | 4 | 4 | 6 | 0 | 4 | 7 | 2 | 3 | 67 |
| 5 | (Japan) Suzuki World Rally Team | 2 | 3 | 0 | 1 | 0 | 1 | 3 | 0 | 2 | 1 | 7 | 0 | 1 | 7 | 6 | 34 |
| 6 | (Argentina) Munchi's Ford World Rally Team | 0 | 0 | 6 | 4 | 4 | 2 | 0 | 3 | 0 | 0 | 3 | 0 | 0 | 0 | 0 | 22 |
