= Maria Jane Williams =

Welsh musician and folklorist (c.1795–1873)

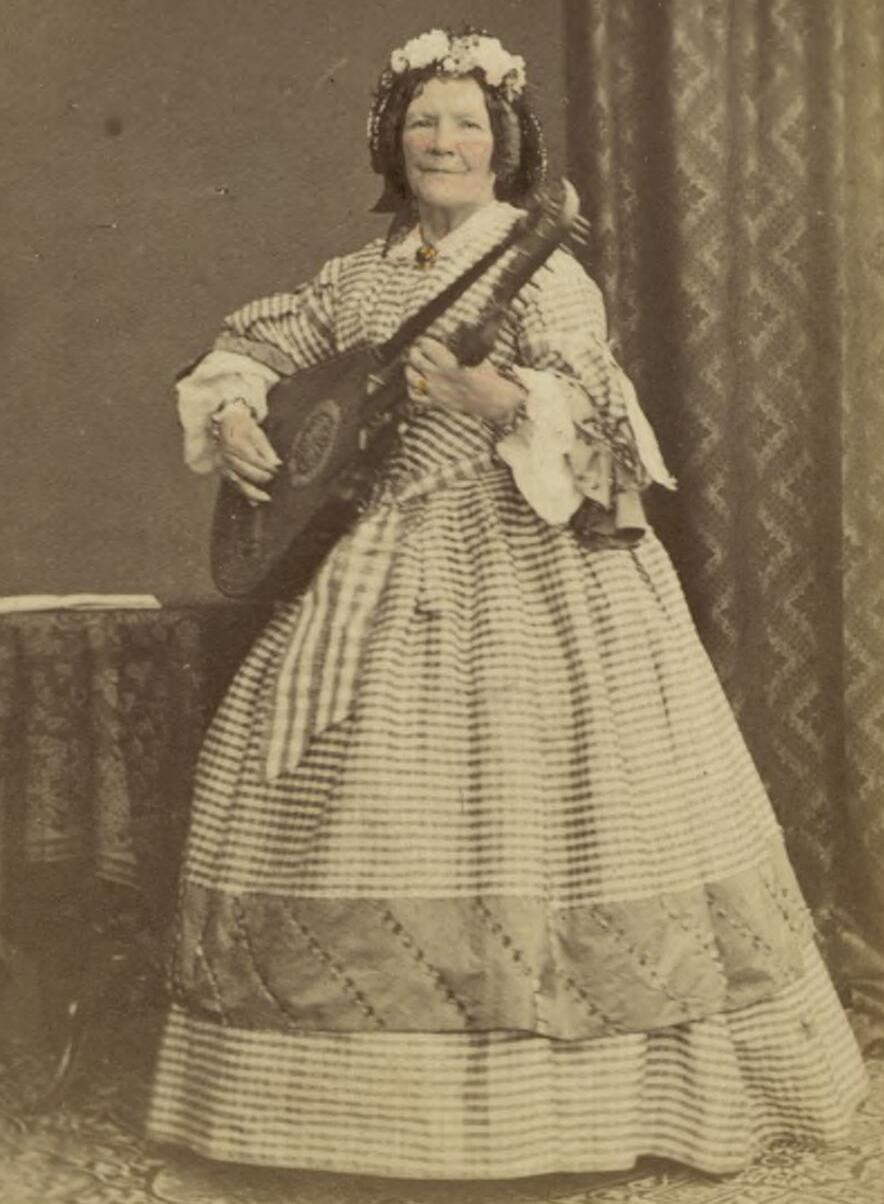
Maria Jane Williams, around 1865

Maria Jane Williams (1795 – 10 November 1873) was a 19th-century Welsh musician and folklorist born at Aberpergwm House, Glynneath in the historic county of Glamorganshire, South Wales. She was the second daughter of Rees Williams of Aberpergwm in the Vale of Neath and Ann Jenkins of Fforest, Ystradfellte and the sister of William Williams, her eldest briother, who was the first to suggest the formation of a Welsh Manuscripts Society. From an early age Williams displayed she displayed an extraordinary talent for music. She won several Eisteddfodic prizes. However, perhaps she is most highly regarded for her book The Ancient National Airs of Gwent and Morgannwg which rescued many Welsh songs from obscurity, including Y Deryn Pur (The Gentle Bird) and Y Ferch o'r Sger (The Maid of Sker).

== Life ==
Williams was born in 1795 at Aberpergwm House, Glynneath to 'an old Welsh family in South Wales.' Her father was Rees Williams of Aberpergwm in the Vale of Neath and her mother was Ann Jenkins of Fforest Ystradfellte. She had three brothers, William, Rees and Thomas, and a sister. Her eldest brother, William Williams (1788-1855), is credited with having been the first person to suggest the idea of a Welsh Manuscripts Society. She lived in Blaen Baglan. But in her later years she lived at a house called Ynys-las, near Aberpergwm House. She died in 1873 and is buried at St Cadoc's Church in the grounds of Aberpergwm House.

== Education and scholarly studies ==
Maria Jane Williams 'received the best possible education, and at an early age displayed an extraordinary talent for music.' She was a supporter of the Welsh language and traditions and she had an extensive knowledge of music. She was especially acclaimed for her singing and was an accomplished player of the guitar, and the harp, having been taught by the famous harpist Alvers (who might have been Elias Parish Alvars). Henry Fothergill Chorley said that she was "the most exquisite amateur singer he had ever heard". She acquired the name ‘Llinos’ (the Welsh word for linnet), and was associated with the Cymreigyddion y Fenni and made her home a focus for ‘Celtic Renaissance’ enthusiasts.

== Book of Fairy Tales ==
In 1826–7 Williams made a collection of the fairy tales of the Vale of Neath, which was published in the supplemental volume of Crofton Croker's ‘Irish Fairy Legends’ and subsequently reprinted in an abridged form in the ‘Fairy Mythology’ of Thomas Keightley who had suggested that she should make the collection.

== Book of Welsh folk songs ==
The October 1837 eisteddfod at Abergavenny was held under the patronage of Lady Llanover, who later became Williams' friend. At the event she was awarded the prize for the best collection of unpublished Welsh music. It was published in 1844 under the title of The Ancient National Airs of Gwent and Morgannwg. Despite later criticisms this book remains an important contribution to the knowledge of traditional Welsh music. It contains 43 songs with Welsh words and accompaniments for the harp or piano. And it provides notes on the songs and a list of persons for whom copies of it had been printed, which evidenced how well patronised Welsh folk song was during this period. The book was initially republished in 1988 by the Welsh Folk Song Society with a contemporary introduction and notes by Daniel Huws, which in turn was republished in 2015. Through this collection Williams rescued many songs, the best known being Y Deryn Pur (The Gentle Dove) and Y Ferch o'r Sger (The Maid of Sker). In October 1838, at the ensuing Eisteddfod, she won a prize for the best arrangement of any Welsh air for four voices.

Lucy Broadwood, an ex-president and mentor of the Folk Song Society, and one of the earliest collectors of Celtic folk songs, in a scathing attack on the folklorists of the day, claimed that during the period 1800 to 1850 in Wales, as in the rest of Britain, ‘a mass of "traditional" and so-called "Druidical" songs was published which does not bear critical investigation.’ However, she claimed that Maria Jane Williams was one of only two people in Britain at this time who were the exception to this rule. Maria Jane Williams claimed that: ‘The songs were given as...obtained,...in their wild and original state; no embellishments of the melody have been attempted, and the accompanying words are those sung to the airs.’

Williams helped John Parry to produce the ‘Welsh Harper’ and John Thomas consulted her before publishing his two volumes of Welsh airs.
