= Abergarwed =

Village in Neath Port Talbot, Wales

Coordinates: 51°42′29″N 3°42′45″W

Abergarwed is a village in the Welsh county borough of Neath Port Talbot, south Wales.

It is located in the Vale of Neath, in the electoral ward of Resolven, near the town of Neath.
