= Clyne, Neath Port Talbot =

Village in Wales

Clyne: Welsh: Y Clun
- Location within Neath Port Talbot
- OS grid reference: SN803009
- Community: Clyne and Melincourt
- Principal area: Neath Port Talbot
- Preserved county: West Glamorgan
- Country: Wales
- Sovereign state: United Kingdom
- Post town: NEATH
- Postcode district: SA11
- Police: South Wales
- Fire: Mid and West Wales
- Ambulance: Welsh
- List of places UK Wales Neath Port Talbot 51.694°N 3.731°W Map of the Clyne and Melincourt community

Clyne is a village in the Neath Port Talbot county borough, Wales, and is the main settlement in the community of Clyne and Melincourt which with the community of Resolven make up the electoral ward of Resolven. The population at the 2011 census was 819. The community includes a large rural area and the River Neath and Neath Canal form the western boundary.
