= Crynant =

Village in Wales

Crynant: Welsh: Y Creunant
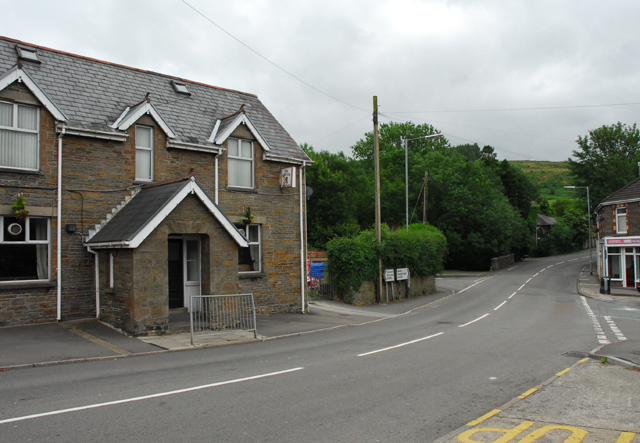
- The Square, Crynant

- Location within Neath Port Talbot
- Population: 1,910 (2011)
- OS grid reference: SN793047
- Principal area: Neath Port Talbot
- Preserved county: West Glamorgan
- Country: Wales
- Sovereign state: United Kingdom
- Post town: NEATH
- Postcode district: SA10
- Dialling code: 01639
- Police: South Wales
- Fire: Mid and West Wales
- Ambulance: Welsh
- UK Parliament: Neath and Swansea East
- List of places UK Wales Neath Port Talbot 51.728°N 3.747°W Map of the community

Crynant (Welsh: Y Creunant) is a village and community in the Dulais Valley in Wales. It lies 7¾ miles north-east from the town of Neath in Neath Port Talbot, situated between the mountains of Mynydd Marchywel to the west, Hirfynydd to the east and Mynydd y Drum to the north.

Crynant is a long village, lying on the narrow valley floor and lower slopes of Hirfynydd. Originally there were separate villages (essentially separate farms), such as the region of Treforgan, but all have now merged into a single village. The River Dulais flows through the village.

== Etymology ==
The Welsh name Y Creunant derives from creu (or nghreu) meaning creation or beginning, and nant meaning stream or brook. A different interpretation of the prefix is crai, implying a narrow place, therefore a brook that makes its way through a narrow place. Another explanation states that the place name is a contraction of Croyw-nant, the clear brook. Creu also means a pound, as in an animal pound by the stream; a pound was known to have been sited on ground opposite the Red Lion pub at the town square.

== History ==
In the Middle Ages, there was a small monastic cell in Crynant where monks and other pilgrims would break their journeys. The village first appeared on maps as Capel Creunant (Creunant Chapel), which may have referred to the monastic outpost. Crynant remained a rural agricultural community of scattered farms until the discovery of coal in the 19th century.

The first colliery was Maes Mawr Colliery, opened in 1874. It can still be seen at the site of the old Blaenant Colliery at the top end of Brynawel Pen Pentre, a terrace of old cottages which was the first street to be built in the village. Men seeking work in the mines began arriving in Creunant, and the current village started taking shape, centred on the Square. Pen Pentre, the Square, Maes Mawr and Station Road all date from the 19th century. Station Road referred to the Neath and Brecon Railway, built in the mid-1860s, which ran through the village.

Cefn Coed Colliery opened in 1928 and was claimed to be the deepest anthracite mine in the world. It closed in 1968 and the site now houses the Cefn Coed Colliery Museum.

None of the collieries are operational today, and all but one have largely been reclaimed by nature. The only colliery with some buildings remaining in good repair is Blaenant, which was the last colliery to close and was an extension of Cefn Coed. Until the late 1980s, there was another large colliery in the village, Treforgan Colliery, which has since been demolished. Part of the former site was used to establish Crynant Business Park. Scattered around the village are the remains of older collieries, such as Tynewydd and Top Jebbs.

The end of coal mining changed the face of the village, the valley and the whole of the South Wales Coalfield. The valley is beginning to develop from an economic depression brought with the end of industry, and services are limited.

== Politics ==
Crynant is in the Senedd constituency and UK Parliamentary constituency of Neath.

Following a 2020 boundary review by the Local Democracy and Boundary Commission for Wales, Crynant was joined by the neighbouring communities of Onllwyn and Seven Sisters to become the Crynant, Onllwyn and Seven Sisters electoral ward, effective from the 2022 local elections. Two councillors are elected to Neath Port Talbot County Borough Council.

The former ward of Crynant consisted of some or all of the settlements of Crynant, Treforgan and Ynysfadog.

In the 2017 local council elections, the results were:

Candidate	Party	Votes	Status
Sian Harris	Independent	448	Independent gain
Karen Pearson	Labour	250	
Suzanne Waldron	Plaid Cymru	147	

In the 2012 local council elections, the electorate turnout was 41.46%. The results were:

Candidate	Party	Votes	Status
Karen Pearson	Labour	370	Labour gain
William Morgan	Plaid Cymru	280	

== Employment ==
Farming is still important to the village, with sheep and beef cattle raised on the hillsides. The village has a few small shops, the most well known being Segadelli's (or Stella's) sweet shop on the Square.

Crynant Business Park has been established on the Treforgan Colliery site, enabling smaller companies to generate some employment for the community. Crynant Plant, a building and demolition company, is still by far the largest industry in the area. However, most people commute to work to Neath, Swansea, or further afield.

== Local environment ==
The coal tips to the south of the village have been removed, and those at Treforgan are now hidden under silver birch. Both sides of the village used to be covered by farmed conifer forests, but these were removed by the Forestry Commission in order for native trees to grow.

The River Dulais flows through the village. A slaughterhouse stood on the banks of the river, at the end of Maes Mawr. The red lines at the top of the Crynant RFC emblem apparently represent the red river.

== Locations and buildings of note ==
To the west of the village, on the old Neath road, lies Tyn-y-graig Mansion. It was built by the owner of the Vale of Neath Brewery, David Evans-Bevan, for his daughter.

Saint Illtyd's Walk also passes through Crynant. Gelli Galed, a ruined farmhouse dating back to the 17th century, which is perched on a ridge of Marchywel mountain above the village, was used as a chapel during the 18th century.

Built in the mid 1800s, Crynant National School was the first organised school in the valley. It was once a thriving hub for the community before it was sold and fell into disrepair.

=== Chapels and churches ===
There are currently four active places of worship in the village: Godrerhos Independent Chapel (built in 1754), Saron Independent Chapel (built in 1904 during the Welsh revival and daughter chapel of Godrerhos), Bethel Wesleyan Methodist Chapel and St Margaret's Church in Wales.

An ancient chapel of ease remains standing on the Square and is in good condition. It is of medieval origin.

Salem Calvinistic Methodist chapel closed as a working chapel in 2017 and was taken over by a community group until 2023. The original chapel was situated at Pen-pentre, and is now a residential property as is Salem Chapel.

Other previous places of worship included Zion English Methodist Chapel, Glasfryn and Bethania Welsh Baptist Chapel on Woodland Road. Worship services were also once held at Gelligaled farm when Nonconformity in the area was forbidden.

== Sport and leisure ==
Crynant is home to Crynant RFC, a rugby union club founded in 1898. It is home to the village's only remaining social club.

The Gradon, on the main road slightly north of Creunant Business park, is the last remaining pub in the village. Its unusual name was derived from the names Grant and Donna, the children of a previous owner. It was previously known as the British Legion.

Former pubs include the Kingfisher and the Red Lion, which had been in business since 1850. The Welfare, a miners' working men's club, declined after the closure of the coal mines in the 1980s, and eventually closed.

The village once hosted a carnival every year; this stopped with the demise of coal mining. During World War II, Crynant it was famous for the pantomimes which it produced every year and which toured the surrounding villages.

== Notable people ==
Notables who were born or lived in Crynant include:

- Connor Roberts, professional footballer
- Geraint F. Lewis, Professor of Astrophysics at the University of Sydney, Australia
- Mike Smith, saxophonist for the 1960s band Amen Corner
- Daral Pugh, professional footballer
- Verden Allen, organist with Mott the Hoople
