= River Clydach (Neath) =

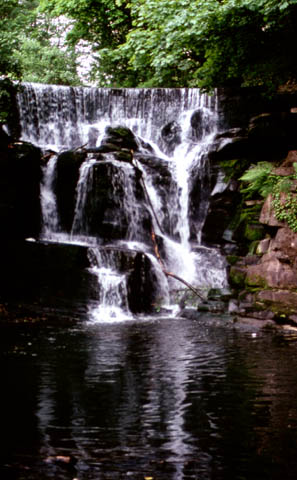
Falls on the River Clydach at Longford, near Neath Abbey

The River Clydach or Afon Clydach is a river in the county borough of Neath Port Talbot, Wales. It runs generally southwards from the western slopes of Mynydd Marchywel for about 9 km and past Fforest Goch, Bryncoch and Neath Abbey to join the River Neath near Neath. Each of the rivers bearing the name 'Clydach' in South Wales is thought to derive from an earlier Celtic word 'klou' or 'kleu' together with the suffix '-ach' which is of Irish origin. The sense is of a 'strong-flowing', 'washing' or stony river.
