= Aberpergwm House =

Ruinous country house in Wales

Coordinates: 51.7434°N 3.6423°W

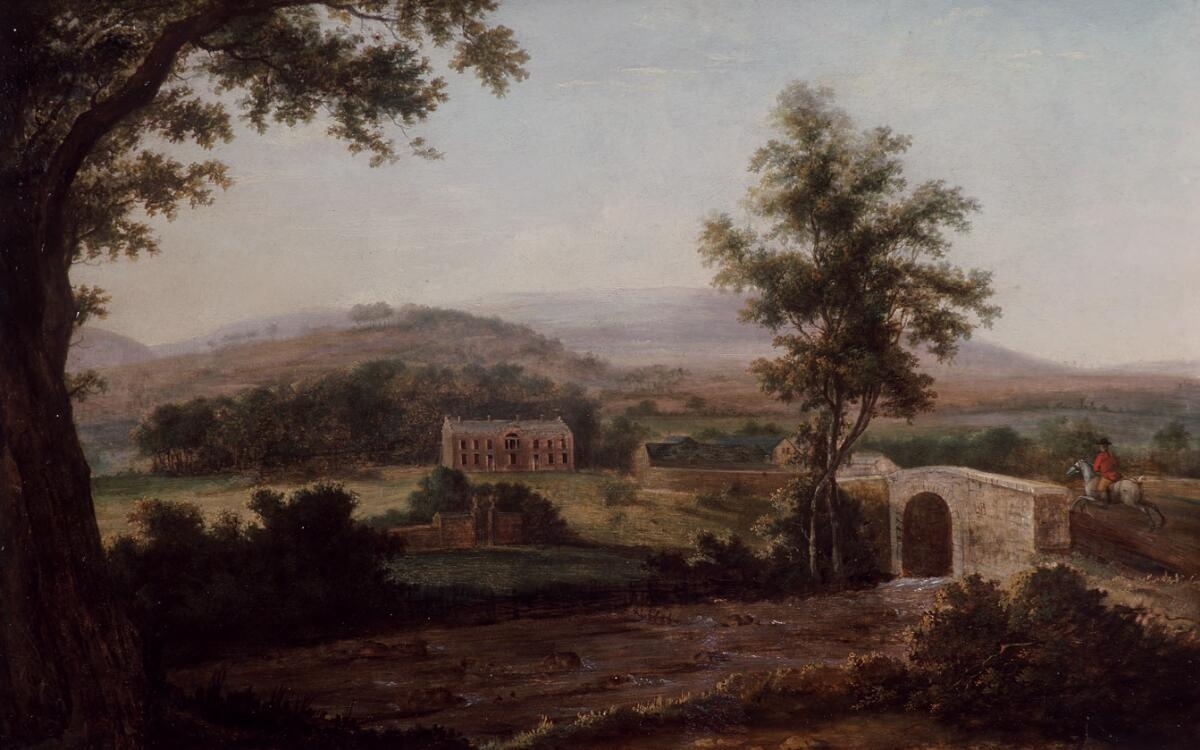
Aberpergwm Manor c.1790

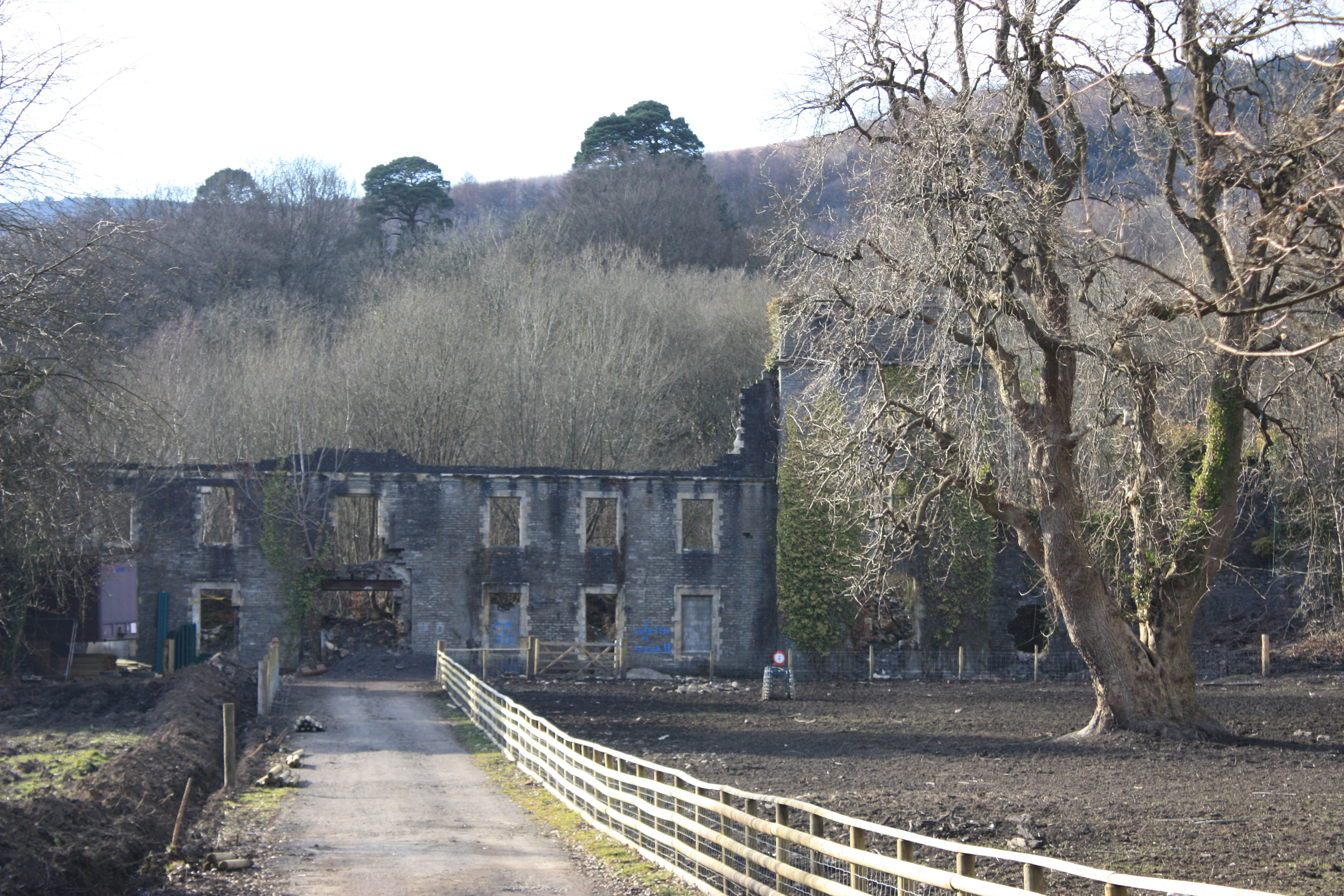
The remains of Aberpergwm House, March 2010

Aberpergwm House (Welsh: Aberpergwm) is an abandoned and ruinous country house located in Glynneath, Wales. Within the grounds of the house sits the church of St. Cadoc, which is possibly of late medieval origin.

== Origins ==
The present house is a remodelling of an older house known as Neuadd Pergwm. The house came into the ownership of the Williamses of Blaen Baglan in around 1560. It is said that Oliver Cromwell was related, and so the house was saved from pillage during the English Civil War. The Williams family were one of the few Welsh gentry families to remain faithful to the Welsh language. The family's London residence was at Stratford Place.

== Remodelling ==
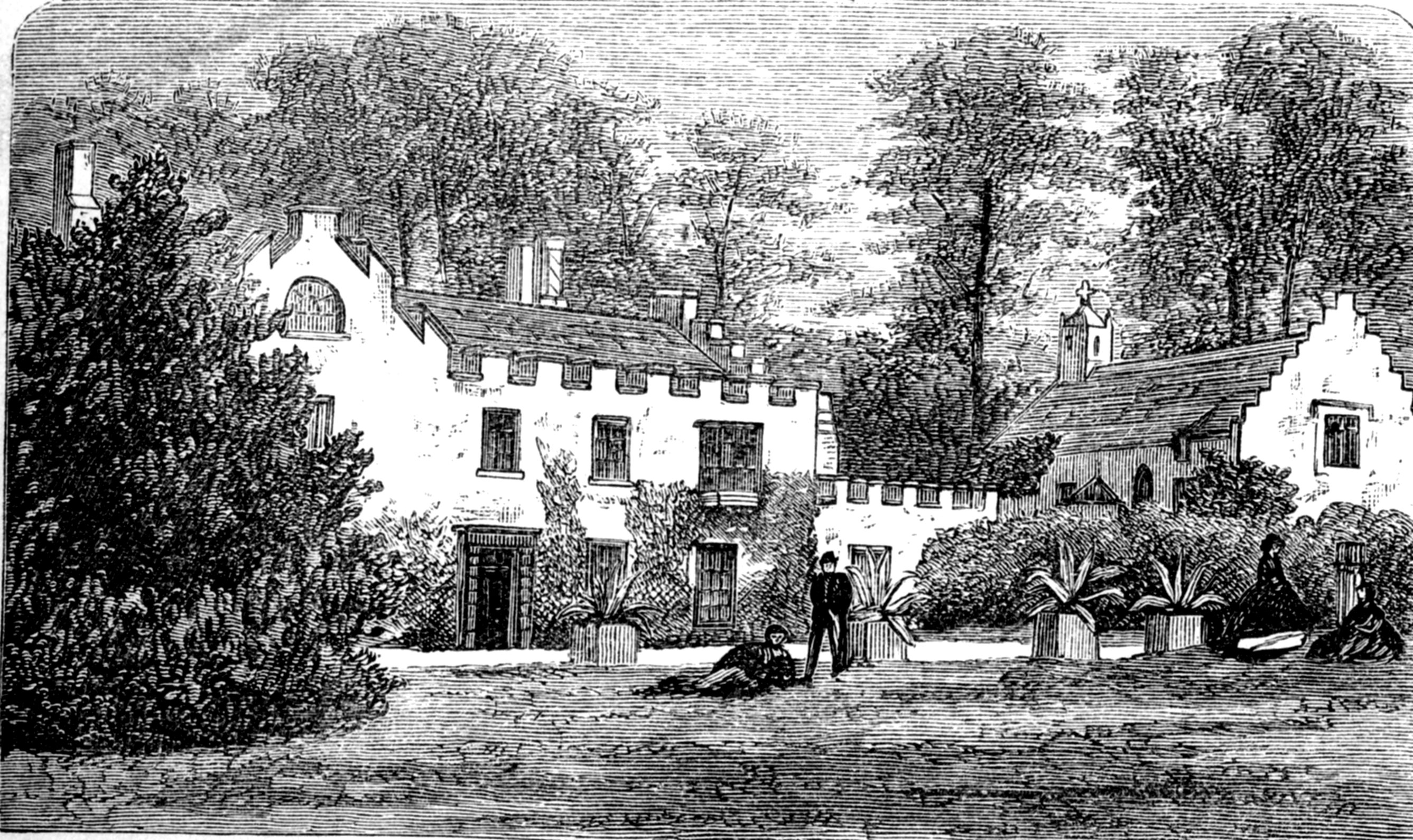
Aberpergwm House before the 1876 remodelling

By 1850, the house was ‘playfully crenellated’ with a central pediment” In 1876, the house was remodelled by Morgan Stuart Williams, who later went on to restore St Donat's Castle This ‘overwhelmed’ the work of 1850, and included the addition of a new front range dominated by a ‘remarkable top heavy Elizabethan gallery across the whole front’ of 94 feet. The gallery was added in the spirit of the ancient Glamorgan halls, such as Llantrithyd Place. A further castellated wing was added along the hill.

In 1868, Williams had rejected earlier plans by John Norton for a new house in Gothic style with a tower. Williams, by rejecting Norton’s Victorian High Gothic appeared to be playing safe. An elaborate central door surround (now missing) could be a 17th-century Jacobean survival, or may be a convincing replica. The house is built of Pennant Sandstone with Bath stone dressings.

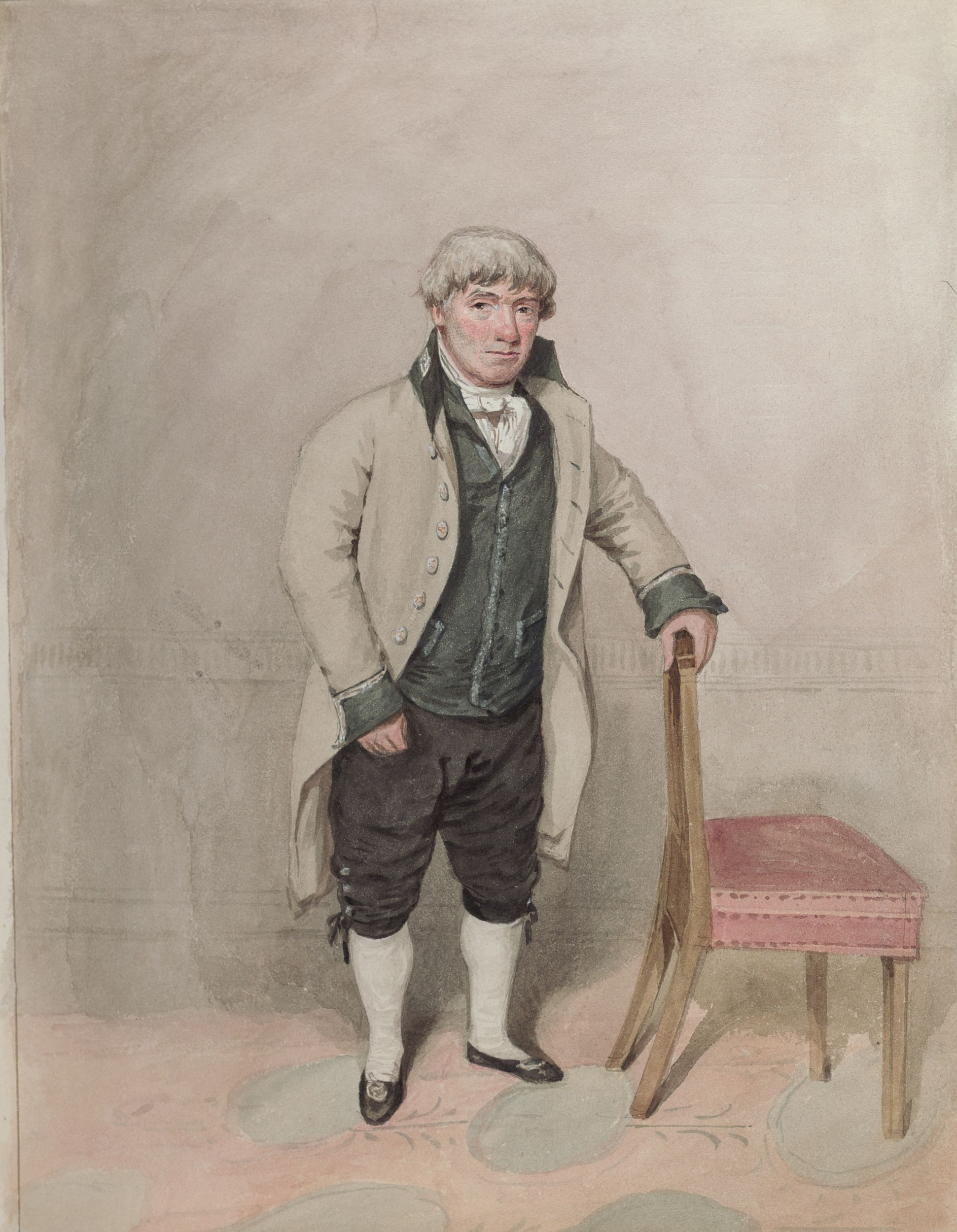
'Old John', a servant at Aberpergwm in 1818

== Later use and fire ==
The East Anglian School for Deaf and Blind Children at Gorleston-on-Sea in Norfolk was evacuated to the house in the summer of 1940 because of its vulnerable position on the east coast of England during the Second World War. For the rest of the war the school was based in Aberpergwm House.

After the war the house was leased to the National Coal Board and used as offices; the surrounding park land was mined for coal. At some time the house finally suffered a disastrous fire, and was not rebuilt. The 1876 gallery on the third storey has since collapsed leaving a seven-bay front of two storeys, with a small part surviving of the third. The house was finally abandoned during the 1990s. Some of the medieval tracery from the original house has since been reincorporated into Penhow Castle.

The house is still owned by the Williams Family. Part of the Williams family remained in Wales until 2015 living in Llanharan House.

== Cultural importance ==
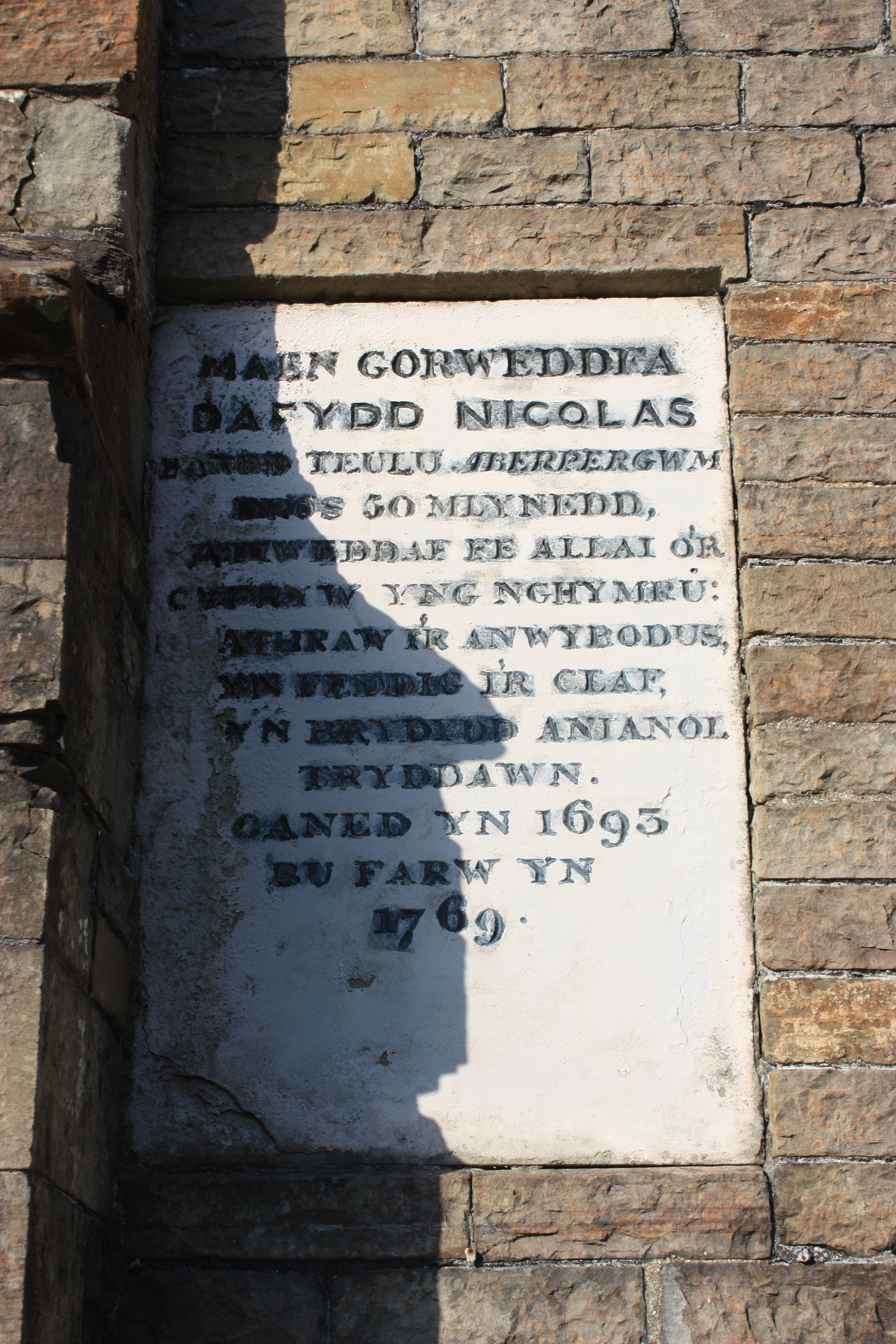
Memorial to Dafydd Nicolas, St. Cadoc's Church, Aberpergwm

The family are descendants of the last native ruler of Kingdom of Morgannwg Iestyn ap Gwrgant. In the fifteenth century, Aberpergwm House was the home of Rhys ap Siancyn and his descendants, the most prominent of the poets’ patrons in Glamorgan during the period. Dafydd Nicolas, a Williams family descendant, was among the last of the Welsh household bards and the folksong collector Maria Jane Williams was a member of the family. Her older brother, Rees Williams, was involved in establishing the Bank of Williams and Rowland. The Williams family motto: 'A ddioddefws a orfu' ('He who suffers triumphs', in English) became the motto of Glamorgan County Council.

The family had strong political links with Liberal Party MP Sir Rhys Rhys-Williams was a member of the family, as was Conservative Party MP and MEP Sir Brandon Rhys-Williams. Nicholas Cayzer, Baron Cayzer shipping magnate and member of The House of Lords married into the family as did Conservative MP Michael Colvin.

The house is listed Grade II by Cadw and is undergoing extensive building work to conserve its important historical contents and structure. The ornate wrought iron gates in the driveway are separately listed as Grade II, and the church, which is being restored, is Grade II* listed.
