= St Cadoc's Church, Glynneath =

Coordinates: 51.7426°N 3.6383°W

St. Cadoc's Church
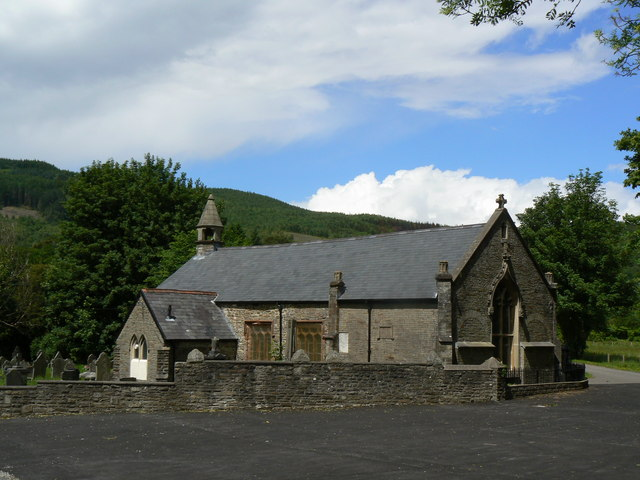
- St. Cadoc's Church
- Location: Glynneath
- Country: Wales
- Denomination: Anglican
- Website: parish.churchinwales.org.uk/l351/churches-en/st-cadocs_-en/

History
- Dedication: Cadoc

Architecture
- Heritage designation: Grade II* listed
- Years built: 1808–1841

Administration
- Diocese: Llandaff
- Parish: Vale of Neath

Clergy
- Vicar: A. J. Davies

St. Cadoc's Church is a Church in Wales church in Glynneath, Wales. It is located in the grounds of the now derelict Aberpergwm House for which it was an estate church.

== History ==
Possibly of late-medieval origin, the church was a 17th-century chapel of ease in the parish of Cadoxton. It was rebuilt in 1808–09 by Rees Williams of Aberpergwm House and remodelled and extended by his son William Williams in 1836–41, when the chancel was added. It was repaired and further modified in 1883.

The church was restored in 2001 with further repairs and conservation of the stained glass in 2011.

== Architecture ==
Rectangular in form, the church is built from Pennant sandstone with a slate roof and an octagonal bellcote. The window frames in the north and south walls are of red Cheshire sandstone and probably date from 1883.

Inside are Georgian white plaster walls and vaulted ceilings and a neo-Norman chancel arch.

== Stained glass ==
The east window contains four stained glass panels dating from 1530–1542 which originate from Steinfeld Abbey near Cologne, from which they were removed following the secularisation of the abbey in 1802. A stained glass window in the north wall dates from 1882.

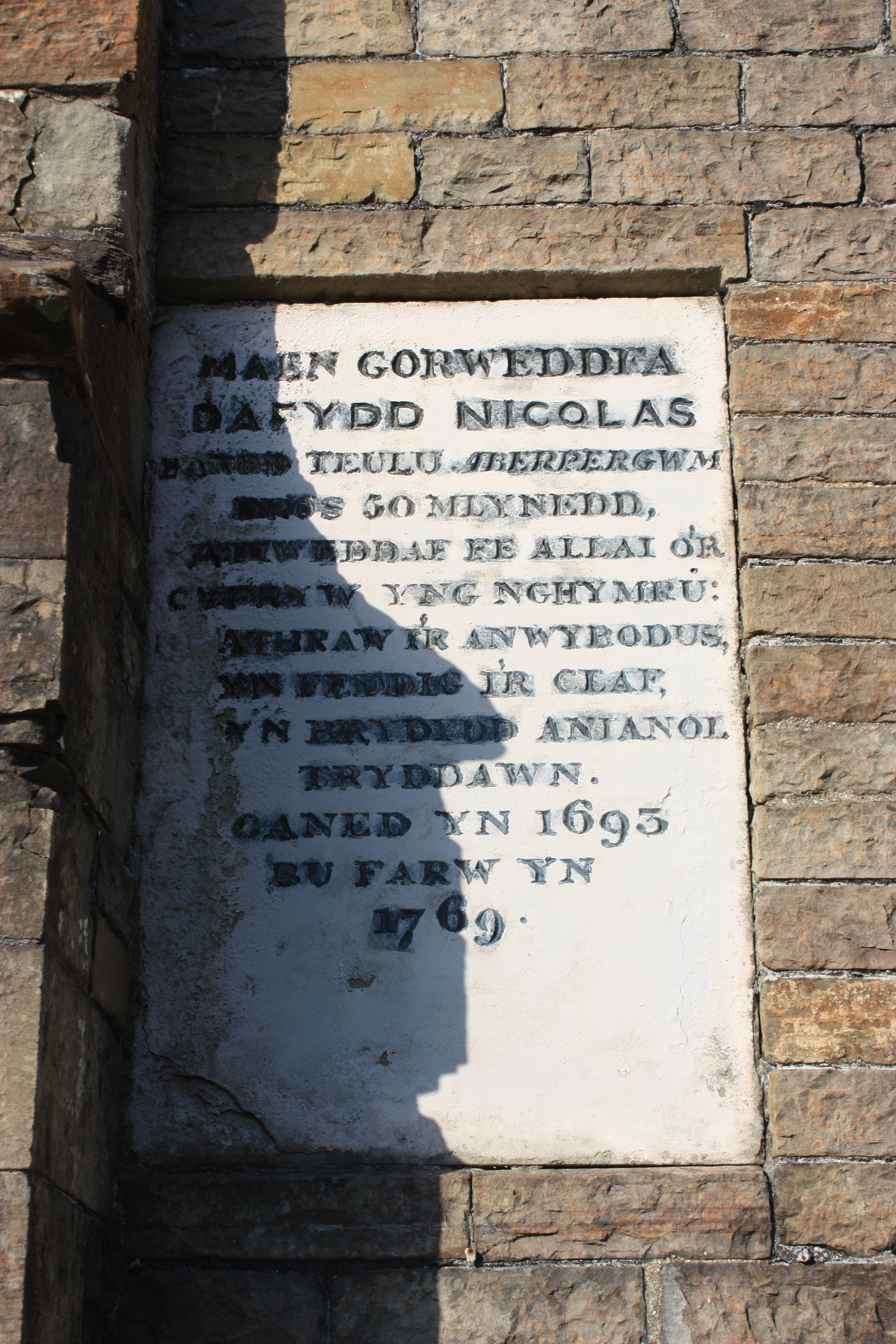
Memorial to the bard Dafydd Nicolas (1705–1774) (incorrect dates on memorial)

== Monuments and memorials ==
The two medieval effigies in the chancel are said to have been purchased in France to enhance the antique effect. There are several memorials to members of the Williams family, including an elaborate memorial in the graveyard known locally as the Wedding Cake Memorial.

There is a memorial tablet to Dafydd Nicolas (1705–1774), bard at Aberpergwm House, who was among the last of the Welsh household bards.
