= River Neath =

Coordinates: 51°37′N 3°50′W

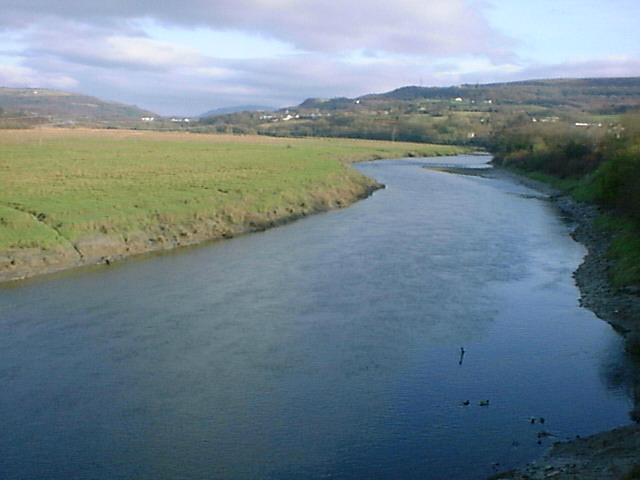
- The river near to Neath Castle, looking upstream.
- Native name: Afon Nedd (Welsh)

Location
- Country: United Kingdom, Wales
- Region: South Wales
- County: Neath Port Talbot
- Settlements: Pontneddfechan, Glyn-neath, Resolven, Neath

Physical characteristics
- Source
  - location: Pontneddfechan, Powys, Wales
- Length: 30.6 km (19.0 mi)
- Discharge
  - location: Baglan Bay

Basin features
- Tributaries
  - left: Melincourt Brook, Clydach Brook
  - right: River Dulais, River Clydach

River Neath (Welsh: Afon Nedd) is a river in south Wales running south west from the point at which its headwaters arising in the Brecon Beacons National Park converge to its mouth at Baglan Bay below Briton Ferry on the east side of Swansea Bay.

== Course ==
=== Upper tributaries ===
The rivers Nedd Fechan, Mellte and Hepste rise in south Powys on the southern slopes of Fforest Fawr. This headwater area is formed from Old Red Sandstone. Each then crosses a band of Carboniferous Limestone before traversing country formed by interlayered sandstones and shales traditionally referred to as the Millstone Grit. Within the limestone belt, short sections of each river flow underground, though that of the Hepste also flows at the surface during periods of particularly wet weather.

The steep descent of these rivers towards the Vale of Neath, and also of the Afon Pyrddin and Afon Sychryd, tributaries of the Nedd Fechan and Afon Mellte respectively, involves the development of a number of waterfalls over resistant bands of sandstone within the Millstone Grit. This is the core of an area which has come to be known as Waterfall Country (Welsh: Bro'r Sgydau).

=== Main river ===
The Mellte and the Nedd Fechan converge at Pontneddfechan, from which point the combined waters are known as the River Neath. It flows past Glynneath and on through the Vale of Neath, a long straight valley excavated along the Neath Disturbance by a glacier into Coal Measures rocks during a series of ice ages. Downstream of Pontneddfechan the river has few significant tributaries; the largest is the River Dulais which has its source north of Seven Sisters. As the Dulais nears the Neath it descends the Aberdulais Falls, a popular tourist attraction owned and managed by the National Trust and the site of an old tinworks. Close by the river flows past the once grand estate of Ynysygerwn. A smaller tributary, the River Clydach, flows southward through the village of Bryncoch to join the Neath at Neath Abbey. Other tributaries include the Melincwrt Brook and the Clydach Brook.

The River Neath provides water to two canals, the Neath Canal and the Tennant Canal. At Aberdulais basin, both canals meet, the Tennant Canal crossing the River Neath by means of an aqueduct. Also crossing the river here is the Vale of Neath Railway line and the A465 road. As it approaches the town of Neath the river passes the ancient church of Saint Illtud at Llantwit. Further on it loops around the former workhouse at Llety Nedd and skirts Penydre. Here it passes close to the Norman castle, visited by King Henry II, King John and King Edward I.

As it meanders around the town of Neath it passes the remains of the Roman fort Nidum at Cwrt Herbert and the Cistercian monastic foundation of Neath Abbey. Its monks used their access to the river to challenge the trading rights of the burgesses of the town of Neath.

The estuary of the River Neath extends from Neath town down past Briton Ferry to the sea next to Jersey Marine Beach. The estuary is partly industrialised with a ship breaking yard, a large local authority waste disposal site and wharves at Melincryddan, Briton Ferry and Neath Abbey. Where it remains undisturbed, there are areas of salt marsh stretching from Neath to Baglan Bay and Crymlyn Burrows which are of great ecological value.

== Etymology ==
The modern English name ultimately derives from "Nedd" the original Welsh name for the river. In common with most hydronymy in Western Europe, the name is known to be Celtic or Pre-Celtic, however its etymology remains uncertain. A meaning of shining or brilliant has been suggested, as has a link to the older Indo-European root *-nedi, simply meaning 'river'.

The name probably shares its etymology with the town of Stratton in Cornwall (originally named Strat-Neth) and the River Nidd in Northern England. This river is now known as the River Strat (by back formation from Stratton).

== Gallery ==
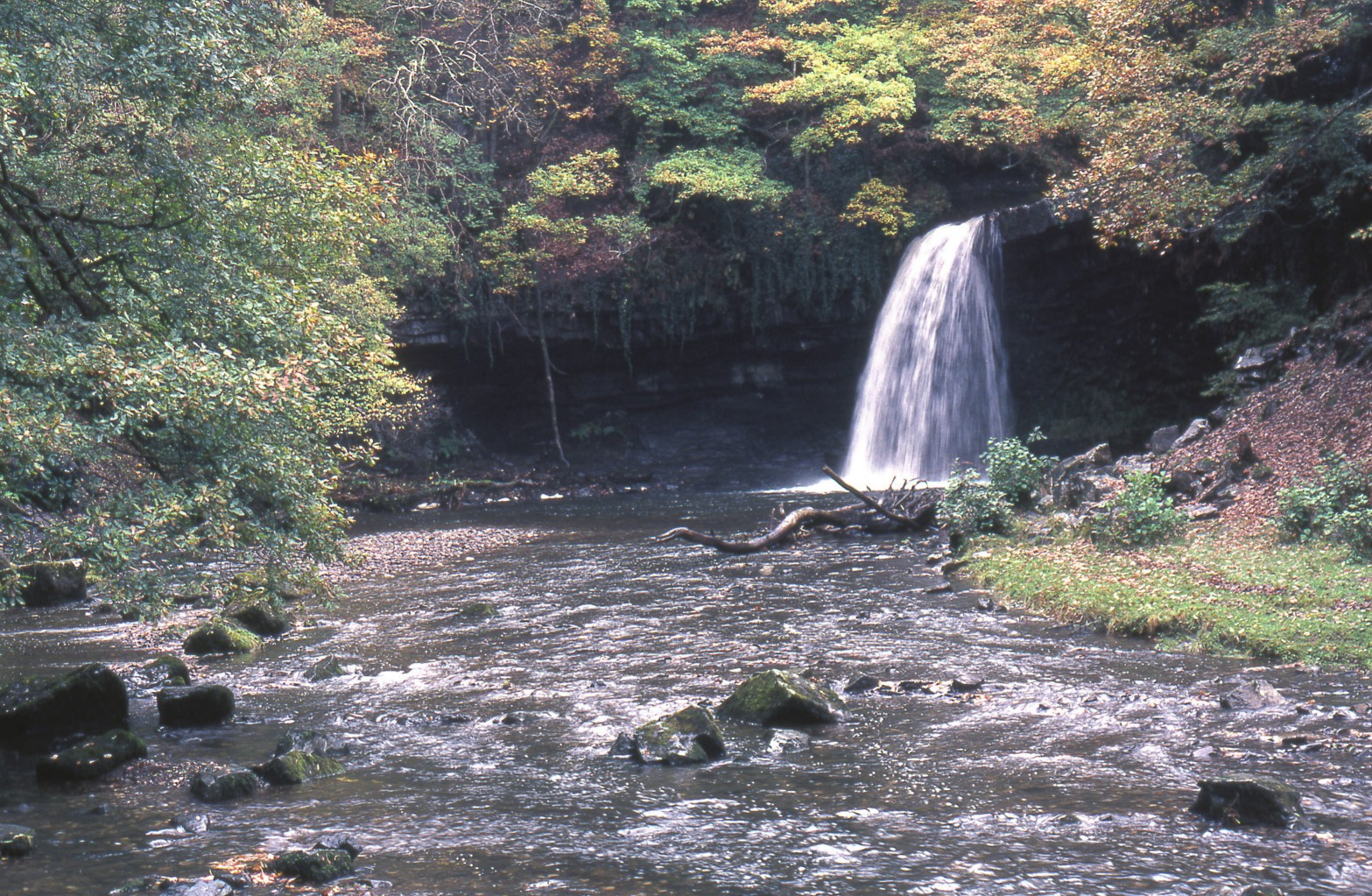
Sgwd Gwladus waterfall on the Afon Pyrddin, a tributary of the Neath

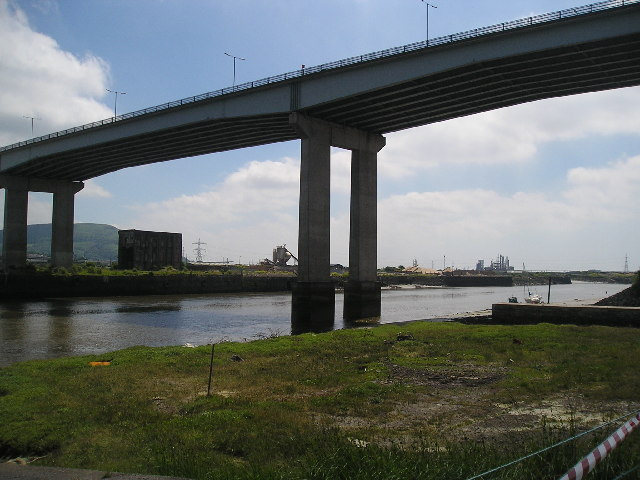
M4 over River Neath
