= Mynydd y Drum =

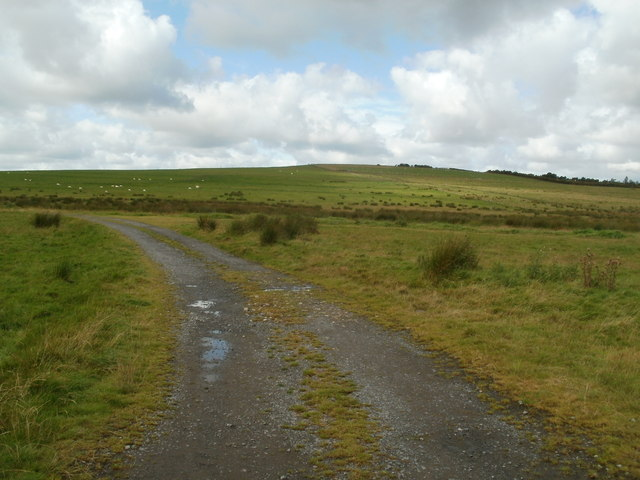
- Mynydd y Drum, viewed from the east

Highest point
- Elevation: 298 m (978 ft)
- Prominence: 93.4 m (306 ft)
- Coordinates: 51.774°N 3.730°W

Geography
- Location: Neath Port Talbot, Wales
- OS grid: SN807098

Mynydd y Drum is a hill on the border between the unitary authorities of Powys and Neath Port Talbot, south Wales. The summit of the hill is in Neath Port Talbot (the traditional county of Glamorgan) at 298 metres (978 feet) and lies towards the western end of a broad curving ridge, the larger part of which is in Powys (traditional county of Brecknockshire). The eastern half of the hill is currently being opencasted for coal. The hill is sometimes referred to simply as The Drum (a Welsh word, so pronounced 'drim').

== Geology ==
The hill is formed from sandstones and mudstones of the South Wales Coal Measures which also contain numerous coal seams currently being worked within the large Nant Helen Opencast Coal Mine.

== Archaeology and industrial archaeology ==
Several cairns of unknown age are found around the summit plateau though that formerly known as Garn Goch has been obliterated by the opencasting. The remains of numerous nineteenth century tramroads are scattered around the flanks of the hill, notably that of Claypon's Tramroad extension, one of the later parts of the Brecon Forest Tramroad linking Onllwyn with Ystalyfera in the Swansea Valley.

== Access ==
Other than the area being opencasted, much of the hill is designated as open country and therefore available for walkers to wander over at will. Various public footpaths and bridleways provide access over its lower slopes from the communities in the upper Swansea Valley such as Abercraf and Ystradgynlais and from Seven Sisters at the head of the Dulais valley to the southeast.

== Folklore ==
There is a legend that three cauldrons of gold are buried on the hill's summit, guarded by demons. There is a prophecy that the treasure will one day be claimed by a young girl.
