= River Dulais =

River in the United Kingdom

Coordinates: 51.68017°N 3.77801°W

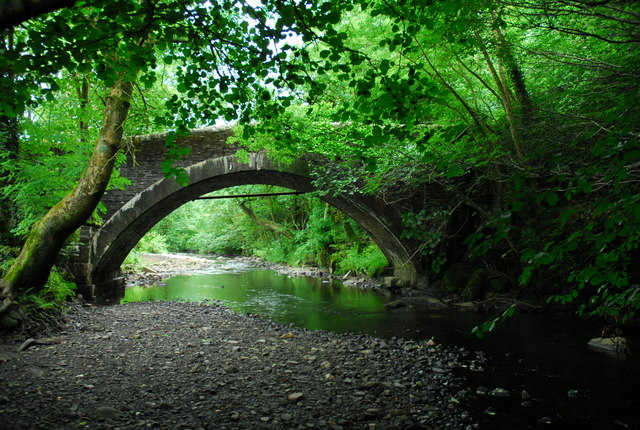
Stone bridge over the Dulais at Crynant

River Dulais (Welsh: Afon Dulais) is a river of Wales which has its source at Mynydd y Drum. It joins the River Neath after flowing over Aberdulais Falls.
