= Resolven =

Resolven: Welsh: Resolfen
- Location within Neath Port Talbot
- Population: 2,316
- OS grid reference: SN828025
- Principal area: Neath Port Talbot
- Preserved county: West Glamorgan
- Country: Wales
- Sovereign state: United Kingdom
- Post town: NEATH
- Postcode district: SA11
- Dialling code: 01639
- Police: South Wales
- Fire: Mid and West Wales
- Ambulance: Welsh
- UK Parliament: Neath and Swansea East
- Senedd Cymru – Welsh Parliament: Neath
- List of places UK Wales Neath Port Talbot 51.710°N 3.696°W Map of the community

Resolven (Welsh: Resolfen) is a small village and community in Neath Port Talbot county borough, Wales. It is located in the Vale of Neath.

== Location ==
The village is situated in the Vale of Neath, 8 miles (13 km) north east of the town of Neath, next to the A465 Heads of Valleys Road, and is the main settlement in the community of Resolven. Together with the community of Clyne and Melincourt, the village makes up the Resolven electoral ward. The community includes the settlements of Rheola, Abergarwed, and Ynysarwed.

== History and amenities ==
In the immediate surrounding areas there are a number of industrial sites, which have become somewhat run down during the 1980s and 1990s. The popular Rheola indoor market was located near the village on the site of an old industrial factory, but has since moved from Rheola and now resides in the old TRW Steering Systems building. The vacated site has plans to restore Rheola House and its estate buildings, and establish leisure and tourism facilities.

The larger surrounding area has much attractive countryside and a substantial wind farm above the village at Ffynnon Oer.

Resolven has played host to one of the best known stages of the Wales Rally GB for many years.

Resolven is host to Welsh Rugby Union affiliated team Resolven RFC.

Resolven is also host to Football Association Wales affiliated team Resolven AFC.

The Neath and Tennant Canal has been restored and now has over four miles of walkable towpath between Resolven and Glynneath. The Vale of Neath Railway is still used for freight transport between Neath and Cwmgwrach.

== Notable residents ==
- Sir Clifford Darby (1909–1992), geographer, was born in Resolven
- Peter Hain, Anti-Apartheid campaigner, MP and former cabinet minister
- Mel James, Welsh Rugby Union professional player
- Daniel Jervis, swimmer
- Debbie Llewellyn, originally from Resolven, was the Mayor of Gloucester for 2014–15
