= Vale of Neath =

Valley in Wales

Coordinates: 51.727°N 3.651°W

The Vale of Neath (or Neath Valley, Welsh: Cwm Nedd), one of the South Wales Valleys, encompasses the upper reaches of the River Neath in southwest Wales. In addition to the River Neath, it is traversed by the Neath Canal and the A465 dual carriageway.

Settlements in the valley include Neath, Cadoxton, Tonna, Aberdulais, Resolven, Blaengwrach, Glynneath and Pontneddfechan.

Coal mining was an industry in the valley with mining operations being located at Aberpergwm and Pentreclwydau near Glynneath.

== Waterfall Country ==
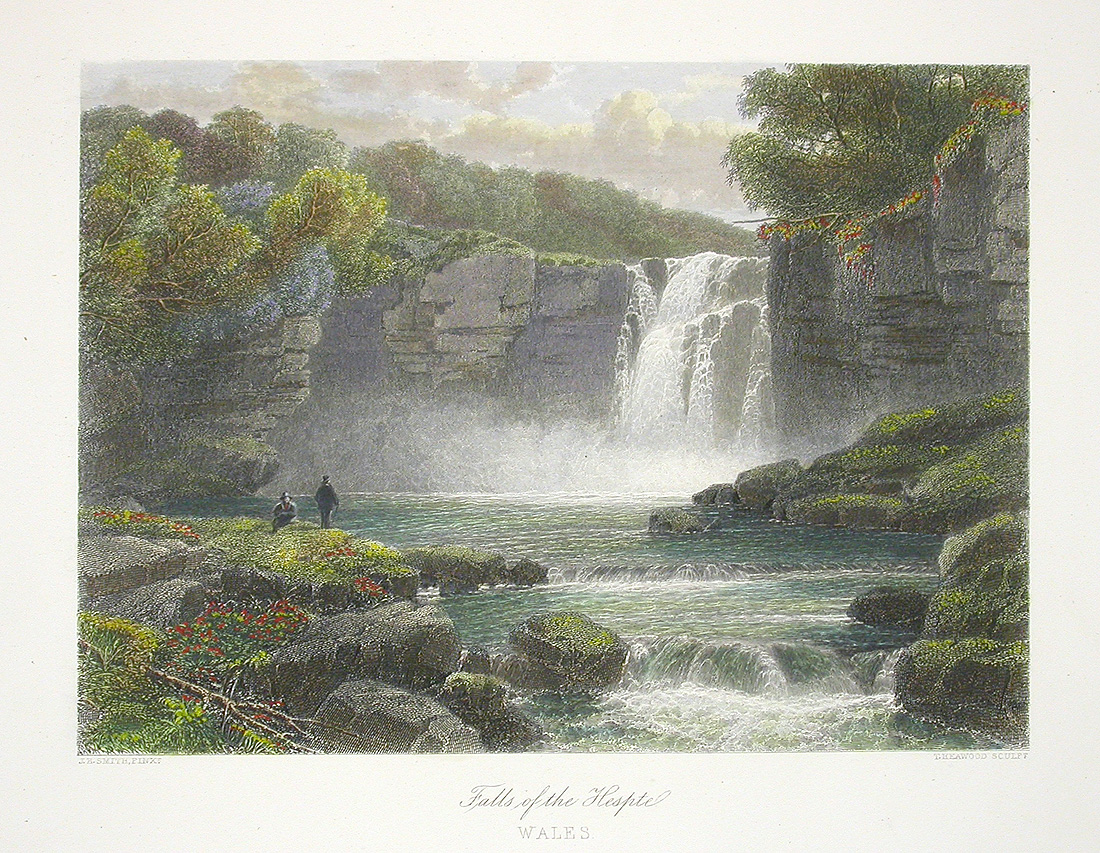
Falls of the Afon Hepste, Wales - "Picturesque Europe"

"Waterfall Country" is a nickname given to the Vale of Neath due to the diverse number of waterfalls in the valley. In the upper reaches of the valley, at the foothills of the Brecon Beacons, are the waterfalls of four or five rivers: the Afon Hepste, Nedd Fechan, Afon Pyrddin, Afon Mellte and Afon Sychryd. In the lower valley, waterfalls can be found at Melincourt and Aberdulais.

Partly in recognition of the above, the 19th century naturalist Alfred Russel Wallace said of the Vale of Neath; "I cannot bring to mind a single valley that in the same extent of country comprises so much beautiful and picturesque scenery and so many interesting features as the Vale of Neath."

== Vale of Neath Railway ==
Currently partly used as a goods line, the Vale of Neath Railway once served the area for passenger trains.
