= Glynneath =

Glynneath: Welsh: Glyn-nedd
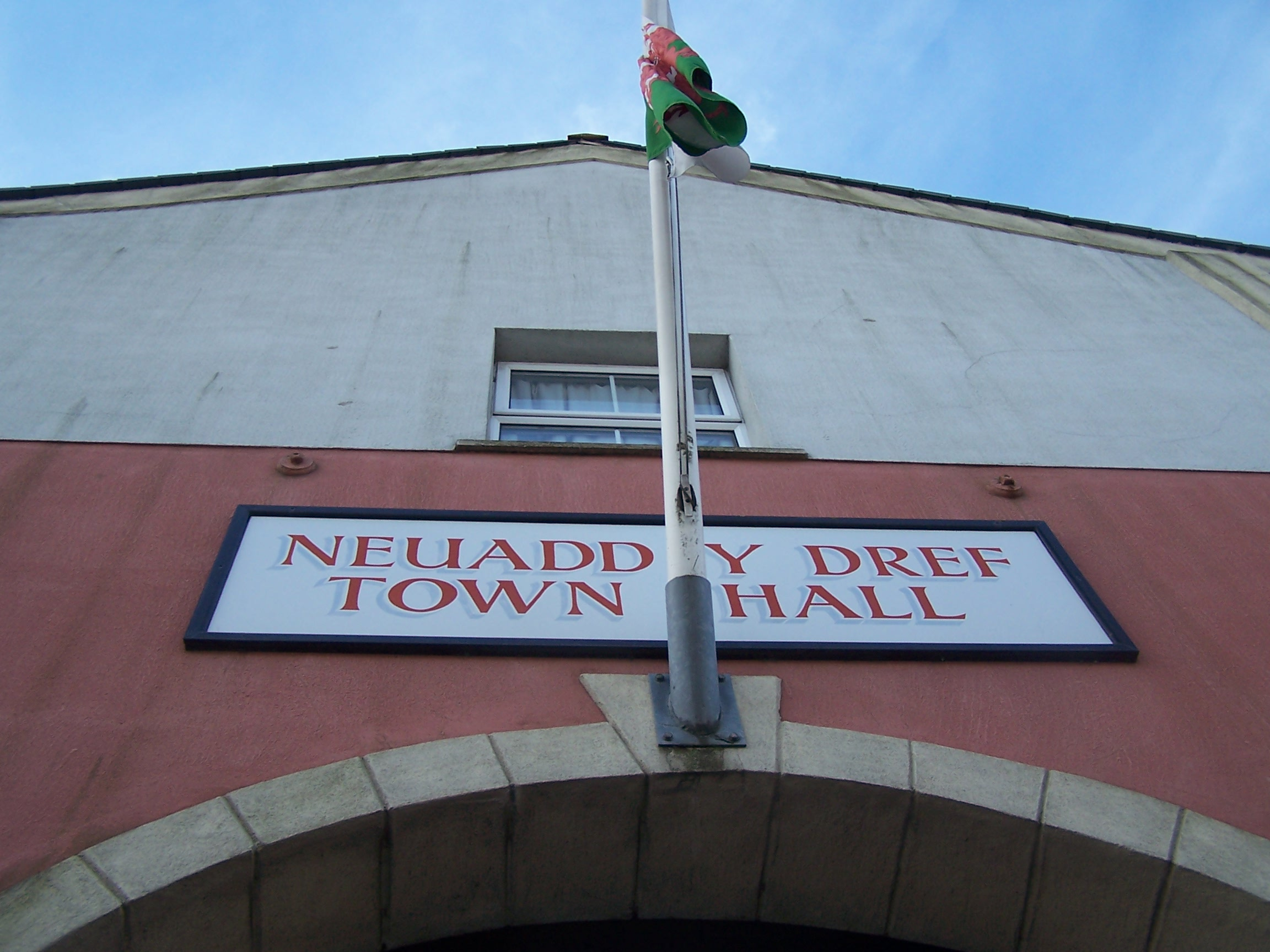
- Glynneath Town Hall

- Location within Neath Port Talbot
- Population: 4,278 (2011)
- OS grid reference: SN885067
- Community: Glynneath
- Principal area: Neath Port Talbot
- Preserved county: West Glamorgan
- Country: Wales
- Sovereign state: United Kingdom
- Post town: NEATH
- Postcode district: SA11
- Dialling code: 01639
- Police: South Wales
- Fire: Mid and West Wales
- Ambulance: Welsh
- UK Parliament: Neath and Swansea East
- Senedd Cymru – Welsh Parliament: Neath
- List of places UK Wales Neath Port Talbot 51.747°N 3.617°W Map of the community

Glynneath (Welsh: Glyn-nedd 'valley of the River Neath'; also spelt Glyn-neath and Glyn Neath) is a town, community and electoral ward lying on the River Neath in the county borough of Neath Port Talbot, Wales. It was formerly in the historic county of Glamorgan. Glynneath ward covers only part of the community, with some 840 electors included in the neighbouring ward of Blaengwrach.

Industrialisation reached Glynneath when coal mining started in 1793, and rapidly expanded when the Neath Canal came to the town in 1775. Many features of the old canal still survive to the present time.

There are waterfalls to the north east at Pontneddfechan near the Brecon Beacons and large parts of the rural area are heavily forested.

== Notable buildings and structures ==
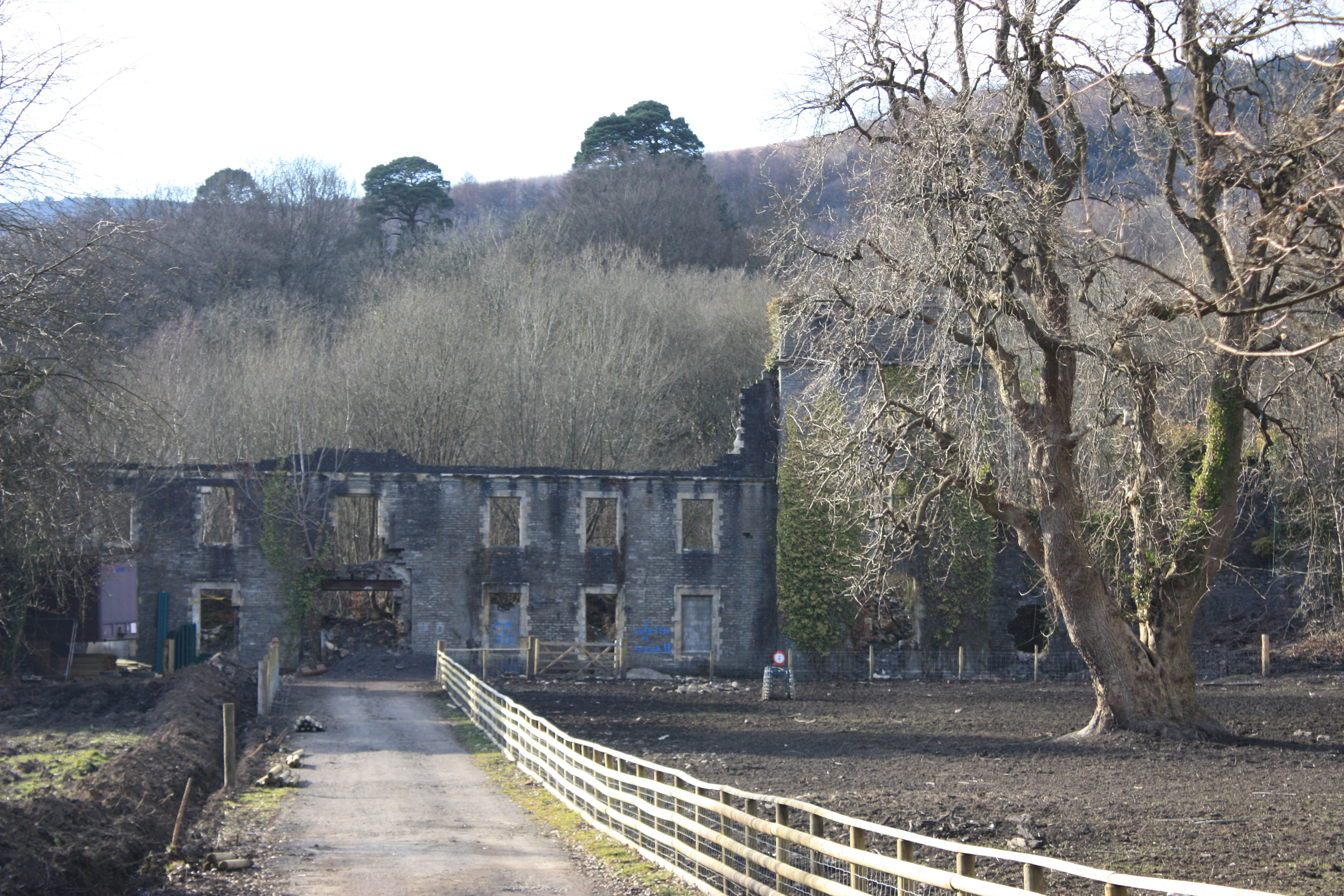
The ruins of the Grade II listed Aberpergwm House

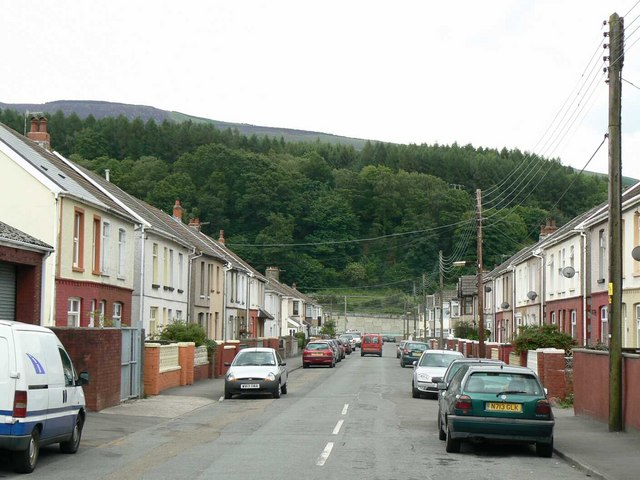
Godfrey Avenue in Glynneath

Glynneath is home to the ruins of Aberpergwm House. Once owned by Rhys ap Siancyn, Aberpergwm House became the home of the Williams family, Welsh gentry with a strong tradition of using the Welsh language over English. Their descendants include the last of the Welsh household bards Dafydd Nicolas and folksong collector Maria Jane Williams. The Williams' family motto y ddioddefws y orfu (He who suffers, triumphs) was adopted by Glamorgan County Council. The mansion itself was remodelled in 1876 but is now derelict and little of note remains of the building.

St. Cadoc's Church, in the grounds of Aberpergwm House, was built as a chapel in the 17th century, rebuilt in 1808-1809 for the Aberpergwm Williams family and extended in 1836–41. It is a Grade II* listed building.

Rheola House, a Regency house designed c.1812 by the eminent architect John Nash, is also Grade II* listed.

Glynneath Town Hall is a regularly used civic building situated at Heathfield Avenue. It is owned and managed by Glynneath Town Council.

The Grade II* listed Bethania Community Centre on the High Street is an example of an early Calvinistic Methodist chapel with well detailed external frontage in contrasting stone and iron work railings. The interior has good examples of very finely detailed woodwork.

A bronze statue of the singer Max Boyce, who was born in the town, was erected in the High Street, in September 2023, in recognition of Boyce's 80th birthday.

== Sports and leisure ==
Glynneath used to host one of motor sport's most important challenges, the British round of the World Rally Championship (formerly known as the Lombard RAC rally or Rally GB). Some of the biggest names in motor sport have taken part and have failed to complete the British round.

Glynneath also has an association with downhill mountain biking with the Welsh National Championships being held at Rheola.

Glynneath is home to Glynneath RFC, a rugby union club founded in 1889.

Glynneath also boasts an active football club named Glynneath Town A.F.C. and a well attended tennis club. Until recently, Glynneath Bowls Club, in particular the Ladies' Bowls Club was an active group.

Glynneath Leisure Centre, maintained through Celtic Leisure is situated just off of Chain Road.

== Notable residents ==
- The Anchoress, musician, was born in the town.
- Max Boyce, comedian and singer, closely linked to Welsh rugby culture.
- Julie Gardner, television producer, responsible for the successful relaunch of Doctor Who.
- Leslie Hardman, British Army chaplain and rabbi, who was among the liberators of Bergen-Belsen concentration camp, was born in the town.
- Ruth Madoc, actress, best known for her role as Gladys Pugh in the television sitcom Hi-de-Hi!
- Siwan Morris, actress, who has appeared in the television series Belonging, Caerdydd, and Skins.
- Glyn Prosser; Glynneath RFC, Neath RFC, Wales rugby union & Huddersfield RLFC rugby league footballer.
- January Rees, Wales women's rugby union player, comedian
- Emlyn Walters, Bradford Northern and Wales rugby league footballer.

== Twin Town ==
Glynneath is twinned with Pont-Évêque, France, since 1993.

The town twinning supports football matches between the two towns, and a visit by Glynneath Male Voice Choir.
