= George W. Buck =

British civil engineer (1789–1854)

George Watson Buck (1789–1854) was the engineer of the Montgomeryshire Canal in the early 19th century, and was responsible for the unique lock paddle design.

He was later resident engineer during the building of the London and Birmingham Railway, and also designed Stockport Viaduct and the Dane Valley Viaduct on the Manchester and Birmingham Railway.

== Early life ==
Buck was born on 1 April 1789 at Stoke Holy Cross, near Norwich. His parents were Quakers and sent him, with his two brothers, to the Quaker School at Ackworth, West Yorkshire. With his schooling completed, his father placed him with a wholesaler at Tower Hill, London, as he wanted him to be involved in trade, but the position did not suit Buck, and so he looked for something else. Around 1807, the East London Waterworks Company were building Old Ford pumping station, which had been designed by Ralph Walker, and Buck managed to secure a job there. When the job was finished, Walker moved on to Farlington, to work on a water supply scheme for Portsmouth and Gosport. The scheme had been authorised by an Act of Parliament in 1809, and Buck went to work as resident engineer, reporting to Walker. The scheme suffered from an intermittent water supply, as did a competing scheme engineered by William Nicholson.

== Canal engineer ==
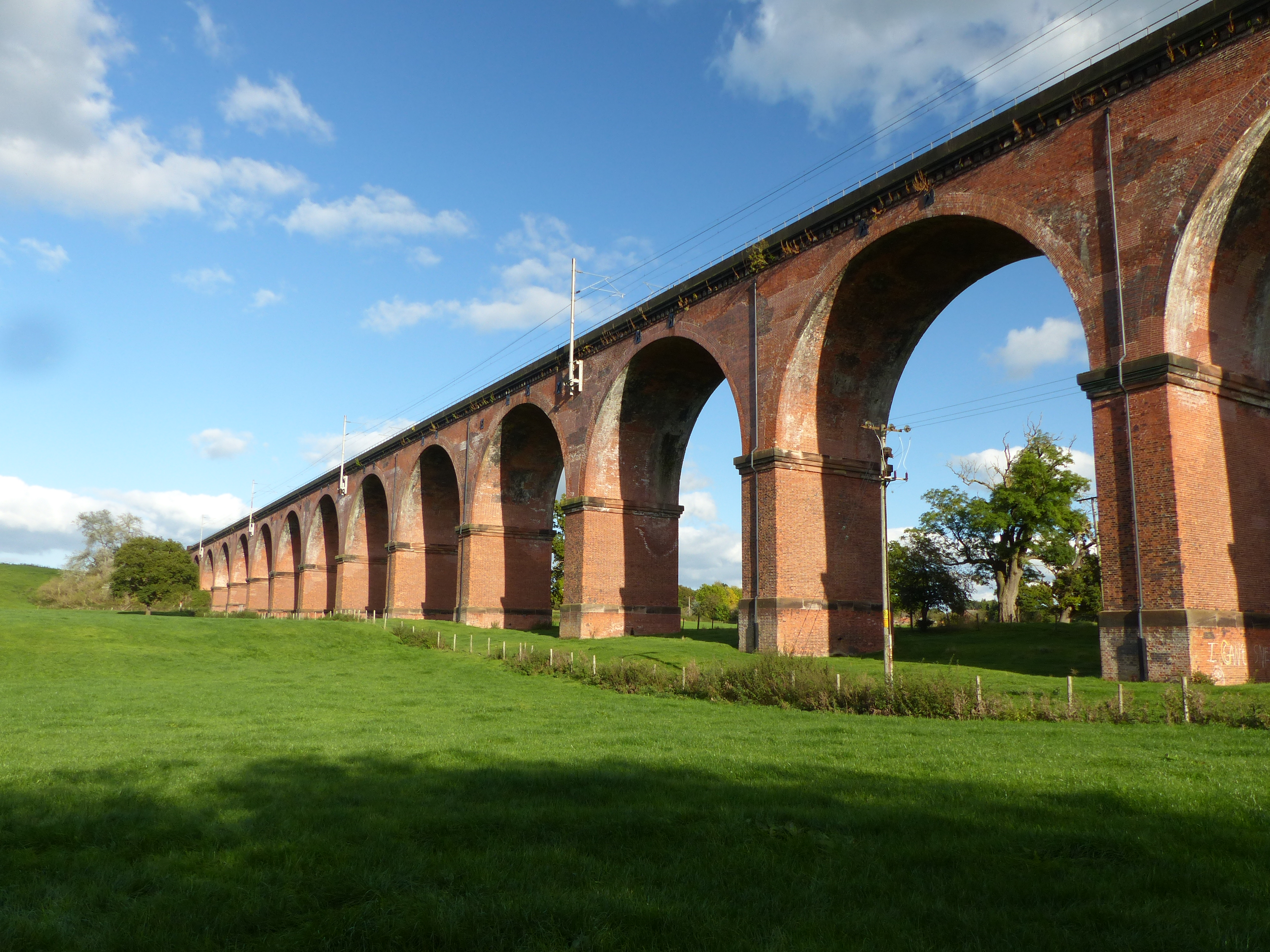
Twemlow viaduct over the River Dane built by Buck

Buck's next appointment was as engineer for the Eastern Branch of the Montgomeryshire Canal in 1819. The canal had been planned to run from the Ellesmere Canal at Carreghofa to Newtown, but construction had stopped at Garthmyl in 1797, due to a lack of funds. This section became known as the Eastern Branch. It had been built by John Dadford and his brother Thomas, both relatively inexperienced, but John had left for America before the project was completed, to be replaced by his father, also called Thomas Dadford. Construction of the rest of the line to Newtown, known as the Western Branch, and built by a company which was more or less independent, began in 1815, to the designs of Josias Jessop. The work was finished in 1819, although was not declared to be complete until December 1821.

There had been problems with some of the structures on the Eastern Branch during construction, although Jessop, when asked to comment, had suggested that such problems were quite usual. However, by the time Buck took up his position, the problems were obvious, and he embarked on a programme of reconstruction. First on the list was the Luggy Aqueduct at Brithdir, which was rebuilt with a cast iron trough in the year he started. Next he introduced lock gates built of the same material, and also used it for replacing some of the bridge beams. The aqueduct over the River Vyrnwy had failed during construction, when an arch collapsed, and by 1823, the masonry was distorted and bulging. Again, iron was Buck's material of choice, for he used wrought iron tie rods connected to cast iron facing plates to hold the structure together, with cast iron beams on the faces of the arches. Several of the aqueducts were also fitted with cast iron railings. In 1821 he designed the waterwheel used to pump water from the River Severn at Newtown to the top pound of the Western Branch, and introduced the distinctive lock paddle gear to the Eastern Branch in 1831. In December 1832 he was appointed engineer of the Western Branch as well, but moved on a year later.

== Railway engineer ==
In December 1833 Buck left canal employment to join Robert Stephenson's team building the London and Birmingham Railway. He already had some knowledge of railways, having visited the Stockton and Darlington Railway in 1828, and witnessed the Rainhill Trials in the following year. He was employed as a senior assistant engineer, and his salary reflected his obvious ability and experience. He had responsibility for the line from Camden Town to Tring, and was offered the post of resident engineer for the railway after the construction project was completed in 1837, but was not happy with the conditions, and moved on work on the Manchester and Birmingham Railway as Engineer-in-Chief. Among his achievements on that project were the Stockport and Dane viaducts. He travelled to Germany in 1840, to work on the Altona—Kiel Railroad, but he became ill and returned to England earlier than expected.

== Legacy ==
In 1839 he published a work entitled A Practical and Theoretical Essay on Oblique Bridges in which he was the first to apply trigonometry to the design of the skew arch railway bridge. It was used as a standard reference work on the subject until the early 20th century, its last reprinting being in 1895. He was an active member of the Institution of Civil Engineers from 1821. He was extremely busy during the railway mania years, but his health broke and he became deaf in the mid-1840s, retiring to the Isle of Man. He lived at Ramsey, and spent his time studying the Scriptures. He remained a close friend of Robert Stephenson, who supported him throughout. He died of scarlatina on 9 March 1854 and was buried at Maughold. His wife and a daughter died of the same disease within a fortnight.

Today a boat is named after him, which operates from Llanymynech Wharf on the Montgomery Canal.

== Bibliography ==
- Buck, George Watson (1839). A Practical and Theoretical Essay on Oblique Bridges (1st ed.). London: John Weale.
- Denton, John Horsley (1984). Montgomeryshire Canal and the Llanymynech Branch of the Ellesmere Canal. Lapal Publications. ISBN 0-9509238-1-8.
- Dobson, Edward (1849). A Rudimentary Treatise on Masonry and Stonecutting (1st ed.). London: John Weale. p. 29.
- Hadfield, Charles (1985). The Canals of the West Midlands. David and Charles. ISBN 0-7153-8644-1.
- Skempton, Sir Alec; et al. (2002). A Biographical Dictionary of Civil Engineers in Great Britain and Ireland: Vol 1: 1500 to 1830. Thomas Telford. ISBN 0-7277-2939-X.
