= Aberdare Canal =

Canal in Wales

Aberdare Canal / Camlas Aberdâr
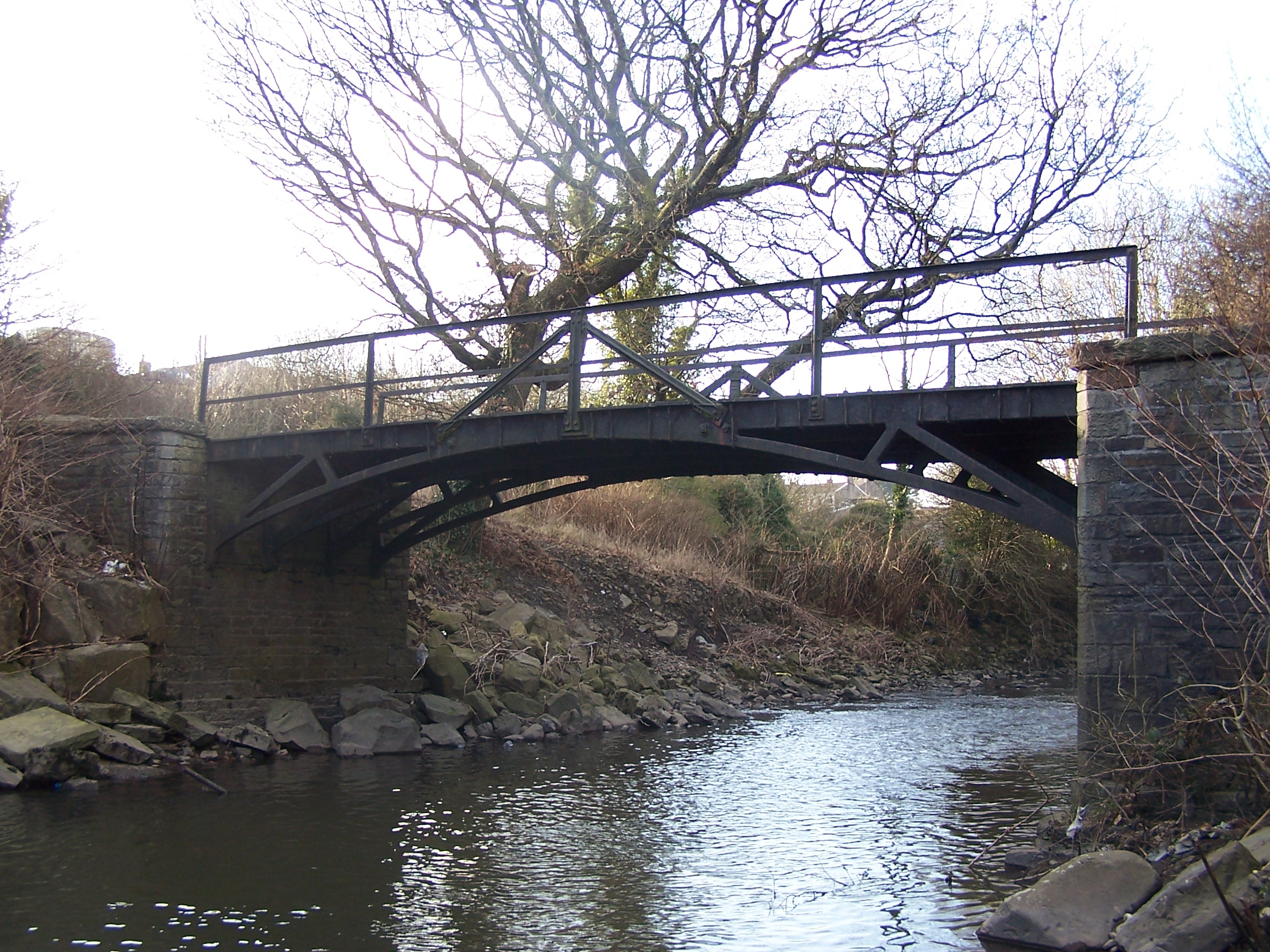
- The cast iron bridge of 1811 which carried the canal tramway over the Afon Cynon
- Interactive map of Aberdare Canal / Camlas Aberdâr

Specifications
- Locks: 2 (locks rise 13 ft)
- Status: Built over

History
- Original owner: Aberdare Canal Co
- Principal engineer: Thomas Sheasby junior
- Date of act: 1793
- Date of first use: 1812
- Date closed: 1900

Geography
- Start point: Aberdare; 51.7115°N 3.4312°W
- End point: Abercynon; 51.6496°N 3.3169°W
- Connects to: Glamorganshire Canal

The Aberdare Canal (Welsh: Camlas Aberdâr) was a canal in Glamorgan, Wales which ran from Aberdare to a junction with the Glamorganshire Canal at Abercynon. It opened in 1812 and served the iron and coal industries for almost 65 years. The arrival of railways in the area did not immediately affect its traffic, but the failure of the iron industry in 1875 and increasing subsidence due to coal mining led to it becoming uneconomic. The Marquess of Bute failed to halt its decline when he took it over in 1885, and in 1900 it was closed on safety grounds. The company continued to operate a tramway until 1944. Most of the route was buried by the construction of the A4059 road in 1923, although a short section at the head of the canal remains in water and is now a nature reserve. The company was wound up in 1955.

== History ==
Aberdare Canal Act 1793
- Act of Parliament
- Parliament of Great Britain
- Long title: An Act for making and maintaining a Navigable Canal from the Glamorganshire Canal, to or near the Village of Aberdare, in the County of Glamorgan; and for making and maintaining a rail-way or stone road from thence to or near Abernant, in the parish of Cadoxstone-juxta-Neath, in the said County.
- Citation: 33 Geo. 3. c. 95
- Territorial extent: Great Britain

Dates
- Royal assent: 18 March 1793
- Commencement: 13 December 1792 (Note: Start of session.)
Other legislation
Relates to	Aberdare Railway Act 1845

Status: Current legislation

Text of statute as originally enacted

By the 1780s, industry in the area around Aberdare was developing. John Maybery and Thomas Wilkins owned an ironworks at Hirwaun, which was leased by Anthony Bacon. He died in 1786, and the lease was taken over by Samuel Glover from Birmingham, who built a tramway. The nearby Neath Canal was authorised in 1791, and from its terminus at Glynneath, a tramway could be constructed to reach Hirwaun. Glover joined several others who were promoting the development of the Taff Valley, and plans for a branch canal from the Glamorganshire Canal to Aberdare, with feeder tramways, were conceived. Funds to survey a canal to link the Glamorganshire Canal to the Neath Canal were raised in 1792, and the canal engineer John Dadford surveyed a route for a road along the Aberdare Valley at the same time. Dadford presented evidence to a House of Commons Committee in February 1793, and to the House of Lords in early March. The Aberdare Canal Company was incorporated by an act of Parliament, the Aberdare Canal Act 1793 (33 Geo. 3. c. 95) obtained on 28 March 1793, which authorised the company to build a canal from Aberdare to Abercynon (at the time called Navigation) and a railway from Aberdare to Glynneath, on the Neath Canal. The act also empowered the company to build tramroads to any mines, quarries or works within 8 miles (13 km) of the route of the canal and railway. To complete this task, it had powers to raise an initial £22,500, and a further £11,000 if required. A turnpike road from Abercynon to Glynneath via Aberdare was authorised on the same day.

Although construction of the canal was authorised, it was not deemed to be viable at the time, as the Hirwaun Ironworks was the only potential user. Instead, James Dadford was employed to survey a route for a tramway which would run from Aberdare to Penderyn via Hirwaun. The track used edge rails, similar to modern railway lines, and consequently trucks with flanged wheels. The tramway linked a colliery, a limestone quarry and an ironworks. The company leased some limestone quarries at Penderyn, and conveyed the stone along the tramway to the Hirwaun Ironworks and to their own lime kilns. The route of the canal was re-surveyed in 1800 by Dadford's brother, Thomas, but with the opening of two further ironworks by 1806, the company finally resolved to build the canal at a meeting held in September 1809. Edward Martin from Morriston was employed to re-survey the route, which was completed by 9 January 1810, and Thomas Sheasby junior was employed as engineer.

Construction of the 6.75 miles (10.86 km) of canal began, with the Glamorganshire Canal Company agreeing to waiving tolls on all stone and lime cargoes which were for the new canal. Thomas Sheasby resigned as engineer in August 1811, and was replaced by George Overton, who worked for two days each week. The canal level dropped by 13 ft (4m) over its length, and this was accommodated by building two locks, one at Cwmbach and the other at Dyffryn. A feeder from the Afon Cynon supplied water to the canal at Canal Head, an aqueduct carried the canal over Nant Pennar, and a stop lock was built at the bottom end, where the canal joined the Glamorganshire Canal just below lock 17. There was a dispute with Richard Blakemore, who owned the Pentyrch ironworks and the Melingriffith Tin Plate Works, and who wanted surplus water to be returned to the river, but he was ultimately ignored, and the water supplied the Glamorganshire Canal. The canal was open for traffic by May 1812, although some outstanding work was completed over the following months.

=== Trade ===
The four main carriers on the canal were given wharf space at Canal Head, Ty Draw, where four 80-foot (24 m) wharves were constructed and the Glamorganshire Canal Company also allocated them wharf space at the pound at Cardiff Sea Lock. Trade in iron began well, but a disastrous depression began in 1813, resulting in the bankruptcy of the Hirwaun and Abernant ironworks, and the Llwydcoed ironworks ceasing production. With no sources of income, the canal effectively closed, and the tramway to the Neath Canal was abandoned.

The economy began to recover in 1818, and William Crawshay leased the Hirwaun ironworks. Having reconstructed and expanded it, he gradually bought out the Aberdare Canal Company, to ensure the route for his goods, and owned 96% of the shares by 1826. Between 1823 and 1826, the banks were raised, in order to allow the capacity of boats to be increased from 20 tons to 25 tons. This was financed by selling eleven shares, with additional costs being met from revenue, with the result that no dividend was paid in 1826.

In 1837, the first pit for the extraction of steam coal was sunk at Abernant-y-Groes by Thomas Wayne and his family. Wayne had previously been the clerk for the canal company. An entrepreneur called Thomas Powell started another pit at Tyr Founder in 1840, and hit the Four Foot seam two years later. Fifteen more pits were sunk in the Cynon Valley between 1840 and 1853, and a number of basins and tramways were constructed to facilitate export of the coal. Thomas Powell negotiated the right to carry coal in boxes in the boats, as a way to reduce breakage and ease handling of the product, with the empty boxes not incurring tolls on the return journey.

With the increasing traffic, more water was needed, and the ponds on Hirwaun Common, which were owned by the Tappendens, were converted into a reservoir, covering 47 acres (19 ha), from which water was supplied to the canal via the Afon Cynon and the feeder at Canal Head. In 1845, the company decided to build a pumping engine at Tyr Founder, to supply water from the Afon Cynon to the canal just above Cwmbach lock. The Glamorganshire Canal Company were approached to share the cost, on the basis that they would benefit from the extra water, and they agreed to pay two thirds of the cost, providing that they owned the installation.

=== The coming of the railways ===
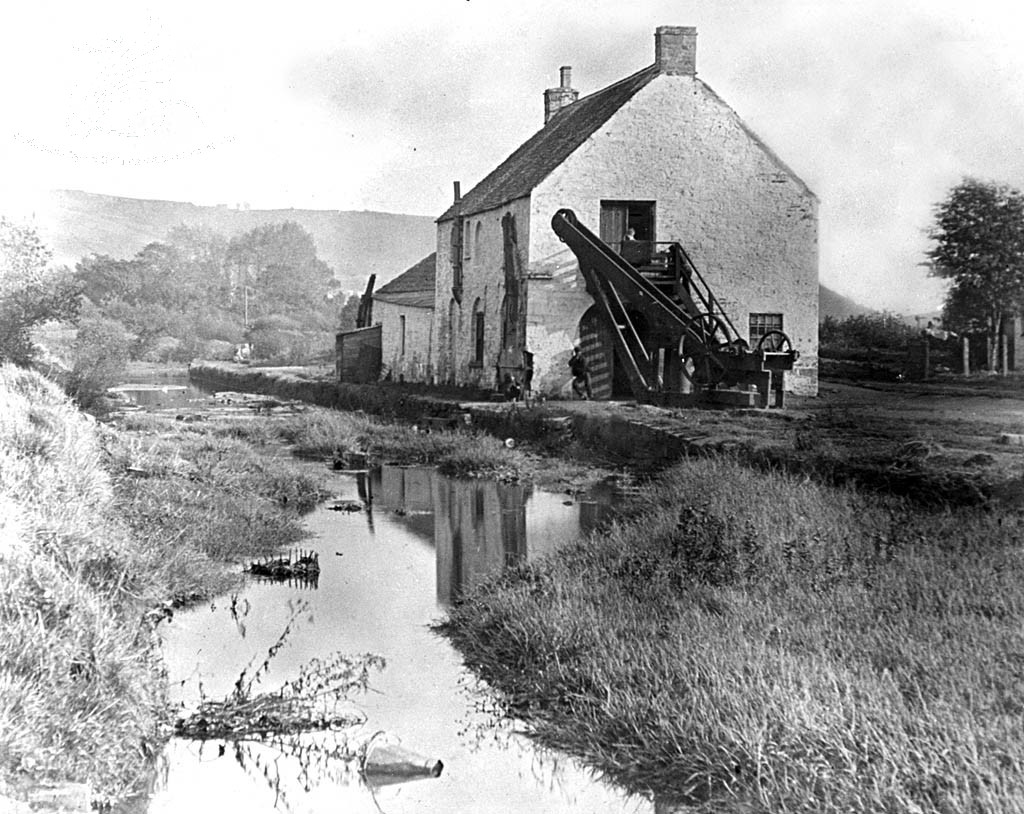
Aberdare Canal, c.1900

With the increasing coal production, railways were attracted to the area. The Aberdare Railway was the first in 1846, branching off from the Taff Vale Railway's line from Cardiff to Merthyr Tydfil at Abercynon, and running up the valley to Aberdare. Many of the collieries were linked to the railway by branch lines and sidings, but the canal company withheld consent to build bridges over the canal, and it was not until 1851 that a court ruling allowed the Wyrfa Coal Company to build the first, after which others followed. A second railway, the broad gauge Vale of Neath Railway, reached Aberdare in the same year. Despite the competition, the canal continued to carry a good volume of coal, rising from 159,653 tons in 1848 to 216,704 tons in 1858.

In 1864, the Great Western Railway built a line to Middle Duffryn (later renamed Mountain Ash), and further depleted the trade in coal on the canal. The iron trade collapsed in 1875, when the Aberdare ironworks stopped production due to a strike, and the canal was increasingly affected by subsidence, caused by mining, but was unable to get any compensation from the mine owners. In 1885, both the Aberdare Canal and the Glamorganshire Canal were obtained by the Marquess of Bute, who bought the shares from the Crawshay family. Despite his efforts, the canal was no longer profitable. In 1888, 102,805 tons of goods were carried, but the rates were low in order to encourage use of the canal, and the income did not cover the running expenses.

=== Decline ===
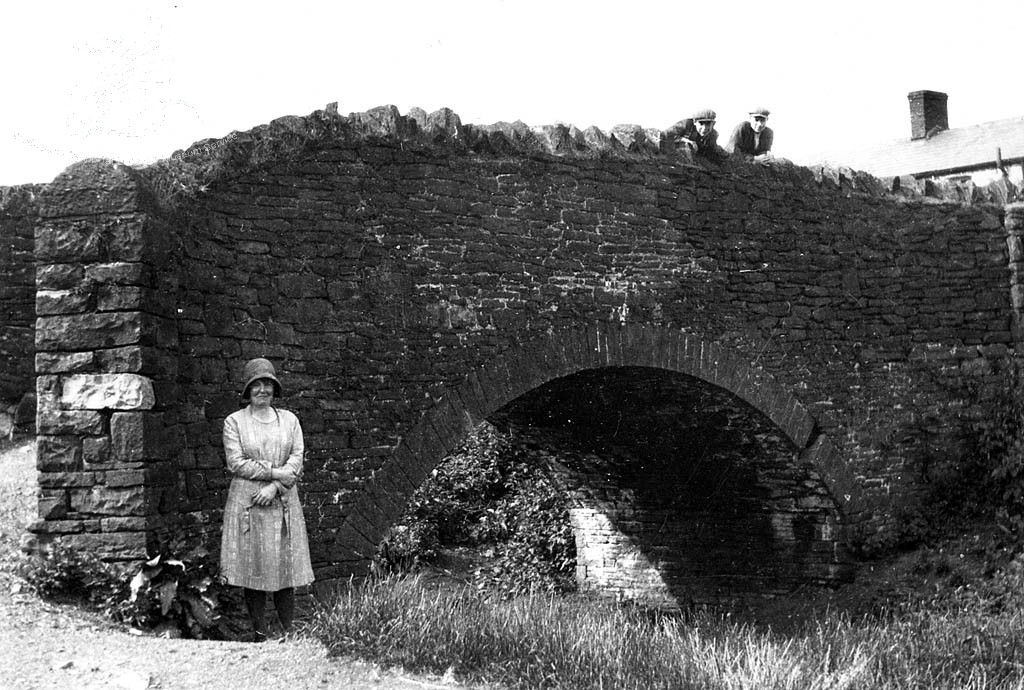
The derelict Abedare Canal at Cwmbach c.1920

By 1897, the volume of traffic had dropped to 7,855 tons, and passage along the canal was extremely difficult, as a result of bridges and towpaths sinking. Maintenance costs kept increasing, and the decision was taken to close the canal in November 1900 on safety grounds. The company continued to operate the tramroad between Penderyn, Hirwaun and Aberdare, with the Penderyn to Hirwaun section being converted to standard gauge and linked to the Great Western Railway in 1904, and the remaining section being sold to the owners of the coal pits in 1944.

Aberdare Canal Act 1924 (Note: Section 1.)
- Act of Parliament
- Parliament of the United Kingdom
- Long title: An Act to confirm the acquisition by the urban district councils of Aberdare and Mountain Ash of the Aberdare Canal and for other purposes.
- Citation: 14 & 15 Geo. 5. c. xxxv
- Territorial extent: United Kingdom

Dates
- Royal assent: 14 July 1924
- Commencement: 14 July 1924 (Note: The Acts of Parliament (Commencement) Act 1793.)

Status: Current legislation

Text of statute as originally enacted

The canal lay unused and derelict until 1923, when it was bought by Aberdare Urban District Council and Mountain Ash District Council. The Aberdare Canal Act 1924 (14 & 15 Geo. 5. c. xxxv) was passed, authorising the purchase, and most of the canal bed was buried under the A4059 and B4275 roads. The Aberdare Canal Company was finally wound up in 1955.

== The route ==
The Cynon Valley is a narrow valley, and the canal followed the course of the northern bank of the Afon Cynon for most of its length. Water was supplied to the top pound by the feeder from the Afon Cynon, and later by the pumping engine at Tyr Founder. The Cwmbach lock had a fall of 9.2 feet (2.8 m), after which the middle pound crossed the Nant Pennar stream on an aqueduct to arrive at the Dyffryn lock, which lowered the level by another 3.8 feet (1.2 m). There were a total of seven overflow weirs, to allow surplus water to return to the river, and a stop lock before the junction with the Glamorganshire Canal.

Road building has obliterated most traces of the canal, but the top section from Canal Head to Ynyscynon House is in water and is now a nature reserve. Canal Head house, the original residence of the clerk of the canal also remains as a private dwelling. The junction with the Glamorganshire Canal was close to Lock Street in Abercynon.

== Points of interest ==
Point	Coordinates (Links to map resources)	OS Grid Ref	Notes
Canal Head	51.7116°N 3.4312°W	SO012023	remaining watered section
Cwmbach Lock	51.6991°N 3.4107°W	SO026009	A4059 road
Duffryn Lock	51.6864°N 3.3841°W	ST044995	A4059 road
Abercynon Junction	51.6501°N 3.3223°W	ST086954	near Lock Street

== See also ==
- Canals of Great Britain
- History of the British canal system
- Waterscape

== Bibliography ==
- Hadfield, Charles (1967). The Canals of South Wales and the Border. David and Charles. ISBN 978-0-7153-4027-1.
- Priestley, Joseph (1831). "Historical Account of the Navigable Rivers, Canals, and Railways, of Great Britain". Archived from the original on 11 March 2016.
- Rowson, Stephen; Wright, Ian L (2001). The Glamorganshire and Aberdare Canals (Vol 1). Black Dwarf Publications. ISBN 978-0-9533028-9-5.
- Skempton, Sir Alec; et al. (2002). A Biographical Dictionary of Civil Engineers in Great Britain and Ireland: Vol 1: 1500 to 1830. Thomas Telford. ISBN 978-0-7277-2939-2.
