= James Dadford =

British civil engineer

James Dadford (c. 1768-1804) was an English canal engineer.

== Early life ==
Dadford was the second son of the engineer Thomas Dadford and Frances Brown. It is not known precisely where he was born, but it was probably in the Wolverhampton area, since his father was employed by the Staffordshire and Worcestershire Canal Company at that time, where he worked as a carpenter and joiner. Between April 1777 and June 1783, he was educated at Sedgley Park Roman Catholic School.

== Career ==
It is unclear when his engineering career started, but he is known to have helped with the construction of the Glamorganshire Canal, although only his father and his older brother Thomas Dadford, Jr. were officially engaged by the company in June 1790 to work with Thomas Sheasby on its construction. In the latter stages of the contract, his father was attempting to manage severe cost overruns, and was by that time also responsible for the collection of tolls on the section that was open. James Dadford was in charge of providing boats, which were used for carrying goods, and were supplemented by waggons. There was a breach of the canal in December 1794 which his father refused to repair without further payment, and so sacked his workforce and resigned from his post. In the ensuing legal wranglings, James felt obliged to sell up his carrying business and depart.

In South Wales, there were plans to link the Glamorganshire Canal to the Neath Canal, and James's younger brother John Dadford was employed to survey a route, which would pass up the Aberdare valley. A canal up the valley to Aberdare was authorised by the Aberdare Canal Act 1793 (33 Geo. 3. c. 95), which also authorised the construction of a network of tramways within 8 miles (13 km) of the line of the canal. By September 1794, James Dadford had constructed a 3 ft 2 in (965 mm) edge railway from collieries at Bryngwyn via Hirwaun to limestone quarries at Penderyn. It may also have extended southwards from Bryngwyn towards Aberdare. The section north of Bryngwyn was 4.25 miles (6.84 km) long and cost £4,000 to build. A railway from Hirwaun limeworks to Penderyn had been built by a Mr Glover in 1780, and it is probable that Dadford reused it as part of the extended line. The Aberdare Canal Company was unusual, in that for the first 16 years of its existence, it did not attempt to build a canal, but instead operated railways. In view of the problems that the Glamorganshire Canal had had with payments to the Dadfords, the clerk of the company was paid an extra £10 to keep track of all payments made to James Dadford and his workers.

He was engineer of the Gloucester and Berkeley Canal from 1795 to 1800. Initially he acted as resident engineer, with Robert Mylne as Chief Engineer, but Mylne was sacked in 1798 and Dadford became the only engineer on the project. His contract was terminated in November 1800, when the canal company ran out of money. As with many engineers of the period, he worked for others concurrently, surveying the Dudley Canal with Charles Roberts in 1799, where they concluded that the canal needed to be strengthened, and reporting on a railway project to link Windmill End to Cabbage Hall in 1800. His health deteriorated, and he died on 20 February 1804 at Stourport. Despite having suffered from a "long and painful illness", he was still employed as engineer for the Staffordshire and Worcestershire Canal at the time of his death.

== See also ==
- Aberdare Canal
- List of canal engineers
- Canals of the United Kingdom
- History of the British canal system
