= List of canal engineers =

A canal engineer is a civil engineer responsible for planning (architectural and otherwise) related to the construction of a canal.

Canal engineers include:

== China ==
- Yu the Great (c.2200BCE-c.2100BCE), first Dynast of China, founder of the first dynasty, who dedicated his life establishing flood control structures across the Chinese Hegemony, including canals, establishing the new hegemony in the process, across flood ruined competing kingdoms.
- Ximen Bao
- Li Bing (c. 3rd century BC), Dujiangyan

== France ==
- Barnabé Brisson, Canal de la Marne au Rhin
- Louis Maurice Adolphe Linant de Bellefonds (1799-1883), Suez Canal
- Philippe Bertrand, Canal du Rhône au Rhin
- Guy Bouessel, Canal de Nantes à Brest
- Pierre du Buat, Philippe Bertrand.Canal de Neufossé
- Joseph Cachin,Canal de Caen à la mer
- Jean-Antoine Chaptal, Canal des Ardennes
- Charles-Étienne Collignon, Canal de la Marne au Rhin
- Pierre-Simon Girard, Canal Saint-Martin
- Louis Didier Jousselin, Grand Canal du Nord, Canal latéral à la Loire
- Anne Pierre Nicolas de Lapisse, Canal de la Sambre à l'Oise
- Joseph Liard, Canal du Rhône au Rhin
- Ferdinand de Lesseps (1805-1894), Suez Canal and the failed first attempt at a canal in Panama
- Louis de Règemortes, Canal de l'Ourcq, Canal de Saint-Quentin
- Pierre-Paul Riquet (1609-1680), Canal du Midi, Canal de l'Ourcq
- Sébastien Le Prestre de Vauban, Canal de Bourbourg

See also, List of canals in france

== Hungary ==
- István Türr (1825-1908), Corinth Canal

== United Kingdom ==
- James Brindley
- James Dadford
- John Dadford
- Thomas Dadford
- Thomas Dadford, Jr.
- Hugh Henshall
- John Hore
- Josias Jessop
- William Jessop
- Benjamin Outram
- John Rennie the Elder
- Thomas Sheasby
- John Smeaton
- William Smith
- Thomas Telford

== United States ==
- James Geddes, Ohio and Erie Canal
- John B. Jervis, Delaware and Hudson Canal
- Loammi Baldwin, Middlesex Canal to Boston
- Orlando Metcalfe Poe, Poe Lock at Soo Locks
- William Weston
- Benjamin Wright, Erie Canal and the Chesapeake and Ohio Canal
- George Washington, Potomac Canal
- Canvass White, Erie Canal
- Sylvanus Thayer, West Point
- Horatio Allen

== See also ==
- List of civil engineers
- Lists of canals
