= Thomas Sheasby =

British engineer and contractor (c.1740–1799)

Thomas Sheasby, Senior (c.1740–1799) was a British civil engineer and contractor. His early work involved bridge construction, after which he went on to build canals, including several in South Wales. He was imprisoned for a time when there were contractual problems with the Glamorganshire Canal Company.

== Early life ==
Although his date of birth is unknown, it is known that Thomas Sheasby was christened on 28 October 1740 in Tamworth, Staffordshire. He was later described as a builder from Tamworth who carried out repairs to bridges for the Warwickshire Quarter Sessions between 1775 and 1787. In 1776, he was contracted to design and build Polesworth Bridge over the Coventry Canal at Polesworth, for which he was paid £364. In 1780, he was also contracted to build and design Duke's Bridge in Coleshill, for which he was paid £306.

== Canal Projects ==
In the late 1780s, Sheasby worked as a contractor on the Birmingham and Fazeley Canal. He was also awarded the contract to connect the Coventry Canal to the Birmingham and Fazeley Canal in June 1785.

Sheasby joined with Thomas Dadford and together they decided to tender for work on the Cromford Canal in 1789. However, they left the job when they received an offer for work on the Glamorganshire Canal in 1790. On 30 June 1790, Thomas Sheasby, Thomas Dadford Sr. and his son submitted a price of £48,258 for the construction of the canal. They gave the canal company a bond of £10,000. There was no engineer for the project, which was managed instead by a committee. There were contractual difficulties between the contractors and the company, which were probably made worse by the lack of an experienced engineer. The contractors accumulated £17,000 in payments for extra work, during the course of the project. Although the canal opened in February 1794, a bank was breached soon afterwards, and the contractors were called back to repair it. The contractors refused to do any work before they received a payment in advance. The company argued that they had been overpaid by £17,000, and imprisoned Sheasby and Dadford Sr., so that they could recover the £10,000 surety. Robert Whitworth was asked to arbitrate, and ruled largely in favour of Sheasby and Dadford, as they were awarded £15,500 of the extra payments. As a result of the imprisonment, Sheasby and Dadford were unable to work on their next project and the next phase of the Glamorganshire Canal was built by Patrick Copland.

After being released, Sheasby was taken on as engineer and contractor to complete the Neath Canal to Glynneath, including the aqueduct at Ynysbwllog. The work was to be completed by 1 November 1793, and he was to be paid £14,886, of which £2,500 was to be withheld for three years. Sheasby was unable to complete the canal in the timeframe, and as he was in discussions over how to complete the canal, he was arrested for the situation in Glamorganshire. The company had to complete the canal themselves.

Despite these setbacks, Sheasby returned to work. He began by assisting Charles Roberts as an engineer on the Swansea Canal. Sheasby had already surveyed the canal in 1793; however, his problems meant he could not be appointed as the engineer at the time. He was appointed engineer in 1796 with his son. The canal was partially opened in 1796 and was completed in October 1798. Sheasby died a year later.

Besides canal construction projects, he was also involved in carrying out surveys for a number of projects, including the Shropshire Canal in 1788, a tramroad in the Brecon Forest and a canal from Llandeilo to Llandovery in 1793.

His son, Thomas Sheasby jnr, also went on to become a notable civil engineer, working initially as a canal engineer and then later constructing tramroads for the Severn and Wye Railway in the Forest of Dean.

== See also ==
- Canals of the United Kingdom
- History of the British canal system
