= Thomas Dadford Jr. =

English canal engineer (c. 1761 – 1801)

Thomas Dadford Jr. (ca. 1761 to 1801) was an English canal engineer, who came from a family of canal engineers. He first worked with his father in the north of Britain on the Stour and the Trent, but later independently, contributing to a number of canal schemes, mainly in Monmouthshire and Glamorganshire but also in Montgomeryshire and Ellesmere, before dying at the age of 40.

== Family history ==
Thomas Dadford was born in Britain around 1761, the first son of Thomas Dadford Sr. and Frances Brown, who are believed to have been living in Wolverhampton at the time. His father was a canal engineer, and his brothers John Dadford and James Dadford also worked in this field. Thomas received his early training from his father.

On 15 August 1797, he married Ann Parker of Chaddesley Corbett, Worcestershire. Both were Christians of the Catholic faith. They had no children.

The marriage did not last long, as Thomas died on 2 April 1801. He died at Crickhowell, and was buried at Llanarth, Monmouthshire. The cause of his death is not known. When he died, he left no will, but his wife obtained letters of administration in her favour; and his "goods, chattels and credits" amounted to £2,000.

== Working history ==
His father was the engineer for the Stourbridge Canal, and from 1776 Thomas assisted him. However, he was dismissed in the following year.

In 1782 he assisted his father again, with a survey of the River Trent, which was to be improved for navigation.

His next project, from 1790, was the construction of the Glamorganshire Canal, where he worked with his father and with Thomas Sheasby. In 1790 he assisted his father and brother John with a survey for the fledgling Neath Canal Company. The following year he became the engineer for the Neath Canal, and also became surveyor and engineer for the Leominster Canal, a position which he held until 1795, simultaneously with his other projects.

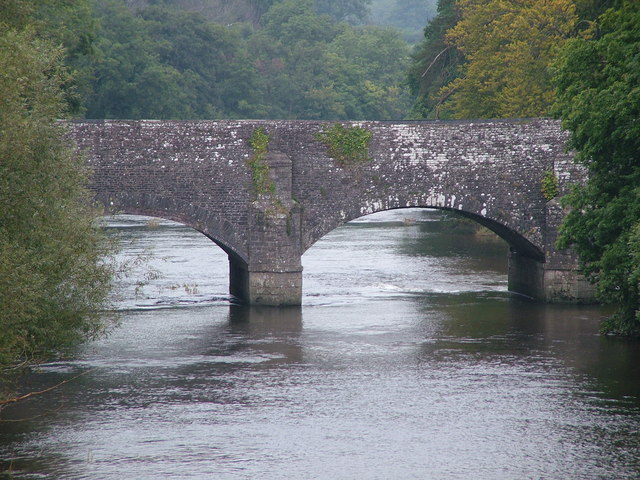
Dadford's aqueduct at Brynich carries the Brecon and Abergavenny Canal over the River Usk

He supervised the construction of the Neath Canal from Neath to Ynysbwllog, where the canal was to cross the River Neath by an aqueduct; but in 1792 he resigned before the project was completed, in order to become engineer for the Monmouthshire Canal. He was contracted to devote three-quarters of his time to the canal, the main line of which was completed by 1796, and the remaining quarter enabled him to fulfill his obligation on the Leominster Canal. In addition to the canal, he supervised construction of five tramways for the canal company, which connected to quarries, ironworks and collieries, and an independent tramway, the Trevil Rail Road. The Monmouthshire Canal Company also asked him to survey the southern section of the Brecknock and Abergavenny Canal, with a view to finding a high level route which would result in most of the canal being lock-free. This he did and the route was adopted. He retained his position as engineer to the Monmouthshire Canal until late 1798.

From 1794 he assisted his brother John, who was engineer on the Montgomeryshire Canal. He was criticized by that company for his lack of attendance, but still managed to be the contractor for one section in 1795 and 1796, and to inspect and report on the final route with his father in 1797.

From January 1796 he was engineer for the Monmouthshire & Brecon Canal, devoting one quarter of his time to this task, and was still acting in this capacity when he died.

His workload was prodigious, as he managed to fit in surveys for the Ellesmere Canal in 1793, a survey for the extension of the Neath Canal from Neath to Giant's Grave in 1798, and a new survey of the proposed route for the Aberdare Canal in 1800, amongst others.

== Achievements ==
During his brief working life Thomas Dadford Jr. managed to achieve a great deal. Major structures for which he was responsible include the fourteen locks on the Monmouthshire Canal at Rogerstone, the embankment at Gilwern which enables the Brecon and Abergavenny Canal to cross the River Clydach and a four-arched stone-built aqueduct which carries the same canal over the River Usk at Brynich.

He had less success with tunnels. The Southnet Tunnel on the Leominster Canal collapsed in 1795 (for which he was criticized by the engineer John Rennie), and the Ashford tunnel on the Brecon and Abergavenny Canal collapsed during construction.

== See also ==
- Canals of the United Kingdom
- History of the British canal system
