= Thomas Dadford =

English canal engineer (died 1809)

Thomas Dadford Sr. (died 1809) was an English canal engineer as were his sons, Thomas Dadford Jr., John Dadford, and James Dadford.

== Biography ==
Thomas Dadford probably originated from Stewponey or Stourton, Staffordshire, near Stourbridge. He started as one of James Brindley's many pupil-assistants, in which capacity he worked on the Staffordshire and Worcestershire Canal and the Birmingham Canal Navigations.

He was engineer and surveyor on the Dudley Canal until 1783, and consulted by them later when they were extending through Dudley Tunnel.

- 1774 – with John Priddy he surveyed the Stroudwater Canal
- 1782 – with Thomas (Junior), he made recommendations for improvements to the River Trent.
- 1784 – advised on the Coventry Canal's aqueduct over the River Tame.
- 1789 – cutting contractor on the Cromford Canal.
- 1791, he became a shareholder of the Neath Canal.

The latter part of his career was spent in Monmouthshire, Glamorganshire, and Montgomeryshire, for example on the Monmouthshire & Brecon Canal in the early 1790s, often working with his two sons. He worked on many canal projects, including the Neath and the Aberdare, in many of which he was also a shareholder. Until 1794, with his son and Thomas Sheasby, he was engineer and contractor on the Glamorganshire Canal, until they had a row with the company and were arrested for alleged overpayments. The matter was later resolved in their favour and they were exonerated.

His last canal was the Montgomeryshire, where he succeeded his son John as engineer in July 1797.

== See also ==
- Canals of the United Kingdom
- History of the British canal system
