= John Dadford =

English canal engineer (c. 1769 – c. 1800)

- Born: c. 1769; Wolverhampton area, England
- Died: c. 1800
- Citizenship: English
- Occupation: Canal engineer
- Parent(s): Thomas Dadford; Frances Brown
- Relatives: Thomas Dadford Jr. (brother); James Dadford (brother)

John Dadford was an English canal engineer, as were his father Thomas Dadford and brothers Thomas Dadford, Jr. and James Dadford. He lived from approximately 1769 to 1800, although neither date is known for certain.

== Biography ==
John Dadford was the third son of the canal engineer Thomas Dadford and his wife Frances Brown, the daughter of a Wolverhampton toymaker called Samuel Brown. They lived in the Wolverhampton area, and John was probably born in that area. His older brothers were Thomas and James, both of whom worked as canal engineers. He had a younger brother called William and a sister called Mary. He is known to have been a pupil at Sedgley Park Roman Catholic School between May 1778 and June 1781.

== Career ==
By 1790, he was working as an engineer, assisting his father and his brother Thomas with surveys for the Neath Canal. His involvement with the construction of the Glamorganshire Canal is less certain, but quite likely. By 1792, he was working independently, surveying a route for a canal and tramway to connect the Neath Canal to the Glamorganshire Canal, and a route for a road along the Aberdare Valley. Between 1792 and 1793, he was employed as a carrier on the Glamorganshire Canal.

His next major project was the Brecknock and Abergavenny Canal. When he first surveyed the line, it was to run from the Glangrwyney Ironworks near Gilwern to the River Usk at Newbridge, near Caerleon, but the northern terminus was then extended to Brecon, and negotiations with the Monmouthshire Canal resulted in a revised line, with the two canals joining at Pontymoile. A bill was presented to Parliament in January 1793, but after its second reading, the Monmouthshire Canal succeeded in making an amendment, for a somewhat different route which had been surveyed by his brother Thomas.

An Act of Parliament to authorise the canal was obtained in March 1793, and allowed either the company or owners of collieries to build tramroads from the canal to points up to 8 miles (13 km) from it. Although no work on the canal had started, the company began building the Clydach Tramway, with Dadford as engineer. It used edge rails, like modern railways, which were laid on iron sleepers initially, but then on wooden sleepers. It is difficult to be certain which sections Dadford was responsible for, with Hadfield describing a tramroad from Gelli-felen colliery to Gilwern, which then crossed the River Usk to reach Glangrwyne, where iron from Ebbw Vale was worked in a forge Skempton describes a 5.5-mile (8.9 km) tramroad from Llangroiney [Glangrwyne] to Gellifelen, and a second section from Gellifelen to Fossalog, near Nantyglo, while Gladwin and Gladwin describe a 1.4-mile (2.3 km) route from Llammarch Colliery to Clydach Ironworks. Dadford's bridge over the Usk collapsed in February 1795, when the river was in flood, and the fact that he had not built flood relief culverts into the embankments on either side of the bridge was deemed to have been a contributory factor in its failure.

In July 1794, he became the engineer for the Montgomeryshire Canal, which extended the Llanymynech Branch of the Ellesmere Canal from its terminus at Llanymynech to Newtown. It had been authorised in March 1794, and John was to be assisted by his brother Thomas. The route involved crossing the River Vyrnwy, where a five-arched aqueduct was built, each with a span of 39 feet (12 m), and crossing the River Rhiw at Berriew, where two 30-foot (9.1 m) arches spanned the river, and there were two more arches on the land. One of the arches of the Vyrnwy aqueduct collapsed, and there were troubles with the Rhiw aqueduct. He resigned in July 1796 and emigrated to America. On his brother's suggestion, he was replaced by his father. The committee was critical of the Dadfords, but when they called in William Jessop to advise them, he suggested that such issues were merely teething problems and were quite normal on such a project.

== Legacy ==
It is not known what Dadford did after emigrating, and he was not mentioned in his father's will in 1809, which probably indicates that he died there before then. Despite the failure of some of his bridges, he was highly regarded, with the Monmouthshire Canal requesting that if anyone was sent down to inspect the works, they would prefer John Dadford to anyone else.

== See also ==
- Canals of the United Kingdom
- History of the British canal system

== Notes ==
The spelling of Glangrwyne is encountered in different forms, including Glangrwyney and Llangrwyne.
