= Llangollen Canal Museum =

Grade II listed building in Denbighshire

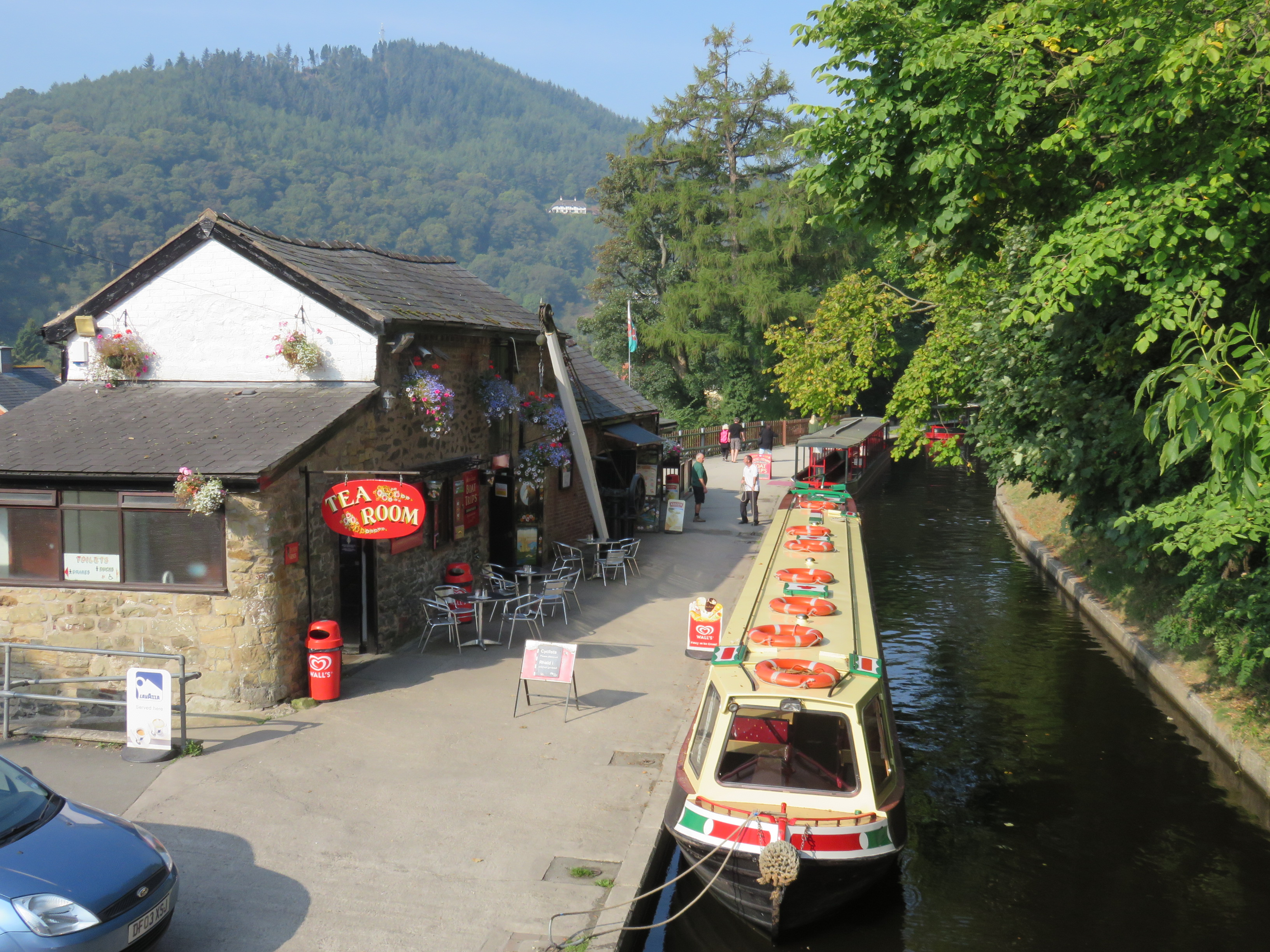
- Llangollen Wharf

- Location within Wales

General information
- Status: Completed
- Location: Llangollen, Denbighshire, Wales
- Coordinates: 52.971949°N 3.170526°W

Website
- Llangollen Wharf

References
- Cadw 1225

Llangollen Canal Museum is a Grade II listed building in Llangollen.

Listed by Cadw (Reference Number 1225) and thought to have been built between 1804 and 1808, it was originally a single storey warehouse but was later heightened to two stories and extended in red brick.

Horse-drawn boat trips operate from the wharf and there is a tea room and gift shop. There was a museum, the Canal Exhibition Centre, in the building from 1974, but by 2000 the exhibition had been moved into the Llangollen Motor Museum.
