= Canals of the United Kingdom =

Network of inland waterways

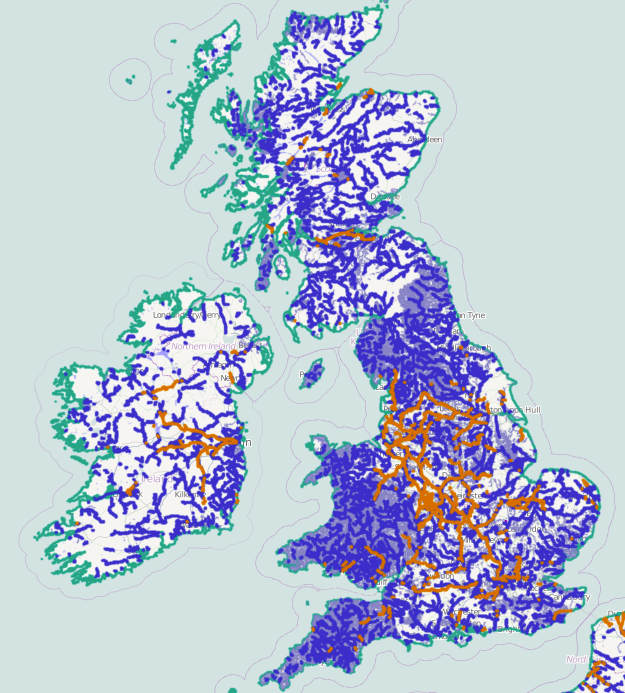
Map showing canals of Great Britain and Ireland. Canals in orange, rivers in blue, streams in grey.

The canals of the United Kingdom are a major part of the network of inland waterways in the United Kingdom. They have a varied history, from use for irrigation and transport, through becoming the focus of the Industrial Revolution, to today's role of recreational boating. Despite a period of abandonment, today the canal system in the United Kingdom is again increasing in use, with abandoned and derelict canals being reopened, and the construction of some new routes. Canals in Scotland are maintained by Scottish Canals whereas canals in England and Wales are maintained by navigation authorities. The biggest navigation authorities are the Canal & River Trust and the Environment Agency, but other canals are managed by companies, local authorities or charitable trusts.

The majority of canals in the United Kingdom can accommodate boats with a length of between 55 and 72 feet (17 and 22 m) and are now used primarily for leisure. There are a number of canals which are far larger than this, including the New Junction Canal and the Gloucester and Sharpness Canal, which can accommodate boats with a length of up to 230 feet (70 m). An incomparable purpose-built ship canal is the Manchester Ship Canal. Upon opening in 1894, it was the largest ship canal in the world, permitting ships with a length of up to 600 feet (183 m) to navigate its 36-mile (58 km) route.

== History of commercial carrying ==
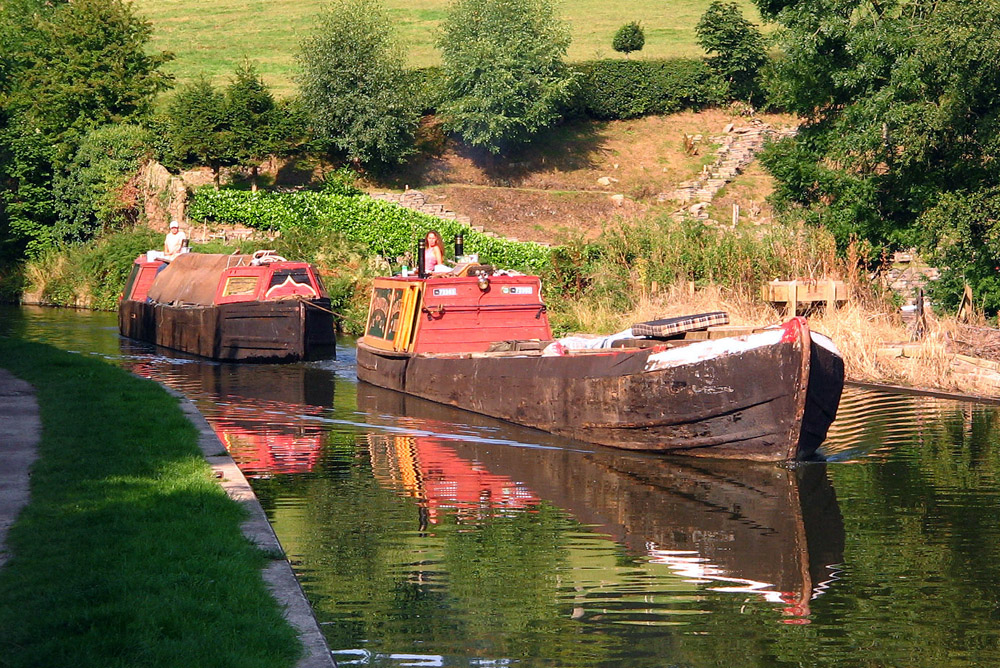
Traditional working canal boats

Canals first saw use during the Roman occupation of the south of Great Britain and were used mainly for irrigation. The Romans also created several navigable canals, such as Foss Dyke, to link rivers, enabling increased transport inland by water.

The United Kingdom's navigable water network grew as the demand for industrial transport increased. The canals were key to the pace of the Industrial Revolution: roads at the time were unsuitable for large volumes of traffic. A system of very large pack horse trains had developed, but few roads were suitable for wheeled vehicles able to transport large amounts of materials (especially fragile manufactured goods such as pottery) quickly. Canal boats were much quicker, could carry large volumes, and were much safer for fragile items. Following the success of first the Sankey Canal followed by the Bridgewater Canal, other canals were constructed between industrial centres, cities and ports, and were soon transporting raw materials (particularly coal and lumber) and manufactured goods. There were immediate benefits to households, as well as to commerce: in Manchester, the cost of coal fell by 75% when the Bridgewater Canal arrived.

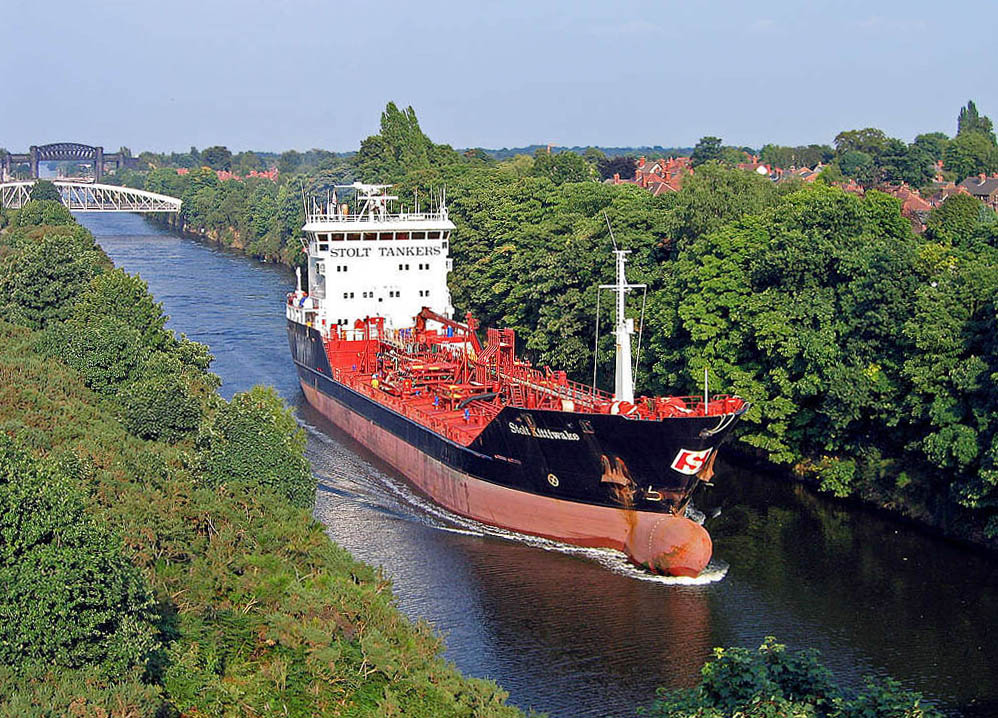
The Manchester Ship Canal can accommodate ships with a length of up to 600 feet (183 m).

As the Industrial Revolution took hold in the end of the 18th and beginning of the 19th centuries, the technology allowed canals to be improved. The early canals contoured round hills and valleys, later ones went straighter. Locks took canals up and down hills, and they strode across valleys on taller and longer aqueducts and through hills in longer and deeper tunnels.

From the mid-19th century, railways began to replace canals, especially those built with the standard narrow (7 ft [2.1 m]) bridges and locks. As trains, and later road vehicles, became more advanced, they became cheaper than the narrow canal system, being faster, and able to carry much larger cargoes. The canal network declined, and many canals were bought by railway companies – in some cases to enable them to penetrate rival companies' areas transhipping to/from canal boats. Some narrow canals became unusable, filled with weeds, silt and rubbish, or were converted to railways.

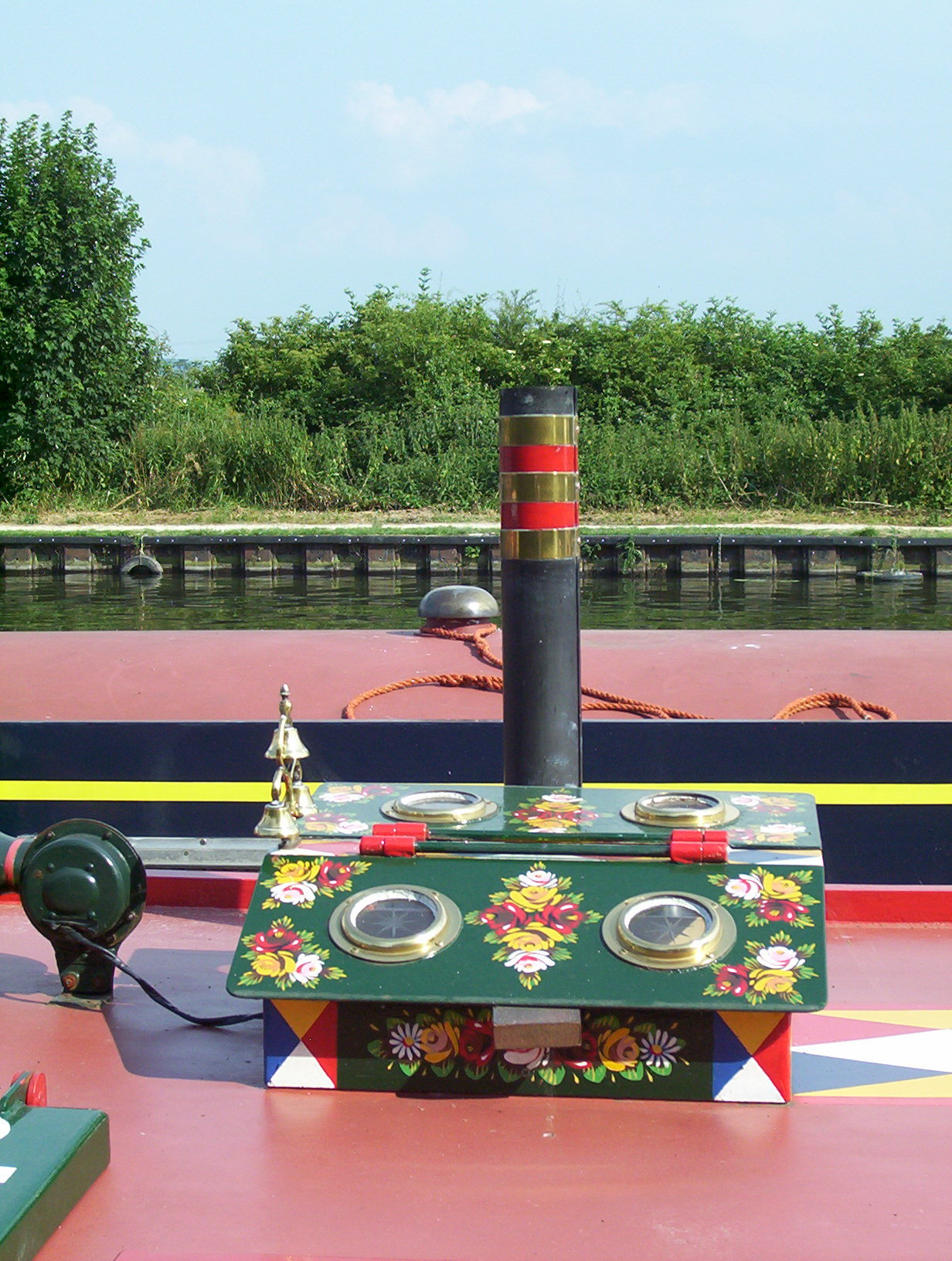
'...gleaming brass and gaily-painted metalware....' Saul, Gloucestershire

There was a late burst of wide-waterway building (e.g. the Caledonian Canal, and the Manchester Ship Canal), and of invention and innovation by people such as Bartholomew of the Aire and Calder company, who conceived the trains of nineteen coal-filled "Tom Pudding" compartment boats that were pulled along the Aire and Calder Navigation from the Yorkshire coalfields, then lifted bodily to upturn their contents directly into seagoing colliers at Goole Docks (their descendants, Hargreaves' tugs pushing three coal-pans trains to be upended into hoppers at the Aire power stations lasted as late as 2004). However, the last new canal before the end of the 20th century was the New Junction Canal in Yorkshire (now South Yorkshire) in 1905. As competition intensified, horse-drawn single narrowboats were replaced by steam and later diesel powered boats towing an unpowered butty, and many of the boatmen's families abandoned their shore homes for a life afloat, to help with boat handling and to reduce accommodation costs – the birth of the "boatman's cabin" with bright white lace, gleaming brass and gaily-painted metalware. A trip on the canal system was described colloquially as "a cruise on the cut".

Constant lowering of tolls meant that the carriage of some bulky, non-perishable, and non-vital goods by water was still feasible on some inland waterways – but the death knell for commercial carrying on the narrow canals was sounded in the winter of 1962–63, when a long hard frost kept goods icebound on the canals for three months. A few of the remaining customers turned to road and rail haulage to ensure reliability of supply and never returned, though both rail and road had been severely disrupted by the frost and snow too. Other narrowboat traffic gradually ceased with the change from coal to oil, the closure of canalside factories, and run-down of British heavy industry. The last long-distance narrowboat traffics, coal from the Midlands to Dickinson's paper mills at Croxley and the Kearley and Tonge jam factory at Southall both ceased in 1970 – the Croxley mills had changed to oil and the jam factory closed for re-location. Regular narrowboat traffics continued, such as lime juice from Brentford to Boxmoor (until 1981) while aggregates were carried on the River Soar until 1988.

Some individual waterways (especially the Manchester Ship Canal, the Aire and Calder Navigation and the other large waterways) remain viable, carrying many millions of tonnes per year and there are still hopes for development, but containerisation of ports and lorries has mostly passed the waterways by. The last major investment development of the inland waterways was the enlargement of the Sheffield and South Yorkshire Navigation in the early 1980s to cope with barges of standard European dimensions that never came. There have been a number of successful initiatives to get more traffic on to the larger inland waterways, though even the Manchester Ship Canal does not convey cargo ships to the docks in Salford, which have become little more than a water feature for the apartments, offices and cultural institutions of 'Salford Quays' that have replaced the wharves and warehouses.

== Growth of leisure use ==
Early use of the canals for leisure travel was fairly limited. One of the earliest records of pleasure cruising was published in 1891. Two Girls on a Barge by Miss V. Cecil Cotes describes an unconventional adventure by two young ladies who took a barge from Paddington to Coventry. With the introduction of motor boats, George Westall authored a book in 1908, Inland Cruising on the Rivers and Canals of England and Wales which was published by Lander, Westall and Co. In 1916, P. Bonthron published My Holidays on Inland Waterways which described his adventures covering 2,000 miles of inland waterways in his motor boat.

In the latter half of the 20th century, while the use of canals for transporting goods was dying out, there was a rise in interest in their history and potential use for leisure. A large amount of credit for this is usually given to L. T. C. Rolt, whose book Narrow Boat about a journey made in the narrowboat Cressy was published in 1944. A key development was the foundation of the Inland Waterways Association, and the establishment of fledgling weekly boat-hire companies, following the example of such companies on the Norfolk Broads, which had long been used for leisure boating. The authority responsible for the canals, the British Waterways Board, encouraged this process from the late 1950s by operating a fleet of holiday hire boats, initially converted from cut-down working boats.

Holidaymakers began renting 'narrowboats' and roaming the canals, visiting towns and villages they passed. Richer people bought boats to use for weekend breaks and the occasional longer trip. The concept of a canal holiday became even more familiar when the large agencies that dealt with Broads holidays began to include canal boatyards in their brochures. Canal-based holidays became popular due to their relaxing nature, self-catering levels of cost, and variety of scenery available; from inner London to the Scottish Highlands. This growth in interest came just in time to give local canal societies the ammunition they needed to combat government proposals in the 1960s to close commercially unviable canals, and to resist pressure from local authorities and newspapers to "fill in this eyesore" or even to "close the killer canal" (when someone fell in one). It was not long before enthusiastic volunteers were repairing unnavigable but officially open canals and moving on to restore officially closed ones and demonstrating their renewed viability to the authorities.

Local authorities began to see how a cleaned-up and well-used waterway was bringing visitors to other towns and waterside pubs – not just boaters, but people who just like being near water and watching boats (see gongoozler). They began to clean up their own watersides, and to campaign for "their" canal to be restored. As a result of this growing revival of interest, for the first time in a century some new routes have been constructed (the Ribble Link and the Liverpool Canal Link), another is under construction (the Fens Waterways Link). Large projects such as the restoration of the Anderton Boat Lift, or the building of the Falkirk Wheel attracted development funding from the European Union and from the Millennium Fund. The Rochdale Canal, the Huddersfield Narrow Canal and the Droitwich Canals have all been restored to navigation since 2000.

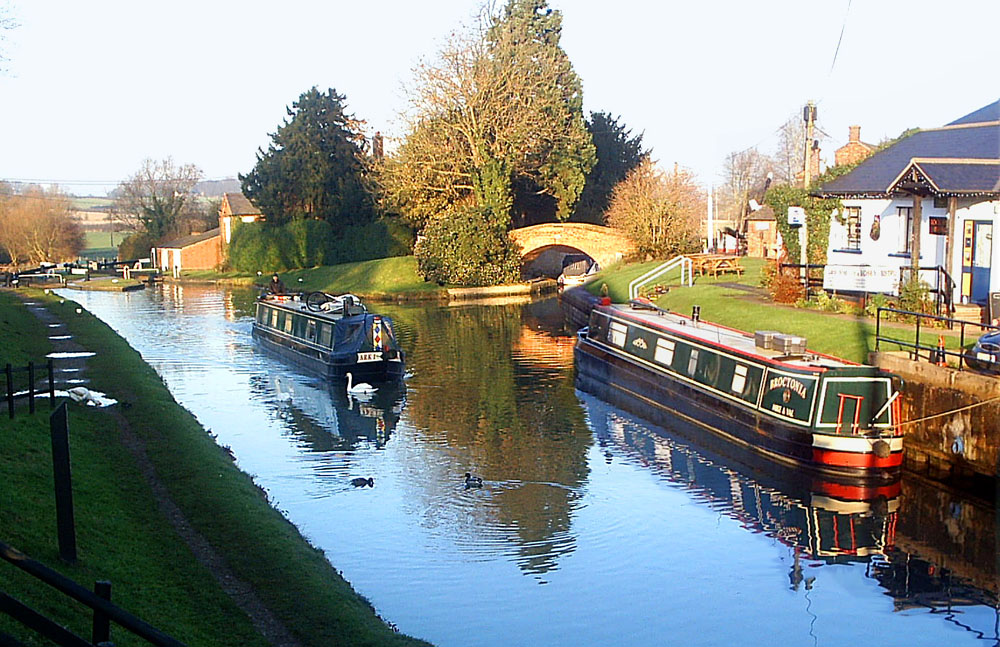
The Oxford Canal near Rugby

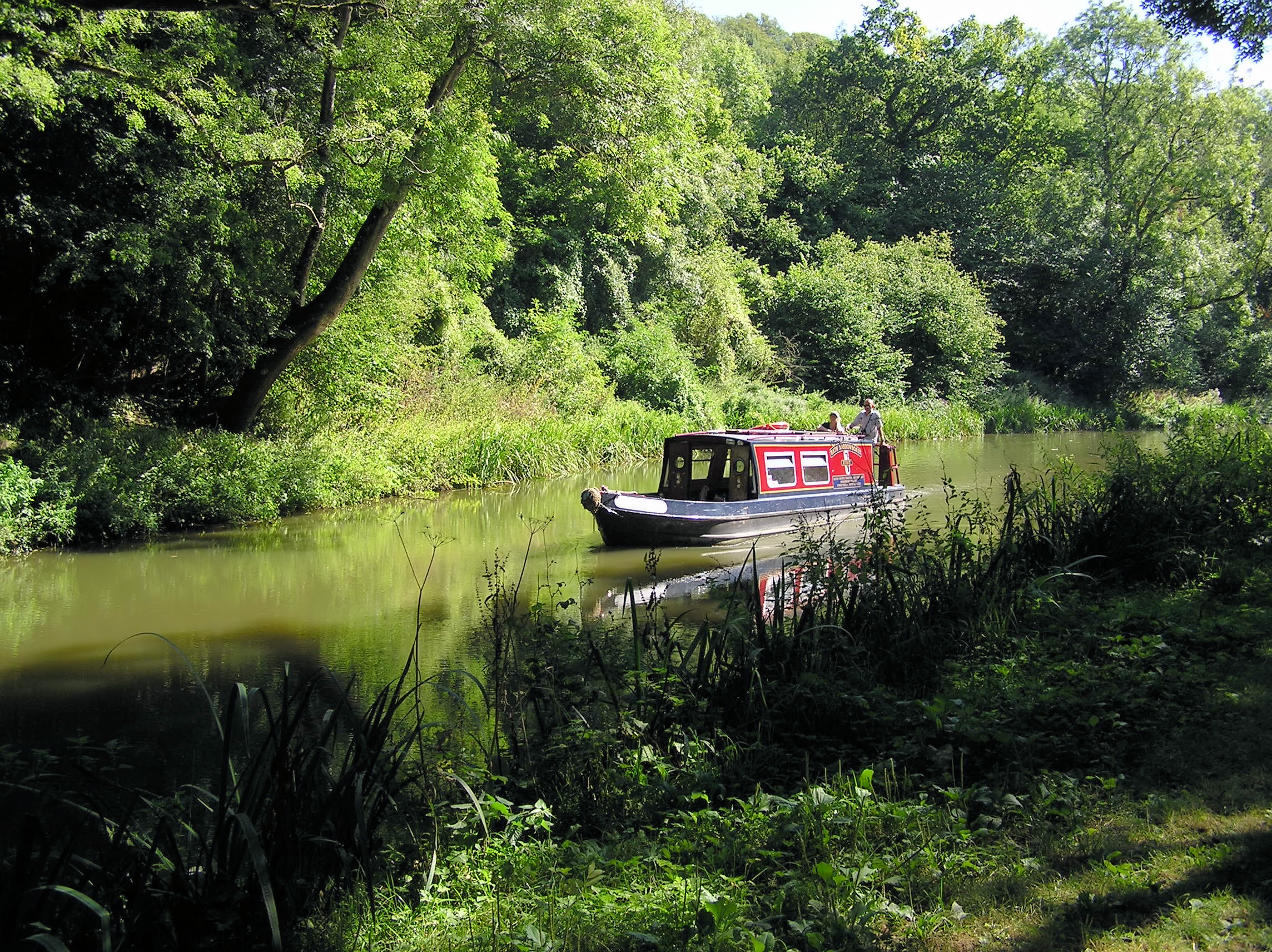
The Kennet and Avon Canal near the Dundas Aqueduct, Wiltshire

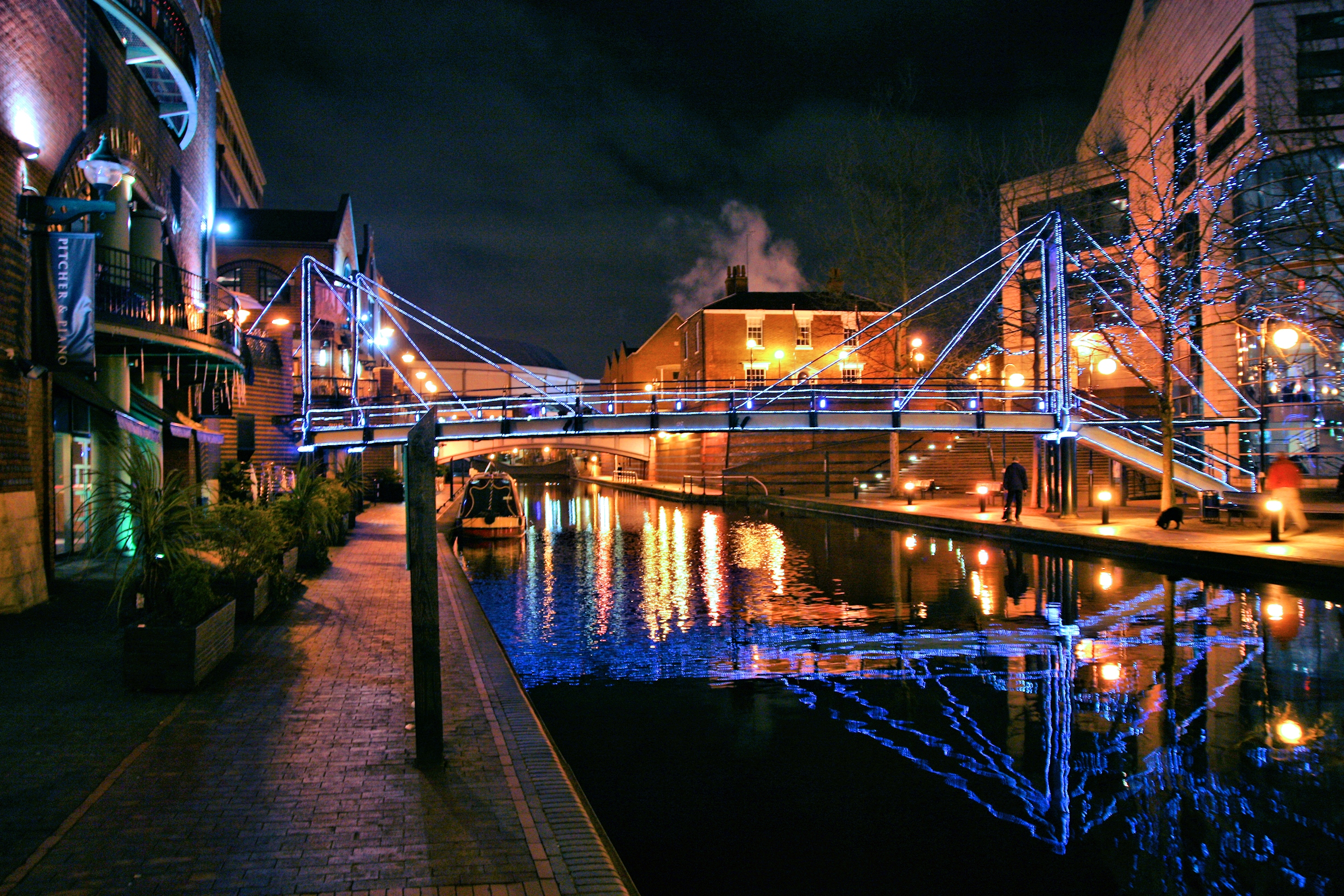
Bridge over Birmingham Canal Old Main Line in central Birmingham

== Present status ==
Map of the current system

There are now about 4,700 miles (7,600 km) of navigable canals and rivers throughout the United Kingdom; 2,700 miles (4,345 km) of these are part of the connected system. Most of them are linked into a single English and Welsh network from Bristol to London, Liverpool to Goole and Lancaster to Ripon, and connecting the Irish Sea, the North Sea, the estuaries of the Humber, Thames, Mersey, Severn and Ribble. This network is navigable in its entirety by a narrowboat (a boat 7 ft [2.1 m] wide) no longer than about 56 ft (17 m). There are also several through-routes not connected to the main network, notably those in Scotland, e.g., Glasgow to Edinburgh via the Forth and Clyde Canal, the Falkirk Wheel, and the Union Canal; and Fort William to Inverness via the Caledonian Canal (including Loch Lochy, Loch Oich, and Loch Ness).

There are four separate sections of the inland canal network accessible to wide or broad-beam boats of around 12.6 ft [3.8 m] wide (though two each are linked by tidal waterways). However, long-term proposed and already underway restorations and constructions of new routes would eventually link these sections, enabling wide boats to move freely between them and create a true north–south east–west network.

The aim of campaigning bodies such as the Inland Waterways Association is to protect the existing waterways and help restore once-navigable waterways. In May 2005, it was reported that British Waterways (the predecessor to the Canal & River Trust) was hoping to quadruple the amount of cargo carried on Britain's canal network to six million tonnes by 2010 by transporting large amounts of waste to disposal facilities.

The speed limit for the majority of inland waterways in the United Kingdom managed by the Canal & River Trust is 4 mph (6.4 km/h). All speed measurements on Canal & River Trust waterways are expressed in terms of speed over the ground, rather than speed through the water.

== Canal features ==
=== Aqueducts ===
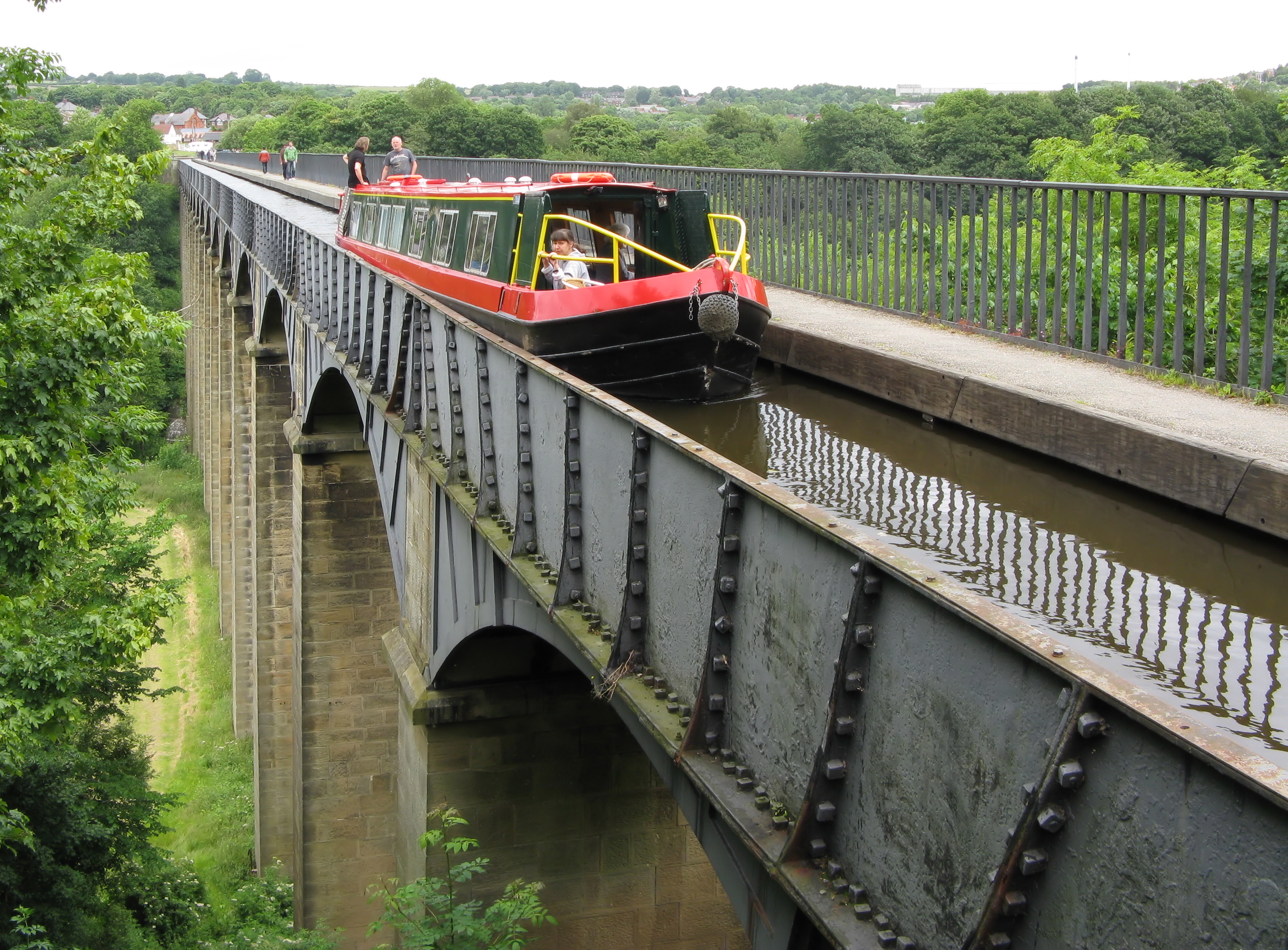
A canal boat traverses the Pontcysyllte navigable aqueduct, Wrexham, Wales.

Canal aqueducts are structures that carry a canal across a valley, road, railway, or another canal. Dundas Aqueduct is built of stone in a classical style. Pontcysyllte Aqueduct is an iron trough on tall stone piers. Barton Swing Aqueduct opens to let ships pass underneath on the Manchester Ship Canal. Three Bridges, London is an arrangement allowing the routes of the Grand Junction Canal, a road, and a railway line to cross each other.

=== Boat lifts ===
- Anderton Boat Lift
- Falkirk Wheel
- Combe Hay Caisson Lock

=== Inclined planes ===
- Hay Inclined Plane
- Foxton Inclined Plane
- Worsley Underground Incline

=== Locks ===
Locks are the most common means of raising or lowering a boat from one water level to another. The distinguishing feature of a lock is a fixed chamber whose water-level can be changed.

Where a large height difference has to be overcome, locks are built close together in a flight such as at Caen Hill Locks. Where the gradient is very steep, a set of staircase locks are sometimes used, like Bingley Five Rise Locks. At the other extreme stop locks have little or no change in level but were built to conserve water where one canal joined another. An interesting example is King's Norton Stop Lock which was built with guillotine gates.

See also List of canal locks in the United Kingdom.

== Canal boats ==
- Bastard boats or Statters (12' / 3.65 m beam; wide boats on Manchester, Bolton & Bury)
- Broad-beam boats (called "wide boats" on the Grand Union canal, 2.2 m to 4.3 m beam)
- Cabin Cruisers
- Fly-boats (long and short; on the Aire and Calder Navigation)
- Keels (on Aire and Calder Navigation)
- Long boats (narrow boats used on the River Severn)
- Mersey Flat, a doubled-ended, fully decked carvel-built barge that worked canals in NW England.
- Narrowboats or Narrow Boats (nominally 6 feet 10 inches (2.08 m) beam); originally working boats on Midlands canals; now mostly pleasure boats)
- Severners (used on the River Severn)
- Severn Trow used on the River Severn and made for the Stroudwater Navigation (Cotswold Canal Trust)
- Short boats (on Northern canals such as Leeds & Liverpool, Calder & Hebble, Aire and Calder Navigation)
- Stort boats – used on the Stort Navigation, with a 13 feet 3 inches (4.04 m) beam
- Sloops (on Aire and Calder Navigation)
- Starvationers used in the Worsley Navigable Levels and the Bridgewater Canal.
- Tom Pudding coal tubs used on the Aire and Calder Navigation and other canals in the South Yorkshire Coalfield.
- Trench boats (for 6' / 1.83 m locks on the Trench, Telford Arm of the Shrewsbury Canal)
- Tub boats (used on various canals including the Bude Canal and the Grand Western Canal)
- White boats (on Aire and Calder Navigation; with white side decks for working at night)
- Widebeams; canal boats more than 6 feet 10 inches (2.08 m) beam

== Canal museums ==
- National Waterways Museum, Ellesmere Port, Merseyside
- Foxton Canal Museum, Harborough, Leicestershire
- Galton Valley Canal Heritage Centre, Smethwick, West Midlands
- Gloucester Waterways Museum
- Kennet & Avon Canal Museum, Devizes, Wiltshire
- Linlithgow Canal Centre, Scotland
- Llangollen Canal Museum, North Wales
- London Canal Museum, Kings Cross, London
- Portland Basin Museum, Manchester
- Stoke Bruerne Canal Museum, Northamptonshire
- Tapton Lock Visitor Centre, Chesterfield
- Yorkshire Waterways Museum, Goole, East Yorkshire
- Standedge Canal Tunnel Visitors Centre and Museum, Marsden, Yorkshire

== Canal archives ==
The Canals Collection at the Cadbury Research Library (University of Birmingham) contains archive materials relating to Midlands canals in the late eighteenth and early nineteenth centuries.

== Canal engineers ==
- James Brindley
- William Jessop
- James Dadford
- John Dadford
- Thomas Dadford
- Thomas Dadford, Jr.
- James Green
- John Rennie the Elder
- Thomas Telford
- John Varley
- Sir Edward Leader Williams

== See also ==
- Canals of Ireland
- Geography of the United Kingdom
- Waterways in the United Kingdom
- Waterway restoration
- List of navigation authorities in the United Kingdom
- List of waterway societies in the United Kingdom
- World Canals Conference
- Canal ring
- Canal reservoirs in England
- List of canal aqueducts in the United Kingdom
