= Neath and Tennant Canal =

Canals in South Wales

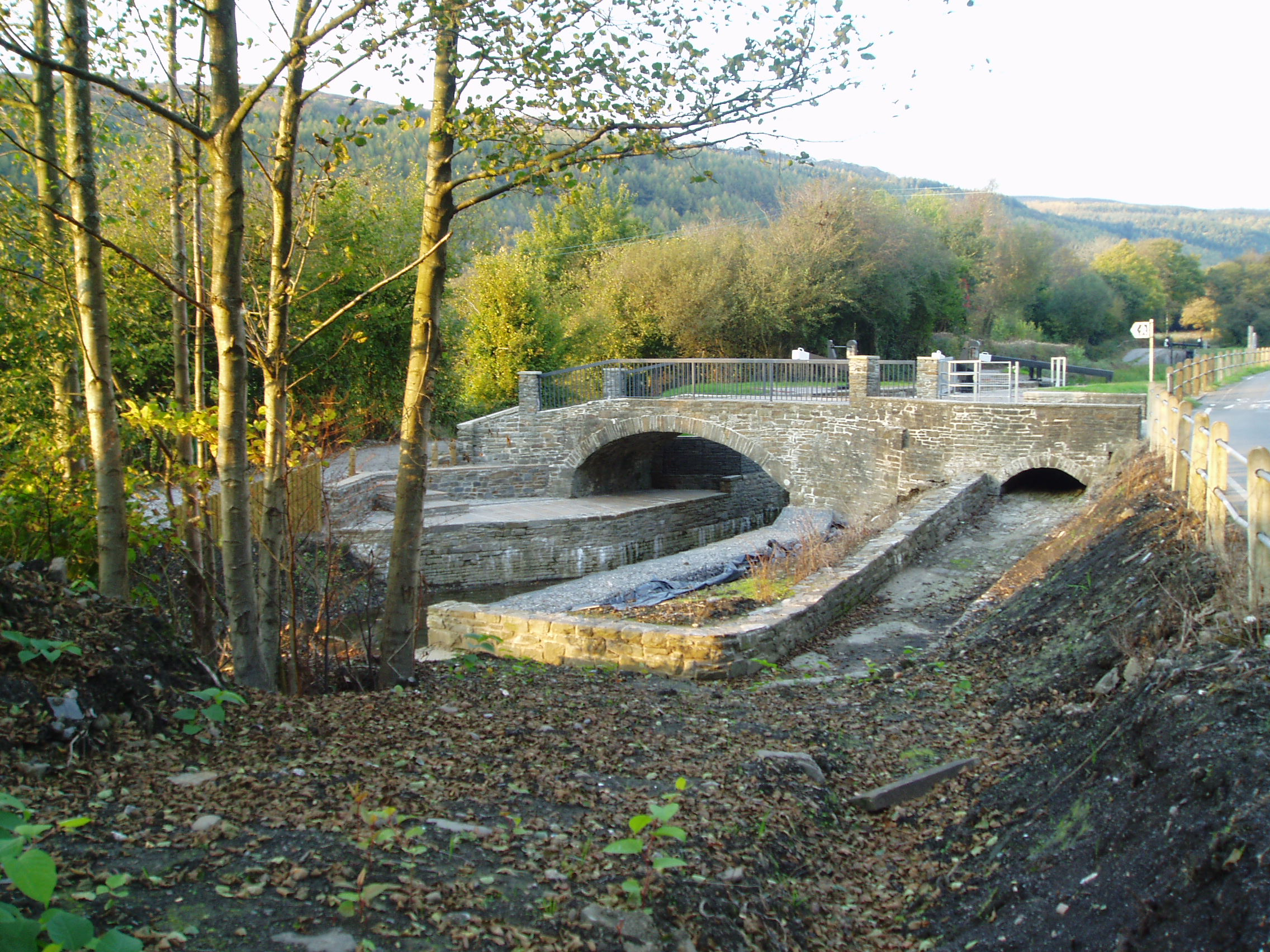
- The exit from Clun Isaf lock, restored in 2007

Specifications
- Maximum boat length: 60 ft 0 in (18.29 m)
- Maximum boat beam: 9 ft 0 in (2.74 m)
- Locks: 15 (originally 21)
- Status: Under restoration
- Navigation authority: Neath Canal Navigation Co. Port Tennant Navigation Co.

History
- Original owner: Neath Canal Navigation Co. Port Tennant Navigation Co.
- Principal engineer: Thomas Dadford
- Other engineer: George Tennant
- Date of act: 1791
- Date of first use: 1795
- Date completed: 1824
- Date closed: 1930s
- Date restored: 1990 onwards

Geography
- Start point: Glynneath
- End point: Briton Ferry / Swansea Docks

The Neath and Tennant Canals are two independent but linked canals in South Wales that are usually regarded as a single canal. The Neath Canal was opened from Glynneath to Melincryddan, to the south of Neath, in 1795 and extended to Giant's Grave in 1799, in order to provide better shipping facilities. With several small later extensions it reached its final destination at Briton Ferry. No traffic figures are available, but it was successful, as dividends of 16 per cent were paid on the shares. The canal was 13.5 miles (21.7 km) long and included 19 locks.

The Tennant Canal was a development of the Glan-y-wern Canal, which was built across Crymlyn Bog to transport coal from a colliery on its northern edge to a creek on the River Neath called Red Jacket Pill. It closed after 20 years, but was enlarged and extended by George Tennant in 1818, to provide a navigable link from the River Neath to the River Tawe at Swansea docks. In order to increase trade, he built an extension to Aberdulais basin, where it linked to the Neath Canal. The extension was built without an act of Parliament and there was a long delay while Tennant attempted to resolve a dispute with a landowner over the routing of the canal. Once opened, much of the Neath traffic used the Tennant Canal, as Swansea provided better facilities for transferring cargo to ships.

Use of the canals for navigation ceased in the 1930s, but they were retained as water channels to supply water to local industries and to Swansea docks. The first attempts at restoration began in 1974 with the formation of the Neath and Tennant Canals Society. The section north of Resolven was restored in the late 1980s, and the canal from Neath to Abergarwed has been restored more recently. This project involved the replacement of Ynysbwllog aqueduct, which carries the canal over the river Neath, with a new 35-yard (32 m) plate girder structure, believed to be the longest single-span aqueduct in Britain. Some obstacles remain to its complete restoration. In 2003 a feasibility study was published, suggesting that the canal could become part of a small network, if it was linked through Swansea docks to a restored Swansea Canal.

== Neath Canal ==
Encouraged by the recent grant of an act of Parliament to authorise the building of the Glamorganshire Canal, it was resolved at a meeting at the Ship & Castle public house in Neath on 12 July 1790 to build a canal from Pontneddfechan to Neath, and another from Neath to Giant's Grave. Among those attending was Lord Vernon, who had already built a short canal near Giant's Grave to connect the River Neath to furnaces at Penrhiwtyn. Thomas Dadford was asked to survey a course, and he was assisted by his father and brother. He proposed a route which required 22 locks, part of which was a conventional canal, while other parts used the River Neath. Dadford costed the project at £25,716, but in early 1791 Lord Vernon's agent, Lewis Thomas, proposed two new cuts, and the idea of using the river was dropped soon afterwards.

Neath Canal Act 1791
- Act of Parliament
- Parliament of Great Britain
- Long title: An Act for making and maintaining a Canal or Navigable Communication from or near a certain Place called Abernant, in the County of Glamorgan, to and through a certain Place called the Brickfield, near Melincrythan Pill, into the River of Neath, near the Town of Neath, in the said County.
- Citation: 31 Geo. 3. c. 85
- Territorial extent: Great Britain

Dates
- Royal assent: 6 June 1791
- Commencement: 10 August 1790 (Note: Start of session.)
Other legislation
Amended by	Neath Canal Navigation Act 1798; SI 1973/96; Neath Canal (Cnel Bach) (Repeal of Local Enactments) Order 1992

Status: Amended

Text of statute as originally enacted

The canal was authorised by an act of Parliament, the Neath Canal Act 1791 (31 Geo. 3. c. 85), passed on 6 June 1791, which created The Company and Proprietors of the Neath Canal Navigation, who had powers to raise £25,000 by the issue of shares, and an additional £10,000 if necessary. As well as building the canal, the canal company could build inclined planes, railways or rollers if required, and could optionally use the bed of the River Neath. The canal was to run from Glynneath (called Abernant at the time), which was not as far up the valley as Pontneddfechan, to Melincryddan Pill at Neath, where it would join the river. Thomas Dadford was employed as engineer, and construction started from Neath, northwards towards Glynneath. The canal had reached the River Neath at Ynysbwllog by 1792, when Dadford resigned to take up work on the Monmouthshire Canal. He was replaced by Thomas Sheasby, who failed to complete the canal by the November 1793 deadline given to him, and was arrested in 1794 for irregularities in the accounts of the Glamorganshire Canal. The canal company completed the building work by 1795, using direct labour, although the lock into the river was never built. Rebuilding of locks and other improvements continued to be made for several years afterwards.

Neath Canal Navigation Act 1798
- Act of Parliament
- Parliament of Great Britain
- Long title: An act for extending the Neath canal navigation, and for amending an act passed in the thirty-first year of the reign of his present Majesty for making the said canal.
- Citation: 38 Geo. 3. c. xxx
- Territorial extent: Great Britain

Dates
- Royal assent: 26 May 1798
- Commencement: 26 May 1798 (Note: The Acts of Parliament (Commencement) Act 1793.)
Other legislation
Amends	Neath Canal Act 1791
Amended by	Vale of Neath Railway Act 1846; SI 1973/96
Relates to	Neath Canal (Cnel Bach) (Repeal of Local Enactments) Order 1992

Status: Amended

Text of statute as originally enacted

There was no immediate pressure to extend the canal to Giant's Grave, as access to Neath for coastal vessels of up to 200 long tons (200 t) had been improved in 1791 by the construction of the Neath Navigable Cut. However, a second Neath Canal Act, the Neath Canal Navigation Act 1798 (38 Geo. 3. c. xxx) was passed on 26 May 1798, to authorise an extension of about 2.5 miles (4.0 km) to Giant's Grave, where better facilities for transferring goods to seagoing vessels were available. Thomas Dadford again surveyed the route, but Edward Price from Gofilon acted as engineer. This part of the canal was financed by Lord Vernon, although he was also paid £600 for his Penrhiwtyn canal, which became part of the main line. The extension was completed on 29 July 1799, and terminated at a basin close to Giant's Grave Pill. Flood gates on the canal enabled water to be released into the pill to scour it of silt. The total cost of the project was about £40,000, which included 19 locks and a number of access tramways. Between 1815 and 1842, additional docks and wharfs were built at Giant's Grave, extending the canal slightly, and the canal was extended to Briton Ferry by the construction in 1832 of the Jersey Canal, which was about 0.6 miles (1 km) long, and was built without an Act of Parliament by the Earl of Jersey. Another short extension was made around 1842. The final length of the canal was 13.5 miles (21.7 km).

From the northern terminus, a tramway connected the canal to iron works at Aberdare and Hirwaun. This was built in 1803, and included an incline just north of Glynneath, which was powered by a high-pressure Trevithick steam engine. The Tappenden brothers had bought into the iron industry in 1802, and built the tramway because of high tolls on the Glamorganshire Canal, but by 1814 they were bankrupt, and had no further connections with the canal.

=== Operation ===
Mineral resources near the top end of the canal included ironstone, which was normally extracted by scouring. This caused problems for the canal, as silt was deposited in the feeders and the top pounds. The Fox family, who were based at Neath Abbey, but who were scouring ironstone further up the valley, agreed to construct a new feeder in 1807 to mitigate the problem. Protests made to the Tappendens, who were scouring at Pen-rhiw and Cwm Gwrelych, were less successful. As the pounds were silting up, the company took legal action in 1811. The court found in their favour, recognising that the canal would soon be useless unless something was done.

Trade steadily grew. Three small private branches were built to serve the industries of the valley. Near the top of the canal, a branch was constructed in 1800, which ran towards Maesmarchog, and was connected to collieries by nearly 1 mile (1.6 km) of tramroad. At Aberclwyd, a branch built in 1817 served the Cnel Bach limekiln on the river bank. Below Neath, a 550-yard (500 m) branch left the main line at Court Sart to connect to a tramroad serving the collieries at Eskyn. Although there are no figures for the tonnage carried, apart from a mention of 90,000 tons of coal in 1810, receipts increased from £2,117 in 1800 to £6,677 in 1830. Subscribers had paid a total of £107.50 for their shares, and dividends were paid from 1806, rising from £2 in 1806 to £18 in 1840. Based on the receipts, it has been estimated that some 200,000 tons of coal were carried when trade was at its peak, supplemented by iron, ironstone and fire clay.

Facilities at Giant's Grave improved, and included jetties to enable ships' ballast to be landed and dumped, rather than being thrown overboard. This latter approach had caused problems at Newport for the Monmouthshire and Brecon Canal, where ballast had been thrown into the river, and at Cardiff for the Glamorganshire Canal, where it had been thrown into the canal basin. Efforts were also made to improve the facilities at Neath. From 1818, a Harbour Board was established, and banks of copper slag, marked with buoys, were used to confine the channel. This enabled ships of over 300 tons to reach Neath quays on spring tides, although on neap tides Giant's Grave still had to be used. From 1824, when the connection to the Tennant Canal opened, much of the trade crossed the river and passed down the western bank to the port of Swansea.

== Glan-y-wern Canal ==
The Glan-y-wern Canal was built to connect Richard Jenkins' colliery at Glan-y-wern with the River Neath at Trowman's Hole, an inlet across the mud flats from the main channel of the river Neath, which was later known as Red Jacket Pill. Jenkins obtained a lease to build it from Lord Vernon on 14 August 1788, but died on the same day. Edward Elton took over management of the colliery, and the canal was constructed by 1790, although there was no actual connection to the river. At Red Jacket, cargos were transhipped from the small boats used on the canal to larger vessels in the pill, which was tidal. The canal remained in use for about 20 years. Elton became bankrupt and died in 1810 after which Lord Vernon, who had leased the land on which the canal was built to Elton, placed a distraint on the wharves at Red Jacket and on the barges and it became disused.

George Tennant incorporated the southern section into his Tennant Canal. The northern branch over the Crymlyn Bog was derelict by 1918. It branches northwards in Crymlyn Burrows and terminates at the Crymlyn Bog nature reserve, now a Site of Special Scientific Interest (SSSI). The SSSI covers an area of 692 acres (280 ha), and has been designated because of the presence of fen and wet woodland habitats. It is also a Ramsar site and a Special Area of Conservation. Rare flora and fauna include slender cottongrass, the fen raft spider, and groupings of rare and scarce invertebrates. Crymlyn Bog is now one of NRW's Lifequake Projects, and the Glan-y-wern Canal is scheduled to be cleared of overgrowth to improve drainage. Following this it will be linked to the Tennant Canal by a bridge, opening up access across the site. https://naturalresourceswales.gov.uk/about-us/news-blog-and-statements/news/lifequake-project-launch/?lang=en

== The Tennant Canal ==
George Tennant, born in 1765 and the son of a solicitor in Lancashire, moved to the area in 1816, after he had bought the Rhydings estate. The Glan-y-wern Canal was unused at the time, following Lord Vernon's distraint, but Tennant, who had no previous experience with canals, decided to lease it, enlarge it and extend it. He planned to make it suitable for barges of 30 to 35 long tons (30 to 36 t), which would gain access to the river Neath through a lock at Red Jacket. Where the canal turned northwards across Crymlyn Bog, he would extend it to the west, to terminate at a lock into the River Tawe, near Swansea harbour. He believed that Swansea docks would provide a better shipping point than Neath or Giant's Grave, and hoped that the canal would encourage the development of the corridor through which it ran. He attempted to gain support for the scheme from local landowners, but when none was forthcoming, he decided to fund the project himself. Lord Vernon's estate had been inherited by the Earl of Jersey in 1814, and so Tennant leased the Glan-y-wern Canal from him.

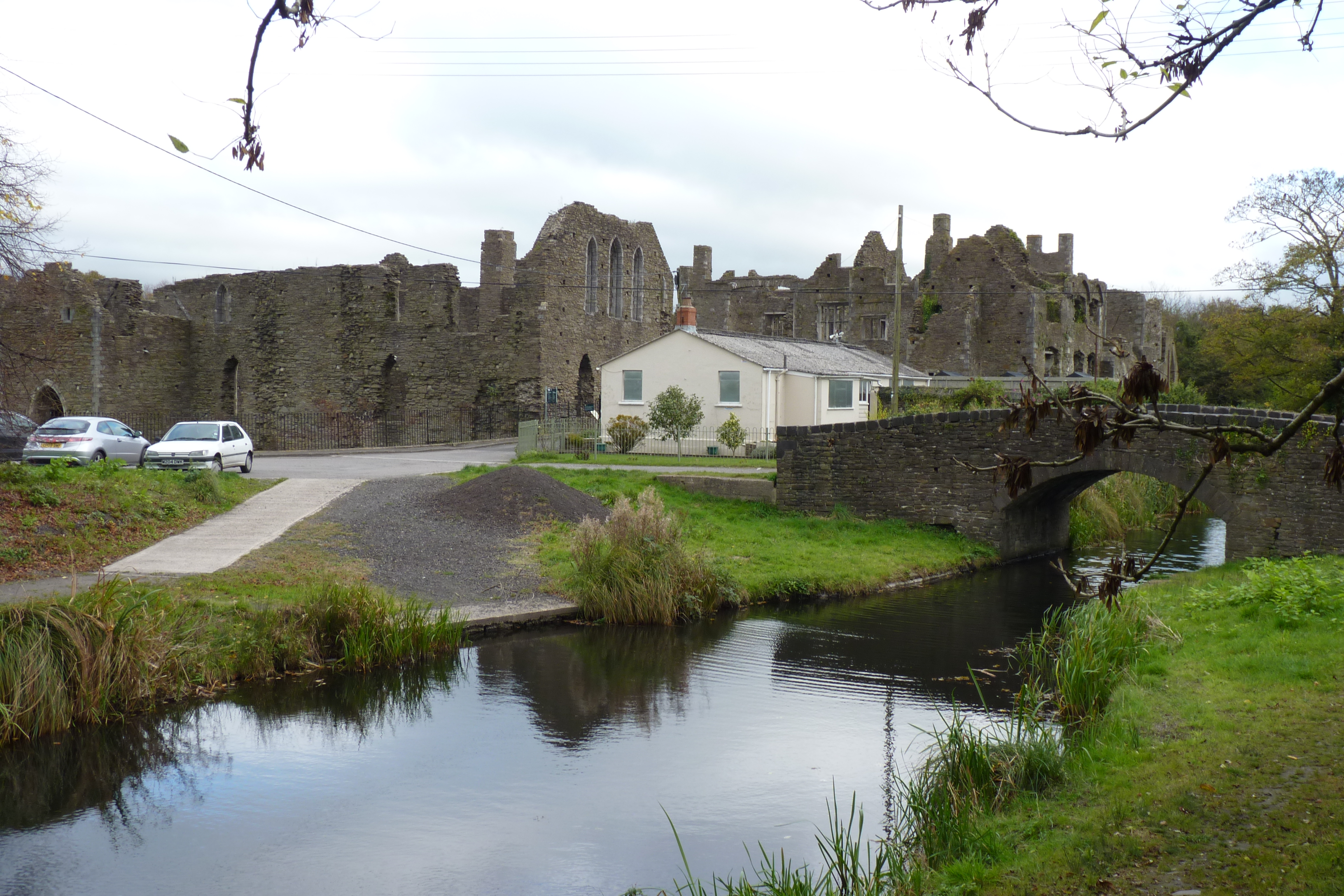
The Tennant Canal, beside the 12th century Neath Abbey

Work started in 1817, under the direction of the engineer William Kirkhouse, and the canal was completed by autumn 1818, running from near the east pier on the River Tawe at Swansea to the River Neath at Red Jacket. The canal was built to a grander scale than originally intended, and could be navigated by barges of 50 to 60 long tons (51 to 61 t). The main line was 4 miles (6.4 km) long, and the 1.4-mile (2.3 km) branch to Glan-y-wern was also reopened, for it supplied regular cargoes of coal. Other goods carried included timber, bark, fire-bricks and sand, but the volume of goods carried was not enough to make a profit. He negotiated with the Neath Canal, who gave him permission to build a lock into the river from their canal, either at Giant's Grave or Court Sart pill, but working canal boats across a tidal river would not have been ideal, and he did not build the lock.

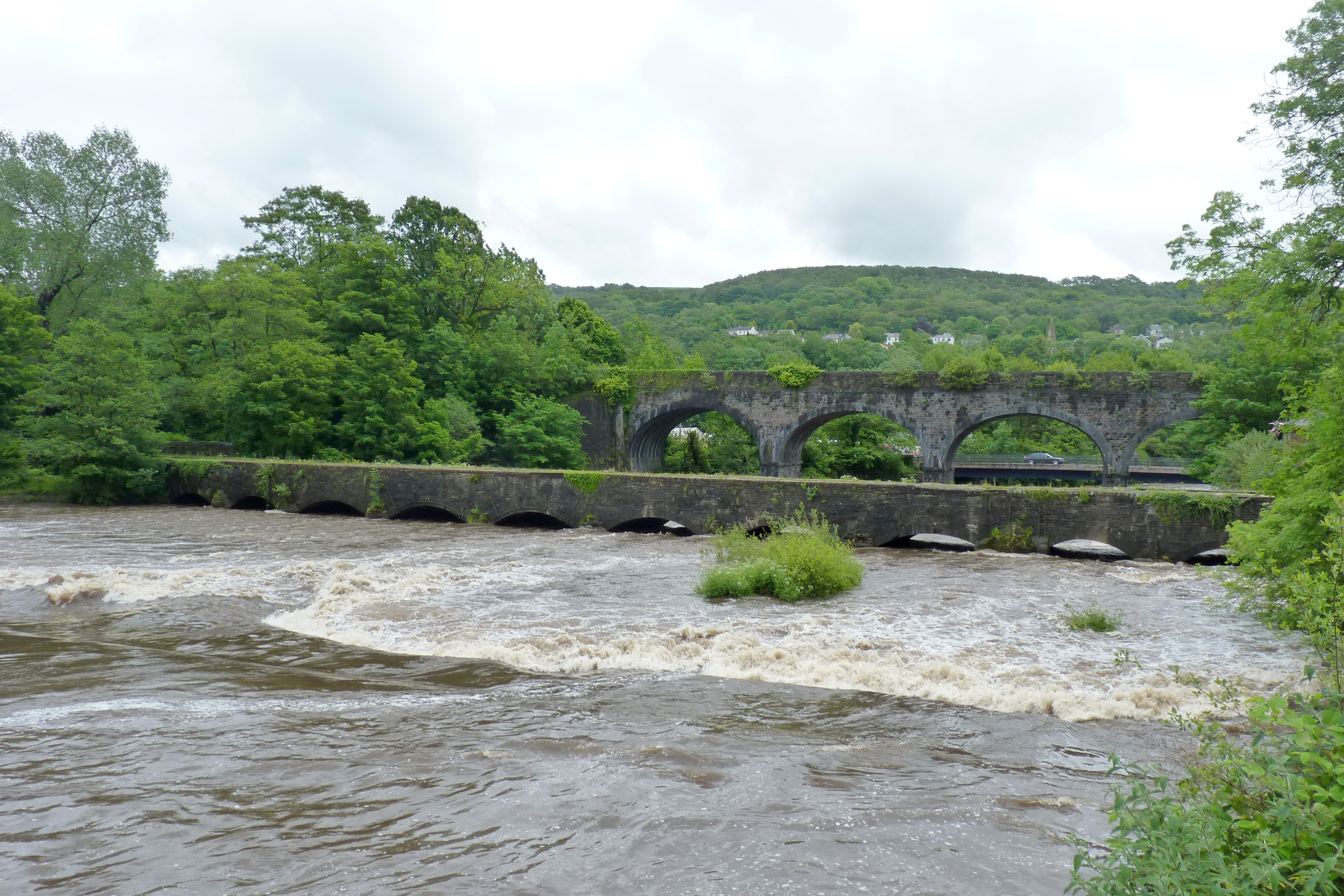
The Aberdulais Aqueduct carried the Tennant Canal over the river Neath, near the Aberdulais Tin Works

Instead, he decided to build an extension to link up with the Neath Canal basin at Aberdulais. Again he sought support from local landowners, including Lord Jersey, Lord Dynevor and the Duke of Beaufort, but again none was forthcoming. He decided to build it as a private canal, without an act of Parliament, and work started in 1821. Engineering problems were experienced near Neath Abbey, where a 500-yard (460 m) cutting was required through what appeared to be quicksand. Eventually, an inverted masonry arch had to be built to contain the canal and stop the sand collapsing. The lack of an act of Parliament to authorise the canal proved to be a problem in April 1821, when L. W. Dillwyn refused permission for Tennant to cut through his land to pass under the Swansea road. In February 1822, Dillwyn obtained an injunction against Tennant, who then attempted to change Dillwyn's opinion by sending a stream of important people to argue his case. Finally, in the autumn, Tennant offered the Neath Canal terms for the use of the junction which were so favourable to them that they accepted. Dillwyn, who was a Neath Canal shareholder, was sent a conciliatory letter and eventually agreed to negotiate with Tennant, whom he described as "that terrible plague Mr. Tennant." The final section included the only lock on the main line, which was followed by a 340-foot (100 m) ten-arched aqueduct across the River Neath, and the junction with the Neath Canal. The total length of the canal, when it was opened on 13 May 1824, was 8.5 miles (13.7 km), and it had cost around £20,000, which did not include the price of the land or of the harbour at Port Tennant.

At the Swansea end, Tennant built a sea-lock, so that boats could enter Fabian Bay, and named the area Port Tennant. His terminus was destroyed when the Prince of Wales Dock was constructed by the Swansea Harbour Trust in 1881. It occupied all of the area which had been Fabian Bay, and so a lock was constructed to enable boats to reach tidal water by passing through the dock, and a wharf for the canal was constructed at the eastern end of the dock. Tennant's wharf was again destroyed in 1898, when the dock was extended. Wharfage was provided for the canal along the entire southern side of the extension, but no lock was built to allow canal boats to enter the dock, even though the act of Parliament made provision for one. A new branch of the canal was built in 1909, which included a lock into the newly constructed Kings Dock, where a lay-by berth was provided on its north side.

Sometime before 1876 another branch was built along the south-western edge of the Crymlyn Bog to transport coal from a mine at Tir-isaf.

=== Operation ===
Prior to its opening, Tennant estimated that the canal would carry 99,994 tons per year, and generate £7,915 in income. Traffic built up, and by the 1830s, annual tonnage was around 90,000 tons, but revenues were less than anticipated, and produced a profit of about £2,500 per year. Initially, it was known as the Neath and Swansea Junction Canal, but by 1845 it had become known as the Tennant Canal. The water was 5 feet (1.5 m) deep between Red Jacket and Aberdulais, and 7 feet (2.1 m) deep from Red Jacket to Swansea harbour. This provided a large reservoir of water, which was used to scour the tidal basin at Port Tennant. Boats typically carried 25 tons, which allowed them to work on the Neath Canal as well. Several short branches were built, including one to the Vale of Neath Brewery which opened in 1839 and was privately funded by the brewery. In the same year, the Glan-y-wern Canal was dredged and re-opened.

Goods carried were mainly coal and culm, but also included timber, iron ore, sand, slag and copper ore, with smaller amounts of foodstuffs and general merchandise. Establishment of industries at Port Tennant, which included Charles Lambert's copperworks in the 1850s and a patent fuel works in the 1860s, resulted in increased traffic of coal, from both Glan-y-wern and Tir-isaf collieries. Tir-isaf was served by a 1-mile (1.6 km) branch built in 1863 by the Earl of Jersey, but leased to the Tennants. Traffic figures reached 225,304 tons in 1866, and then gradually declined after that, but this provided a steady revenue until 1895. The river lock at Red Jacket had a chequered history. Once the line to Aberdulais basin had been opened, it was barely used, and Tennant thought about removing it in 1832. However, it was back in use some time later, and was unused again in the 1880s, only to be rebuilt in 1898.

== Demise ==
The canals faced competition from the Vale of Neath Railway after 1851, but remained profitable until the early 1880s, in the case of the Neath Canal, and the 1890s for the Tennant. An unusual aspect of the Tennant's success was that tolls were maintained, although tonnage dropped. Most canals at this time made significant cuts to tolls in an attempt to remain competitive with the railways. After 1883, the Neath Canal carried small amounts of silica and gunpowder, but traffic had virtually ceased by 1921. Navigation on the Neath Canal came to an end in 1934, and on the Tennant Canal soon afterwards. However, most of the infrastructure was maintained as the canals supplied water to local industries.

When the Glynneath bypass was built in the 1970s, the canal was culverted above Ysgwrfa lock, to allow the road to be straightened, and reduced in width beyond that, to allow the road to be widened. Above Pentremalwed lock, the road was built over the canal bed, and all traces have gone. This road was superseded by the A465 dual carriageway when it opened in 1996, and has become the B4242 road. The part which covered the final section of the canal is no longer a road, although the dual carriageway runs over the site of the Glynneath basin.

At Port Tennant, the course of the canal has been covered over by railways, roads and other facilities of the port, but continues to supply water to the Prince of Wales dock through a large culvert, which helps to maintain water levels in the docks. The Tennant canal is still owned by the Coombe-Tennant family.

== Restoration ==
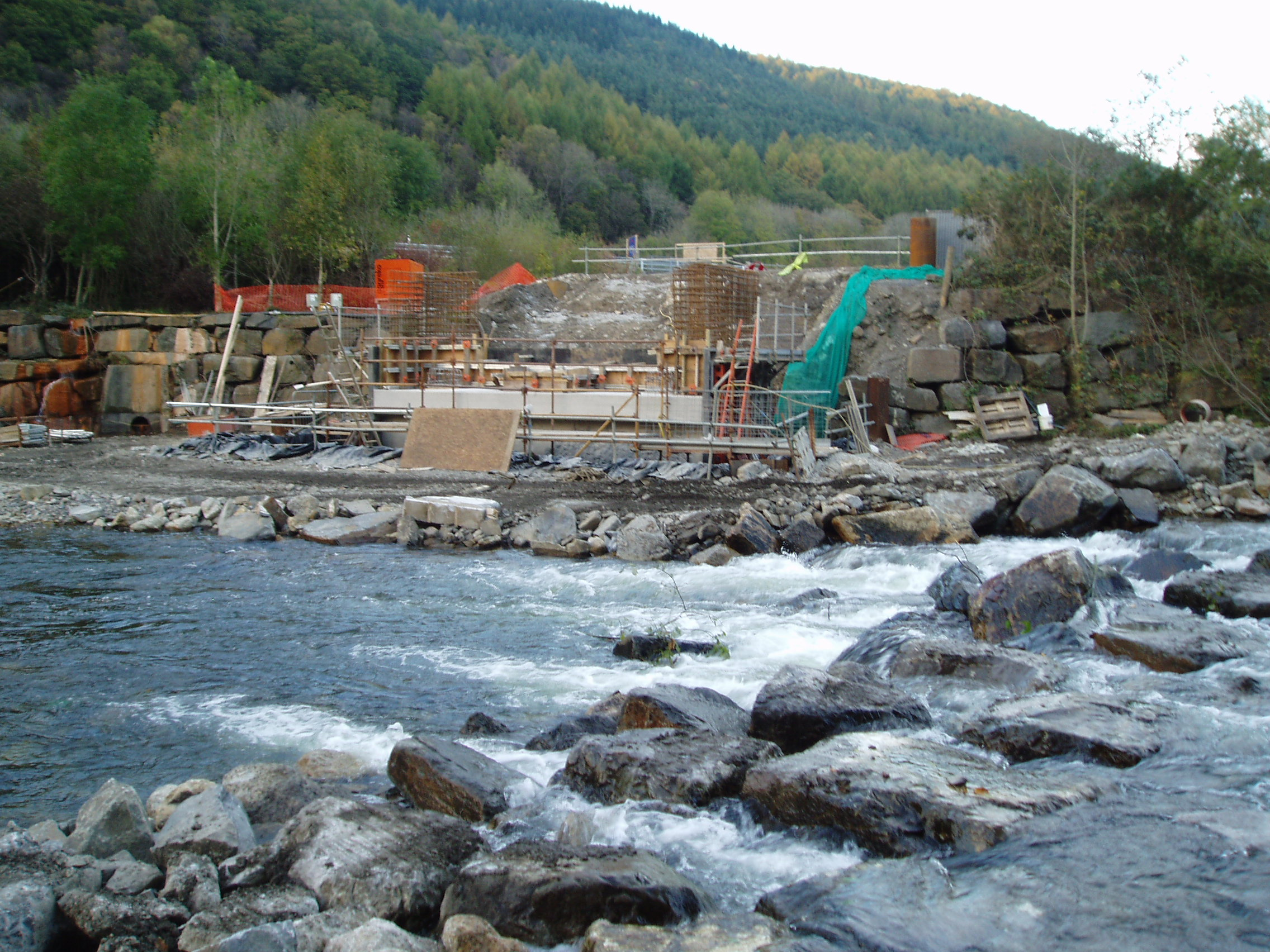
Construction of the west pier to support the new Ynysbwllog aqueduct

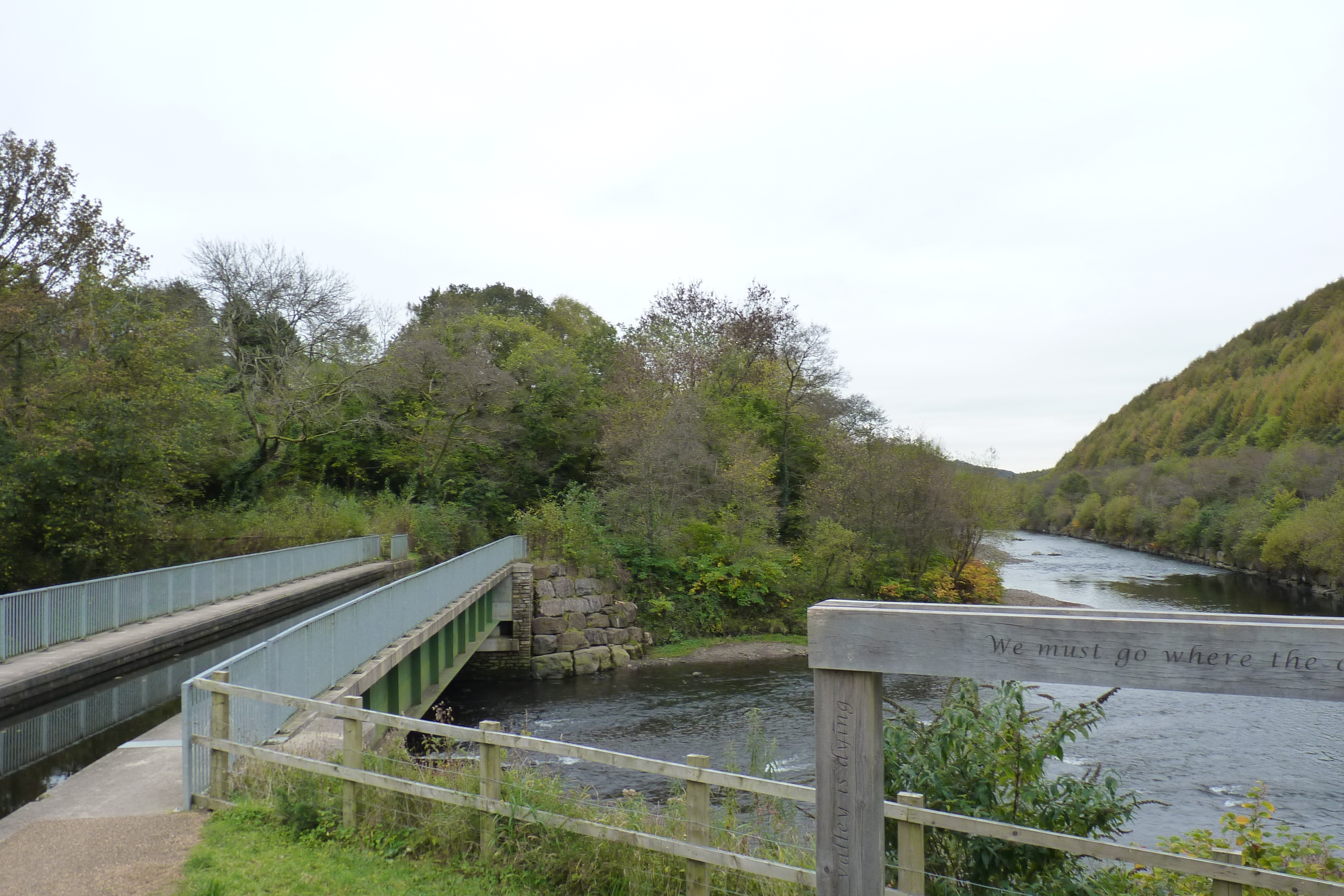
The completed Ynysbwllog aqueduct, carrying the Neath canal over the river Neath

The canals are the subject of active restoration projects. Local interest resulted in the formation of the Neath and Tennant Canals Preservation Society in 1974, to promote restoration of the canal, and carry out clearance and repairs using volunteers. In 2006 it was renamed the Neath and Tennant Canals Trust. They have worked alongside the two canal companies, Neath Port Talbot Council, and a wide range of funders and bodies working for regeneration of the Neath valley, to enable significant sections of the canals to return to use.

=== North-eastern section ===
From 1974 to 1990 the canal benefited from job creation schemes run by the Manpower Services Commission and Youth Training Scheme to work on the northern section from Resolven to Ysgwrfa. By 1990 there was 3.5 miles (5.6 km) of navigable canal, including 7 restored locks and a slipway at Resolven basin. It received a 1998 Europa Nostra award for the quality of the work, and a Civic Trust Award in 1992. The £4 million project was jointly funded by the Welsh Office and the Prince of Wales Trust. The Rheola aqueduct in the middle of this section was refurbished by the Canals Society in 1990. The stream that is now carried under the canal had previously been carried over it in a cast iron trough, but was diverted through a channel cut across the canal bed after high flows overtopped the trough. This required the construction of a new aqueduct, and once completed, the Canals Society launched their trip boat, named Thomas Dadford, on 12 July 1990, to provide canal trips for the public. The Enfys also provided boat trips for the Enfys Trust from the Tŷ Banc former lock-keepers cottage at Resolven, until 2008.

=== South-western section ===
In 1993 the stretch of canal from Abergarwed locks to Tyn-yr-Heol lock at Tonna was polluted when iron-bearing water began discharging from a mine adit of the Ynysarwed coal mine. This turned the water orange, and deposited ferruginous sediment along the canal. A treatment plant and reedbeds were installed to clean the mine water, and this £1.6 million project was commissioned in 1999.

In 2000 the Thomas Dadford canal boat was transferred from the northern to the southern section, and began running boat trips from Neath town centre. Initially these could only run as far as Tonna. A £2.7 million project involving staged draining of the polluted sections enabled the dredging and removal of 65,000 tons of polluted sediment, and rebuilding of much of the infrastructure. This extended the navigable section north-east past Aberdulais basin to Lock Machin, a stretch of 3 miles (5 km).

To extend the canal further to the north-east, a £1.6 million project was funded by the European Union Objective 1 project, the Welsh Assembly and Neath Port Talbot Council. This included complete replacement of the Ynysbwllog aqueduct, part of which had been washed away in a flood in 1979. The commercial role of the canal at that time was to provide water to industries near Swansea, so the water flow had been maintained by replacing the missing arch with pipes. 20 years later a steel footbridge was built to reinstate the towpath. Finally, the canal itself was taken over a new aqueduct, completed in March 2008. The 35-yard (32 m) plate girder aqueduct is believed to be the longest single span aqueduct in the UK. It is 23 feet (7.0 m) wide, and includes a footpath on both sides of the navigation channel. A new car park and slipway were provided from the B4242, and the Clun locks were renovated, to give 6 miles (9.7 km) of navigable canal from central Neath to Abergarwen. Following improvements, the towpath between Briton Ferry and Tonna has become a cycle route, in conjunction with Sustrans, the sustainable transport charity.

=== Plans ===
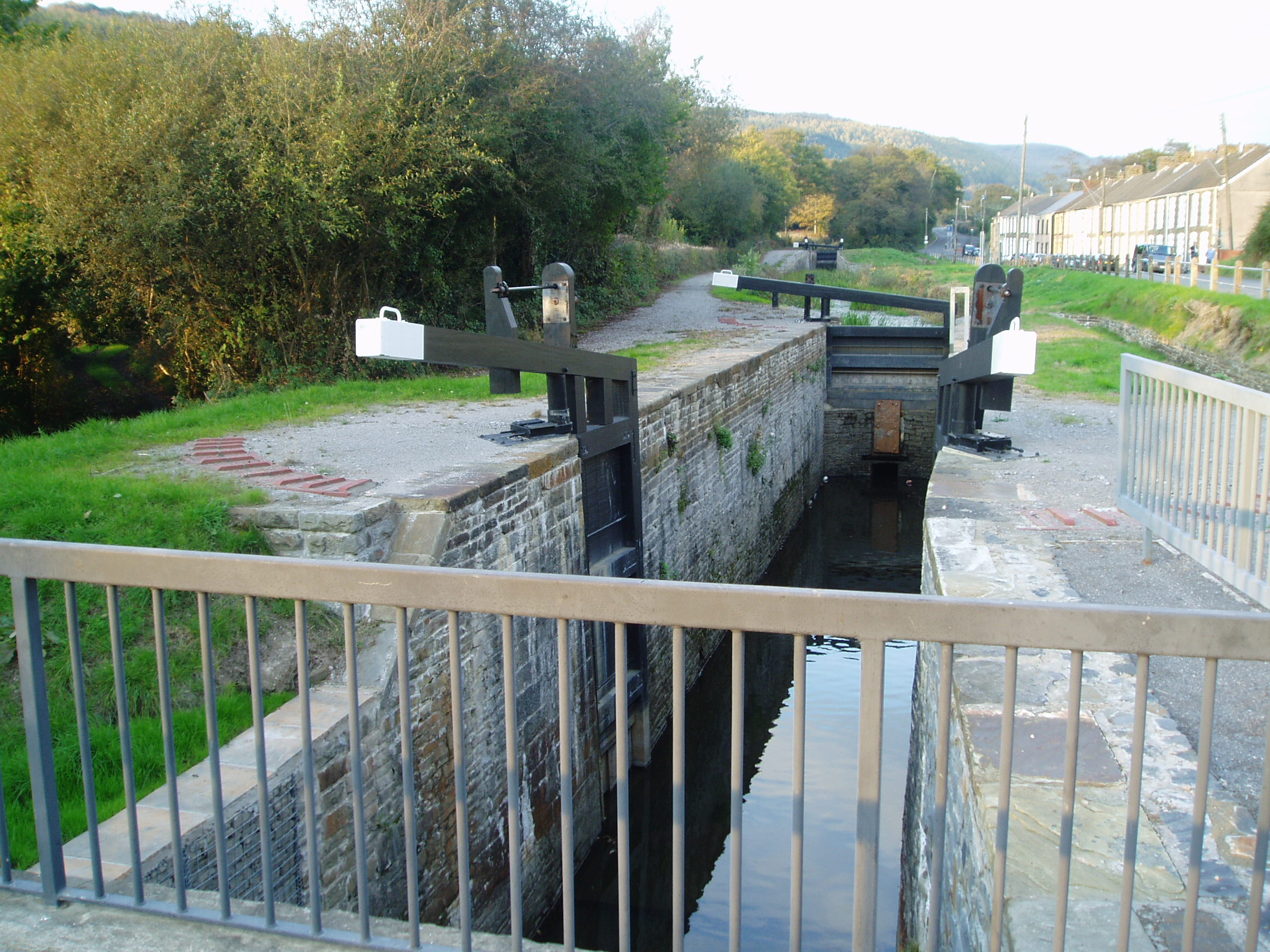
The chamber of the newly restored Clun Isaf lock

Several obstacles remain before the canal restoration can be completed. To join the two navigable sections a new bridge would be needed where the canal is culverted under Commercial Road, and the infilled section to Abergarwed would need to be excavated. The original bridge at Commercial Road is buried beneath the new embankment, and so there is sufficient headroom available through the embankment without major alterations to the road level. Rebuilding of the two Abergarwed locks and Resolven lock would then create a single stretch of canal some 10 miles (16 km) long. Extension to the south is blocked by a bridge at water level in Neath, but in 2009 Neath Port Talbot Council commissioned the Prince's Foundation and British Petroleum to investigate options for the regeneration of the Canal Green area, between the river and the railway line, and the proposals suggested that it should be replaced by a lifting or bascule bridge.

The weir which fed the Tennant Canal following damage to the aqueduct and lock was itself damaged in 2015. The management company then negotiated with Natural Resources Wales for permission to pump water from the Riven Nedd into the canal to maintain the contracted supply to the Baglan Energy Plant. In March 2021 the Baglan Energy Plant went into liquidation and the pumps were switched off, as a result no water has been entering the canal at Aberdulais and there are serious concerns about its future as the water level is dropping quite markedly. A number of concerned local residents are trying to get the management company and Natural Resources Wales to take action to remedy the problem before the whole of the canal is seriously damaged.

At Briton Ferry, the canal ends under the M4 motorway at a scrapyard, but there are plans to refurbish Brunel's Briton Ferry dock, just to the south, and a short extension to it would provide a good terminus. In Neath itself, a masterplan for the Canal Green area, developing both the river frontage and canal sides, has the potential to provide a canal basin and moorings for Neath.

At the opposite end, near Ysgwrfa, the final five locks before Glynneath have been severed by a realignment of the road and the construction of a culvert, but the road has carried a lot less traffic since the A465 bypass was opened, and could possibly be rerouted along its original course, where the bridge over the canal still exists. The Neath Canal Act 1791 has not been repealed, and so there is still a right of navigation along this section, which should ease the process of reinstating it. A feasibility study in 2008 for Neath Port Talbot Council, Swansea Council and the Welsh Assembly Government looked at various options for the top end, including terminating the canal near the Lamb and Flag public house, south of the final two locks, where there is room for a modest terminus at Chapel Fields. Reinstatement to the original terminus was more problematic, as over 980 yards (900 m) of the canal have been infilled, a community centre has been built over part of the route, and the terminus area is used as a coach park.

At Swansea, the Tennant Canal could be relinked to the Prince of Wales Dock, and hence to the River Tawe, which has become a large marina since the construction of a tidal barrage. This could then provide a link to a restored Swansea Canal. Associated British Ports, who run Swansea Docks, rejected the idea of a canal link in 1997, but since then the Prince of Wales Dock has become the subject of a regeneration scheme, and a route for the canal has been reserved in the planning document. The feasibility of this scheme and a possible route was investigated in a report by the engineers W. S. Atkins published in 2003. A report for Natural Resources Wales by Trilein Ltd. recommended a range of initiatives to better connect the urban areas of the city to the more rural east of the county, including Crymlyn Bog. The reconnection of the Tennant Canal to the Prince of Wales Dock was again outlined in that report.

== Canals in popular culture ==
The opening of the Tennant Canal in 1824 inspired Elizabeth Davies, who owned a lollipop-shop in Neath, to write a 19-verse poem, which was published by Filmer Fagg of Swansea.

== Points of interest ==
Point	Coordinates (Links to map resources)	OS Grid Ref	Notes
Glynneath basin	51.7449°N 3.6200°W	SN882063	terminus
Ysgwrfa lock	51.7365°N 3.6519°W	SN860054	canal extant below here
Resolven basin	51.7144°N 3.6991°W	SN827031	end of restored section
Abergarwed locks	51.7052°N 3.7169°W	SN814021	derelict section
Ynysarwed treatment plant	51.7015°N 3.726°W	SN808017	end of derelict section
Ynysbwllog aqueduct	51.6958°N 3.7329°W	SN803010	reinstated 2008
Aberdulais basin	51.6801°N 3.7748°W	SS773994	Jn with Tennant Canal
Neath basin	51.6656°N 3.8035°W	SS753978	southern limit of restored section
Melincryddan wharf	51.6574°N 3.8152°W	SS745969	
Giants Grave wharf	51.6381°N 3.8277°W	SS736948	
Briton Ferry basin	51.6303°N 3.8303°W	SS734939	filled in
Neath Abbey cutting	51.6587°N 3.8344°W	SS732971	
Red Jacket pill	51.6362°N 3.8454°W	SS723946	end of Glan-y-wern Canal
Crymlyn Junction	51.6263°N 3.8785°W	SS700936	
End of Glan-y-wern Canal	51.6424°N 3.8893°W	SS693954	
Swansea docks	51.6201°N 3.9099°W	SS678929	end of watered section

== Rail access ==
Neath railway station on the South Wales Main Line.

== See also ==
- Canals of the United Kingdom
- History of the British canal system
- Tennant Canal Association

== Bibliography ==
- Cumberlidge, Jane (2009). Inland Waterways of Great Britain (8th Ed.). Imray Norie Laurie and Wilson. ISBN 978-1-84623-010-3.
- Hadfield, Charles (1967). The Canals of South Wales and the Border. David and Charles. ISBN 978-0-7153-4027-1.
- Ludgate, Martin (January 2010). "Restoration: Neath and Tennant Canals". Canal Boat. Canal Boat Magazine. ISSN 1362-0312.
- Nicholson (2006). Nicholson Guides Vol 4: Four Counties and the Welsh Canals. Harper Collins Publishers Ltd. ISBN 978-0-00-721112-8.
- Potter, Hugh (August 2007). "Canals of the Valleys". Waterways World. ISSN 0309-1422.
- Priestley, Joseph (1831). "Historical Account of the Navigable Rivers, Canals, and Railways, of Great Britain". Archived from the original on 4 March 2016.
- Rees, D Ben (1975). Chapels in the Valley. Ffynnon Press. ISBN 978-0-902158-08-5.
- Squires, Roger (2008). Britain's restored canals. Landmark Publishing. ISBN 978-1-84306-331-5.
- "The Neath and Tennant Canals Trust".
