= List of public art in Neath Port Talbot =

Map of Wales with Neath Port Talbot highlighted

This is a list of public art in Neath Port Talbot in south Wales. Neath Port Talbot is a county borough and one of the unitary authority areas of Wales. This list applies only to works of public art on permanent display in an outdoor public space and does not, for example, include artworks in museums.

== Bryn ==
Image	Title / subject	Location and coordinates	Date	Artist / designer	Type	Material	Dimensions	Designation	Wikidata	Notes
	War memorial	Bryn			Obelisk	Red granite				

== Cadoxton ==
Image	Title / subject	Location and coordinates	Date	Artist / designer	Type	Material	Dimensions	Designation	Wikidata	Notes
	War memorial	Cadoxton-juxta-Neath	1922		Celtic cross on stepped base	Stone				

== Clyne ==
Image	Title / subject	Location and coordinates	Date	Artist / designer	Type	Material	Dimensions	Designation	Wikidata	Notes
	War memorial	Clyne	1922		Celtic cross on stepped base	Stone				

== Cwmafan ==
Image	Title / subject	Location and coordinates	Date	Artist / designer	Type	Material	Dimensions	Designation	Wikidata	Notes
	Statue	Forest trail overlooking Cwmafan	2010		Steel statues with sound	Steel				Depicts local actors Rob Brydon and Richard Burton and the head ranger of Afan Forest Park, Dick Wagstaff.

== Margam ==
Image	Title / subject	Location and coordinates	Date	Artist / designer	Type	Material	Dimensions	Designation	Wikidata	Notes
	War memorial	St Mary's Abbey Church churchyard, Margam	c.1920s		Polygonal cross	Stone		Grade II	Q29500414	

== Neath ==
Image	Title / subject	Location and coordinates	Date	Artist / designer	Type	Material	Dimensions	Designation	Wikidata	Notes
More images	Statue of Howel Gwyn	Victoria Gardens, Neath	1889	Mario Raggi	Statue on pedestal	Bronze and granite	5.48m high			
	Gorsedd stones	Victoria Gardens, Neath	1918		Stone circle	Stone				Erected to mark the 1918 National Eisteddfod of Wales
	Gnoll Gates war memorial	Gnoll Estate County Park, Neath	c.1921		Gates and pillars with plaques	Iron, marble & stone with gilded scrollwork		Grade II	Q29490159	
	Spanish Civil War Memorial	Victoria Gardens, Neath	1994		Incised monolith	Stone				
	War Memorial	Gnoll Country Park			Tablet and plinth	Stone				

== Pontardawe ==
Image	Title / subject	Location and coordinates	Date	Artist / designer	Type	Material	Dimensions	Designation	Wikidata	Notes
	War memorial	Junction of Holly Street & Herbert St., Pontardawe	1923	Ernest E Morgan	Obelisk with plaques	Granite and bronze	7m high	Grade II	Q29504259	

== Port Talbot ==
Image	Title / subject	Location and coordinates	Date	Artist / designer	Type	Material	Dimensions	Designation	Wikidata	Notes
More images	Port Talbot War Memorial	Memorial Park, Port Talbot	1925	Louis Frederick Roslyn	Statue on pedestal with relief plaques	Bronze and granite		Grade II*	Q17740925	
	Byass Works War Memorial	Vivian Park, Port Talbot			Pillar with circle cross	Concrete		Grade II	Q29500015	Erected by Robert B Byass & Company.
More images	The Man of Steel	Port Talbot		Sebastien Boyesen	Statue on column	Steel				
More images	The Mortal Coil	Port Talbot	2002	Sebastien Boyesen	Statue & sculpture	Bronze				
	Kite Tail sculpture	Aberavon Beach, Port Talbot	2007	Andrew Rowe	Abstract sculpture	Steel	12m high			

== Resolven ==
Image	Title / subject	Location and coordinates	Date	Artist / designer	Type	Material	Dimensions	Designation	Wikidata	Notes
	War memorial	Village Centre, Resolven	1925		Obelisk	Stone				

== Seven Sisters ==
Image	Title / subject	Location and coordinates	Date	Artist / designer	Type	Material	Dimensions	Designation	Wikidata	Notes
	War memorial	Seven Sisters	1921		Statue on plinth	Marble and granite		Grade II	Q29504818	

== Tonna ==
Image	Title / subject	Location and coordinates	Date	Artist / designer	Type	Material	Dimensions	Designation	Wikidata	Notes
	War memorial	Grounds of St Anne's Church, Tonna			Inscribed plaque and wall	Marble and stone				
