= A4107 road =

Road in Wales

Coordinates: 51.65485°N 3.63128°W

A4107

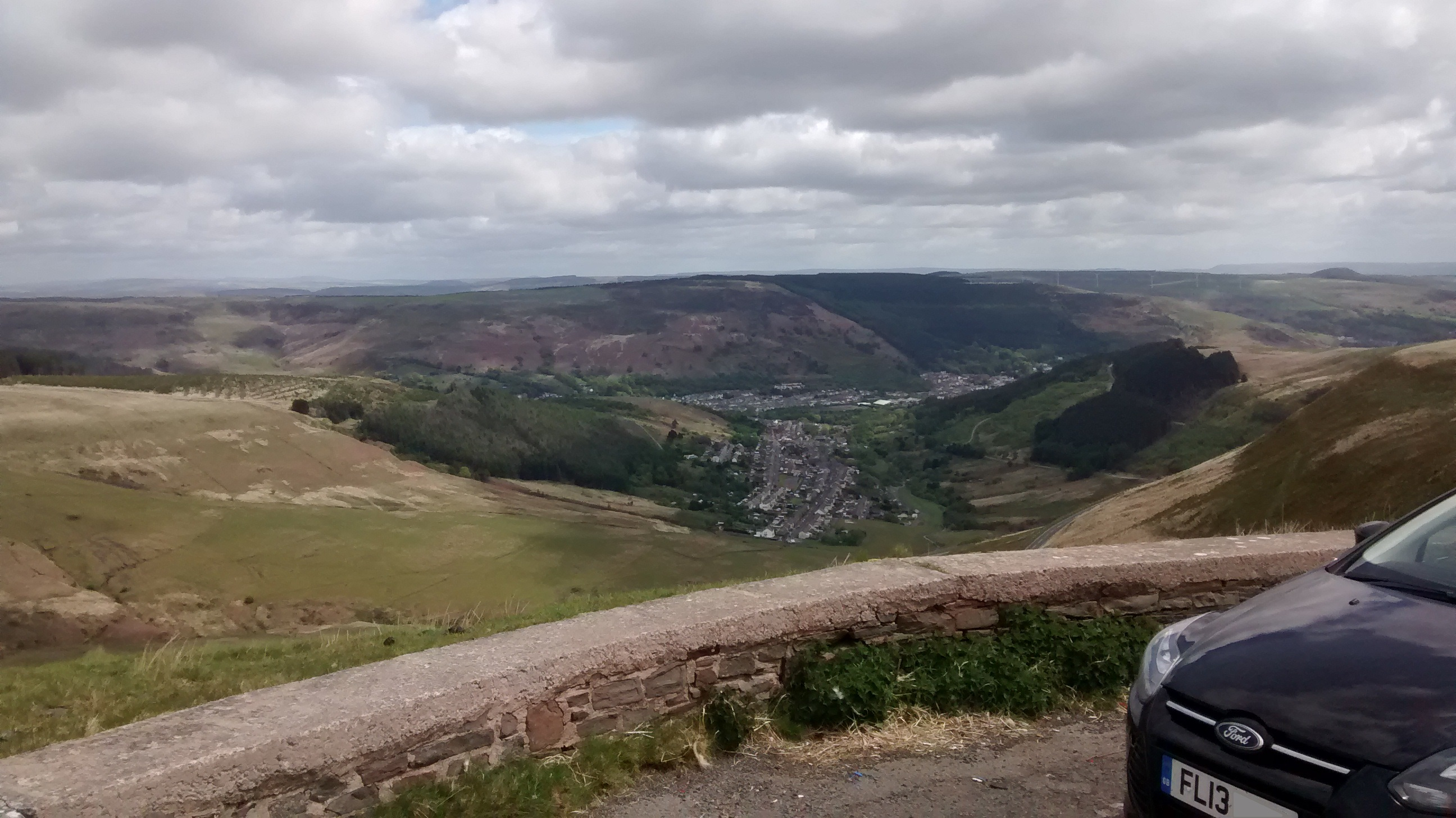
- View over the Treorchy area from the A4107

Route information
- Length: 15.4 mi (24.8 km)

Major junctions
- Southeast end: Port Talbot
- A48; M4 A4063 A4061
- Northwest end: A4061 near Cwmparc

Location
- Country: United Kingdom
- Constituent country: Wales
- Primary destinations: Port Talbot

Road network
- Roads in the United Kingdom; Motorways; A and B road zones

The A4107 road is an A road in Neath Port Talbot County Borough, Wales. It begins in Port Talbot and heads up the Afan Valley in a north easterly direction. It then continues over the moors eastwards until it connects with the A4061 road south west of Treorchy in the Rhondda Valley.

== Route ==
The A4107 starts at Port Talbot at traffic lights on the A48 road, the main route from Cardiff to Swansea before the M4 motorway was opened. The A4107 passes under the motorway and then continues in a roughly northeasterly direction up the valley of the River Afan, with the river on its left. It leaves Cwmavon to its left before passing a junction with the B4287, Neath road, which branches off to the left. After this the road swings round to the right and passes through wooded country. The road is climbing more steeply now and passes the Afan Forest Park to the right, before emerging onto grassy hillsides with boulders and rocky outcrops.

Turning towards the east, it passes through the hamlets of Pontrhydyfen and Duffryn to Cymmer. Here the A4063 road to Bridgend branches off to the right. Continuing over the tops of the moors, the road passes the hamlets of Croeserw, Abergwynfi and Blaengwynfi, and the summits of Mynydd Caerau 536 m (1,759 ft) and Mynydd Llangeinwyr 571 m (1,873 ft) on the right. The road begins to descend now, there are a couple of hairpin bends and it terminates at the junction with the A4061 Treorchy to Bridgend road.

== History ==
The A4107 was given that number on 1 April 1925, when the B4284 was upgraded. At the time it was not a through route as it terminated at Abergywnfi. However, there were plans to extend it to provide opportunities for employment in a depressed area, and the Bwlch y Clawdd extension road was duly opened in February 1928.
