= Croeserw =

Village in Neath Port Talbot, Wales

Coordinates: 51.65°N 3.64°W

Croeserw: Welsh: Croeserw
- Location within Neath Port Talbot
- Population: 1,200 c. 1,380
- OS grid reference: SS867953
- Community: Gwynfi and Croeserw
- Principal area: Neath Port Talbot
- Preserved county: West Glamorgan
- Country: Wales
- Sovereign state: United Kingdom
- Post town: Port Talbot
- Postcode district: SA13
- Dialling code: 01639
- Police: South Wales
- Fire: Mid and West Wales
- Ambulance: Welsh
- UK Parliament: Aberafan Maesteg
- Senedd Cymru – Welsh Parliament: Aberavon

School = Croeserw primary school Croeserw is a village of approximately 1,380 inhabitants in Gwynfi and Croeserw, Neath Port Talbot county borough, Wales.

== Location ==
It stands on a hillside in the Afan Valley (also known as Avon) at between 196 and 299 metres above sea level.

== Origins ==
It takes its name from the Croeserw Farm and 'woollen factory', possibly of the Elizabethan period, which was demolished for road widening of the A4107 road in 1982. A stone monument now marks the position where the farm once stood. Croeserw, meaning in the Welsh language 'Crossing-acre' (Croes = Cross/crossing + Erw = acre) refers possibly to the road crossings where the lip of the Afan Valley meets the upper reaches of the Llynfi Valley.

== Amenities ==
Old Croeserw consists of the older buildings and the large cemetery on the hill overlooking the A4107. New Croeserw, higher up the hill, consists mainly of post-war public housing, many of which are now private. A cluster of retail outlets including a post office, a former Co-op supermarket, now family-run, and an older hotel-pub are also located in New Croeserw. There is also an industrial park, and a primary school.

Croeserw is surrounded on all sides by hills and mountains:

- Rhiw Llech Mountain: North of Croeserw, meaning 'Slate Slope Mountain', rises to 390 metres above sea level.
- Gelli Mountain: North-East of Croeserw. Gelli means Grove. The mountain takes its name from the nearby Gelli Farm. The mountain rises to 450m above sea level.
- Caerau Mountain: South-East of Croeserw. Caerau means 'forts'. The mountain takes its name from nearby Caerau. The mountain rises to 556m above sea level.
- Foel Fawr Mountain: West of Croeserw, meaning 'Great Peak', rises to 347m above sea level.

== History ==
A woollen farm has existed in Croeserw since pre-Industrial times. In the 19th century, Old Croeserw was developed as part of the expansion of coal mining into the upper reaches of the Afan Valley. Local mines included Scatton, Avon and Dyffryn coal pits as well as numerous drift mines. In order to meet the energy demand New Croeserw was developed to house mining families to service the burgeoning coal mines. These houses were substantially refurbished by the local authority in the 1980s/1990s.

In 1982 the old Croeserw Farmhouse was demolished. After the mine closures, Croeserw experienced an economic downturn.

Today, the main industries around Croeserw consist of light manufacturing, service sector, retail, forestry and farming. There is also a high level of unemployment and a large part of the population in retirement.

It is hoped that the development of tourism and leisure facilities will provide further employment opportunities. Croeserw is well-served by regular direct bus services to Maesteg and Bridgend, including road links to Port Talbot, Neath, Swansea and the M4.

Recent developments include the Afan Forest Park (also known as Afan Argoed Country Park) Visitor Centre, the South Wales Mining Museum near Cynonville, and the Glyncorrwg Mountain Bike Centre and Ponds.

== Sport ==
=== Football ===
- Croeserw Athletic F.C. based in Croeserw is founded in 2010.

== Transport links ==
1. A4063 road Croeserw to Caerau: to the upper Llynfi valley.
2. A4107 road Croeserw to Cwmavon
3. A4107 Croeserw to The Bwlch yr Afan (meaning Afan Mountain Pass)
4. A4061 road The Bwlch to Treorchy: to the Rhondda Valley.
5. A4061 The Bwlch to Nantymoel: to the Ogmore Valley.

== Windfarms ==
The Welsh Assembly aims to achieve 10% of all energy from renewable energy sources by the year 2010. Under the TAN8 plan, 38% of all potential sites within Wales have been located within Neath Port Talbot.

NPowerRenewables recently completed 16 300 ft windfarm turbines on Ffynnon Oer. Spanish-owned Gamesa plans to build 14 603 ft turbines, four on Blaencorrwg, and 10 on Gelli Mountain, which stands directly above Croeserw. Cardiff-based Eco2 plans to build 4 410 ft turbines on Corrwg Fechan overlooking Glyncorrwg.

There is widespread concern that these constructions will drive away the much-needed tourism in an area that is struggling to get back on its feet. The opposition to these plans is led by Glyncorrwg Action Group, which is also spearheading a drive with local MP Dr Hywel Francis to designate the Afan Valley as an Area of Outstanding Natural Beauty.
