= Aberavon Green Stars RFC =

(Wales) Aberavon Green Stars RFC
- Full name: Aberavon Green Stars Rugby Football Club
- Founded: 1887
- Location: Aberavon, Port Talbot, Sandfields, Wales
- Ground(s): The Pavilion, Darwin Road, Little Warren, SA12 6BS
- Chairman: Terry Cooksley
- President: Matthew Crowley
- Coach(es): Foard Cooksley, Brett Thomas & Chris Leyshon
- Captain: Keiren Mattocks
- League: WRU League 1 West Central
- 2025/26: 2nd
Team kit

Official website
- aberavongreenstars.rfc.wales

Aberavon Green Stars Rugby Football Club is a Welsh rugby union team based in Aberavon, Wales, UK. The club is a member of the Welsh Rugby Union and is a feeder club for the Ospreys. The club was formed by an Irish community and to this day the team keeps a visible and purposeful connection to their Irish roots, seen in the club's name, club house and badge.

== Early years ==
The Green Stars owe their formation to the Irish community near Aberavon Beach and although publications such as Field of Praise state the club was formed as St Joseph's. The club is believed to have started out as the Aberavon Green Stars, but changed their name to St Joseph's during the 1908/09 season. During the 1920s the team began a friendly Christmas Day fixture, a common Welsh club tradition, against Taibach RFC which the opponents usually won.

== Post 1945 ==
Like all Welsh clubs, Aberavon Green Stars disbanded during the Second World War, but in 1946 reformed as Port Talbot Cyms RFC. In 1953 the team reclaimed the name Aberavon Green Stars.

== Club Badge ==
The Brown Stars badge is a shield divided into four quarters each representing a link to Welsh or Irish culture. The two Irish quarters hold a shamrock and an Irish harp. The two Welsh quarters hold the Welsh red dragon and the Prince of Wales's feathers.

== Club honours ==
- WRU Division Five South Central 2007/08 - Champions (beaten P20 W1 D1 L18)
- WRU Division Four South West 2009/10 - Champions (P22 W2 L20

== Youth Team ==
Aberavon Green Stars youth team were very successful during the 2011/2012 season. They won four trophies in all including the Ospreys Division B, Afan nedd Cup, Presidents cup and The Afan Nedd 7's. The first trophy they won was the League. They beat Gorseinan 27-17 to secure the title on Easter Saturday. This landmark also brought up that the Stars had been unbeaten in the league for two years. They then went on to play Division A champions Pontardawe in the Afan Nedd Cup. With Owen Howe kicking a penalty four minutes from the end, the young Stars held onto a 15-13 victory. Two weeks after that the Stars secured a treble by beating Tonmawr 32-17 at the Talbot Athletic Ground. Just to round off the season they also won the Afan Nedd District 7's.
