= Baglan Bay power station =

Power station in Wales

Baglan Bay Power Station
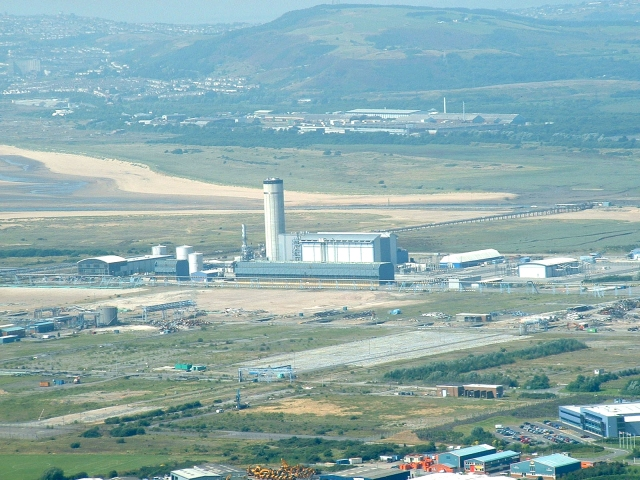
- Baglan Bay Power Station
- Country: Wales, United Kingdom
- Location: Port Talbot
- Coordinates: 51.619735°N 3.829637°W
- Status: Demolished
- Commission date: 2003
- Decommission date: July 2020
- Owner: Baglan Group
- Operator: In receivership

Thermal power station
- Primary fuel: Natural gas
- Combined cycle?: Yes

Power generation
- Nameplate capacity: 525 MW

External links
- Commons: Related media on Commons

Baglan Bay Power Station was a 525 MWe gas-fired power station situated on Baglan Moors just west of Port Talbot in Wales.

== History ==
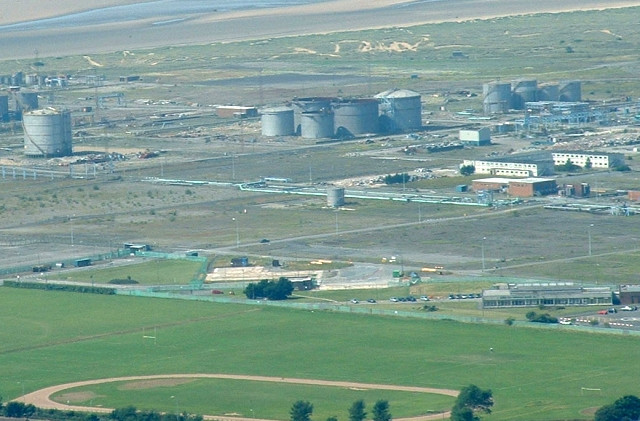
Site of the former BP Baglan Bay plant

The former power station was built on the site of the former BP chemicals plant in September 2003, costing £300 million. Both the Stack and the two Cooling Towers from the BP plant were demolished in October 2003.

At the time of its development, it was considered the most advanced combined-cycle gas turbine (CCGT) facility of its kind, with close to 60% efficiency. It was built by the GE Energy division of General Electric, who later rebranded to GE Power then GE Gas Power.

It was officially opened by Queen Elizabeth II and the Duke of Edinburgh on October 28 2004.

It was sold by GE in October 2012 to a group of financial investors, led by Macquarie Group. After the sale, GE continued to operate the power station under an operations and maintenance (O&M) contract until 2019, when staff at the power plant were transferred to Calon Energy.

In June 2020 the Baglan Group entered administration; the following month, the power station ceased generating electricity. Power was supplied to the Baglan Energy Park, which is home to a large number of other businesses and organisations via the power station's connection to the National Grid. From August 2022, the private wire network was no longer in use, and the businesses on the energy park made arrangements for their own independent power supply.

Following a fire at the site in August 2023, the site was demolished, leaving just the chimney.

== Specification ==
It had a CCGT-type power station that ran on natural gas. It had one General Electric 50 Hz H-class system (9H) gas turbine which achieved a firing temperature well above 2,600 °F (1,430 °C) linked on a single shaft to a heat recovery steam generator and a GE steam turbine. It had black start capability, using a 33 MWe GE LM2500 gas turbine. It connected to the National Grid at 275 kV. It was 60% thermally efficient.

Only six H-System combined-cycle power plants were built and continue to operate commercially, and while one of those plants—the 60 Hz 7H Gas Turbine based at Inland Empire Energy Center—has achieved notable heat rate and NO_{x} emissions parameters, GE does not offer the H-System anymore. They were replaced by HA models.

Retrofitting the power station with a newer HA model remained technically possible; however, as the power station has been demolished, this will never happen.

== See also ==
- Baglan
- Baglan Bay
