= Jeunesse =

Jeunesse is the French word for Youth and may refer to:

- Youth (1934 film)
- The Young One (2016 film)
- Montagne Jeunesse
- Jeunesse Populaire Française
- Gallimard Jeunesse
- Jeunesse Esch
- Europe-Jeunesse
- Jeunesses Patriotes
- Jeunesse Gabonais
- Jeunesse Étudiante Chrétienne
