= Aberavon =

Town in Neath Port Talbot, Wales

Aberavon: Welsh: Aberafan
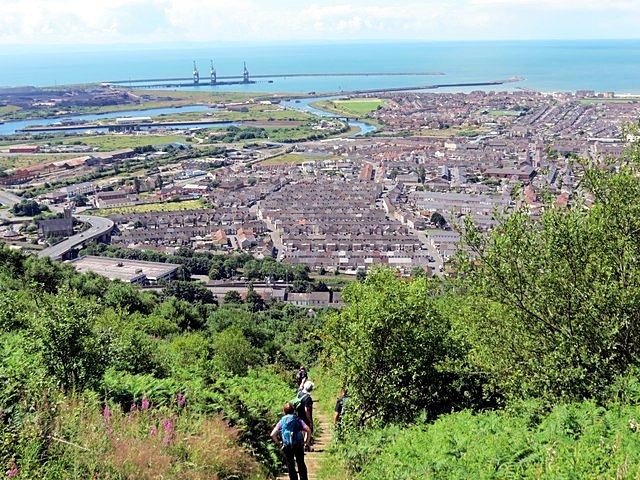
- Aberavon from Mynydd Dinas

- Location within Neath Port Talbot
- Population: 5,452 (2011 census)
- OS grid reference: SS752904
- Principal area: Neath Port Talbot
- Preserved county: West Glamorgan
- Country: Wales
- Sovereign state: United Kingdom
- Post town: PORT TALBOT
- Postcode district: SA12
- Dialling code: 01639
- Police: South Wales
- Fire: Mid and West Wales
- Ambulance: Welsh
- UK Parliament: Aberafan Maesteg
- Senedd Cymru – Welsh Parliament: Aberavon
- Councillors: Scott Bamsey (Plaid Cymru); Steffan ap Dafydd (Labour); Nigel Thomas Hunt (Plaid Cymru)
- List of places UK Wales Neath Port Talbot 51.59943°N 3.80194°W Map of the community

Aberavon (Welsh: Aberafan) is a town and community in Neath Port Talbot county borough, Wales. The town derived its name from being near the mouth of the river Afan, which also gave its name to a medieval lordship. Today it is essentially a district of Port Talbot, covering the central and south western part of the town. Aberavon is also the name of the nearby Blue Flag beach and the parish covering the same area.

== History ==
Little is known about Aberavon before Norman times. Bronze Age remains have been found in the hills behind the town. Roman artifacts have been found near the sea, including when the docks were being built in the 19th century.

About 1090 the invading Normans deposed Iestyn ap Gwrgant, the ruler of Glamorgan. His son, Caradog ab Iestyn, was the only Welsh lord to retain lands in Glamorgan – the area between the Afan and Neath rivers – and he became the first of the Lords of Afan. Caradoc built a castle in Aberafan near the present site of St Mary's Church. This wooden castle was burnt down in 1153 and Caradoc's son, Morgan ap Caradoc, rebuilt the castle in stone. In 1147, Cistercian monks founded the nearby Margam Abbey. In 1241, the Lordship passed to Morgan Fychan. His son, Leisan D'Avene, was the first known by a Norman-style surname. In 1304, Leisian D'Avene adopted the town's first charter. By 1373, the town had passed into the hands of Edward le Despencer, Lord of Glamorgan, and the Lords of Afan had ceased to be.

The English antiquarian John Leland made an extensive journey through Wales c. 1536–1539, of which he recorded an itinerary. He passed through Aberafan, which he describes as a "poor village" surrounded by barren ground, though he also describes the area as heavily wooded, not much of which remains today. He mentions the use of the river mouth as a port, a "haven for ships" as he puts it. His portrayal of Aberafan as a small, struggling village however suggests that the port was not in great use, especially as traffic to and from Margam Abbey would have ceased following its dissolution in 1536.

Tradition has it that when the English Civil War broke out in 1648 Oliver Cromwell tried to seize the town charter as he passed through the town on his way to Pembroke, but it was hidden from him in a chopping block. Aberafan also endured the storm surge of 1607 and the Great Flood of 1768, when the river flowed into St Mary's Church.

Aberavon was the birthplace of Dic Penderyn, a key figure in the Merthyr Rising of 1831. St Mary's Church is the site of his grave. The castle site was built over between 1876 and 1897 and its foundations now lie underneath the streets around the church. There have been reports of a ghost, a white lady seen floating above the castle ruins. The ghost is speculated to be Jane de Afan, the last occupant of Aberavon Castle.

In the 18th century industry began to appear in the area. Industrialists worked with the Talbot family of Margam Castle to divert the bottom of the Afan river to its present bed, and in 1836 opened a new harbour east of the river Afan with the name of "Port Talbot". The following decades saw significant industrial and population growth for Aberafan and the surrounding areas with people coming from North and West Wales, South West England, and Ireland. A new borough of Aberavon came into being in 1861, though at the time it was still smaller than nearby Cwmafan or Taibach. Although there were small local collieries the area had become known for its metalworking industry.

In the 1950s many of the sand dunes of Aberavon Beach disappeared as part of the development of the Sandfields estate, at this time a 1 1/4-mile (2-kilometre) sea wall was built primarily for sea defences. The estate was built to accommodate the growing population, especially the families of workers at the new Port Talbot Steelworks.

From 1832 Aberavon had belonged to the Swansea parliamentary district of boroughs, uniting with Kenfig, Loughor, Neath and Swansea to return one member; from 1918 to 2024 it had its own UK parliament constituency. Starting in 2024 it was part of the Aberafan Maesteg constituency. Its most famous MP was Ramsay MacDonald. Sir Geoffrey Howe, who although born locally never represented the town in the House of Commons, chose as his peerage title Lord Howe of Aberavon. Since 1999 it has had its own Welsh Assembly constituency.

Aberavon hosted the National Eisteddfod in 1932 and 1966.

== Sport ==
Aberavon RFC are a rugby union team, and play in the Welsh Premier Division.

Aberavon Quins RFC are a rugby union club based at Harlequin Road and play their rugby in the WRU Division Two West league.

Aberavon Green Stars RFC are a rugby club based in Sitwell Way Aberavon.

Afan Lido F.C. is a football team, playing in Cymru South.

One of Aberavon's rugby league clubs is called the Aberavon Fighting Irish and play in the Welsh Conference Premier.

Aberavon & Port Talbot Golf Club (now defunct) was founded in 1905. The course closed following WW2 and the land was used for housing.

== Baglan Industrial Park ==
The Baglan Bay Industrial Park lies on a stretch of Baglan Moors in the parish of Aberavon south east of the Baglan Energy Park and immediately northwest of Neath Port Talbot Hospital. It is sandwiched between the M4 Motorway and Afan Way (A4241).

== Government and politics ==
The electoral ward of Aberavon is coterminous with district of Aberavon and is a part of the Welsh parliamentary constituency of Aberavon.

Aberavon is bounded by the wards of Sandfields West and Sandfields East to the southwest; Baglan to the north; Port Talbot to the east and Margam to the south. The ward boundaries can be defined by the roads surrounding it which are the M4 Motorway to the north east; the A4241 to the north west; Afan Way to the southwest and the River Afan to the south east.

The Aberavon ward can be roughly divided into two parts. There is the residential area to the southeastern part of the ward beside the River Afan. The north western area consists of areas of industrial estate land called the Baglan Industrial Park which includes a number of out of town retail premises as well as business and manufacturing premises.

== Nearest places ==
- Sandfields
- Aberavon Beach
- Velindre
- Taibach

== Nearest railway station ==
- Port Talbot Parkway railway station

== Notable people ==
- John James, novelist

== See also ==
- St Joseph's Church, Port Talbot
