= Victoria Gardens =

Victoria Gardens may refer to:

== Locations ==
- Victoria Gardens (Rancho Cucamonga), a retail center in Rancho Cucamonga, California, United States
- Victoria Gardens, Neath, a park in Neath, Wales
- Victoria Gardens, Portland, a park on the Isle of Portland, Dorset, England
- Victoria Gardens Shopping Centre, a shopping mall in Richmond, Victoria, Australia
- Jijamata Udyaan, formerly known as Victoria Gardens, a zoo and a garden in Byculla, Mumbai, India
- Lokmanya Tilak Garden, formerly known as Victoria Garden, a garden in Ahmedabad, India
- The original name of White Hart Field, Bromley, London

== Music ==
- "Victoria Gardens", a song by the group Madness from the 1984 album Keep Moving

== See also ==
- Victoria Garden City, a gated community in Lagos State, Nigeria
- Victoria Tower Gardens, a small park adjacent the Palace of Westminster
- Queen Victoria Gardens, Melbourne, Australia
- Royal Victoria Gardens, North Woolwich, London
