= Aberavon Beach =

Beach in Port Talbot, Wales

Coordinates: 51°35′47″N 3°49′35″W

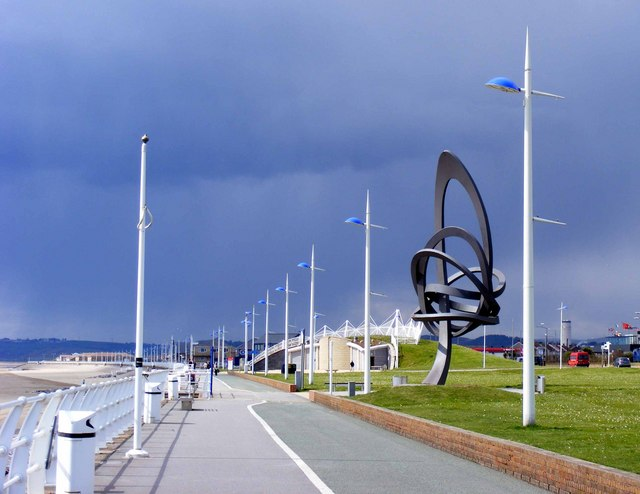
Aberavon Beach promenade and Kitetail sculpture

Aberavon Beach (Welsh: Traeth Aberafan), also known as Aberavon Sands, is a three-mile (5 km) stretch of sandy beach on the north-eastern edge of Swansea Bay in Port Talbot, Wales. With its high breaker waves, it is popular with surfers. Aberavon Beach was awarded Blue Flag status in December 2007 and features in the Good Beach Guide published by the Marine Conservation Society.

A traditional "bucket and spade" resort for the South Wales Valleys during the 1940s, '50s and '60s, Aberavon Beach was once an area of sand dunes known as Aberavon Burrows. Changing economic and social conditions led to the decline of the resort, but in 1998 the local authority published a strategy to improve the physical environment of the area and increase tourism. New facilities completed since then have included an amphitheatre, piazza and skateboard park, while a six-screen Reel Cinema opened next to the Afan Lido as part of a development called "Hollywood Park". However, associated plans for a bowling alley have failed to progress and restaurant franchises on the site have struggled, leading one businessman to claim that the seafront regeneration scheme has been a "white elephant". The beachfront also houses a hotel and a small number of cafes, bars and restaurants.

Concerns have been expressed about coastal erosion affecting Aberavon Beach and various other beaches in Swansea Bay.

== Gallery ==
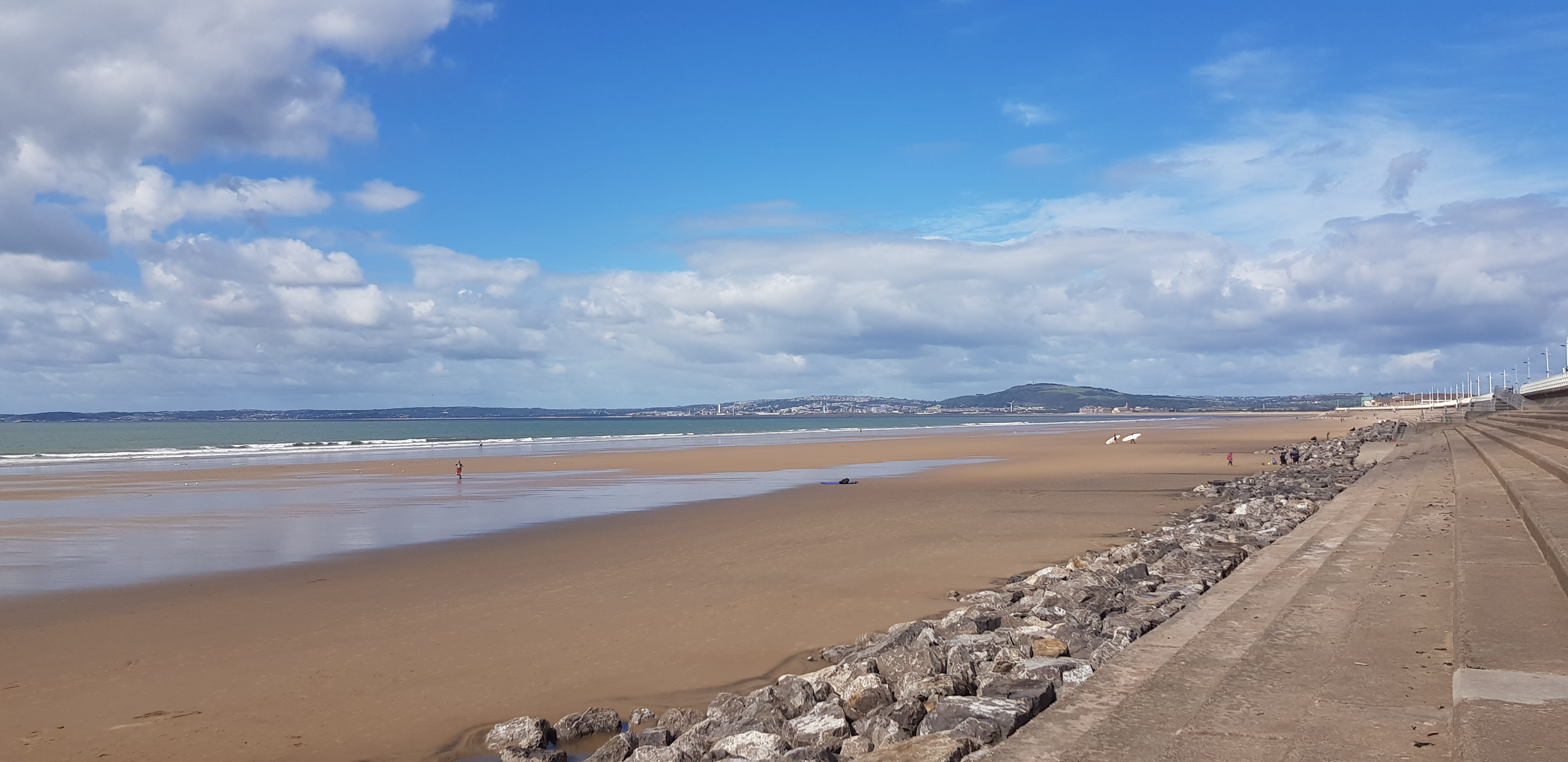
Aberavon Beach view to Swansea Bay

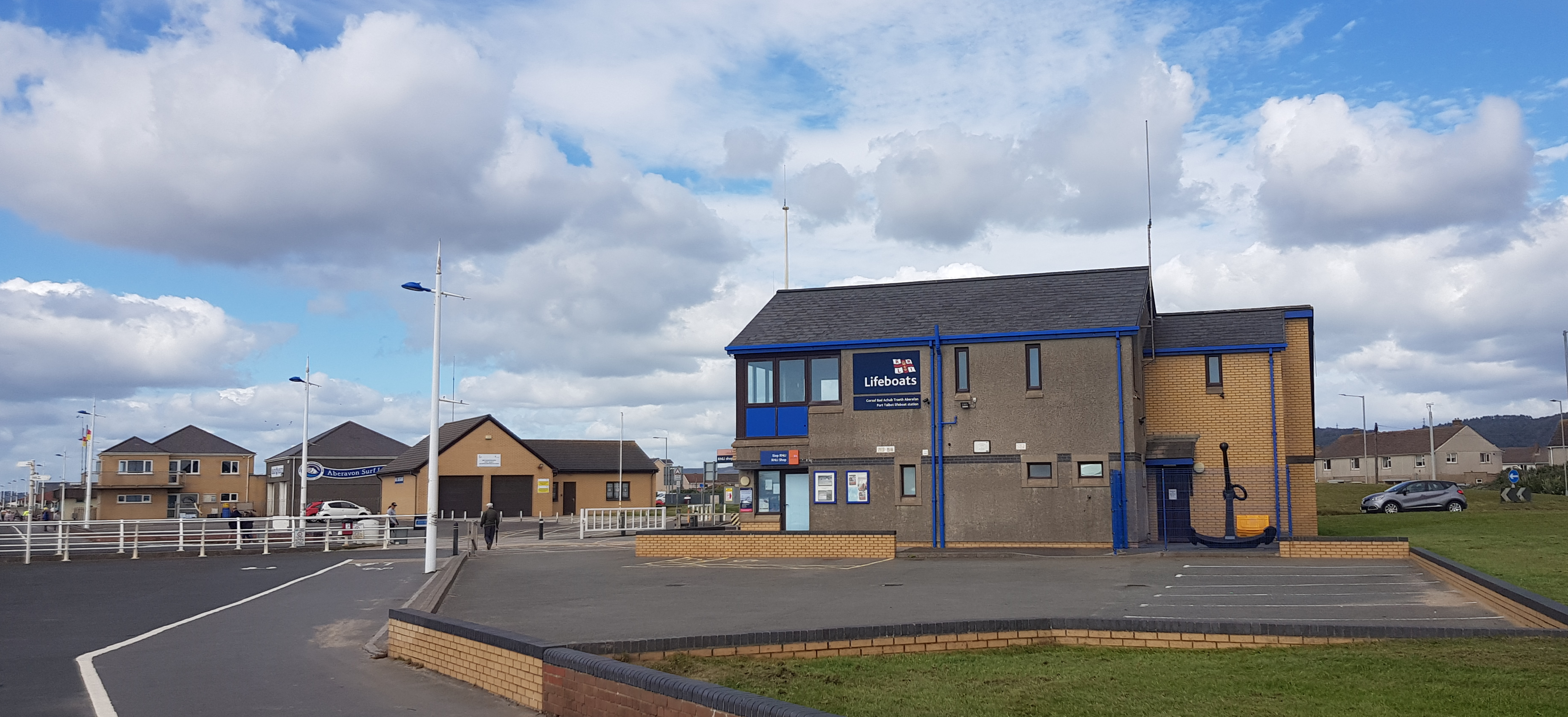
RNLI Port Talbot Lifeboat Station at Aberavon Beach

Video of seafront view Aberavon

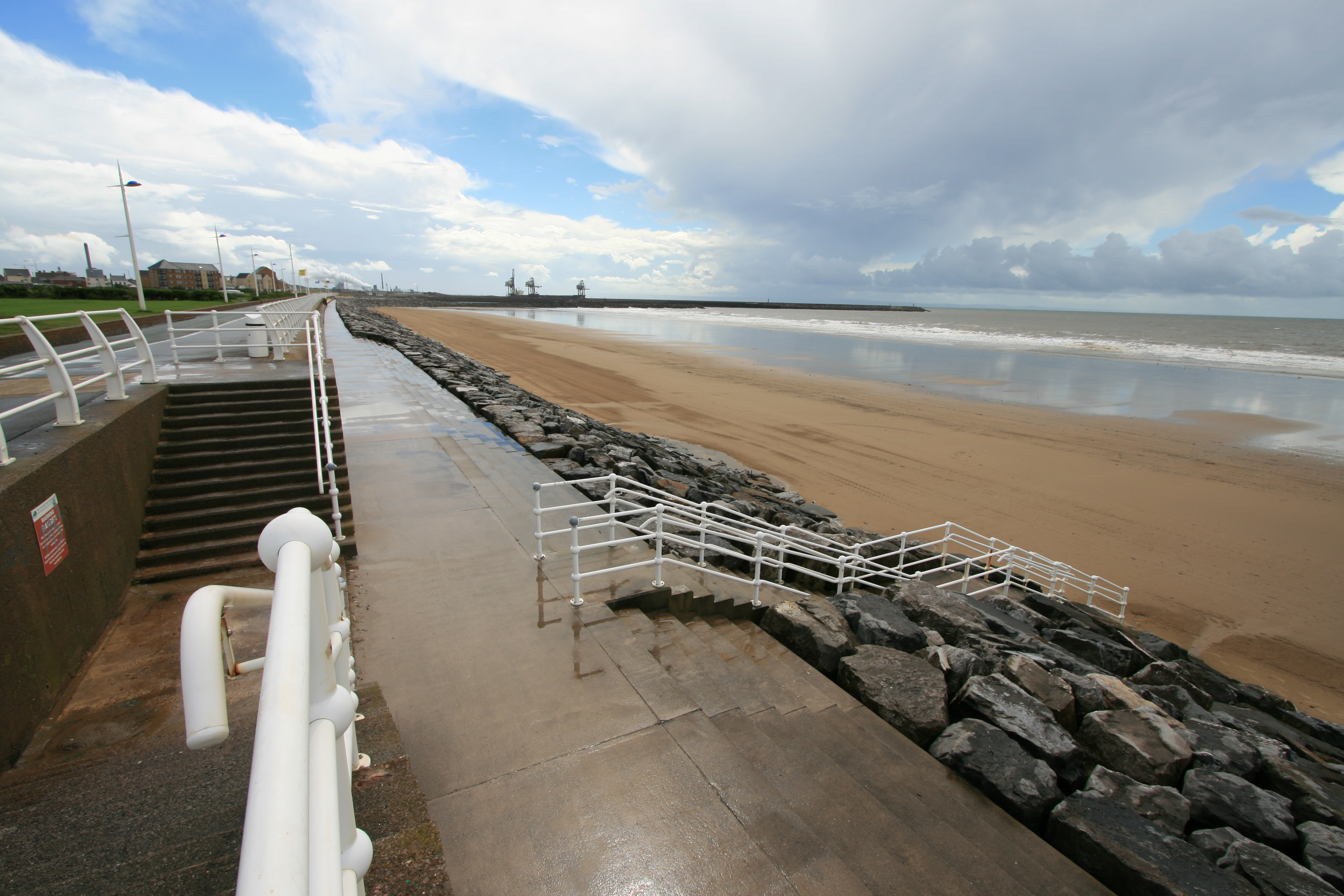
Aberavon Beach view seafront

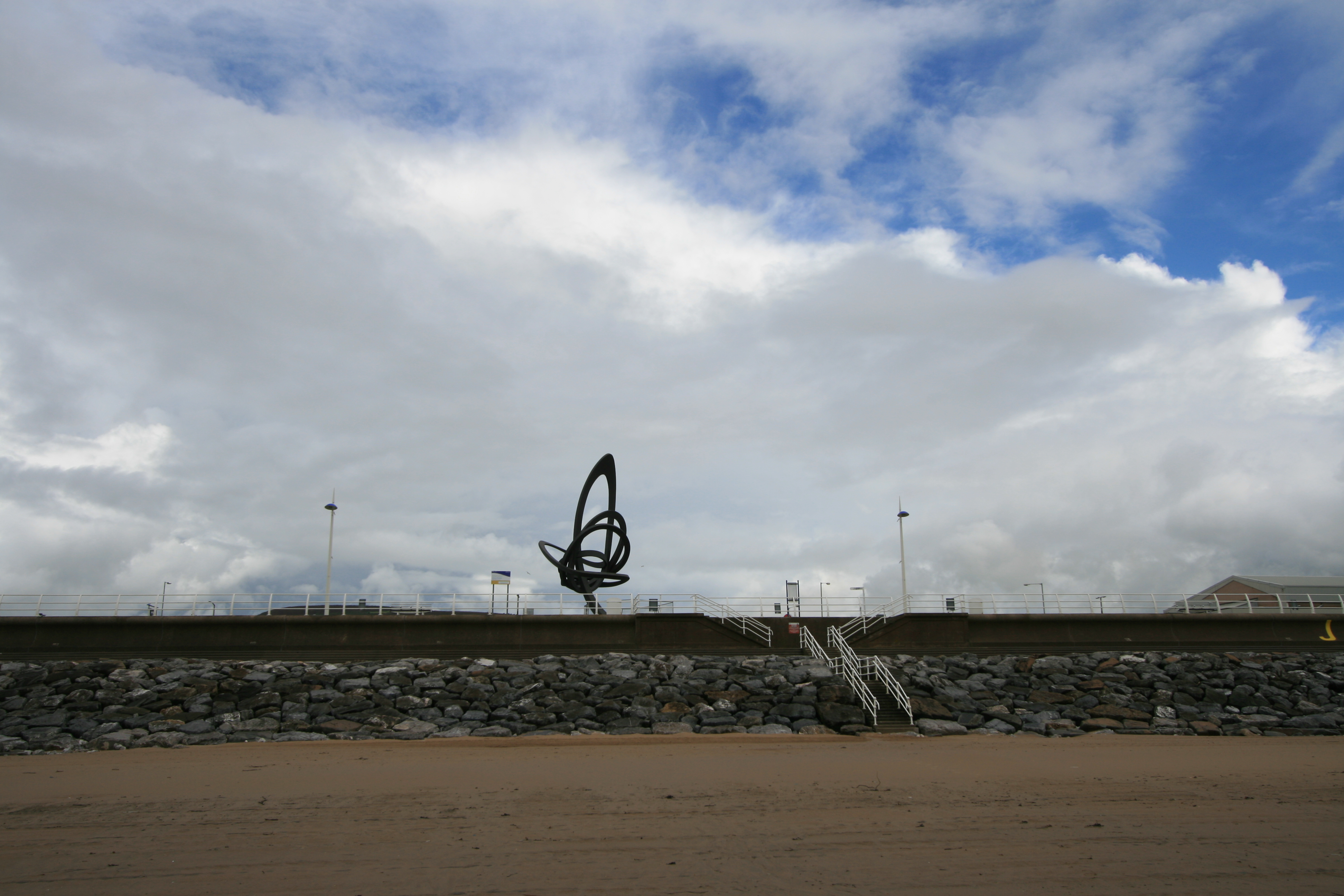
Aberavon Beach view seafront from beach, with Kitetrail sculpture in view

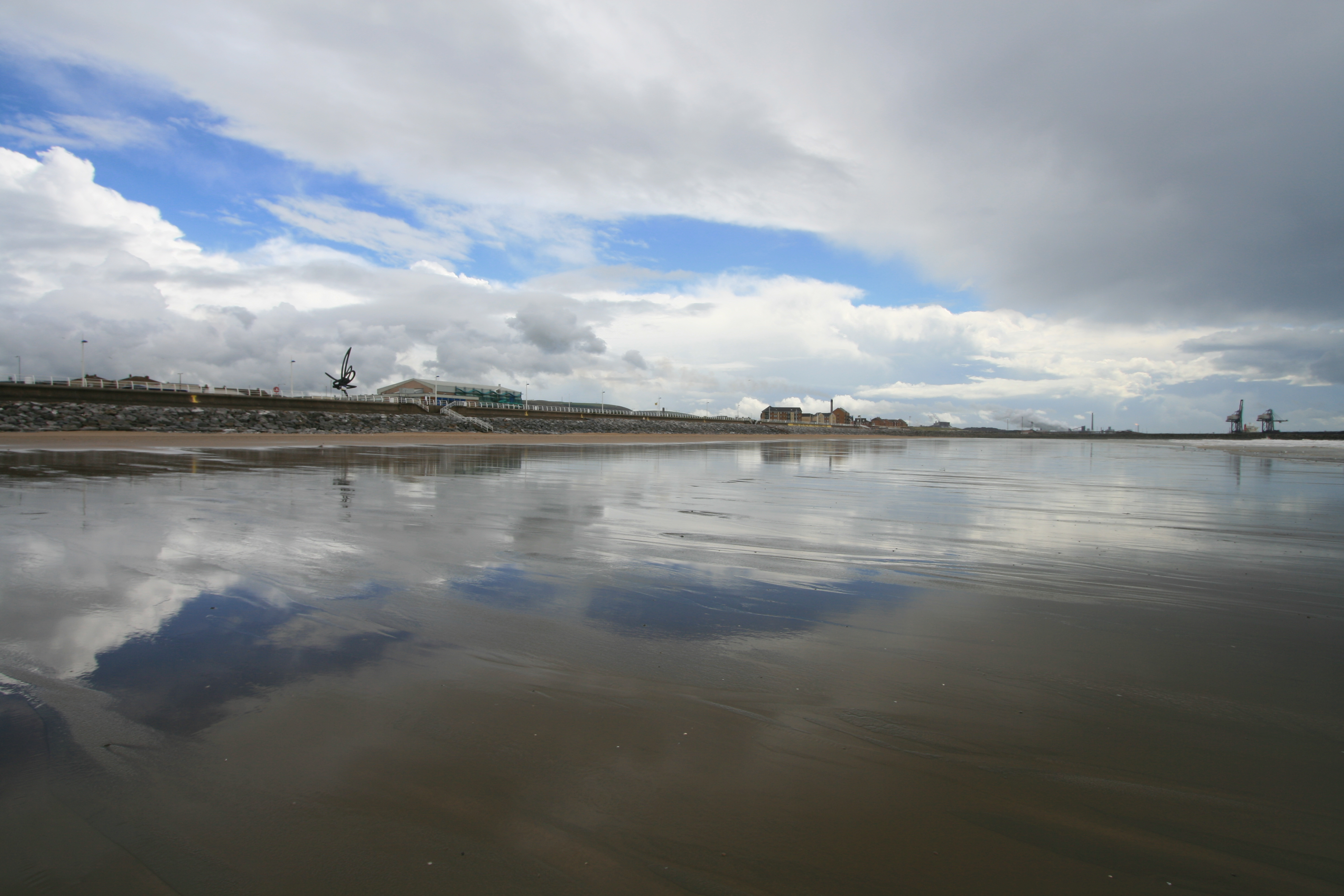
Aberavon Beach view towards seafront

== Afan Lido Fire and Regeneration ==
In December 2009, more than 100 firefighters tackled a fire at the Afan Lido after a blaze broke out at the pool. The fire at the lido broke through the roof and fire crews were unable to enter the building. Seventeen fire vehicles including three aerial appliances were at the scene and firefighters remained at the scene for some 32-hours after the fire broke out. At the time of the fire the lido was open but had just one person swimming. A lifeguard on duty spotted flames coming up from behind a fake rock feature and raised the alarm. There were no fatalities.

As fire crews arrived at the scene residents were told to remain indoors and to keep doors and windows closed due to potentially dangerous chemicals. Approximately an hour after the fire started residents in the nearby Channel View area had to be evacuated from their homes due to the chemicals inside the building. A restaurant which was located a few hundred metres from the Afan Lido complex also had to be evacuated.

As the fire was happening local council members promised that the Afan Lido would be replaced. Soon after the fire, the building was condemned and marked as structurally unsafe. Soon plans were being drawn up for a new Afan Lido with hopes for it to be completed by the summer 2013.

In October 2011, after almost two years demolition finally began, clearing the site had previously been hampered by the presence of asbestos. Work to remove it was completed and the building was fully demolished by January 2012.

After extensive public consultations through 2012 a replacement facility is due to begin construction in April 2014 – making use of the defunct bowling alley site. The site of the original complex will be sold to help offset the cost of the new build.

The replacement complex will contain :

- 8 lane, 25-metre (82 ft) swimming pool with boom and moveable floor
- Learner/splash pool
- 100 seat wet-side spectator gallery
- Wet & dry side changing facilities
- Café
- Indoor children's soft play area
- Community meeting rooms
- Youth club facility
- 100 station fitness suite
- Combined dance studio/dojo
- Spin room
- 4 court sports hall with seating for 100 spectators

The build is estimated to take around 15 months to complete with contractor Heron Brothers undertaking the work

== Kitetail sculpture ==
The Kitetail sculpture at Aberavon seafront is Wales' largest sculpture standing at 12 metres (40 ft) high and weighing 11 tonnes (1,700 st). Designed by Carmarthenshire-based artist and sculptor Andrew Rowe, it was installed in December 2007.

== Nearest places ==
- Baglan Bay
- Sandfields
- Aberavon
- Port Talbot docks
- Port Talbot Parkway railway station
