= Pontrhydyfen =

Coordinates: 51.634°N 3.744°W

Pontrhydyfen: Welsh: Pont-rhyd-y-fen
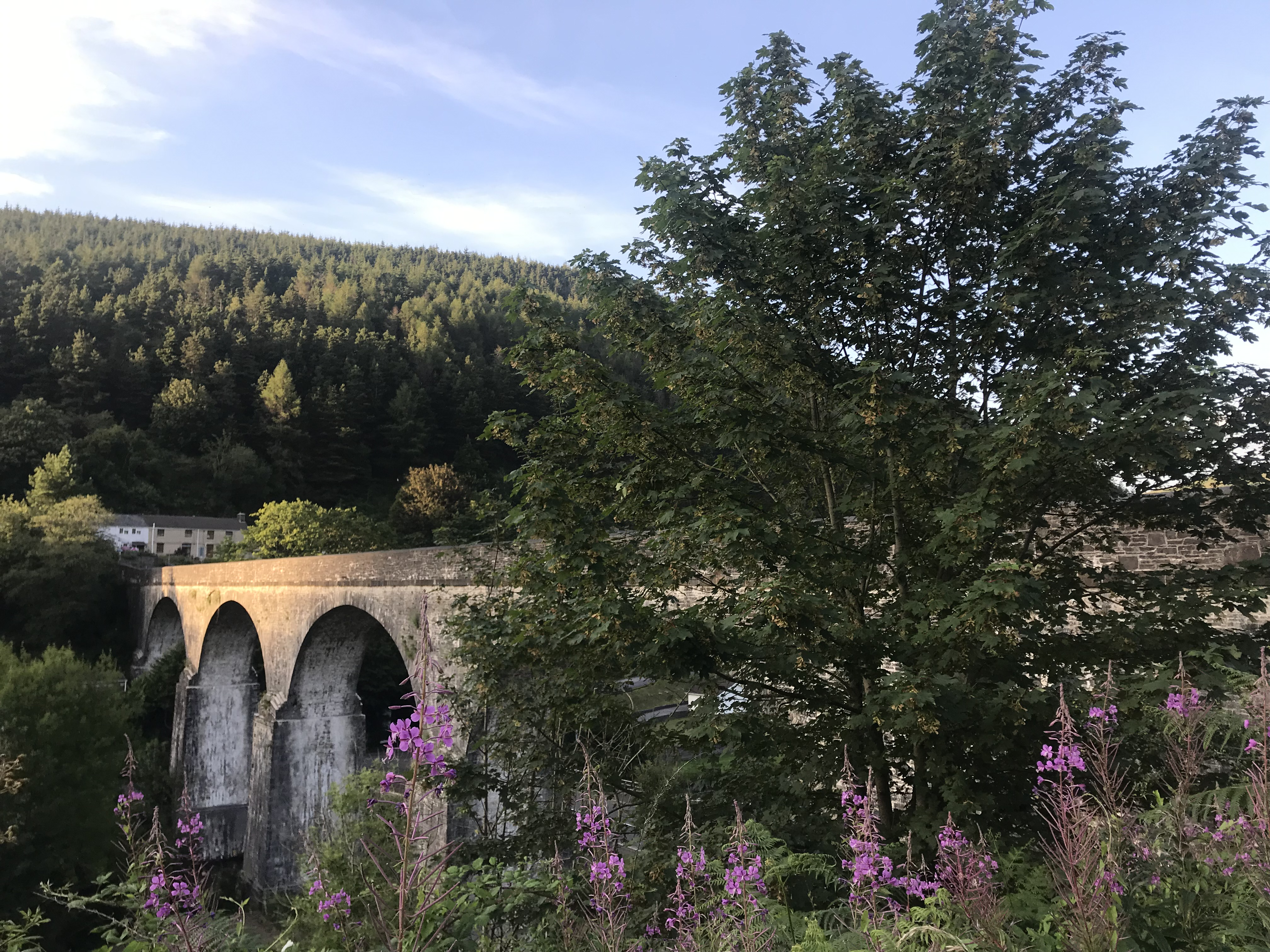
- Y Bont Fawr Aqueduct

- Location within Neath Port Talbot
- Population: 830
- OS grid reference: SS793942
- Principal area: Neath Port Talbot
- Preserved county: West Glamorgan
- Country: Wales
- Sovereign state: United Kingdom
- Post town: PORT TALBOT
- Postcode district: SA12
- Dialling code: 01639
- Police: South Wales
- Fire: Mid and West Wales
- Ambulance: Welsh
- UK Parliament: Aberafan Maesteg

Pontrhydyfen (or Pont-rhyd-y-fen) is a small village in the Afan Valley, in Neath Port Talbot county borough in Wales (grid reference SS794940). The village sits at the confluence of the River Afan and the smaller Afon Pelenna, 1.8 miles (2.9 km) north of the larger village of Cwmafan and not far from the towns of Port Talbot and Neath. The views from the village are dominated by the hills of Foel Fynyddau (370 m) to the west, Moel y Fen (260 m) to the south-east and Mynydd Pen-rhys (280 m) to the north. This former coal mining community is distinguished by two large 19th-century bridges that span the valley: a railway viaduct (the red bridge) and a former aqueduct, known in the Welsh language as Y Bont Fawr ("The Big Bridge"). The built-up area has a population of around 830. It is in the community of Pelenna. There is both a community centre and a rugby union club, Pontrhydyfen RFC.

== History ==
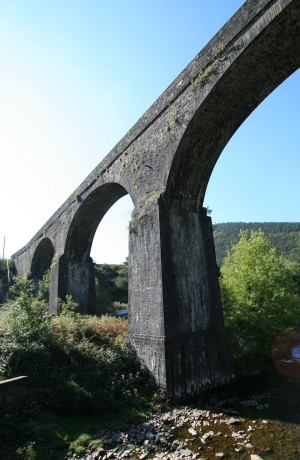
Pontrhydyfen Aqueduct

The industrial history of Oakwood began in the 1820s, when the first blast furnace was lighted for the Pontrhydyfen Iron Works and coalmaster John Reynolds built the aqueduct to power it. By 1877 local Ordnance Survey maps show the site of the iron works as ruins, but there are continued historical references to the two blast furnaces at Pontrhydyfen until 1902.

George Yates' Map of the County Glamorgan shows coal mining just south of Oakwood on the West slopes of Moel y Fen and Mynydd Bychan by 1799. By 1875 maps show a range of collieries including: Craig (SS 788933), Graiglyn (SS 788935) & Wernavon (SS 791936) on the south-east slopes of Foel Fynddau, each serviced by tramways, and Craig-y-fedw (SS 787947) on the east slope of Mynydd Hawdref and then by 1914 maps show Oakwood Colliery (SS 799941) just to the south-east of Rhyslyn Carpark.

There are several viaducts around the village. The nine-arch Pontrhydyfen viaduct built in 1898 was the last railway bridge built in the valley. The Bont Fawr Aqueduct (aka The Big Bridge). Built by John Reynolds and completed in 1827, the four-arch aqueduct is 153 yards (140 m) long and over 75 feet (23 m) high. A watercourse some two miles long carried water from the Afan; it supplied the water which powered the giant waterwheels of the Oakwood / Pontrhydyfen Ironworks. Its use in supplying the waterwheels was relatively short-lived, and there is no record it being used for this purpose following the acquisition of the site by Governor and Company of Copper Miners in 1841. The Bont Fawr Aqueduct is 'one of the few surviving structures relating to the use of water power in the iron industry in the region' and is a Grade II* listed building. It remains in use today as a bridge for pedestrians and cyclists, the canal which it once carried having been filled in.

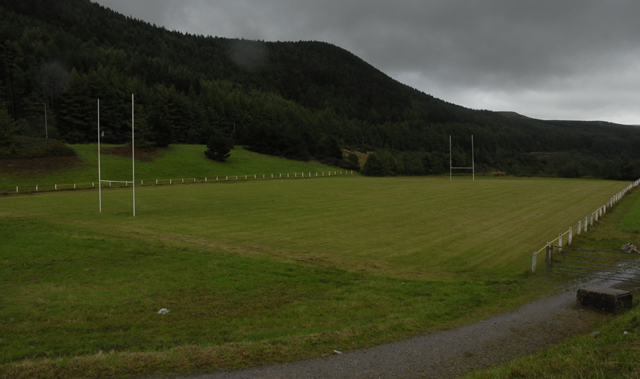
The Pontrhydyfen Rugby Ground

By 1897 there were three quarries on Moel y Fen, one on Mynydd Hawdref (just west of Efail-fach), two on the east slopes of Foel Fynyddau, two on the south slopes of Mynydd Pen-Rhys and one in the vicinity of Penhydd-fach.

== Notable people ==
Pontrhydyfen was the birthplace of the actor, Richard Burton, Broadway theatre and musical star Ivor Emmanuel who was also in Zulu, international opera singer Rebecca Evans, and singer and songwriter Geraint Griffiths. The Richard Burton Appreciation Society is based in the village.

== Visitor destination ==
Due to its location close to Afan Forest Park, the area is a gateway for mountain biking. The valley offers the best places for mountain biking in South Wales and is consistently ranked highly within the best in the UK. There are paths for walking from the village that lead to the Penrhys Trail.

There are also three pubs in the area, The Colliers, The Miners and the Blue Scar.
