= River Afan =

Coordinates: 51.63294°N 3.73398°W

River Afan Welsh: Afon Afan
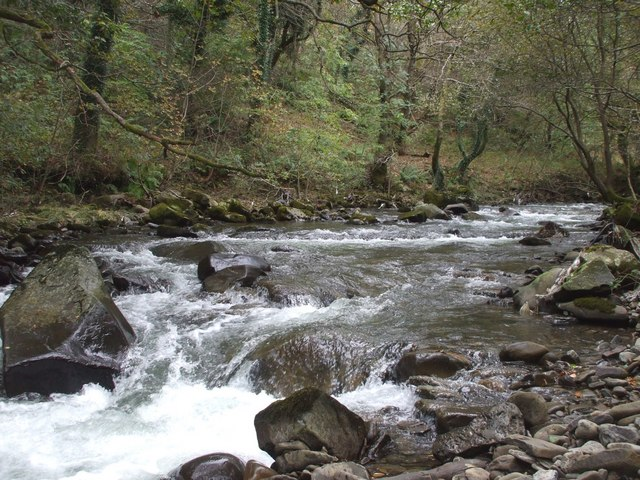
- The Afan near Cymmer

Location
- Country: Wales
- Towns: Blaengwynfi, Cymmer, Cwmafan, Port Talbot,

Physical characteristics
- Source
  - location: Mynydd Llangeinwyr

Basin features
- Tributaries
  - right: Afon Corrwg, Afon Pelenna

The River Afan (Welsh: Afon Afan) is a river in Wales whose valley formed the territory of the medieval Lords of Afan. The Afan Valley encompasses the upper reaches of the river. The valley is traversed by the A4107 road. Settlements in the area include Cwmafan, Pontrhydyfen and Cymmer. The town of Aberavon, whose name in Welsh Aberafan means 'mouth of the Afan', grew up on the banks of the river and was later subsumed by the town of Port Talbot.

== Etymology ==
Multiple hypotheses exist regarding the origin of the river's name. One suggestion is that it is from "A-Ban" meaning "from the heights" due to its comparatively quick descent from hills to the sea. (Compare to the 'Ban' in "Bannau Brycheiniog", the Brecon Beacons). However, such a name would be very unusual for a river. It is not parallelled elsewhere, and does not fit in with the pattern of Welsh stream and river nomenclature in general. A. D. Mills believes the river derives ultimately from a personal name.

== Course ==
The Afan rises on the northern slopes of Mynydd Llangeinwyr to the east of Blaengwynfi, and flows in a generally south-westerly direction roughly parallel to the River Neath with which it shares its western watershed.

The river passes the Afan Argoed Country Park in its middle reaches. It converges with the river Pelenna at Pontrhydyfen. From here it turns southward towards Port Talbot.

To aid the construction of the docks at Port Talbot, the river was impounded and a diversion channel built that now forms the lower reaches of this river. There are two weirs in this final tidal reach of the Afan; Greenpark Weir at the upstream tidal limit, which has been reconstructed in 2017 and provides headwaters for the dock feeder channel that approximately follows the river's original route, and Newbridge Weir, which is the most downstream weir, presents a barrier to fish passage and is in a poor state of repair.

A motte and bailey castle stood on the banks of the river as it passed through Aberavon during the medieval period. No remains are now visible above ground, but the site of the castle is commemorated in local street names.

== Geography ==
To the east the Afan borders the River Kenfig and then the River Llynfi, a tributary of the River Ogmore. The Afan shares a watershed with the Rhondda Fawr, a tributary of the River Taff.

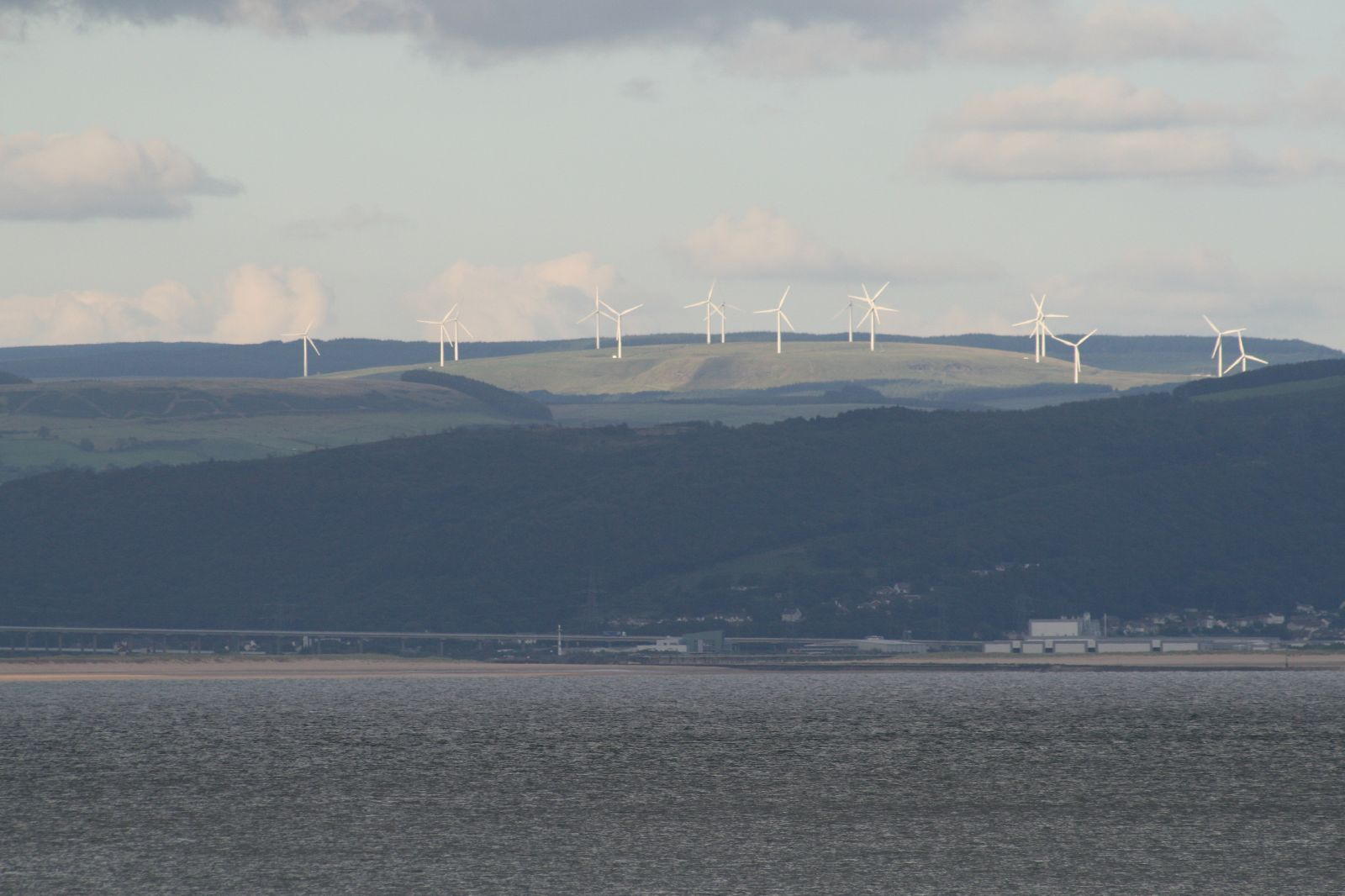
Wind farm on the hills above Afan Valley

== Industrial past ==
For much of the 19th century and the first half of the 20th century, the River Afan was severely polluted by the coal and iron industries. With the decline in the coal mining industry, the quality of the river improved in the 1960s and 1970s so that some salmon and sea trout started to return to the river to spawn. A number of weirs on the river had to be made passable to allow fish to ascend the river. This required the creation of fish passes on some weirs such as on the Dock feeder weir and the demolition of others such as at Corlannau weir.

== Tributaries ==
=== River Corrwg ===
The Corrwg is one of the Afan's principal tributaries. Its length is approximately 11 km, and its source lies above the village of Glyncorrwg, in the hills south of Glyn-neath. It has a major tributary, Afon Corrwg Fechan, as well as numerous tributary streams. Several waterfalls exist along the river's course. Although the water is clear today, discharge from the many collieries along its lower reaches led to significant pollution. Minor discharge sometimes leaks from the Glyncorrwg colliery, although its effects do not have a noticeably detrimental effect on the river.

=== River Pelenna ===
The Pelenna, a major tributary that meets the Afan at Pontrhydyfen, suffered more severely from pollution than the main river because of the sulphur-rich coal that was produced by the mines in that area. As a result, the abandoned coal mines continued to discharge acid mine drainage rich in iron and highly acidic. This turned much of the river orange down to the confluence of the Pelena with the main river Afan. The orange colour could often be seen as far down stream as Pontrhydyfen. There were a number of collieries contributing to the pollution although the major source was the Whitworth Colliery. At the height of coal extraction in the valley, there were several deep pits and numerous levels. This pollution is now much mitigated following extensive work promoted by the Environment Agency in the creation of engineered reed beds to treat the mine drainage.

=== Nant Ffrwdwyllt ===
Nant Ffrwdwyllt was a small tributary of the Afan, just under 8 km and joining the Afan close to the sea. It was diverted in the 18th century into the ironworks at what was to become Port Talbot, to provide a source of water. It remains diverted, flowing into Port Talbot Docks.
