= Mynydd Llangeinwyr =

Hill in Bridgend County Borough, Wales

Highest point
- Elevation: 568 m (1,864 ft)
- Prominence: 88 m (289 ft)
- Isolation: 4.9 miles (7.9 km)
- Listing: sub-HuMP, County top
- Coordinates: 51.6412°N 3.5726°W

Naming
- English translation: Llangeinor hill
- Language of name: Welsh

Geography
- Location: Bridgend, Wales
- OS grid: SS 912947
- Topo map: OS Landranger 170 / Explorer 166

Mynydd Llangeinwyr is the highest hill in the county borough of Bridgend in the coalfield of South Wales. It forms a long north–south ridge between the valleys of Cwm Garw to the west and Cwm Ogwr Fawr to the east. The highest point of the ridge is the 568-metre flat dome known as Werfa which is crowned by a trig point and prominent masts. A secondary trig point is sited at a height of 530 m near to the ancient cairn of Carn-yr-hyrddod. The hill is named from the village of Llangeinor below its southern tip.

== Geology ==
The hill is formed from Pennant Sandstone overlying a thick suite of South Wales Coal Measures rocks which have been heavily mined in the past. Many NW-SE aligned faults cut through the area. Numerous small landslips affect the steeper slopes of the hill.

== Access ==
Almost all of the upper slopes of the hill are mapped as open country under the Countryside and Rights of Way Act 2000 and thereby open to largely unfettered public access on foot. In addition numerous public footpaths give access onto the hill from the communities in the surrounding valleys and a public bridleway runs southwest from the A4107 road across the summit plateau then steeply down to Blaengarw.

== Geodesy ==
Werfa, under the name of Llangeinor, was the origin (meridian) for the 6 inch and 1:2500 Ordnance Survey maps of all the old Welsh counties except Pembroke, Denbigh and Flint: Anglesey, Carnarvon, Merioneth, Montgomery, Cardigan, Radnor, Carmarthen, Brecknock, Glamorgan and Monmouth. It also was the origin for Shropshire and Hereford.
