= Montagne Jeunesse =

- Company type: Private limited company
- Industry: Cosmetics
- Founded: 1985
- Founder: Gregory Butcher
- Headquarters: Baglan Energy Park, Wales, United Kingdom
- Products: Cosmetic supplies
- Website: http://www.montagnejeunesse.com

Montagne Jeunesse, renamed "7th Heaven", is a beauty-product business based in Baglan Energy Park, South Wales, UK. The firm was established in 1985 by Gregory Butcher. The company manufactures toiletry that are approved by the Vegetarian Society and the British Union for the Abolition of Vivisection (BUAV).

The company has had a Welsh presence since 1988, and has been located on the Baglan Energy Park site since November 2005, marketing and distributing cosmetic products such as face masks.
