= Rebecca Evans (soprano) =

Welsh operatic soprano

Rebecca Evans CBE
- Evans in 2006
- Born: 1963 (age 62–63); Pontrhydyfen, West Glamorgan, Wales
- Education: Guildhall School of Music and Drama
- Occupation: Opera singer (soprano)
- Evans singing Alle Voci del Bronzo Guerriero by George Frideric Handel Recorded 1995

Rebecca Ann Evans CBE is a Welsh operatic soprano.

== Life and career ==
Evans was born in Pontrhydyfen. She studied at the Guildhall School of Music and Drama.

Evans has performed as Susanna (The Marriage of Figaro) for the Santa Fe Opera; Adele (Die Fledermaus) for the Chicago Lyric Opera; Zerlina (Don Giovanni), Ann Trulove (The Rake's Progress) and Adina (L'elisir d'amore) for San Francisco Opera; and both Susanna and Zerlina for the Metropolitan Opera, New York.

She has appeared at the BBC Proms and the Edinburgh Festival; at a Gala Concert to celebrate the opening of the Welsh Assembly in the presence of Queen Elizabeth II and the Prince of Wales; and in Bremen with Andrea Bocelli and the London Philharmonic Orchestra.

Her recordings include Ilia (Idomeneo), Pamina (The Magic Flute) and Susanna (The Marriage of Figaro) for Chandos; Nanetta (Falstaff) for Decca, and a solo recording of Italian songs for EMI. She has also recorded three soprano parts in a series of Gilbert & Sullivan operettas: the Plaintiff in Trial by Jury, Mabel in The Pirates of Penzance and Josephine in H.M.S. Pinafore. She participated in the second recording of Delius's Requiem (1996, under Richard Hickox). She has also sung Belinda in the BBC film of Dido and Aeneas and hosted the BBC television series A Touch of Classics with the BBC National Orchestra of Wales. She was also a guest artist on the 2008 BBC2 series Maestro presented by Clive Anderson.

Evans married Stephen Jones in 1997, and they have one son, William. They live in Penarth, South Wales.

== Honours and awards ==
Evans is an Honorary Fellow of the Royal Welsh College of Music and Drama and was awarded an honorary degree, Doctor of Music, from the University of Glamorgan in 1997. She is also vice-president of Wales and Patron of Music in Hospitals Cymru/Wales.

On 1 May 2009, Evans was awarded an honorary degree Doctor of Music from the University of Wales.

Evans was appointed by the Eisteddfod as a member of the Gorsedd of Bards. Created in 1792 as celebration of Welsh heritage, the Gorsedd are those who have contributed significantly to Welsh culture.

Morriston Orpheus Choir Supporters' Association (MOCSA) Young Welsh Singer of the Year 1989

Evans was appointed Commander of the Order of the British Empire (CBE) in the 2020 Birthday Honours for services to the arts in Wales.

== Opera recordings ==
Title	Year	Label
The Pearl Fishers	2008	Chandos
The Pilgrim's Progress	2008	Chandos
Hugh the Drover	1994	Hyperion
La bohème	2005	Chandos
The Magic Flute	2006	Chandos
Sofonisba	2007	Chandos
The Marriage of Figaro	2007	Chandos
Fidelio	2008	Chandos
Falstaff	2006	Chandos
Idomeneo	2006	Chandos
Hansel and Gretel	2007	Chandos
