= SPECIFIC =

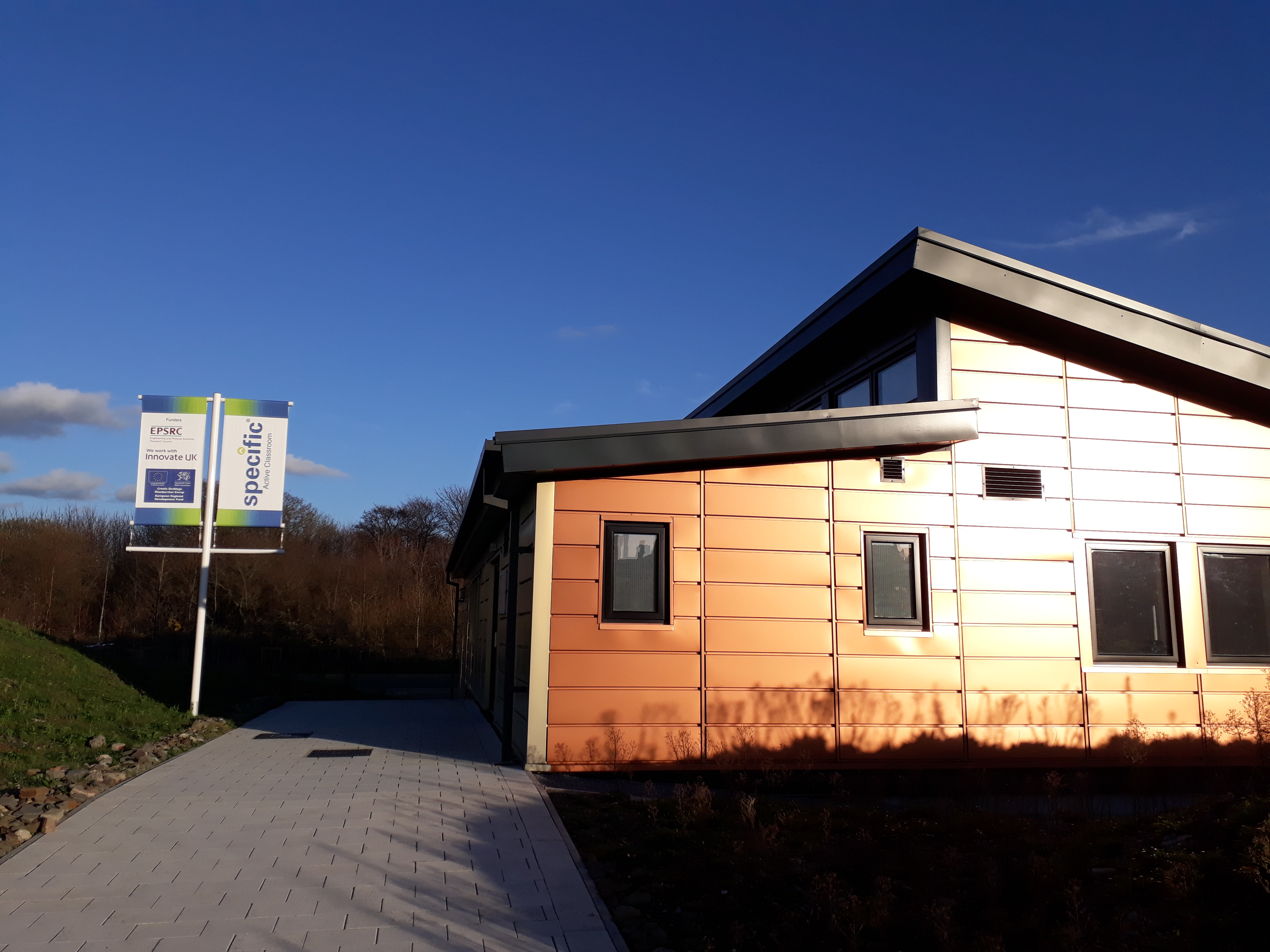
SPECIFIC active classroom Swansea University

The Sustainable Product Engineering Centre for Innovative Functional Industrial Coatings (SPECIFIC) is an academic and industrial consortium led by Swansea University, with Tata Steel as the main industrial partner. It is funded by EPSRC, Innovate UK and the Welsh Government.

The centre is developing the concept 'Buildings as Power Stations' and has been awarded £26 million, comprising £15 million from the EU, with the remaining money coming from EPSRC, Innovate UK, industry partners, and contributions from Swansea and Cardiff universities.

SPECIFIC has developed an 'Active Classroom', designed by architect Joanna Clarke and situated at Swansea University Bay Campus, showcasing innovative technologies for creating low carbon buildings which generate more energy than they consume. The Active Classroom won the Construction Excellence in Wales Award for Innovation in 2017.

In 2018 the UK government announced £36 million funding for an Active Building Centre in order to accelerate market adoption of active buildings.
