= Bucket and spade =

Beach toys

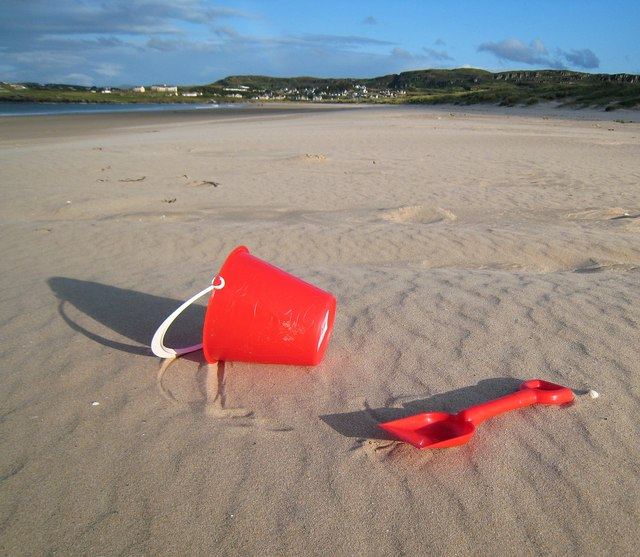
Red bucket and spade

Bucket and spade sets are traditional British seaside paraphernalia that can be bought cheaply from any beachside vendor. They usually consist of a small plastic bucket with a handle and a small shovel, sometimes decorated with a variety of bright colours and patterns. In North America, they are called shovels with pails.

These are sometimes, but not always, accompanied by a variety of moulds, with which one can make sand sculptures. Most traditionally, these are associated with sandcastles, although they are also often used to gather objects such as seashells and pebbles.

A larger spade and bucket are useful when foraging for organisms that dwell in sand or mud, such as razor clams, lugworms and spoon worms.
