= Sandfields, Port Talbot =

District of Port Talbot, Wales

Coordinates: 51°35′37.00″N 3°48′11.00″W

Sandfields (Welsh: Traethmelyn) is a mainly residential district of Port Talbot, Wales. The area is located in South Wales on a narrow coastal plain between Mynydd Dinas and the sea. The M4 motorway, A48 trunk road and South Wales Main Line run nearby. The area includes a council estate, industrial areas and a seaside resort at Aberavon Beach.

== Background ==
The Sandfields estate, consisting mainly of semi-detached houses, was built between 1947 and 1955 to initially house workers for Port Talbot steelworks. In 2017, 1,800 of the 3,000 homes were owned by a social housing provider.

== Government ==
The area encompasses the electoral wards of Sandfields West and Sandfields East, part of the Neath Port Talbot unitary authority.

Prior to 1974 Sandfields was a ward to Glamorgan County Council, represented by a Labour Party councillor.

== Social conditions ==
The two electoral wards covering Sandfields were ranked in top 50 most deprived wards in Wales in the 2000 Welsh Index of Multiple Deprivation. In the 2005 index, Sandfields West was one of the 10% most deprived wards in Wales. It is the most densely populated ward in Neath Port Talbot.

== Afan Lido ==
The Afan Lido leisure centre was opened by the Queen in 1965. The facility formerly included a 50m competition swimming pool, which was later converted into a 25m leisure pool called the "Aquadome" with water slides when the complex was re-fitted during the mid-1990s. The Lido also has a spa, gym, and concert hall where famous bands have played, including in recent years McFly, All Saints, Stereophonics, Manic Street Preachers and Lostprophets.

The Lido was the site of a major fire on 16 December 2009 which broke out in the Aquadome part of the complex. Residents in surrounding streets were evacuated due to fears of the safety of chemicals in the fire that broke through the centre's roof. The centre has since been closed and demolished.

== Education ==
Sandfields Comprehensive School was the first purpose-built comprehensive school in Wales when it opened in 1958. In 2000, it was recognised by the Welsh Secondary Schools Association (WSSA) as the most improved school in Wales. The school has produced a number of sportsmen and women who have represented Wales at international level, including rugby players Allan Martin and Les Keen (ex-Aberavon RFC); footballers Brian Flynn and Laura May Walkely of Arsenal Ladies Football Team. The school closed in 2016 due to it being replaced by Ysgol Bae Baglan and was demolished in 2017.

Ysgol Bae Baglan an all-through school in Neath Port Talbot and opened in 2016 following the closure of Sandfields Comprehensive school, Glan Afan Comprehensive School and Cwrt Sart Comprehensive School in 2016.

Several primary schools are located within the Sandfields Estate including Tywyn and Awel Y Mor.

=== Community Archives Wales ===
The Port Talbot Historical Society and Community Archives Wales meet at Sandfields' Library.

== Nearest Places ==
- Baglan Bay
- Baglan
- Aberavon
- Aberavon Beach
