= Victoria Gardens, Neath =

Grade II registered park In Wales

Coordinates: 51.6615°N 3.8024°W

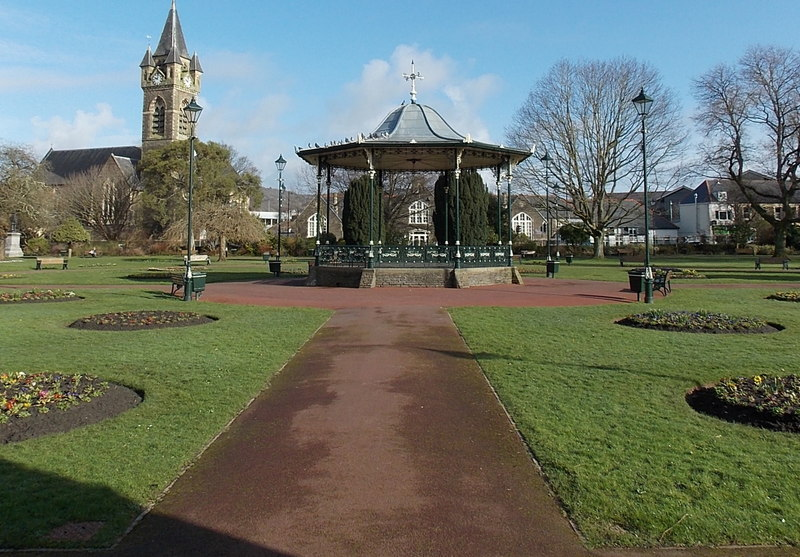
The bandstand in Victoria Gardens.

The Victoria Gardens, in the town centre of Neath, Wales, is a Grade II registered park on the Cadw/ICOMOS Register of Parks and Gardens of Special Historic Interest in Wales.

Neath Borough Council purchased two hectares of land in the centre of Neath in 1856 to provide an open space for the people of Neath. Called the Corporation Fields, various events were held there, including cricket and rugby matches and the annual Great September Fair until 1897, when it became a formal park to commemorate Queen Victoria's Diamond Jubilee. The gardens were designed by a local man, Thomas Snow, and were officially opened on 22 June 1897, the date of Queen Victoria's Diamond Jubilee, by the then mayor of Neath, Arthur Russell Thomas, and officially re-opened as Victoria Gardens on 30 June 1898 by the mayor Abraham George.

It has been described as "a quintessential Victorian urban public park", and has most of its original layout and features intact, including a Grade II listed bandstand and inclined flowers beds displaying carpet bedding designs. Other features include a bronze statue of Howel Gwyn, Gorsedd stones, a drinking fountain, and a Spanish Civil War memorial.

During his teens, notable former Neath resident Harry Parr-Davies regularly visited the gardens to compose music.
