= Baglan Bay =

Coordinates: 51°36′30″N 3°50′30″W

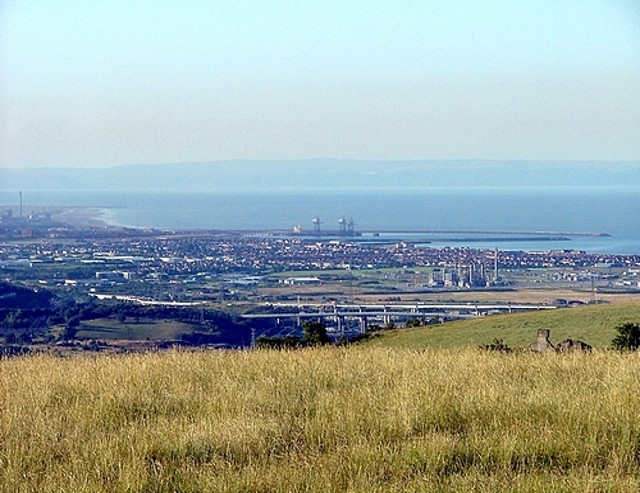
- Baglan Bay from Mynydd Drumau

- Location within Neath Port Talbot
- Community: Baglan Bay
- Principal area: Neath Port Talbot
- Country: Wales
- Sovereign state: United Kingdom
- List of places UK Wales Neath Port Talbot Map of the community

Baglan Bay (Welsh: Bae Baglan) is a part of the Swansea Bay coastline and a district of Neath Port Talbot county borough, Wales. Baglan Bay is also the name of a local government community. Baglan Bay is served by the M4 Motorway and the A48 road which traverse the northeastern edge of the area.

== History ==
In the 19th century, coal, tinplate and pottery were exported from Baglan Pill. In 1963 BP (trading as British Hydrocarbon Chemicals, Ltd.) opened petrochemical plants at Baglan Bay, partly to benefit from the proximity of the BP oil refinery at Llandarcy, which could supply feedstocks.

The plants produced 125,000 tons of petrochemicals during the first year of operation. The main products were ethylene (50-60,000 tons a year), ethylene dichloride (64,000 tons), propylene, butadiene (5000 tons), and isobutylene. Several other companies built chemical plants at Baglan Bay. Forth Chemicals (a joint subsidiary of Monsanto and BHC), had a styrene monomer plant within the BHC site. The petrochemicals complex produced alcohols, styrene, olefins, and benzene from the mid-1960s, and vinyl chloride monomer and polyvinyl chloride (PVC) from the early 1970s. By 1968, BP Baglan Bay was one of the largest petrochemical sites in Europe, employing 2500 workers at its peak in 1974. Other companies with plants at Baglan Bay included W. R. Grace (polybutenes) and Pfizer.

However, market changes led to the gradual closure of the facility between 1994 and 2004. There were concerns about the incidence of cancer and mortality near the Baglan Bay petrochemical works.

== Baglan Energy Park ==
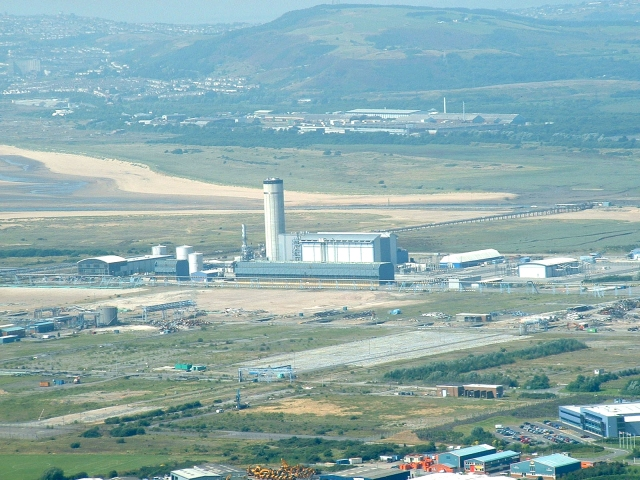
Baglan Bay power station

Following the final closure of BP's Baglan Bay plant in 2004, the site was re-developed by BP, the Welsh Development Agency (WDA) and Neath Port Talbot County Borough Council. Baglan Bay power station, a 500 MW combined cycle gas turbine power plant operated by GE Power Systems was built and the remainder of the land was earmarked for a 180-acre (0.73 km^{2}) business park, the Baglan Energy Park. Businesses locating at the park benefit from low cost electrical energy from the power station. Several plots are now developed with tenants or with speculative office and industrial premises available to let. A paper mill, Intertissue, part of the Italian paper tissue manufacturing company Sofidel Group, was completed in September 2006. The Energy Park is also home to the Baglan Bay Innovation Center, the Sustainable Product Engineering Centre for Innovative Functional Industrial Coatings (SPECIFIC) project, Hi-Lex Cable System Ltd, Remploy Ltd, Montagne Jeunesse, headquarters for Abertawe Bro Morgannwg University Health Board, and headquarters for Neath Port Talbot County Borough Council's service response centre.

New facilities are under construction for Shield Medicare Ltd (a subsidiary of US sanitation supply company Ecolab) and the University of Glamorgan's Hydrogen research and demonstration centre. Developer TCN UK is planning to develop a 57,000 sq ft (5,300 m^{2}). development called The Exchange which is expected to provide office space for 400 workers.

== Plans ==
A wholly owned BP company, Abernedd Power Ltd, proposed a further two natural gas-fired power stations with a total generation capacity of 870 MW of electricity. The scheme reached the planning stage. Construction was due to start in 2010 to meet a projected shortfall in power generation capacity in the UK and Wales within the next 4 to 6 years. However, a revised plan for a smaller power station of 450 MW was approved. SSE now own the project and have submitted a variation to the plans to enable them to build an open cycle gas turbine power station. St. Modwen Properties acquired 1,050 acres (4.2 km^{2}) of BP-owned land in April 2009 with a view to developing the land for employment-led purposes. Scottish and Southern Energy completed the acquisition of the Abernedd Power Company in May 2009.

== Nearest places ==
- Jersey Marine Beach
- Baglan Bay power station
- Crymlyn Burrows
- Briton Ferry
- Baglan
- Sandfields
