= Port Talbot =

Town and community in Wales

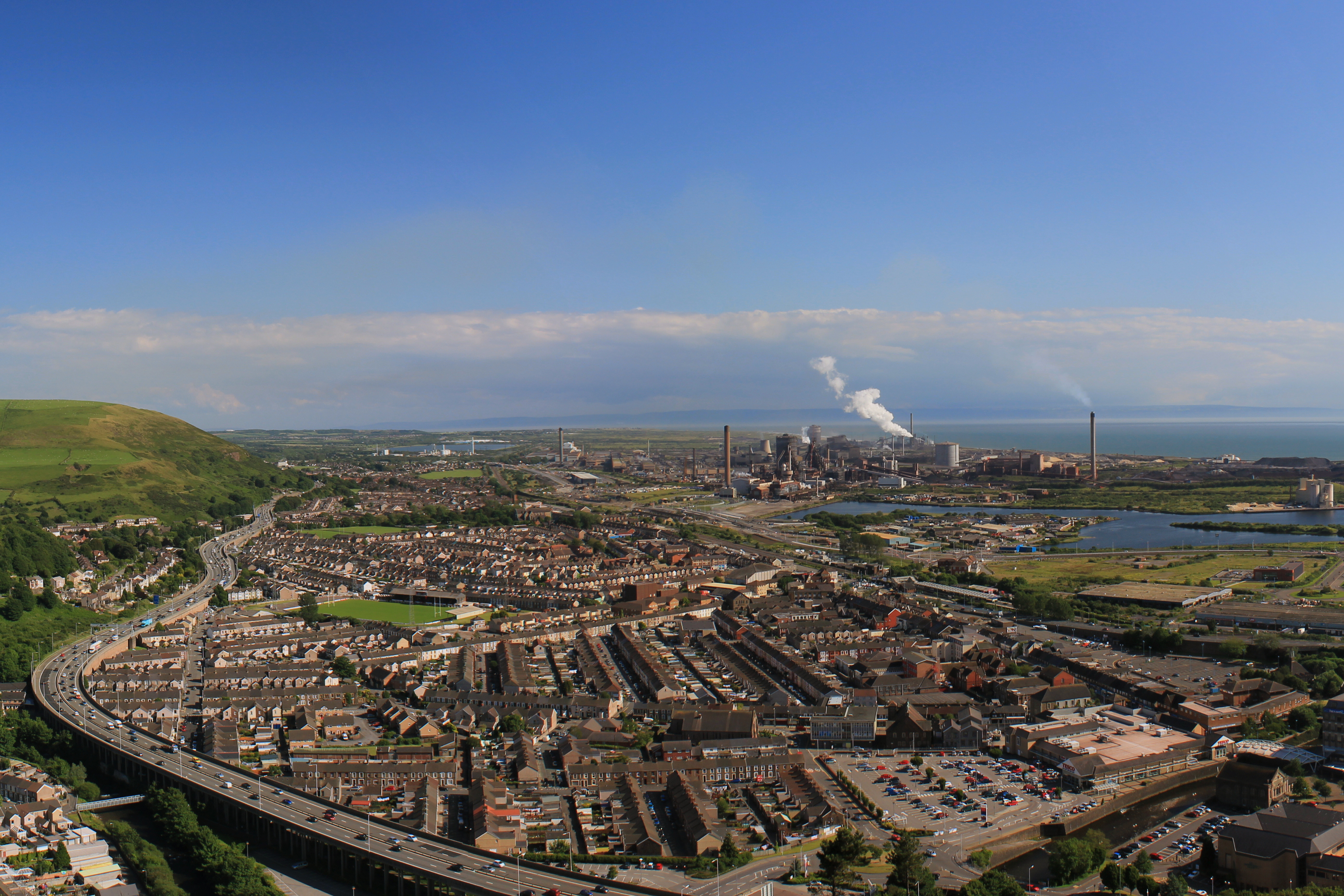
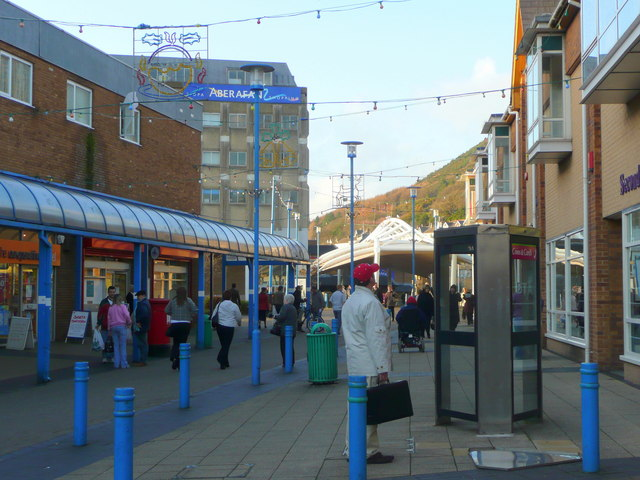
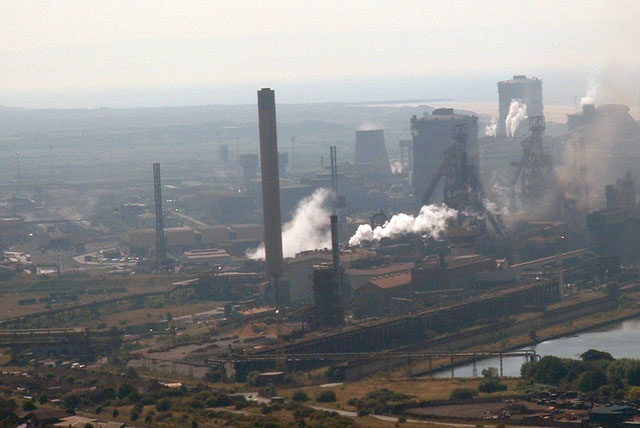
- From the top, View of Port Talbot from above, with the elevated M4 to the bottom-left, The High street, Steelworks

- Location within Neath Port Talbot
- Population: 31,550 (2021)
- OS grid reference: SS755895
- Principal area: Neath Port Talbot
- Preserved county: West Glamorgan
- Country: Wales
- Sovereign state: United Kingdom
- Post town: PORT TALBOT
- Postcode district: SA12, SA13
- Dialling code: 01639
- Police: South Wales
- Fire: Mid and West Wales
- Ambulance: Welsh
- UK Parliament: Aberafan Maesteg
- Senedd Cymru – Welsh Parliament: Afan Ogwr Rhondda
- List of places UK Wales Neath Port Talbot 51°35′26″N 3°47′55″W Map of the community

Port Talbot (/ˌpɔːt ˈtɔːlbət/, UK also /pɔː-, pə-, -ˈtælbət, -ˈtɒlbət/) is an industrial port town and community in the county borough of Neath Port Talbot, Wales, situated on the east side of Swansea Bay, approximately 8 miles (13 km) from Swansea. The Port Talbot Steelworks covers a large area of land which dominates the south east of the town. It is the largest steelworks in the United Kingdom, and one of the largest in the world, but has been under threat of closure since the 1980s. The population was 31,550 in 2021, comprising about a fifth of the 141,931 population of Neath Port Talbot.

== History ==
Modern Port Talbot is a town formed from the merging of multiple villages, including Baglan, Margam, and Aberafan. The name 'Port Talbot' first appears in 1837 as the name of the new docks built on the south-east side of the river Afan by the Talbot family. Over time it came to be applied to the whole of the emerging conurbation.

The earliest evidence of humans in the Port Talbot area has been found on the side of Mynydd Margam where Bronze Age farming ditches can be found from 4,000 BC. There were Iron Age hill forts on Mynydd Dinas, Mynydd Margam, Mynydd Emroch and other nearby hills. Mynydd Hawdref contains remains of an ancient Iron Age village. The Margam deer herd dates from Norman times but deer in the area were mentioned during Roman occupation.

Ffynnon Pedr is a holy well which flows from the hillside through a 16 in × 16 in (400 mm × 400 mm) stone culvert in Margam. This may have been a water supply for Margam Abbey, 1/2 mile (800 metres) to the east.

The Cross of Brancuf is an early Christian sculptured stone which stands in the church of St Catharine at Baglan. It is an intricately sculptured cross-slab with a Latin cross and an inscription recalling Brancuf. Originally it stood in the old St Baglan's church but that fell into ruin in the late 19th century and the slab was removed to St Catharine's. St Baglan (Bagelan), son of King Ithael Hoel of Brittany, was a 6th-century hermit and follower of St Illtud. He founded the first church at the town that now takes his name. In the vestry of St Catharine's church sits a cross-slab dating from the 8th–10th century CE. It is intricately decorated with a Celtic-style cross formed out of knotwork (cord-plait knotwork) and interlacing; the ends of each arm are probably of a Latin design. Its Latin inscription reads FECIT BRANCUF, meaning made by Brancuf'".

The English antiquarian John Leland made an extensive journey through Wales c.1536–39 of which he recorded an itinerary. He passed through Aberafan, which he describes as a "poor village" surrounded by barren ground, and describes the area as heavily wooded, not much of which remains today. He mentions the use of the river mouth as a port. His portrayal of Aberafan as a small, struggling village suggests that the port was not in great use, especially as traffic to and from Margam Abbey would have ceased following its dissolution in 1536.

The area of the parish of Margam lying on the west bank of the lower Afan became industrialised following the establishment of a copperworks in 1770. The Afan was diverted and a dock was opened in 1839 named for the Talbot family, local landowners who were related to the pioneer photographer, William Henry Fox Talbot. The Talbots were patrons of Margam Abbey, and also built Margam Castle. Christopher Rice Mansel Talbot (1803–1890), a Liberal Member of Parliament (MP) for Glamorgan from 1830 until his death, saw the potential of his property as a site for an extensive ironworks, which opened in early 1831.

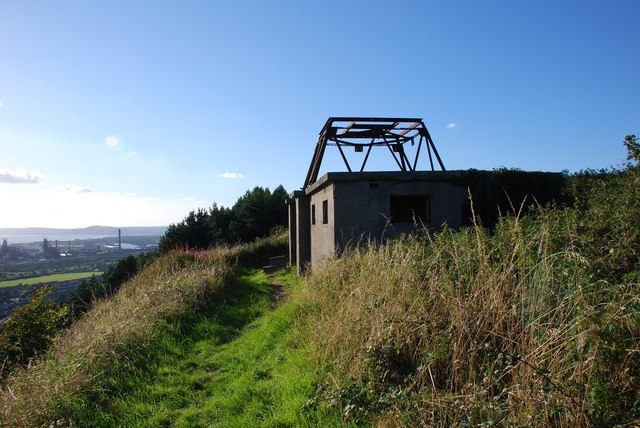
Margam Coast Defence Radar Station

The remains of a Chain Home Low early warning radar station are situated in Margam Country Park, dating from World War II (c. 1941–1943). Designed to guard against enemy surface craft and submarines in the Bristol Channel, the station has three squarish concrete buildings with flat roofs, set on the Margam ridge facing south-east and overlooking the Channel. The most north-westerly building retains the framework of a steel gantry, the base for a rectangular radar transmitter/receiver array, known as a 'bedstead array' from its wires and framework, and is believed to be a unique survivor within the British Isles.

In 1970 a new deep-water harbour was opened, capable of discharging iron ore vessels of 100,000 deadweight tonnage (DWT), a tenfold increase of the old dock. By the early 21st century, due to further modification and dredging, the harbour is capable of harbouring vessels of over 170,000 DWT.

== Governance ==
Arms of Talbot

The borough of Port Talbot was created in November 1921, incorporating Margam, Cwmafan and Aberafan. It was therefore 85 years after the phrase 'Port Talbot' was first used that it became officially recognised as the town's name.

Port Talbot was part of the historic county of Glamorgan. The 1974 county council re-organisation split Glamorgan into three new counties, and Port Talbot became one of the four districts of West Glamorgan.

Following the demise of West Glamorgan County Council in 1996, Port Talbot borough council was merged with Neath and part of Lliw Valley Districts to create the new unitary authority of Neath Port Talbot County Borough. The Civic Centre is located in Port Talbot, and the town is represented by three of the 64 councillors that make up the county council.

The centre of the town is covered by the Port Talbot ward for local council elections.

== Physical geography ==
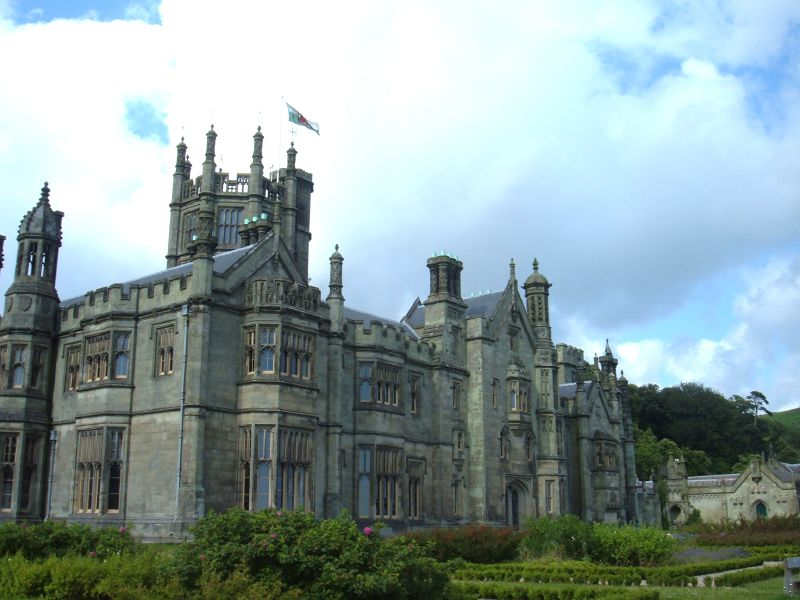
Margam Castle, not far from Margam Abbey

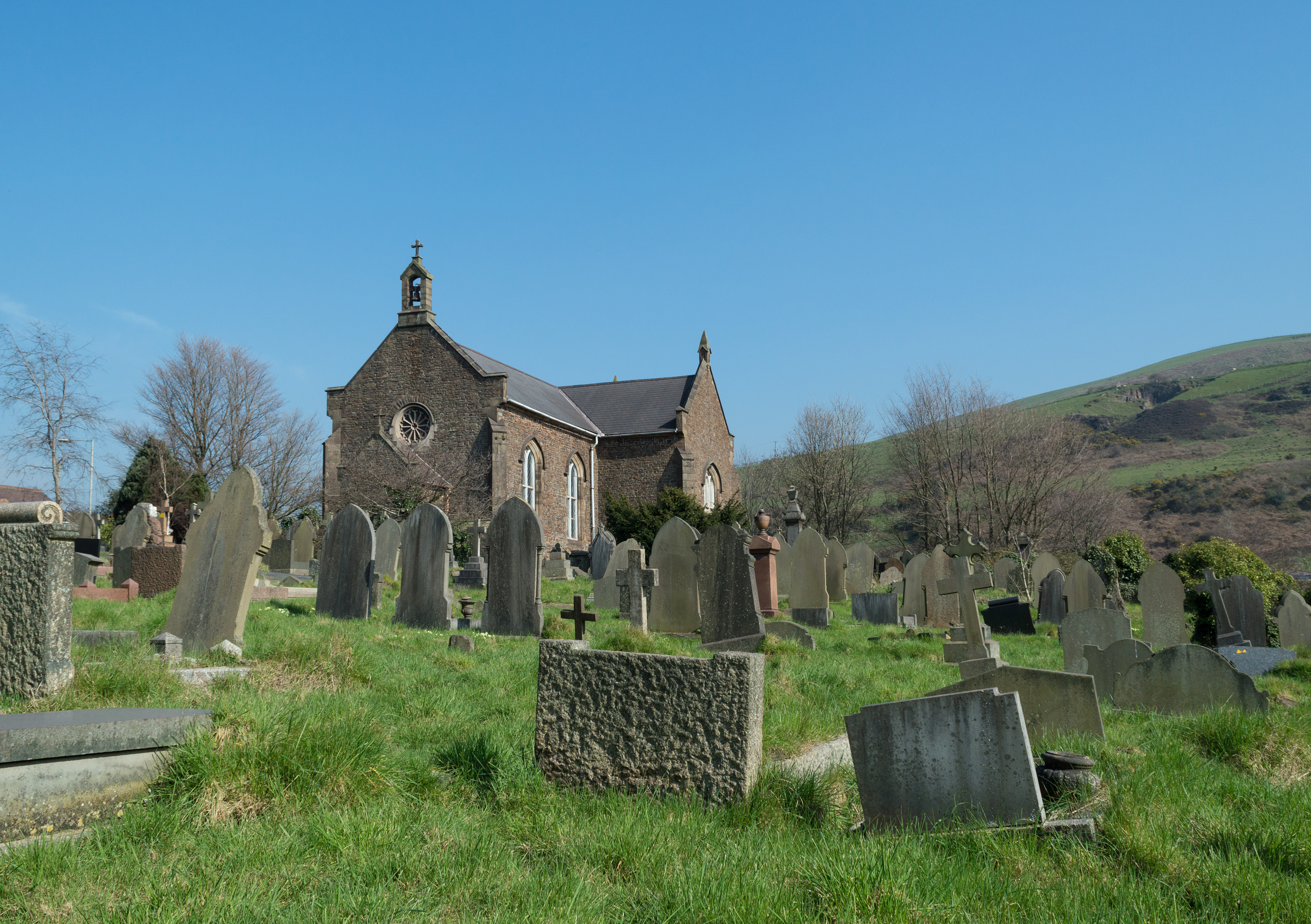
Holy Cross Church

Port Talbot occupies an area of low lying coastal plain between Swansea Bay to the west (within the Bristol Channel) and the hills and valleys of Margam Moors (which are part of the wider South Wales valleys) to the south. The town is built along the eastern rim of Swansea Bay in a narrow strip of coastal plain surrounding the River Afan estuary. Swansea is visible on the opposite side of the bay. The local beach is known as Aberafan Sands and is situated along the edge of the bay between the River Afan and the River Neath. The other beach in Port Talbot is Margam Sands, popularly known as Morfa Beach. The north-western edge of the town is marked by the River Neath. A landmark in the town is the Port Talbot Steelworks.

== Human geography ==
With heavy industry and an urban motorway, Port Talbot was reported as having the worst air pollution in Wales in 2005 with a PM_{10} particulate level of 30 μg/m^{3} (micrograms per cubic metre). By 2018 the air quality had improved to meet the WHO's recommended limit of 10 μg/m^{3}.

According to the Office for National Statistics the Neath Port Talbot population had increased by 1.8 percent, from around 139,800 in 2011 to 142,300 in 2021. This was higher than the overall increase for Wales (1.4 percent), where the population grew by 44,000 to 3,107,500. In 2021 Neath Port Talbot ranked ninth for total population out of 22 local authority areas in Wales. This amounts to a fall of one place in a decade. As of 2021 Neath Port Talbot was the 11th least densely populated of Wales' 22 local authority areas. There had been an increase of 15.5 percent in people aged 65 years and over, a decrease of 2.3 percent in people aged 15 to 64 years, and an increase of 2.5 percent in children aged under 15 years.

== Unemployment ==
Of Port Talbot's population in 2000, 63 percent were between the ages of 15 and 64. Male unemployment in 2000 was around 9 percent. Female unemployment was around 6 percent in 2000.

== Social deprivation ==
In 2010, 26.2 percent of children and young persons (under the age of 20) in Neath Port Talbot county borough were living in relative poverty, higher than the 22.2 percent Welsh average.

According to the Office for National Statistics, between April 2012 to March 2013 25,400 residents, that is 7.8 percent, between the ages of 16 and 64 were economically inactive. 60,100 residents, that is 70.3 percent, between the ages of 16 and 64 were economically active.

== Geology ==
Port Talbot has a variety of bedrock and drift types.

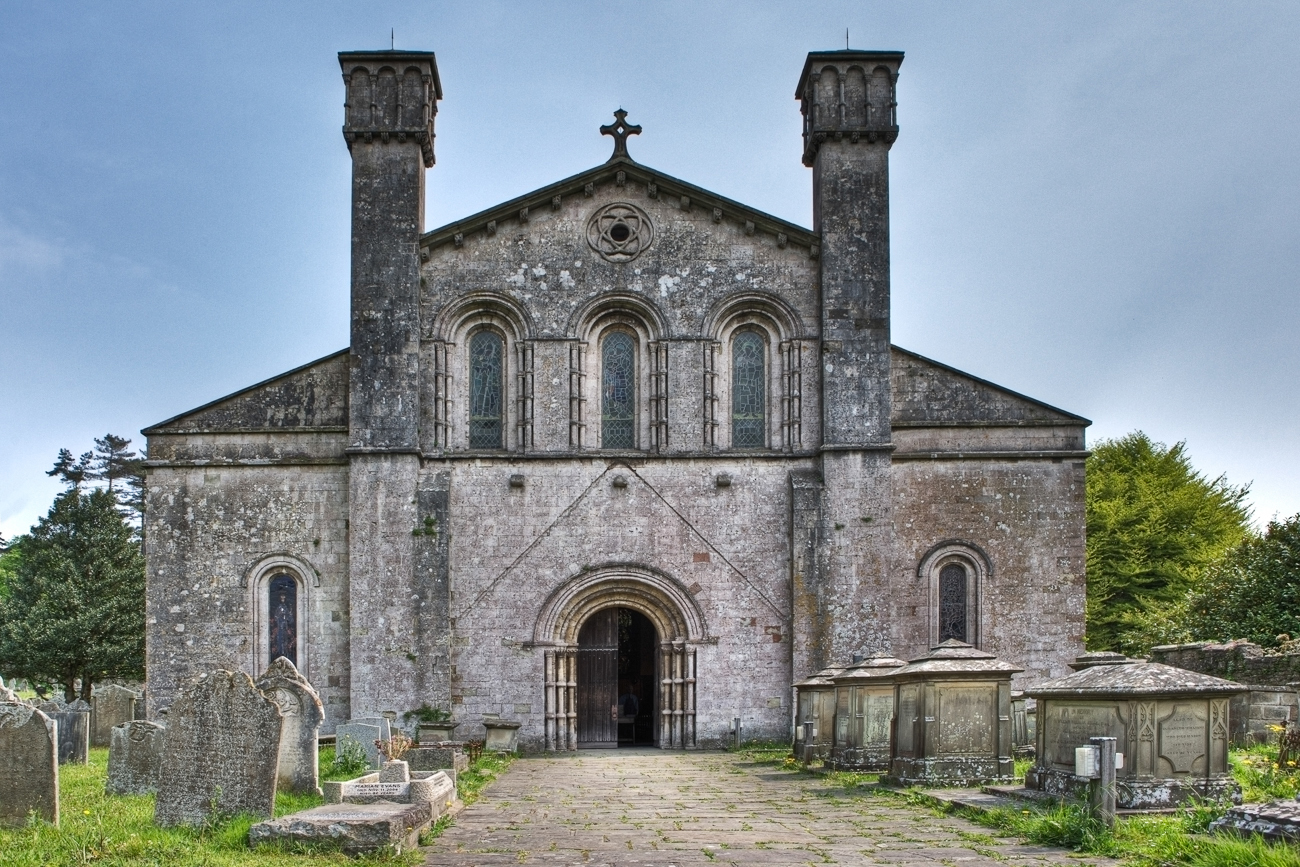
Margam Abbey

=== Bedrock geology ===
South East of Port Talbot is dominated by Pennant sandstone which forms this high relief area including Mynydd Margam, Mynydd Dinas and the other mountains. The pennant sandstone is made up of two formations which are the Rhondda Member and Brithdir Member. The sandstone formed in Carboniferous swamps 300 million years ago. Pennant sandstone is a micacous sandstone which has a brown colouration with areas of red staining where iron from pyrite in coal has weathered creating a rust colouration.

Lower land areas are predominantly Pennant sandstone within the South Wales Coal Measures Group.

=== Drift geology ===
There is a variety of drift deposits in Port Talbot. Sandfields area of Port Talbot is built upon blown sand and tidal flat deposits. These were deposited by the wind via aeolian processes and the water by fluvial processes. Velindre area of Port Talbot is built upon an alluvial fan deposit. This deposit formed during the last glacial period 14,000 years ago. Baglan Road in Port Talbot is built upon glacial till from the Devensian period. Till, also known as boulder clay, is a mix of unconsolidated sediment with a range of grain sizes. This forms as the fronts of glaciers rapidly deposit material due to melting. Cwmafan in Port Talbot is built upon alluvial and glaciofluvial deposits, formed from glacial meltwater. Baglan Moors, Fairfield and Port Talbot town centre are built upon tidal flat deposits (tides were higher 12,000 years ago allowing sandy deposits to accumulate).

=== Economic geology ===
Coal seams within the Pennant sandstone run north west-south-east and east–west. The coal seams arise from the South Wales Middle Coal Measures Formation, South Wales Upper Coal Measures Formation, South Wales Lower Coal Measures Formation, Rhondda Member and Brithdir Member. Pennant sandstone is an excellent construction rock and road stone.

=== Structural geology ===
Faults have an orientation of North West-South East, east–west and north–south. All are normal faults which form extension processes. There are also many marine fossils bands.

=== Bio-stratigraphy/palaeontology ===
Marine fossils found in Port Talbot region include species of bivalves, gastropods and brachiopods. Terrestrial fossils include fern tree branches, trunks, leaves and roots. Traces of organism footprints can also be found.

=== Engineering geology ===
The drift geology average thickness is between 3 and 20 metres (10 and 66 ft). Several landslips occur in the highlands including many bole holes historically made for the construction of the M4 motorway, steelworks and coal mines.

=== Hydro-geology ===
Rivers in the region are fault guided meaning that they flow is highly influenced by a structural weakness called a fault. Several natural springs occur in the highland regions with a neutral to slightly acidic ph values. Natural groundwater levels varies from 10 metres (35 ft) below the Taibach area of Port Talbot to over 20 metres (65 ft). Rivers in the region including the River Afan (Aberafan), River Neath (Baglan Bay), Ffrwdwyllt (Taibach), Arnallt Brook (Taibach), Baglan Brook (Baglan), River Kenfig (Morfa Beach) and other rivers are fast flowing and are highly influenced by their mouths (end of the rivers, tidal region). A spout can be found in Baglan Park in the Baglan region of Port Talbot. Many open and uncovered reservoirs exist in the region. Water has been channelled into ditches in industrial areas of Port Talbot.

== Education ==
There are four comprehensive schools situated within the Port Talbot area:

- Ysgol Cwm Brombil
- St. Joseph's Catholic School & Sixth Form Centre
- Ysgol Bae Baglan
- Ysgol Gymraeg Ystalyfera Bro Dur – the Bro Dur campus in is Port Talbot

Glan Afan Comprehensive School and Sandfields Comprehensive School closed in 2016.

A campus of Neath Port Talbot College is located in the Margam area. The Margam campus was previously called Afan College.

The University of South Wales has a campus at Baglan Energy Park called the Hydrogen Centre, which includes a Renewable Hydrogen Research and Development Centre.

== Arts and culture ==
Port Talbot has been called "fertile ground for movie stars" with former residents including Anthony Hopkins, Richard Burton and Ronald Lewis.

=== South Wales Miners' Museum ===
The South Wales Miners' Museum is located in Cynonville, Cymmer.

=== Margam Stones Museum ===
The nearby Margam Stones Museum has early Christian inscribed stones and Celtic crosses, including four from the area now under the Steelworks. A Roman milestone, an 8th-century pillar, and two Celtic crosses from the 10th century were all rescued from the steelworks site by the Talbot family and taken to Margam, where they are now in the museum, in the care of Cadw.

=== The Baked Bean Museum of Excellence ===
The Baked Bean Museum of Excellence was a private museum in Port Talbot. The Baked Bean Museum Of Excellence closed in 2023.

=== Banksy mural ===
In December 2018 the artist Banksy confirmed that he produced a mural painted on the corner of a garage close to Port Talbot steelworks. On one side it depicts a boy playing in what appears to be snowfall, but the other side shows the snowfall is ash falling from a bin fire. In May 2019, the mural was moved to a gallery in the town's Ty'r Orsaf building.

=== The Passion ===
In April 2011, actor Michael Sheen led a 72-hour National Theatre Wales production of a modern retelling of The Passion. The play began at 5:30 am on Good Friday with a seafront scene, inspired by John the Baptist's baptism of Jesus, which was watched by hundreds who had heard about it by word of mouth.

By the time the first main part of the play was performed on Aberafan Beach at 3:00 pm, organisers estimated up to 6,000 people had gathered to watch.

On Saturday, there were sequences in Llewellyn Street, the Castle Street underpass, Aberafan Shopping Centre, the Seaside Social and Labour Club in Sandfields and nearby Abbeyville Court.

On Easter Sunday, the production returned to Aberafan Beach as part of the finale. A trial was performed on Civic Square before a procession from Station Road, with the final scene, "the cross", at Aberafan seafront. By the time the procession had reached the seafront close to where it had begun 72 hours earlier, organisers estimate over 13,000 people had come to watch on the small roundabout.

In April 2012, Michael Sheen returned to attend the world premiere of the feature-length film The Gospel of Us based on The Passion. The premiere was held at the Apollo Cinema (now the Reel Cinema) on the Aberafan seafront close to where The Passion took place. Tickets for the premiere sold out weeks before the showing; all six screens showed the film simultaneously. The film was also shown daily from Easter Sunday to the following Thursday prior to its UK-wide release the next day.

== Media ==
Port Talbot is served by several Independent Local Radio stations: Hits Radio South Wales, its sister station Greatest Hits Radio South Wales, Swansea Bay Radio, Heart South Wales and Nation Radio Wales. Radio Phoenix also operates a 24-hour hospital radio service for the patients and staff of Neath Port Talbot Hospital in Baglan Moors.

In 2005 the area was granted its first radio station when Afan FM, the inspiration of a group of local young people, was awarded a five-year licence by Ofcom to serve Port Talbot and Neath. Afan FM broadcast from the AquaDome leisure complex on Aberafan Seafront. Following a December 2009 fire at the AquaDome, Afan FM moved to Aberafan House, adjacent to the town's shopping centre. Afan FM closed in December 2011 was shut down following an unexpected tax bill.

The town has been served by several newspapers. The Port Talbot Guardian was a weekly paper published by Media Wales, part of the Trinity Mirror group, but ceased publication in October 2009. The Swansea-based daily South Wales Evening Post and the weekly Courier and Tribune are distributed in the town and are published by Media Wales, part of the Reach plc group.

The Welsh-language song competition Cân i Gymru is usually filmed in Port Talbot. TV programmes such as Doctor Who and The Sarah Jane Adventures have filmed in the town.

The 2017 crime drama television series Bang is set in Port Talbot.

Terry Gilliam has recounted how he was inspired to create the movie Brazil after hearing a transistor radio play the song Aquarela do Brasil on the beach at Port Talbot.

== Transport ==
=== Railway ===
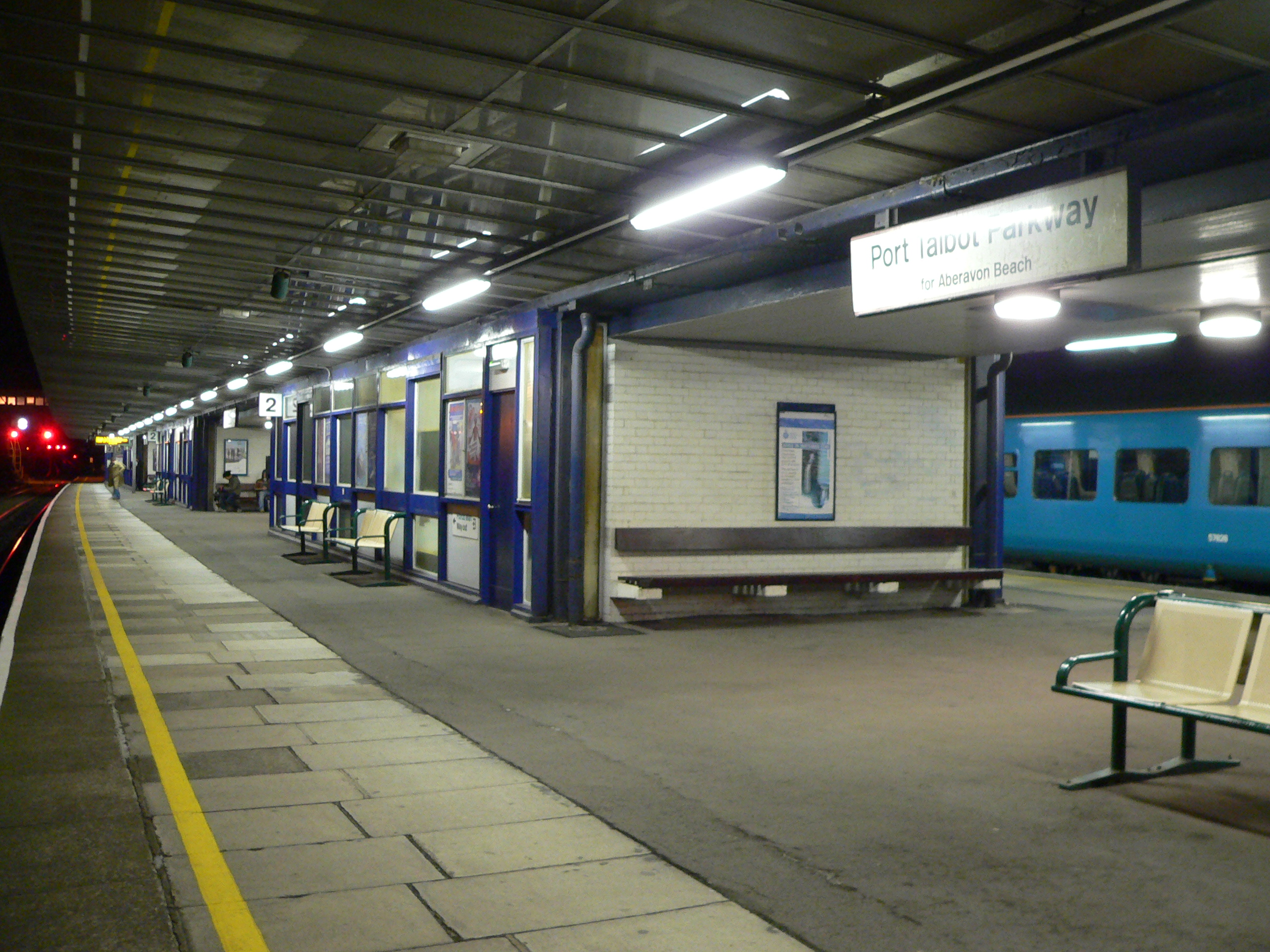
Port Talbot railway station.

Port Talbot is served by the South Wales Main Line at Port Talbot Parkway railway station. Great Western Railway and Transport for Wales serve the station with services westbound to Neath and Swansea and West Wales Line and eastbound to Bridgend, Cardiff Central and London Paddington. Trains also run via Hereford and Shrewsbury to Crewe and Manchester Piccadilly.

The new £5.6 million Integrated Transport hub was completed in 2017, linking Port Talbot Parkway with new bus and taxi links. This also included extensive upgrades to the railway station and surrounding area.

=== Bus ===
Port Talbot bus station, located adjacent to the Aberafan Centre in the centre of the town is the main bus transport hub, it is a National Express stop. Local bus services are provided by First Cymru and South Wales Transport. The bus station's layout is very distinctive for the fact that buses must perform a 270° clockwise turn to exit the station. A Sustrans cycle route has recently been constructed at this bus station as part of the connect2 scheme connecting the Afan Valley with Aberafan beach. A second bus station opened in the town in 2017, at Port Talbot Parkway railway station.

=== M4 motorway ===
The M4 motorway passes through the town from southeast to northwest, crossing a central area on a concrete viaduct, junctions 38 to 41 serve Port Talbot, with junctions 40 and 41 being in the commercial heart of the town. This busy urban stretch of the M4, with tight bends, two-lane carriageways, short narrow slip roads and concrete walls on both sides, was the first length of motorway in Wales when it opened to traffic in 1966. The road has a speed limit of 50 mph (80 km/h) enforced with automatic number-plate recognition speed cameras in both directions. The stretch through Port Talbot town centre is a particular traffic congestion blackspot and there have been calls to close the slip roads at junctions 40 and 41 to improve traffic flow. However some commuters oppose this plan since it would add more time to their journey. A new dual carriageway relief road, the Port Talbot Peripheral Distribution Road (PDR), was completed in 2013. It serves as a distributor road through Port Talbot to the southwest of the M4, beginning at M4 Junction 38 and ending near Junction 41.

=== Port Talbot docks ===
The Port Talbot Docks complex consist of an inner set of floating docks and an outer tidal basin. Construction of the tidal basin began in 1964 and the whole basin covers about 500 acres (200 hectares). The tidal basin is capable of handling ships of up to 170,000 DWT and is used mostly for the import of iron ore and coal for use by nearby Port Talbot Steelworks. The inner floating docks were constructed in 1898 and were closed in 1959. They were re-opened in 1998 for commercial shipping and in March 2007 for the import of some steel products and are capable of handling ships of up to 8,000 dwt. There have been proposals for the development of an intermodal freight terminal at the port.

== Economy ==
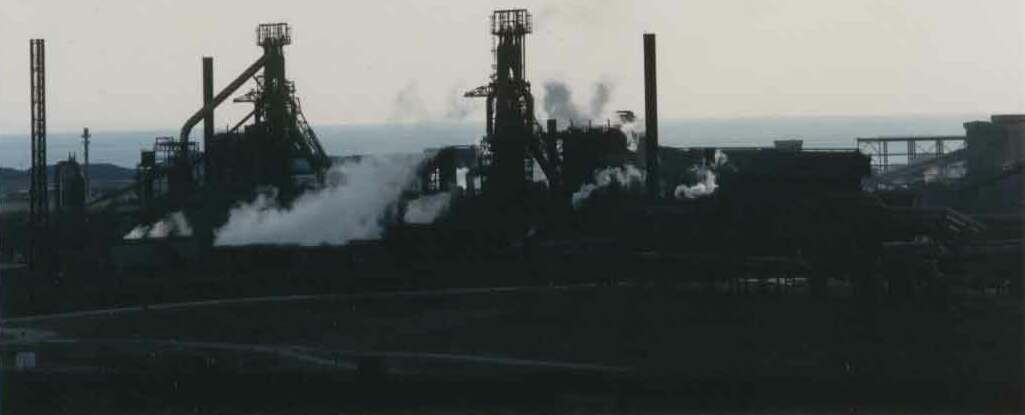
Water vapour rises in front of the blast furnaces at Port Talbot Steelworks

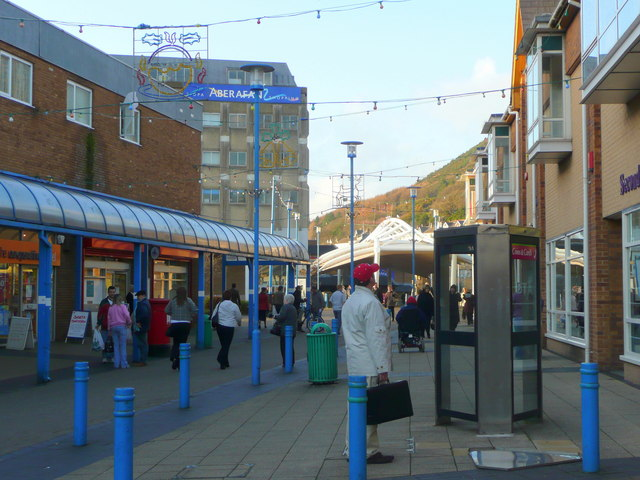
High Street

On 20 November 2007, the Department for Business, Enterprise and Regulatory Reform (BERR) granted consent for the world's largest biomass power station to be built at Port Talbot. The energy plant is capable of generating 40 MW of electricity and commenced energy production in 2019 using Grade-C waste wood sourced from local authorities, civic amenity sites and commercial or industrial sources across South Wales and the South West of England.

Potential future development currently centres around the peripheral distributor road to the south (the dual carriageway road in the Margam and Taibach areas was finished in 2013), Baglan Industrial Park and Baglan Energy Park to the west, Port Talbot Docks to the southwest, Margam Country Park to the east and the Afan Valley to the north. In March 2009 Neath Port Talbot County Borough Council announced a regeneration project for Port Talbot town centre and docks, with a master plan for new homes, offices, light industry, retail developments and improvements to the railway station.

In January 2021, permission was granted for a new £200m adventure resort to open in the Afan Valley. The resort will include ski slopes, zip wires, tree top high-wire courses, Bear Grylls Survival Academy, an aqua adventure park, an equestrian centre, mountain biking, BMX and skate parks, a luxury spa, central plaza with shops and restaurants, 100-bed hotel and 500 luxury lodges.

In May 2022, the Welsh Government announced that a free port known as the Celtic Freeport was to be established in Port Talbot and in Milford Haven. This would focus on various low carbon technologies and aim to attract inward investment.

== Youth organisations ==
Port Talbot is home to a number of youth organisations. They are operated by Neath Port Talbot County Borough Council, the Ministry of Defence and a range of other charitable organisations.

=== Cadet organisations ===
The 499 (Port Talbot) Squadron Air Training Corps, Sea Cadets, Port Talbot Detachment and Dyfed and Glamorgan Army Cadet Force operate in Port Talbot.

== Sea rescue ==
Port Talbot coastguard celebrated its centenary in 2008. The crew are the mud rescue team for the Swansea Bay area and are one of the seven rescue teams in the Gower Sector. Port Talbot inshore lifeboat is operated by the Royal National Lifeboat Institution and operates in the docks, at Aberafan Beach and in the navigable sections of the local rivers.

== Sport ==
=== Rugby ===
The town is part of the Ospreys rugby union region, by which it is represented at the top level of the sport. Other teams include:

- Aberavon RFC, (founded in 1876) who play in the Rugby Union Welsh Premier Division
- Aberavon Quins RFC, (founded in 1891) who play in the WRU League 1 West
- Aberavon Green Stars RFC
- Corus (Port Talbot) RFC
- Taibach RFC
- Neath Port Talbot Steelers, a club which plays in the Rugby League Conference

=== Football ===
Cymru South teams are Trefelin B.G.C., Afan Lido F.C. and Goytre United, all based in the town.

Port Talbot Town, who were relegated from the Cymru South, joined Baglan Dragons F.C. who were promoted to the Ardal Leagues.

Other teams in the town include Afan United, Tata Steel United, Margam FC and Cwmafan FC.

=== Port Talbot Half Marathon ===
The Port Talbot half marathon is an annual event attracting hundreds of runners. The event takes place around the Glyncorrwg ponds and Afan valley area.

=== Other sports ===
- Port Talbot Wheelers cycling club
- TS Multisport, running and triathlon club of employees from the Tata Steel plants in Port Talbot and Llanwern
- Port Talbot Town Cricket Club founded in 1963 and playing in the South Wales Premier Cricket League

Margam Forest to the northeast of the Port Talbot is used as a venue for a stage of the annual Wales Rally GB. In the past, the rally route has traversed Margam Country Park.

Afan Forest Park to the north of the town has a number of dedicated mountain biking trails including the 'Penhydd', 'Y Wâl', 'Skyline', 'White's Level' and 'W²'.

The Aberavon beach is popular for surfing and kite surfing. A local life-saving club operates during the summer months.

== Notable people ==
- William "Mabon" Abraham (1842–1922, b. Cwmafan), trade unionist and politician
- Bennett Arron, writer, comedian, actor and author, brought up in Port Talbot
- Martyn Ashton, British mountain bike trials former world champion and multiple British champion, lives in Port Talbot
- Keith Barnes, Australian rugby league player, born in Port Talbot
- Captain Beany, celebrity charity fundraiser
- Robert Blythe, Welsh actor, played Fagin Hepplewhite in the BBC comedy High Hopes, brought up in Tan y Groes Street.
- Di Botcher, Welsh comedy actress
- Steve Bray, anti-Brexit protester
- Rob Brydon, actor and comedian, brought up in Baglan, Port Talbot
- Richard Burton, born in Pontrhydyfen, Port Talbot as Richard Jenkins and had his early education in Port Talbot where he met his mentor, Philip Burton.
- Gabrielle Creevy, actress, from Port Talbot
- Leondre Devries, part of the singing duo Bars and Melody who came third on Britain's Got Talent in 2014
- Alan Durban, footballer
- Dan Edwards, rugby union player, Ospreys and Wales fly-half
- Ivor Emmanuel, musical theatre and television singer and actor, from Pontrhydyfen, Port Talbot.
- Peg Entwistle, Broadway theatre actress whose 1932 suicide from atop the Hollywood Sign in Los Angeles tagged her as "The Hollywood Sign Girl" was born at 5 Broad Street, Port Talbot on 5 February 1908.
- Professor Sir Christopher Evans, businessman, originally from Port Talbot
- Rebecca Evans, soprano, from Pontrhydyfen, Port Talbot
- William Evans (1883–1968), writer
- Brian Flynn, Welsh footballer, influential in Wales' semi-final run at UEFA Euro 2016
- Bernard Fox, actor, born Bernard Lawson
- Rhod Gilbert, comedian, lives in Port Talbot
- Lateysha Grace, television personality
- Regan Grace, professional rugby league player for St. Helens and Wales national rugby league team
- Richard Hibbard, former rugby union player (Wales and Lions international)
- James Hook, former rugby union player, Ospreys and Wales fly-half
- Sir Anthony Hopkins, actor, born and raised in Margam, Port Talbot
- Geoffrey Howe, politician, born in Port Talbot and spent his early years there. In 1992, he chose the title Baron Howe of Aberavon when he was made a life peer.
- Chris Jenkins British, European and World champion powerlifter
- Clive Jenkins (1926–1999), trade unionist
- Joseph Kappen, serial killer from Port Talbot who murdered a number of girls in the area in the 1970s
- Lloyd Langford, former blacksmith turned comedian, raised in Port Talbot
- Richard Lewis, Esports journalist, born and raised in Port Talbot
- Ronald Lewis (1928–1982), actor
- Martyn Lloyd-Jones (1899–1981, b. Cardiff), Calvinistic Methodist minister who ministered Bethlehem Calvinistic Methodist Chapel, Sandfields, Aberafan from 1926 to 1938 prior to teaching at Westminster Chapel in London
- Michael Locke (1979–2026, b. Neath), aka Pancho of TV series Dirty Sanchez, raised in Baglan, Port Talbot
- Allan Martin, former rugby union player (Wales and Lions international)
- Christina Modestou, Welsh-Greek theatre actress and singer, born 1989
- Christopher Painter, composer, born in 1962
- Colin Pascoe, former Swansea City, Sunderland and Wales international
- Dic Penderyn, was born as Richard Lewis in Aberafan in 1803. He is buried at St Mary's Church, Aberavon, near the centre of the town. He was convicted of assault on an army soldier and executed.
- Paul Potts, an opera singer and the winner of Britain's Got Talent in 2007, lives in Port Talbot
- Linda Sharp, champion surfer from Aberafan, won the European surfing championships twice, the British surfing championships ten times and the Welsh surfing championships 19 times.
- Michael Sheen, Welsh actor was born in Newport but was brought up in Port Talbot
- Rhys Taylor, footballer born in Neath on 7 April 1990
- George Thomas, 1st Viscount Tonypandy was born in Tydraw Street, Port Talbot and was speaker in the House of Commons
- Bonnie Tyler, Singer and songwriter (born Gaynor Hopkins) born in Skewen, Neath, Port Talbot.
- Andrew Vicari, painter was born in Port Talbot
- Freddie Williams, from Margam, was the 1950 and 1953 Speedway World Champion. As of 2013, Williams is the only Welshman to win the championship.
- Professor Gwyn Williams, a Welsh poet, novelist, translator and academic, born in Port Talbot in 1904.

== Special environmental protected sites ==
Port Talbot has several protected sites, including Sites of Special Scientific Interest (SSSI), Special Areas of Conservation (SAC) and a Ramsar wetland site.

- Baglan Moors (An important site for lapwings and other birds and for amphibians)
- Caeau Ton-y-fildre (SSSI)
- Cefn Gwrhyd, Rhydyfro (SSSI)
- Cilybebyll (SSSI)
- Coed Cwm Du, Cilmaengwyn (SSSI)
- Coedydd Nedd a Mellte (SAC)
- Cors Crymlyn / Crymlyn Bog (Ramsar, SSSI, SAC)
- Craig-y-llyn (SSSI)
- Crymlyn Burrows (SSSI)
- Cwm Gwrelych and Nant Llyn Fach Streams (SSSI)
- Dyffrynnoedd Nedd a Mellte, a Moel Penderyn (SSSI)
- Earlswood Road Cutting and Ferryboat Inn Quarries (SSSI)
- Eglwys Nunydd Reservoir (SSSI)
- Fforest Goch Bog (SSSI)
- Frondeg (SSSI)
- Gorsllwyn, Onllwyn (SSSI)
- Gwrhyd Meadows (SSSI)
- Hafod Wennol Grasslands (SSSI)
- Kenfig / Cynffig (SAC), National Nature Reserve)
- Margam Moors (SSSI)
- Mynydd Ty-isaf, Rhondda (SSSI)
- Pant-y-sais (SSSI)
- Tairgwaith (SSSI)

== See also ==
- Aberafan
- Baglan
- Bryn
- Cwmafan
- Goytre
- Margam
- Pontrhydyfen
- Sandfields
- Taibach
