= Afan Forest Park =

Country park in Neath Port Talbot, Wales

Coordinates: 51.632801°N 3.732759°W

Afan Forest Park Welsh: Parc Coedwig Afon
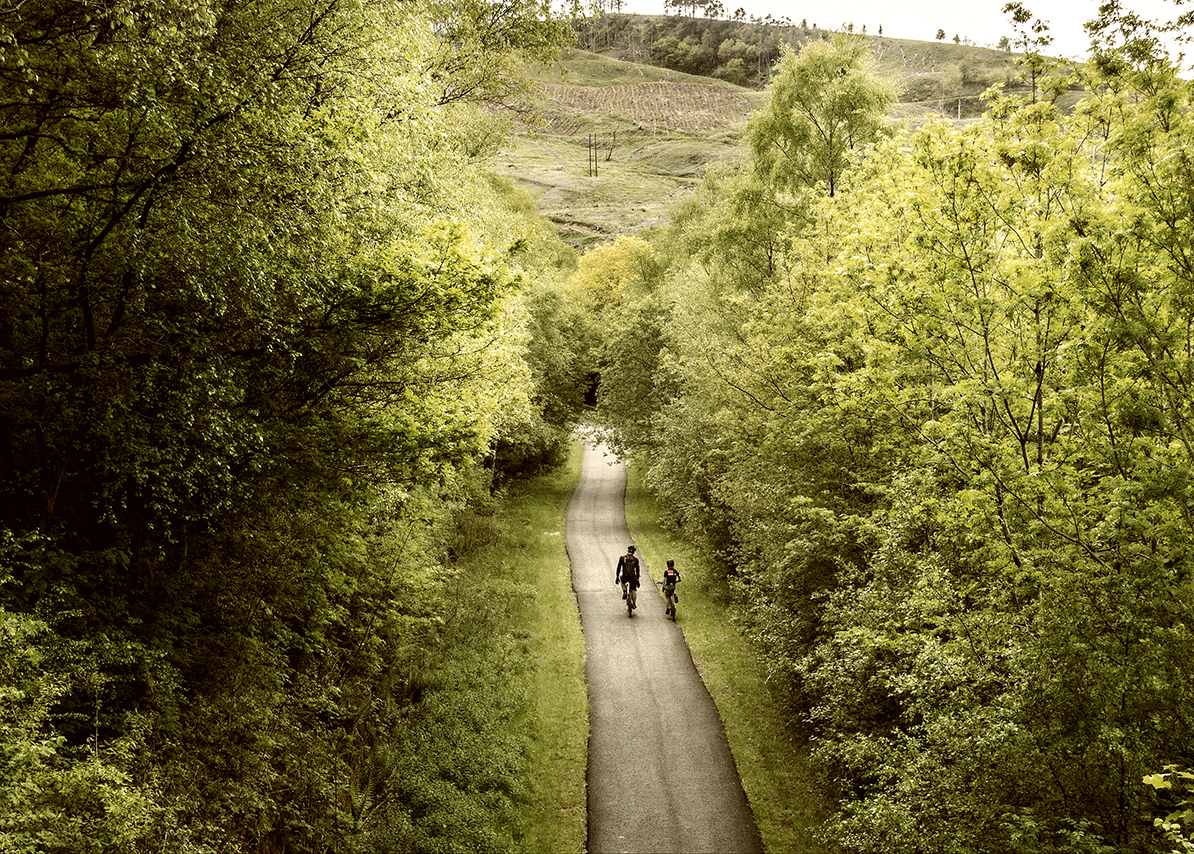
- Interactive map of Afan Forest Park

Geography
- Location: Neath Port Talbot, Wales
- Area: 48 sq mi (120 km^{2})

Administration
- Website: afanforestpark.com

The Afan Forest Park (formally and locally known as Afan Argoed Country Park) is a 48-square-mile (120 km^{2}) forest park in Wales. It is set in the Afan Valley in Neath Port Talbot. It is well known for its mountain biking and hiking or hillwalking trails. It is situated seven miles (11 km) from Junction 40 of the M4 (the Port Talbot turn).

== Trails and waymarked walks ==
As the A4107 meanders through the steep sided valley it is easy to understand why this valley has been developed as a premier mountain bike riding venue in the United Kingdom. The Forest Park also has nine waymarked walking trails, ranging from a 30-minute amble to a 3-4 hour ramble. There are also miles of public rights of way. As well as mountain biking, there is also a network of 25 miles (40 km) of disused railway lines which are used for walking and cycling. These are called the Family Routes, or the Low Level Cycleway. These also form a link between the mountain bike trails.

The Forest Park Centre has camping facilities, with campsites with a shower block and toilet block which can also be used by other visitors. In addition to these basic facilities, the centre also has a café, small local museum on mining, bike shop and a gift shop.

=== Kanji Wood ===
In 2002, Afan Forest Park was officially twinned with the C.W.Nicol Woodland Trust in Kurohime in the Nagano prefecture of Japan. In Afan Forest Park, 'Kanji Wood' was developed on three kanji characters; human, forest and life and landscaped with Japanese trees, shrubs and sculptures.

=== Education and activities ===
The Forest Park runs a schools program with its "Education Ranger" and also organises adult education from the study room at the Forest Park Centre, which is available for private groups. They also do an annual program of walks and activities and have a wildlife puzzle trail for families.

=== Theatre Tymaen ===
Developed in 2006, this is a 300-seat outdoor theatre for drama, music, art and workshops. It is available for hire.

=== Mountain bike trails ===
Penhydd Trail

The Penhydd trail was built by a group of enthusiasts from the local mountain bike club. It's a 22 km loop. This trail was voted as the trail to ride before you die by What Mountain Bike Magazine in 2004.

The Wall Trail

With the success of the Penhydd Trail, the Forestry Commission saw how popular mountain biking was becoming so the Wall trail was built. This is a 24 km mainly single-track loop. The Graveyard section and the final descent of the Wall have been well reviewed.

White's Level Trail

This is a 6 km single-track climb and downhill. There is usually transport available for downhill riders at weekends, from the Glyncorrwg Mountain Bike Centre. The whole trail is 15 km long and has recently been the focus of most new trail building activity. A new section, the NPower Renewables Energy Trail, was opened on 12 October 2007.

Skyline Trail

The newest trail in the valley. This is a 46 km long loop, sharing the same initial climb as White's Level. It is known for the views from the horizon line. The Jetlag section is known for its high difficulty. There are also two 'shortcuts' on the route for riders who are not ready to attempt the whole 46 km.

W^{2} Trail

This is a high level link that connects both The Wall and White's Level.

=== Accommodation ===
Lists of places to stay in and around the park can be found at the Afan Forest Park website.

2015 Update: A new campsite has opened in Afan Forest Park called Willow Springs Campsite.

== Media ==
Afan Forest park was named in the top ten places in the world to "ride before you die" by What Mountain Bike Magazine. Other destinations named included Whistler, Canada.

The high bridge in the park was used as a recurring filming location for the Channel 4/Netflix black comedy The End of the F***ing World.

== Forestry ==
Large numbers of larch trees infected with Phytophthora ramorum have been felled, to be replaced by mixed species for timber production.
