= Grade II* listed buildings in Neath Port Talbot =

Neath Port Talbot shown within Wales

In the United Kingdom, the term listed building refers to a building or other structure officially designated as being of special architectural, historical, or cultural significance; Grade II* structures are those considered to be "particularly important buildings of more than special interest". Listing was begun by a provision in the Town and Country Planning Act 1947. Once listed, strict limitations are imposed on the modifications allowed to a building's structure or fittings. In Wales, the authority for listing under the Planning (Listed Buildings and Conservation Areas) Act 1990 rests with Cadw.

== Buildings ==
Name	Location Grid Ref. (Note: Sometimes known as OSGB36, the grid reference is based on the British national grid reference system used by the Ordnance Survey.) Geo-coordinates	Date Listed	Function	Notes	Reference Number	Image
Church of Saint Cattwg, Blaenhonddan	Blaenhonddan; SS7559298572; 51°40′20″N 3°48′02″W	20 June 1963	Church	In a prominent position on a bend on the SE side of Church Road.	11767	See more images
Rheola House	Glynneath; SN8385204211; 51°43′28″N 3°40′59″W	15 May 1973	House	In parkland to the N of the B4242 between Resolven and Glynneath.	11771	See more images
Neath Castle	Neath; SS7536697795; 51°39′54″N 3°48′13″W	1 May 1989	Castle	Situated between the Hall and Castle Street at the northern end of the Old Town.	11775	See more images
Church of St Thomas, Neath	Neath; SS7532597673; 51°39′50″N 3°48′15″W	15 August 1975	Church	Located in a spacious churchyard within Church Place.	11776	See more images
Parish church of St Illtyd, Neath	Llantwit Road, Neath; SS7619598038; 51°40′03″N 3°47′30″W	20 June 1963	Church	Built in 13th century or earlier with restoration of 1859.	11797	See more images
Parish church of St David, Neath	Neath; SS7540997504; 51°39′45″N 3°48′10″W	1 May 1989	Church	Built 1864-1866 in French 13th century gothic style.	11818	See more images
Aberdulais Aqueduct	Aberdulais, (Blaenhonddan & Tonna); SS7726999281; 51°40′44″N 3°46′35″W	29 January 1980	Viaduct	Ten stone arches create the longest aqueduct in South Wales, built in 1823, to carry the Tennant Canal over the River Neath, west of Aberdulais Basin where it joins the Neath canal. It is also a scheduled monument. Additional reference numbers: 22861	11838	See more images
Cefn Coed Colliery, No. 1 Shaft Headframe	Crynant; SN7851503221; 51°42′52″N 3°45′36″W	16 November 1990	Colliery headstock	Located at the Cefn Coed Colliery Museum in the Dulais Valley, on the A4109 two miles north of Aberdulais.	11858	Cefn Coed Colliery, No. 1 Shaft Headframe
Cefn Coed Colliery, No. 2 Shaft Headframe	Crynant; SN7853003325; 51°42′56″N 3°45′35″W	16 November 1990	Headstock	Located at the Cefn Coed Colliery Museum in the Dulais Valley, on the A4109 two miles north of Aberdulais.	11859	Cefn Coed Colliery, No. 2 Shaft Headframe
Cefn Coed Colliery chimney and boiler house flue	Crynant; SN7855303303; 51°42′55″N 3°45′34″W	2 April 1991	Colliery chimney	Located at the Cefn Coed Colliery Museum in the Dulais Valley, on the A4109 two miles north of Aberdulais. The tall brick stack forms a considerable landmark immediately adjacent to the main road.	11860	Cefn Coed Colliery chimney and boiler house flue
Cefn Coed Colliery Boilerhouse	Crynant; SN7854203254; 51°42′53″N 3°45′34″W	2 April 1991	Boilerhouse	Located at the Cefn Coed Colliery Museum in the Dulais Valley, on the A4109 two miles north of Aberdulais. The boilers are in the centre of the Museum complex, housed beneath a corrugated roof.	11861	Cefn Coed Colliery Boilerhouse
Cefn Coed Colliery Engine House Range and Steam Capstan Engine	Crynant; SN7855003213; 51°42′52″N 3°45′34″W	2 April 1991	Engine House and capstan	At Cefn Coed Colliery Museum in the Dulais Valley, on the A4109 2 miles N of Aberdulais. The engine house range of 3 gabled buildings adjacent to the main road. The steam capstan engine situated immediately adjacent to W side of the central building.	11863	Cefn Coed Colliery Engine House Range and Steam Capstan Engine
St. Cadoc's Church, Glynneath	Glynneath; SN8698306141; 51°44′33″N 3°38′18″W	25 February 1993	Church	Set in a small churchyard to SE of the ruins of Aberpergwm House; reached from the main drive to the house which leads off the main road SW of Glynneath.	11867	See more images
Hen Eglwys	Margam; SS8012486518; 51°33′53″N 3°43′51″W	11 December 1952	Church	Located on the hillside, Graig Fawr, north of Margam Park. Accessed by a footpath which leads SW off the road along Cwm Bach. In a prominent and spectacular position.	14155	See more images
Old Park	Margam; SS8069885022; 51°33′05″N 3°43′19″W	6 August 1972	House	The road runs SW off the A48 and the house is at the end.	14158	Upload Photo
Church of St Theodore, Port Talbot	Port Talbot; SS7725589098; 51°35′14″N 3°46′23″W	24 February 1975	Church	Set within a rectangular walled churchyard, with memorial park to the R and vicarage and mission room to the L.	14160	See more images
Terrace Walls and Screen at Margam Castle	Margam; SS8044786250; 51°33′45″N 3°43′34″W	24 February 1975	Terrace Wall and Screen	On the W side of Margam Castle	14163	Terrace Walls and Screen at Margam Castle
Beulah Calvinistic Methodist Chapel	Margam; SS7837387422; 51°34′21″N 3°45′23″W	9 January 1976	Chapel	Located at the N end of Tollgate Park.	14172	See more images
Ebenezer Chapel	Aberavon; SS7655690201; 51°35′50″N 3°47′01″W	22 July 1980	Chapel	In a prominent position in the square between the shopping centre and the Civic Centre, and backing onto the River Afan.	14174	See more images
Llanmihangel Mill	Margam; SS8192182354; 51°31′40″N 3°42′13″W	9 September 1992	Mill	Located N of the Afon Cynffig on a track which leads off Marlas Road in Pyle. Part of Llanmihangel Mill Farm.	14176	Upload Photo
Bont Fawr Aqueduct	Pontrhydyfen (Pelenna & Cwmavon); SS7956194070; 51°37′57″N 3°44′30″W	21 March 2000	Aqueduct	Spanning the Afan valley, it was built to carry water to Cwmafon iron works. Now a footpath and cycleway. Additional reference numbers: 22890	23022	See more images
Godre'r Rhos Independent Chapel and vestry	Crynant; SN7911906543; 51°44′40″N 3°45′08″W	29 March 2000	Chapel	Situated some 1km to the N of Crynant set back on the E side of the minor road to Ystradgynlais.	23080	Godre'r Rhos Independent Chapel and vestry
Melincwrt Independent Chapel	Resolven; SN8263301695; 51°42′06″N 3°41′59″W	29 March 2000	Chapel	Situated above and SW of Resolven on the E bank of Melin Court Brook.	23083	Melincwrt Independent Chapel
Capel y Tabernacl	Gwaun-Cae-Gurwen; SN7045010816; 51°46′52″N 3°52′46″W	29 March 2000	Chapel	Situated on the N side of Cwmgors some 100m S of the junction of Heol-y-gors and Llwyn Road.	23088	See more images
Port Talbot War Memorial	Port Talbot; SS7731989063; 51°35′13″N 3°46′20″W	28 April 2000	War Memorial	The focal point of the memorial park, in the centre of the main avenue.	23256	See more images
Llanmihangel, Margam	Margam; SS8155882866; 51°31′56″N 3°42′32″W	25 April 2000	House	Located at the end of a track which runs N off Marlas Road, Pyle. N of Llanmihangel Mill Farm.	23262	Upload Photo
Terrace with Pools and Flower Beds fronting Margam Orangery	Margam; SS8011686215; 51°33′43″N 3°43′51″W	25 April 2000	Terrace	Immediately in front of and adjoining Margam Orangery.	23267	Terrace with Pools and Flower Beds fronting Margam Orangery
Monastic Baths, Margam	Margam; SS8030486920; 51°34′06″N 3°43′42″W	25 April 2000	Baths	Located on the W bank of the Afon Cwm Bach, on the E side of a track. To the N, the track bends round sharply to the E, over the river, and on to Cwm Maelwg Farm.	23274	Upload Photo
Service Buildings including Courtyard Walls at Margam Castle	Margam; SS8055286290; 51°33′46″N 3°43′29″W	24 February 1975	Castle buildings	Adjoining the E side of Margam Castle, built around 1836 on completion of the main house. Now visitor, educational and office facilities for the Country Park.	23278	Service Buildings including Courtyard Walls at Margam Castle
Dock walls and gate between inner dock and outer basin at Briton Ferry Docks	Briton Ferry; SS7372193641; 51°37′39″N 3°49′33″W	19 May 2000	Dock Walls and gate	On the S side of the elevated M4 400m E of the River Neath.	23299	Upload Photo
Canal Aqueduct over Afon Twrch, including weir	Ystalyfera; SN7727009240; 51°46′06″N 3°46′48″W	20 December 2002	Aqueduct	Built in 1798 to carry the Swansea Canal over the Afon Twrch which is the boundary with Powys. It is now a cycle track and is also a scheduled monument.	80809	Canal Aqueduct over Afon Twrch, including weir
Church of Saint Peter, Pontardawe	Pontardawe; SN7226804133; 51°43′17″N 3°51′02″W	13 March 2003	Church	Situated on the S side of the High Street in a prominent position.	80986	See more images
No. 1 Blast Furnace at former Neath Abbey Ironworks	Dyffryn Clydach; SS7379397785; 51°39′53″N 3°49′34″W	22 December 2003	Blast Furnace	On W side of the River Clydach in Neath Abbey. At 16.2 metres (53 ft) tall, they were the highest masonry blast furnaces ever built. No 1 is on the right in the picture. The site is also a scheduled monument	82332	No. 1 Blast Furnace at former Neath Abbey Ironworks
No. 2 Blast Furnace at former Neath Abbey Ironworks	Dyffryn Clydach; SS7379397753; 51°39′52″N 3°49′34″W	22 December 2003	Blast Furnace	Located 140m N of the junction of Neath Abbey Road and Monastery Road, with No 1 furnace 30m beyond. The two furnaces were in use from 1793 to 1886 making locomotives, steamships, etc. No 2 is still visible above the rockface from Longford Road.	82333	No. 2 Blast Furnace at former Neath Abbey Ironworks

== See also ==
- List of Scheduled Monuments in Neath Port Talbot
- Grade I listed buildings in Neath Port Talbot
- Registered historic parks and gardens in Neath Port Talbot
