= List of scheduled monuments in Neath Port Talbot =

Scheduled monuments in Neath Port Talbot, Wales.
=Prehistoric =Roman =Early Medieval
=Medieval =Post-Medieval/Modern

Neath Port Talbot County Borough stretches from the south coast of Wales up to the southern edge of the Brecon Beacons. The 93 scheduled monuments include 43 prehistoric sites which include a stone circle, standing stones, burial mounds and chambered tombs. The six Roman sites are all connected to military occupation. There are 18 medieval sites which include abbeys, castles and churches. The 26 post-medieval sites are mostly connected to over 400 years of industrial activity in the area. All of the sites on this list (and the whole of Neath Port Talbot County Borough) are within the historic county of Glamorgan. Five of the sites lie on or cross the border into neighbouring counties, and are included on both lists.

Scheduled monuments have statutory protection. It is illegal to disturb the ground surface or any standing remains. The compilation of the list is undertaken by Cadw Welsh Historic Monuments, which is an executive agency of the National Assembly of Wales. The list of scheduled monuments below is supplied by Cadw with additional material from RCAHMW and Glamorgan-Gwent Archaeological Trust.

== Scheduled monuments in Neath Port Talbot ==
Image	Name	Site type	Community	Location	Details	Period	SAM No & Refs
Iron Age enclosure within Briton Ferry Woods	Craig Ty-Isaf Camp	Hillfort	Baglan	51.6254°N 3.7979°W, SS756933	One of three hillforts on Mynydd-y-Gaer. It is on the SW side of the hill, overlooking Baglan, an oval hillfort enclosing some 0.2ha. Two banks, and on the east a third added later, mean that the area of banks and ditches encompasses a much larger area. Internal features are thought to be more recent test cuts for mineral extraction.	Prehistoric (Iron Age)	GM263
	Foel Chwern Round Cairn	Round cairn	Blaengwrach	51.7228°N 3.5962°W, SN898038	Grass covered cairn on the edge of a steep escarpment above the Neath valley, one of six along a 6 km stretch of the hillside. An old telegraph pole in its centre once supported aircraft warning lights.	Prehistoric (Bronze Age)	GM235
Buarth y Gaer Iron Age Hill Fort	Buarth-y-Gaer, Mynydd-y-Gaer	Hillfort	Briton Ferry	51.6276°N 3.7849°W, SS765939	Iron Age hillfort some 100m across, with a Bronze Age burial cairn inside, at the highest point of Mynydd-y-Gaer.	Prehistoric (Iron Age)	GM054
	Carreg Hir Standing Stone, Pen-Rhiw-Tyn	Standing stone	Briton Ferry	51.6428°N 3.8158°W, SS744953	Sandstone slab nearly 3 m high in the playground at Cwrt Sart School. Now set in concrete, it may be in its original position	Prehistoric (Bronze Age)	GM170
Gaer Fawr hillfort looking north toward Neath.	Gaer Fawr Camp	Hillfort	Briton Ferry	51.6331°N 3.785°W, SS765942	An oval enclosure on the northern slope of Mynydd y Gaer. Complex concentric banks form an enclosure, with 5 cairns amongst the defenses.	Prehistoric (Iron Age)	GM055
	Burial Chamber at Pen-yr-Alltwen	Chambered tomb?	Cilybebyll	51.7141°N 3.8375°W, SN731033	First noted in 1923 as a possible chambered tomb, it is uncertain if it is a manmade structure. The 'capstone' may be natural geology.	Prehistoric (Neolithic)	GM514
	Cefn Celfi Standing Stones	Standing stone	Cilybebyll	51.7124°N 3.8226°W, SN741030	Two stone blocks, one in a hedge, the other a little to the south in a field, between Cefn Celfi Farm and Rhos. It is thought there were once three stones, described in the 9th century 'Englynion y Beddau' as the graves of Cynon, Cynfael and Cynfeli.	Prehistoric (Bronze Age)	GM342
Cwm Caca, somewhere near the enclosure	Carn Caca Enclosure	Enclosure	Clyne and Melincourt	51.6869°N 3.6814°W, SN838000	Hillfort Camp on the Carn Caca hillside, beside the steep valley 280 m south of Melin Court Brook. Two hut circles are within the defended enclosure. A Roman Marching Camp (GM367) is alongside.	Prehistoric (Iron Age)	GM366
	Pen-Rhiw-Angharad Round Cairns	Cairnfield	Clyne and Melincourt	51.678°N 3.7368°W, SS800991	A group of at least 8 cairns on a moorland ridge near Pen-Rhiw-Angharad Isaf. The NE corner of the Blaen Cwm Bach Roman Camp (GM258) is 150m to the south.	Prehistoric (Bronze Age)	GM276
	Carn Caca Cairnfield	Kerb cairn	Clyne and Melincourt	51.6933°N 3.7053°W, SN822007	Three Round Cairns on the NW slopes of Carn Caca, south of Melincourt. Two are cairns, the third a ring of stones, 18 still standing, up to 50 cm high, that were the kerb edgings of a kerb cairn.	Prehistoric (Bronze Age)	GM385
	Gelli-Bwch Round Cairn	Round cairn	Coedffranc	51.637°N 3.8505°W, SS720947	Oval cairn on the summit of ridge west of the Neath estuary, it forms a prominent mound 20m across, and 1.8m high, with a central hollow where it has at some point been dug out.	Prehistoric (Bronze Age)	GM290
	Llandarcy Round Cairn	Round cairn	Coedffranc	51.6427°N 3.8535°W, SS718953	Grass-covered mound with one prominent slab which may be a cist capstone. It is 800 m north of Gelli-Bwch Cairn	Prehistoric (Bronze Age)	GM291
Mynydd March Hywel trig point	Mynydd Marchywel summit cairn	Round cairn	Crynant	51.7191°N 3.7848°W, SN768037	Heap of stones, now gradually spreading, on the summit of Mynydd Marchywel, 10m north of a trig pont. There are traces of kerbstones amongst the rubble.	Prehistoric (Bronze Age)	GM327
	Coed Ddu ring cairn	Ring cairn	Crynant	51.7425°N 3.7288°W, SN807062	Circular feature, 13m across - thought to be a ring cairn, although a possible entrance suggests other interpretations. It is on the hillside east of the River Dulais, close to the Coed Ddu medieval settlement site (GM593).	Prehistoric	GM592
	Mynydd Marchywel Round Cairn	Round cairn	Crynant	51.7286°N 3.7771°W, SN773048	Large circular cairn with central 'robber-crater'. Clear-felling of the trees of Crynant Forest in c. 2009 meant it was visible for the first time in 50 years.	Prehistoric (Bronze Age)	GM531
Pen-y-Castell	Pen-y-Castell	Hillfort	Cwmavon	51.6115°N 3.7509°W, SS788917	Bracken covered knoll with bank and ditch defensive earthworks above the Cwmafan valley.	Prehistoric	GM098
Carreg Bica standing stone	Carreg Bica Standing Stone	Standing stone	Dyffryn Clydach	51.6794°N 3.8457°W, SS724994	A tall stone, 4.3 m high, on a ridge top on Mynydd Drumau, It is west of the Neath valley, close to the Swansea county boundary, where a trackway crosses the ridge. Other names for it are Maen Bredwan and Hoat Stone.	Prehistoric (Bronze Age)	GM382
	Three Round Cairns on Mynydd Drumau	Round cairn	Dyffryn Clydach	51.6796°N 3.8454°W, SS725994	All three are low, degraded mounds, on the ridge-top. One is very close to the Carreg Bica Standing Stone (GM382), the other two being 500 m to the south.	Prehistoric (Bronze Age)	GM383
	Mynydd Drumau Round Cairn with Cist	Round cairn	Dyffryn Clydach, (also Clydach), (see also Swansea)	51.6876°N 3.8465°W, SN724003	Like Carn Lechert (GM078) 7 kilometres (4.3 mi) to the north, this cairn was described by William Camden in 1695. The central cist was excavated in the early 1800s, when 'a heap of bones, and an ancient celt' were found. The trackway that runs beside this monument and the standing stone (GM382) and cairns (GM383) a little way to the south, forms the county border with Swansea.	Prehistoric (Bronze Age)	GM387
	Bachgen Carreg Round Cairn	Round cairn	Glyncorrwg, (also Treherbert), (see also Rhondda Cynon Taf)	51.671°N 3.5804°W, SS908981	Low mound, on a natural hillock, with a small cairn of stones on top.	Prehistoric (Bronze Age)	GM234
	Bryn Llydan Round Barrow	Round barrow	Glyncorrwg	51.6915°N 3.6367°W, SN869004	A round barrow (burial mound) 9 m across, on the summit of a small hill	Prehistoric (Bronze Age)	GM538
Near Carn Caglau	Carn Caglau cairn	Round cairn	Glyncorrwg	51.691°N 3.6497°W, SN860004	Grass covered cairn with a cist chamber depression in the centre. It is on the wide moorland north of Glyncorrwg.	Prehistoric (Bronze Age)	GM577
	Cefn yr Argoed Camp	Enclosure	Glyncorrwg	51.6331°N 3.6887°W, SS832940	Banked enclosure on sloping ground above the steep sides of Cwm yr Argoed valley. The enclosure forms an oval clearing within the Afan Argoed Forest Park, 1 kilometre (0.62 mi) west of a smaller enclosure on the Nant Herbert (GM244). There is an entrance to the south, and a 12 m wide one on the higher NE side, for driving livestock into the enclosure.	Prehistoric (Iron Age)	GM245
	Crug yr Afan Round Cairn	Round cairn	Glyncorrwg, (also Treorchy), (see also Rhondda Cynon Taf)	51.6474°N 3.5618°W, SS920954	A complex mound, with larger earthen base, 28 m across, and a smaller stone cairn on top. This was opened in 1902 when burnt bones and model dagger were found.	Prehistoric (Bronze Age)	GM233
	Nant Herbert Camp	Enclosure	Glyncorrwg	51.6327°N 3.7064°W, SS819940	Circular enclosure 22 m across, on sloping ground above the Nant Herbert Stream, within the Afan Argoed Forest Park. Although it was left as a clearing when the forest was planted, forestry work damaged much of the northern embankments.	Prehistoric (Iron Age)	GM244
Clearing in the trees at the ring cairn	Pebyll Ring Cairn	Ring cairn	Glyncorrwg	51.6634°N 3.5764°W, SS910972	This is a large, oval stoney bank, some 30 metres (98 ft) across, with evidence of kerbstones on the inner and outer faces. A stone cist shows it was used for burials. It is sited on a ridge near the summit of Mynydd Blaengwynfi, close to the border with Rhondda Cynon Taf.	Prehistoric (Bronze Age)	GM330
	Tonmawr Camp	Enclosure	Margam	51.5625°N 3.6882°W, SS830861	Banked enclosure on a headland overlooking the upper reaches of the Afon Cynffig, to the east of Ton Mawr Farm. A bank and ditch enclose an oval 60–70 m across, with a less distinct outer enclosure linked to the inner ring, similar to the nearby Caer Cwmphilip (GM057), 1 km to the NW.	Prehistoric (Iron Age)	GM090
Concentric hillfort defenses at Caer Cwmphilip	Caer Cwmphilip	Enclosure	Margam	51.5695°N 3.6962°W, SS825870	Concentric hillfort enclosure with a subrectangular inner defensive area 70m wide, surrounded by a much larger double banked series of defenses some 200 m across. It occupies a plateau west of Moel Ton Mawr summit, and south of the Nant Cwm Philip valley, with related Iron Age field systems to the east. It is known variously as Caer Cwmphilip and Moel Ton-Mawr.	Prehistoric (Iron Age)	GM057
Oval bank of Danish Camp, by Margam medieval deer park boundary.	Danish Camp	Enclosure	Margam	51.5701°N 3.7027°W, SS820870	Oval bank 33×42 m across. It is within a 20th-century forest plantation, although the area of the camp was left as a clearing. Margam medieval deer park boundary is nearby to the west, and Caer Cwmphilip (GM057) is 500m to the east, and both enclosures are on the same slope aboVe the Cwm Philip stream valley. It is also known as Cwm Philip West Enclosure.	Prehistoric (Iron Age)	GM056
	Ergyd Uchaf Round Barrow	Round cairn	Margam	51.586°N 3.7246°W, SS806888	Round barrow in a small clearing in Margam Forest plantation. It is on a ridge 1.5 km from the summit of Mynydd Margam. There is a substantial central hollow in the mound.	Prehistoric (Bronze Age)	GM159
	Half Moon Camp	Enclosure	Margam	51.5666°N 3.7332°W, SS799867	Small Hillfort on a hilltop north of Margam Abbey, on the opposite side of the valley from Mynydd y Castell (GM162). It is crossed by an upland section of the Wales Coast Path.	Prehistoric (Iron Age)	GM477
Mynydd y Castell Hillfort, in Margam Country Park	Mynydd y Castell Camp	Hillfort	Margam	51.5653°N 3.7237°W, SS806865	Large hillfort enclosing 2.7 hectares (6.7 acres) in a D shape, on an isolated hill 500m east of Margam Abbey. There has been some quarrying, and possible other uses, which may have disrupted layouts of banks and entrances. The hill is the start/finish of three long-distance paths: Ogwr Ridgeway Walk, Coed Morgannwg Way and St Illtyd's Walk.	Prehistoric (Iron Age)	GM162
Pre-Roman double bank, quadrangular enclosure on Mynydd Margam.	Caer Blaen-y-Cwm	Enclosure	Margam	51.579°N 3.6851°W, SS833880	Double bank, defining a quadrangular enclosure 25 m across, on a broad ridge SE of Mynydd Margam, near the source of the River Kenfig. The enclosure was studied by Cyril Fox in 1934, who suggested it was a Roman Camp, and that nearby earthworks could be an outer defense, similar to that at Caer Cwmphilip (GM057), 1.5 km to the SW. However it is now identified as pre-Roman, and the nearby earthworks to be later.	Prehistoric (Iron Age)	GM058
Concrete replica of the Bodvoc Stone in the middle of the cairn	Site of Bodvoc Stone	Ring cairn	Margam	51.5858°N 3.6891°W, SS830887	Site of a 6th-century AD pillar inscribed 'The stone of Bodvoc', set in a Bronze Age cairn on the ridge near Mynydd Margam Summit. The original stone is now in Margam Stones Museum, with a replica at this site.	Prehistoric & Early Medieval	GM443
	Twmpath Diwlith Round Barrow	Round barrow	Margam, (also Maesteg), (see also Bridgend list)	51.5858°N 3.687°W, SS832887	Round barrow excavated in 1921 by Mortimer Wheeler. It was first built of turves, with a cist containing burnt bones. A later burial re-used it, with earth added to the mound. The second interment had been rifled before the excavation.	Prehistoric	GM557
Ty'n-y-Cellar Standing Stone	Ty'n-y-Cellar Standing Stone	Standing stone	Margam	51.5398°N 3.7282°W, SS802837	Large sandstone undressed block, 2.5 metres (8.2 ft) high and 1.4 metres (4.6 ft) across. It is in a field adjoining the M4, but tree growth means it is no longer visible from the motorway. Also called Ty-Du and Ty'n Cellar Standing Stone.	Prehistoric (Bronze Age)	GM179
	Cefn Mawr cairn	Round cairn	Pelenna	51.6741°N 3.6781°W, SS840985	Round cairn sited on a spur at the end of a broad ridge 1 km SW of Cefnmawr summit.	Prehistoric (Bronze Age)	GM581
	Foel Fynyddau Round Cairn	Round cairn	Pelenna and Cwmafan	51.628°N 3.7599°W, SS782935	Cairn of small stones on the summit of Foel Fynyddau, with a trig point set into one side. The summit has been disturbed by nearby copper workings, and has three large communications masts, with assorted huts.	Prehistoric (Bronze Age)	GM279
	Burial Chamber near Carn Llechart	Chambered tomb	Pontardawe	51.7399°N 3.889°W, SN696062	Opinion has swung back and forth on whether this is a natural collection of stone slabs or a Neolithic tomb. One explanation could be that the largest stones, the 'capstone' and a supporting slab, may be in situ, but were utilised to create a tomb, possibly covered by a cairn. The site is on a broad ridge of Mynydd Carnlechert, 60m west of the Carn Lechart burial (GM078), further down the slope, and can be seen from there.	Prehistoric (Neolithic)	GM480
Carn Llechart cairn circle	Carn Llechart Stone Circle	Ring cairn	Pontardawe	51.74°N 3.888°W, SN697062	25 stone slabs, set on edge to form a circle 14 m across, on the skyline of a broad ridge of Mynydd Carnlechert. An open stone-lined cist 2.1 m long is in the centre. It was first noted in 1695 in William Camden's Britannia. It may once have had a mound, but it is more likely it was always a ring cairn, a raised ring with its central area at ground level. It is a burial site, thought to date to 1000-2000BC.	Prehistoric (Bronze Age)	GM078
	Mynydd y Garth Cairn	Round cairn	Pontardawe	51.7529°N 3.8701°W, SN710076	Cairn of loose stones, on the ridge south of Mynedd y Garth summit. It is 12 m across, although some surviving kerb stones are within the current circumference. (A presumed cairnfield on other parts of the mountaintop are now thought to be natural or field clearance stone heaps.)	Prehistoric (Bronze Age)	GM612
	Carn Cornel Round Cairn	Round cairn	Seven Sisters	51.7428°N 3.7152°W, SN816062	Cairn on the shoulder of hillside, west of the Hirfynydd ridge and Sarn Helen Roman road. It occupies what appears to be a natural mound. Close by is a boundary stone, suggesting that the site became a historic boundary mark.	Prehistoric (Bronze Age)	GM275
	Ergyd Isaf Round Barrows	Round cairn	Tai-Bach	51.5838°N 3.7414°W, SS794886	Two circular grass-covered mounds on a hilltop site, with good intervisibility with other burial sites in the area.	Prehistoric (Bronze Age)	GM160
	Blaen-Cwmbach Earthwork	Enclosure	Tonna	51.675°N 3.7463°W, SS793988	An unfinished defensive ringwork on the edge of the scarp, next to the Roman Camp (GM258).	Prehistoric (Iron Age)	GM277
Remains of Nidum Forth south gates	Nidum Roman fort, Neath	Roman Fort	Blaenhonddan	51.6647°N 3.8131°W, SS747977	Auxiliary fort first built in around 74AD, rebuilt in stone and intermittently occupied through to the 3rd century. Much of the site is in the grounds of Dwr-y-Felin Comprehensive School, where a 2011 dig found gate-towers that extended out beyond the wall line, unique in Britain for its time.	Roman	GM215
Cwm Caca, vicinity of the Roman Camp	Melin Court Roman Marching Camp	Roman marching camp	Clyne and Melincourt	51.6871°N 3.684°W, SN836000	Square sided embankments on the upper Melin Court valley, also known as Caen Caca Marching camp. It is next to an Iron Age enclosure (GM366), very like the pairing of the enclosure and Roman camp at Blaen-Cwmbach, 3.7 kilometres (2.3 mi) to the west.	Roman	GM367
	Coelbren Roman Fort	Roman fort	Onllwyn	51.7835°N 3.6548°W, SN859107	Roman auxiliary fort at the northern extremity of Neath Port Talbot, next to the border with Powys. Construction began around 74 AD, with a second construction phase, possibly associated with the laying out of the Sarn Helen road, which heads NE from just outside the fort. Occupation ceased by the mid-2nd century. The fort was first documented in 1907.	Roman	GM146
	Coelbren Roman Marching Camp	Roman marching camp	Onllwyn	51.7796°N 3.6508°W, SN862102	Large rectangular enclosure, 438 metres (1,437 ft) long, defining a Roman marching camp. It is less than 200 metres from Coelbren Roman Fort (GM146), on what is now rough wet land, bounded on three sides by the Camnant and Pyrddin rivers.	Roman	GM343
	Hirfynydd fortlet	Roman signal station	Seven Sisters	51.7466°N 3.6979°W, SN828066	A small square enclosure, 18×19 metres, with rounded corners, high up on the 450 metres (1,480 ft) Hirfynydd ridge between the Neath and Swansea valleys. Situated on the Neath to Brecon Sarn Helen road, which it would have helped control, its other use is thought to have been as a signal station.	Roman	GM274
Looking north along western side of the Blaen Cwm Bach Roman marching camp	Blaen Cwm Bach Camp	Marching camp	Tonna	51.6751°N 3.7394°W, SS798988	Rectangular Roman camp 880 metres (960 yd) from east to west, and 300 metres (330 yd) wide, defined by bank and ditch cut into the rocky ground, on the top of a broad ridge on the hill above Tonna. This is right next to an Iron Age enclosure (GM277), an arrangement repeated 3.7 kilometres (2.3 mi) at Melin Court camp.	Roman	GM258
	Court Herbert Cross & Grave Slab	Cross	Dyffryn Clydach	51.6633°N 3.8219°W, SS740976	A pillar with two crosses carved into it (one 7th to 8th centuries, the other 9th century). A grave slab, reputedly of the first abbot of Neath Abbey, lies nearby. They are now close to the A4230 in Neath, possibly moved to what was then Court Herbert park in the 19th century.	Early Medieval	GM207
	Clawdd Mawr, Mynydd Caerau	Linear earthwork	Glyncorrwg	51.641°N 3.5983°W, SS894947	A bank and ditch running for 200m across a col separating Mynydd Caerau and the Mynyd Llangeinwyr ridge	Early Medieval	GM231
Margam Stones Museum, ground floor	Margam Inscribed & Sculptured Stones	Cross	Margam	51.5637°N 3.7312°W, SS801864	A collection of carved stone pillars and crosses, mostly from the immediate locality, many dating to late Roman and early medieval periods, now housed in the Margam Stones Museum, near Margam Abbey. The stones were collected by the Talbot family during the 18th and 19th centuries. Some of the stones have known source sites which are themselves scheduled. The museum is run by Cadw, and open to the public.	Early Medieval	GM011
	Sculptured Cross Llanmihangel Farm	Cross	Margam	51.532°N 3.7082°W, SS816828	Fragment of a Celtic 'cartwheel cross' head, now built into a wall east of Llanmihangel farmhouse. It may have originated from the nearby St Michael's Grange.	Early Medieval	GM345
	Cefn Morfydd Dyke & Earthwork	Linear earthwork	Tonna	51.668°N 3.7533°W, SS788980	This bank with shallow ditch runs across the ridge of Cefn Morfydd, disrupted at its east end by an industrial tramway.	Early Medieval	GM264
Plas Baglan fortified enclosure is probably amongst the trees beyond the clearing.	Plas Baglan	Castle	Baglan	51.6157°N 3.7979°W, SS756922	12th-century defensive house overlooking Baglan, occupied until the 17th century. Only a platform and traces of masonry remain.	Medieval	GM358
Ruined medieval church of St Baglan, Port Talbot	St Baglan's Church	Church	Baglan	51.6156°N 3.8016°W, SS753922	Medieval Church, now in the overgrown corner of the large churchyard. It appears to be a pre-Norman foundation, with two early Christian stones in the churchyard. It was replaced by a newer church in the same churchyard in 1882, but only became derelict after a fire in 1954.	Medieval	GM428
	St Margaret's Chapel	Church	Coedffranc	51.6297°N 3.8723°W, SS705939	First recorded in 1291, this was a chapel of St Margaret's Grange, an outlier of Neath Abbey. The site, near Jersey Marine, was excavated in 1931.	Medieval	GM362
	Hirfynydd house platforms.	House platform	Crynant	51.743°N 3.7306°W, SN806063	On the edge of a plateau of the Hirfynydd ridge, beside the steep slopes of the Dulais valley, the banked rectangular enclosure has a house platform in the west corner. Two further platforms are west of the enclosure. Also called Coed Ddu and Nant-y-Cafn enclosure.	Medieval	GM593
	Tirlan medieval house sites	Platform house	Crynant	51.709°N 3.7922°W, SN762026	Two platform houses 120 m apart, beside a track on the south-east flank of Mynnydd Marchywel, near Tyrlan. Cultivation ridges are in the vicinity. Also described as Platform Houses 1600m SE of Blaen-Nant Farm	Medieval	GM326
	Castell Bowlan	Motte	Cwmavon	51.6135°N 3.781°W, SS767920	Also called Cwm-Clais, it may be a 12th-century Welsh castle, built in imitation of Norman mottes. Edward Lhuyd in the 17th century recorded a group of three castles, "Castel y Wiryones", "y Castell" and "Ben y Castell", which may refer to this, along with Plas Baglan (GM358) and Pen-y-Castell (GM098). It may be the castle belonging to Morgan Gam where Herbert Fitzmatthew was killed.	Medieval	GM289
	Mynydd Drumau settlement platforms	House platform	Dyffryn Clydach	51.687°N 3.8417°W, SN727002	A group of house platforms, cut into the steep hillside below the summit of Mynydd Drumau.	Medieval	GM549
Neath Abbey and the Tennant Canal	Neath Abbey and Gatehouse	Abbey	Dyffryn Clydach	51.6612°N 3.826°W, SS738974	Cistercian monastery, once the largest abbey in Wales. Following its dissolution, the Herbert Mansion was built on the Abbot's lodging, and the area then became an industrial site. The substantial ruins were excavated in 1924 and 1934, and taken into public ownership in 1944. It is now in the care of Cadw and open to the public. The 12th-century gatehouse is north of the New Road.	Medieval (12th century)	GM006
Hen Eglwys, a ruined chapel above Margam Park	Hen Eglwys	Chapel	Margam	51.5648°N 3.7308°W, SS801865	Also known as Cryke Chapel and dated to 1470, this grange of nearby Margam Abbey (GM005) is on the hillside of Craig-y-capel. The gable-ends, with window tracery are the principle survivals, and provided a gothic landmark and viewpoint for the 19th-century parkland of Margam Castle. There was a burial ground and a holy well known as Ffynnon Mair.	Medieval (1470)	GM163
Margam Abbey with Margam Castle in the background	Margam Abbey	Abbey	Margam	51.5623°N 3.7298°W, SS801862	Founded in 1147, St Mary's Abbey was dissolved in 1536. The nave survives as Margam parish church. The remainder of the abbey complex was acquired by the Mansel, and later the Talbot family, who incorporated the ruins into their parkland and Margam Castle. A 12-sided chapter house has been restored. The outer precincts may have occupied a much larger area than the currently defined inner core area.	Medieval (1147)	GM005
	Margam Medieval Bath House	Bath-house	Margam	51.5684°N 3.7284°W, SS803869	Also known as Ffynnon Fyggyr (medicinal well) this may be a healing well, though also used for baptisms by Hen Eglwys (GM163) and later as a Monastic baths for Margam Abbey (GM005). The present structure, 14th or 15th century but probably on an older site, has a stone vaulted roof over a 1m deep pool with original flagstones.	Medieval	GM545
Neath Castle	Neath Castle	Castle	Neath	51.6651°N 3.8035°W, SS753977	Neath's second castle, this is first documented in 1183. (A castle of 1120 was located across the river near the Roman Fort - GM215) Destroyed in 1321 and rebuilt in 1377, this one was in use until the 17th century, and has been a recreational area for the town since the 18th century.	Medieval	GM039
House Platforms on the north slope of Foel Fynyddau	Foel Fynyddau Deserted Rural Settlement	House platform	Pelenna	51.6351°N 3.7595°W, SS783943	800m North of the summit of Foel Fynyddau two sets of earthwork house platforms and a sunken storehouse mark the location of a medieval settlement	Medieval	GM551
The 'blowing house' of Venallt Blast Furnace	Remains of Venallt Ironworks	Ironworks	Blaengwrach	51.7319°N 3.6459°W, SN864049	Blast furnaces on the western edge of Cwmgwrach, built in 1839–42 to use anthracite-fired 'hot-blast' method of iron smelting. Also called Yr Wenallt.	Post-Medieval/ Modern	GM423
Tennant Canal Aqueduct over the River Neath at Aberdulais	Aberdulais Aqueduct	Aqueduct	Blaenhonddan	51.679°N 3.7762°W, SS772992	Built in 1823 to cross the River Neath and link the Tennant and Neath Canals. With 10 stone arches it is the longest aqueduct in South Wales.	Post-Medieval/ Modern	GM506
Waterwheel and industrial remains, Aberdulais Falls	Tinplate works at Aberdulais Falls NT	Tinplate Works	Blaenhonddan	51.6807°N 3.7779°W, SS771994	Industrial site originating with waterpowered metalworking in 1584. Now open to the public	Post-Medieval/ Modern	GM485
Bridge on the Ynysmaerdy Railway Incline	Ynysmaerdy Railway Incline	Railway	Briton Ferry	51.6401°N 3.8061°W, SS751950	Inclined plane railway, designed in the 1850s by Brunel to bring coal to Briton Ferry Docks, and abandoned in 1910	Post-Medieval/ Modern (1850s)	GM489
	Waun y Coed Colliery Branch Canal and Tramroad Incline	Industrial monument	Cilybebyll	51.7285°N 3.8292°W, SN737048	Complex arrangement of tramway, canal branch, and canal dock, to link the Waun y Coed Colliery and nearby Ynyscedwyn Ironworks with the canal to Swansea. This required a tramway bridge over the River Tawe, now gone, and wharves and 300 m of canal, now filled in, that linked to the Swansea Canal. Several buildings and foundations of numerous structures remain.	Post-Medieval/ Modern (1828)	GM400
	Tennant Canal: Skewen Cutting and tramroad bridge	Canal	Coedffranc	51.6583°N 3.8346°W, SS731970	A stone lined section of the Tennant Canal where it runs through the Skewen Cutting, in Neath. Built by William Kirkhouse in 1821, the canal linked the Neath Valley to Swansea docks. The stone lining was to counteract a problem with quicksand. The bridge carried a pre-existing horse-drawn railway, at a time when Britain was the only country in the world with surface railways.	Post-Medieval/ Modern (1821)	GM394
	Cwmafan copper works flue	Chimney	Cwmavon	51.6254°N 3.7592°W, SS783933	Culvert running up the hillside to a former stack on the summit of Foel Fynyddau. The flue vented fumes from copper smelting works, which were in use from 1838 to 1906. The stack was demolished in 1940 in case Luftwaffe bombers used it for navigation. Further damage occurred when a communication mast was built.	Post-Medieval/ Modern (1838)	GM566
Neath Abbey Ironworks blast furnaces	Neath Abbey Ironworks	Industrial monument	Dyffryn Clydach	51.6644°N 3.8268°W, SS737977	Two blast furnaces and engineering works, with a forge and rolling mill upstream. It was in use from the 1790s to 1885. They were acquired by the Fox and later Price families, who expanded to other sites in the Neath valley. Steam Engine manufacture was an early specialism and shipbuilding were amongst the items produced. Their Quaker principles meant they were against any production of armaments.	Post-Medieval/ Modern (1790s)	GM389
Machinery at Cwm Clydach pond	Neath Abbey Ironworks Dam	Dam	Dyffryn Clydach	51.6735°N 3.8248°W, SS739987	Dam on the river Clydach, to provide a constant water supply for the ironworks waterwheel. Built in 1840.	Post-Medieval/ Modern (1840)	GM395
	Ynys Fawr Corn-Drying Kiln	Corn-drying kiln	Glyncorrwg	51.6403°N 3.722°W, SS809948	An inverted dry stone walled cone, set in the ground, provided a 3-metre-wide space over which skins could be stretched, and grain spread out. A connecting tunnel allowed a fire to warm the air under the grain, and dry it out ready for storage.	Post-Medieval/ Modern	GM546
	Leat & Dam at Llanmihangel Mill	Leat	Margam, (also Cornelly), (see also Bridgend)	51.5282°N 3.7012°W, SS820824	A three-storey watermill, with pit wheel, machinery and stones largely intact, having ceased use in 1940. The dam and leat bring water from the nearby River Cynfig. The site was recorded as a mill in 1291, but the remains are from the early 19th century.	Post-Medieval/ Modern (19th century)	GM449
	Remains of Blast Furnaces at Banwen	Blast Furnace	Onllwyn	51.7811°N 3.6425°W, SN867104	The most intact of the ironworks on the anthracite coalfield. Built in 1845, and connected to the Swansea Canal by an edge rail wagonway, it may have produced no more than 80 tons of pig iron. Blast furnaces, charging platform, weighbridge and enginehouse all remain after its short-lived operation.	Post-Medieval/ Modern	GM420
	Cwm Pelenna Colliery Ventilation Furnace	Industrial monument	Pelenna	51.6612°N 3.7119°W, SS816972	Stone chimney and hillside flue, used to ventilate the coal mine in the 1830s. It was re-used in the mid-20th century, with a fan system.	Post-Medieval/ Modern	GM458
Aqueduct (now cycleway) over the valley at Pontrhydyfen	Pontrhydyfen Aqueduct / Viaduct	Aqueduct	Pelenna	51.633°N 3.7415°W, SS795941	Completed in 1825 to provide a wagonway across the Afan valley, it is a 425 yards (389 m) bridge with four huge arches, and is also known as 'Y Bont Fawr' (The Big Bridge). It had a substantial trough to carry water across the valley to power the waterwheels of Cwmafon steelworks. It is now a cycle and pedestrian routeway. (A second viaduct crosses the river Afan to the west, taking a railway up Cwm Pelenna.)	Post-Medieval/ Modern (1825)	GM393
	Melin Court Blast Furnace	Blast Furnace	Resolven	51.7027°N 3.7022°W, SN824018	Operating between 1708 and 1808 this is an early and significant ironworks, standing on precipitous cliffs above the Melincourt brook. Also known as Melincwrt Ironworks, it had furnace, foundry and a wide range of ancillary buildings, now standing in ruins among woodland.	Post-Medieval/ Modern (1708)	GM416
	Claypon's Tramroad at Ystradgynlais	Tramroad	Seven Sisters, (also Ystradgynlais and Tawe-Uchaf, see Powys)	51.7734°N 3.7218°W, SN812097	Early tramroad, bringing coal from Drim Colliery and limestone (needed as a flux) from the quarries of Mynydd y Drum to the Ynyscedwyn Ironworks in the Swansea Valley. Built by Joseph Claypon in 1832 and in use until 1867, the tramroad linked with the Brecon Forest Tramroad, and parts were later incorporated into the Swansea Vale Railway.	Post-Medieval/ Modern (1832)	GM399
The remains of 'Parson's Folly' Tramroad	Parsons' Folly (Glyncorrwg Mineral Railway)	Railway	Tonna	51.6691°N 3.7514°W, SS789981	12 km wagonway, with steep inclines to haul coal trucks over the hills from the Blaencregan colliery to the canals of the Neath valley. The construction and operating costs proved unfeasable and both Mr Parsons and his successor were bankrupted by the enterprise. Built between 1839 and 1842 with massive inclines and a steam-powered winding house, it was abandoned in 1852. The scheduled section is on the west side of Cefn Morfudd.	Post-Medieval/ Modern	GM447
	Remains of Lock and Dry Dock at Pantyffynnon	Lock	Ystalyfera	51.7513°N 3.8003°W, SN758073	At Lock 17 (or 'sawmill lock') of the Swansea Canal, a dry dock was installed in 1875–6, shortly after the canal was sold to the Great Western Railway. The dry dock was alongside the normal lock, and enabled boats to be floated into place and rested on timber supports, so that the hull could be worked on after the water was emptied. Close by was the quay for Crimea Colliery (GM453)	Post-Medieval/ Modern (1875)	GM397
	Briton Ferry Dock Entrance	Dockyard	Briton Ferry	51.627°N 3.8269°W, SS736936	Designed by Brunel in 1861, this had an experimental buoyant lockgate system between the tidal and inner docks in the Neath Estuary.	Post-Medieval/ Modern (1861)	GM445
	Cae'r Mynydd Ventilation Furnace and Mine	Colliery	Bryn	51.6204°N 3.6944°W, SS827926	Dated to early 19th century, before the development of powered fans for ventilation. A brazier within the furnace building created an updraft which sucked old air out of the mine, to be replaced by fresh air via other entrances. This furnace ventilated a drift mine. It is a well-preserved example of early mine ventilation technology.	Post-Medieval/ Modern	GM547
Skew bridge at Aberdulais canal basin	Canal Boat at Aberdulais Basin	Canal Boat	Tonna	51.6794°N 3.7752°W, SS773993	Aberdulais basin is the point where the Neath and Tennant canals meet. Several old canal boats were abandoned beside the canal basin, and have now all but disappeared into the banks. The location of one, on the west bank of the Tennant canal, is a scheduled site.	Post-Medieval/ Modern	GM505
Swansea Canal Aqueduct at Ystalyfera	River Twrch Aqueduct, Ystalyfera	Aqueduct	Ystalyfera, (also Ystradgynlais), (see also Powys)	51.7684°N 3.7799°W, SN772092	Stone aqueduct built over a weir, carrying the Swansea Canal over the River Twrch. Its three massive arches make it the largest of the five aqueducts on the canal. Built in 1798 by Thomas Sheasby, it was innovative in using Hydraulic cement to line the trough instead of puddled clay. Its proximity to the Capitol Cinema gave it the local name of 'Capitol Bridge'. It was restored in 1995 but is not currently water-filled, the canal route on either side being dry.	Post-Medieval/ Modern (1798)	GM396
	Crimea Colliery & Canal Quay	Coal mine	Ystalyfera	51.7504°N 3.8019°W, SN757072	The Crimea coalmine only operated for 8 years, from 1854 to 1862, and the site has been abandoned ever since. Amongst the regenerating woodland are the substantial ruins of a beam-engine pumping-house, a winding house and chimney, and a complete surface layout of a mid-19th-century colliery. A short tramroad led to a quay on the Swansea Canal, 200m south of the dry dock (GM397).	Post-Medieval/ Modern (1854)	GM453
	Cilybebyll Auxiliary Unit Operational Base	Observation Post	Cilybebyll	51.723°N 3.8101°W, SN750042	Underground chamber in woodland, with a concrete floor, brick walls and corrugated iron roof. Built to be a concealed base for defense in the event of invasion.	Post-Medieval/ Modern (1940s)	GM620
Pentreclwydau coalmine, Glynneath, a mid 20th century drift mine	Pentreclwydau Colliery	Coal mine	Glynneath	51.733°N 3.669°W, SN848051	Anthracite coalmine opened by the nationalised British Coal Board in 1957, and worked out 10 years later. It was a drift mine, driven sideways into the hillside south of Glynneath.	Post-Medieval/ Modern (1957)	GM537
Coast Defence Radar Station overlooking Swansea Bay	Chain Home Low Radar Station, Margam	Radar station	Margam	51.5698°N 3.7428°W, SS793871	One of a network of early warning radar stations around the coast of Britain, constructed from 1941 to look for German bombers and shipping during World War II. They complemented the earlier Chain Home stations by being able to detect low-flying planes. The Margam station has three flat-topped buildings within the Country Park, high on the escarpment, overlooking Port Talbot and Swansea Bay.	Post-Medieval/ Modern (1940s)	GM488

== See also ==
- List of Cadw properties
- List of castles in Wales
- List of hill forts in Wales
- Historic houses in Wales
- List of monastic houses in Wales
- List of museums in Wales
- List of Roman villas in Wales
- Grade I listed buildings in Neath Port Talbot
- Grade II* listed buildings in Neath Port Talbot
