= Registered historic parks and gardens in Neath Port Talbot =

List of buildings in county borough of Wales

Neath Port Talbot shown within Wales

Neath Port Talbot is a county borough in South Wales. It covers an area of 441 km^{2} (170 sq mi) and in 2021 the population was approximately 141,900.

The Cadw/ICOMOS Register of Parks and Gardens of Special Historic Interest in Wales was established in 2002 and given statutory status in 2022. It is administered by Cadw, the historic environment agency of the Welsh Government. Elisabeth Whittle described Cadw as having a "somewhat special and guiding role" in the preservation of historic parks and gardens, since they are "an integral part of Welsh archaeological and architectural heritage". The register includes just under 400 sites, ranging from gardens of private houses, to cemeteries and public parks. Parks and gardens are listed at one of three grades, matching the grading system used for listed buildings. Grade I is the highest grade, for sites of exceptional interest; Grade II*, the next highest, denotes parks and gardens of great quality; while Grade II denotes sites of special interest.

There are six registered parks and gardens in Neath Port Talbot. One is listed at Grade I, one at Grade II*, and four at Grade II.

== Key ==
Grade	Criteria
I	Parks and gardens of exceptional interest
II*	Parks and gardens of great quality
II	Parks and gardens of special interest

== List of parks and gardens ==
List of parks and gardens
Name	Location Grid Ref. (Note: Sometimes known as OSGB36, the grid reference is based on the British national grid reference system used by the Ordnance Survey.) Geo-coordinates	Date Listed	Description / Notes	Grade	Reference Number	Image
The Gnoll	Tonna; SS7674297632; 51°39′49″N 3°46′56″W	1 February 2022	Park, country house garden and kitchen garden The Gnoll, a house built in the 1770s and demolished in 1957, was located on a prominent, steep-sided hill. The garden and pleasure grounds lie on the hill with the former kitchen gardens lying to the east of the pleasure grounds. The eighteenth-century park was landscaped in several phases and its features include a cascade and several follies.	II*	PGW(Gm)50(NEP)	a cascade waterfall with paths on either side
Jersey Park	Briton Ferry; SS7446394881; 51°38′18″N 3°48′51″W	1 February 2022	Public park The park opened in 1925 on land that the Earl of Jersey had given for use as a public park in 1908. The original layout of formal and informal areas has been retained. There are sporting facilities in the northern part of the park with woodland areas to the south.	II	PGW(Gm)62(NEP)	a park, with houses in the distance
Margam Park	Margam; SS8092886218; 51°33′42″N 3°43′05″W	1 February 2022	Parks and kitchen garden This site, which is of "outstanding historical importance", has a walled deer park, pleasure grounds and gardens, and is the product of many phases of development from the Tudor era to the 1950s. Within the grounds are numerous scheduled monuments and listed buildings, including a hydroelectric turbine house (built in 1891), a Georgian orangery, the remains of a Cistercian abbey and a prehistoric hillfort.	I	PGW(Gm)52(NEP)	a stone terrace with pools and flower beds in front of a stone-built orangery
Rheola	Glynneath; SN8393904408; 51°43′33″N 3°40′50″W	1 February 2022	Park, country house garden and kitchen garden The small park and informal gardens provide a picturesque setting for the grade II* listed house which was built c. 1812–1818 by John Nash for his cousin John Edwards. The kitchen garden, which lies to its south-west, probably dates to the same time as the house.	II	PGW(Gm)53(NEP)	a white house in front of wooded hillside
Talbot Memorial Park, Port Talbot	Port Talbot; SS7724589187; 51°35′16″N 3°46′20″W	1 February 2022	Public park In 1918 Emily Charlotte Talbot (1840–1918) donated a field for use as a memorial to the dead of the first world war. The focal point of the park, which opened in 1926, is the grade II* listed war memorial by Louis Frederick Roslyn. The main gate, entrance lodges, drinking fountain and bandstand are grade II listed.	II	PGW(Gm)45(NEP)	a blue and white octagonal bandstand in a park
Victoria Gardens	Neath; SS7535397439; 51°39′41″N 3°48′08″W	1 February 2022	Public park In 1898, the Corporation Field, a piece of land bought from the Gnoll estate in 1856, was renamed the Victoria Gardens having been laid out the previous year by a local builder, Thomas John Snow. At the centre of the park is a bandstand around which are paths, lawns and flower beds. In the south-east quadrant of the park there is a Gorsedd circle.	II	PGW(Gm)64(NEP)	a stone circle in a park. In the background are trees, a bandstand and a church tower

== See also ==
- List of scheduled monuments in Neath Port Talbot
- Grade I listed buildings in Neath Port Talbot
- Grade II* listed buildings in Neath Port Talbot
