= Buarth-y-Gaer =

Archaeological site in Wales

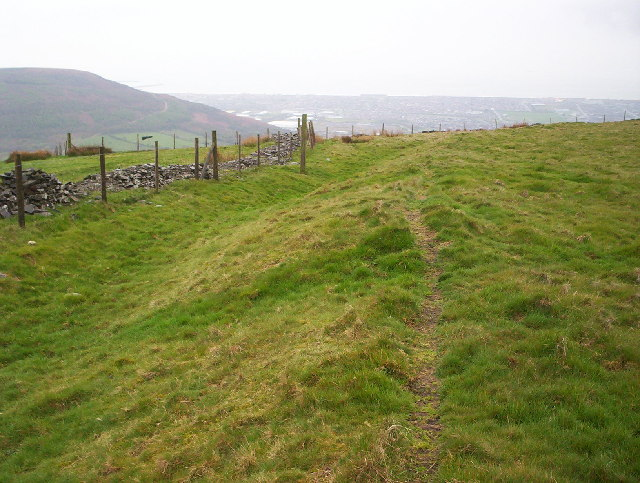
- Ramparts of Buarth-y-Gaer, along southeast side.

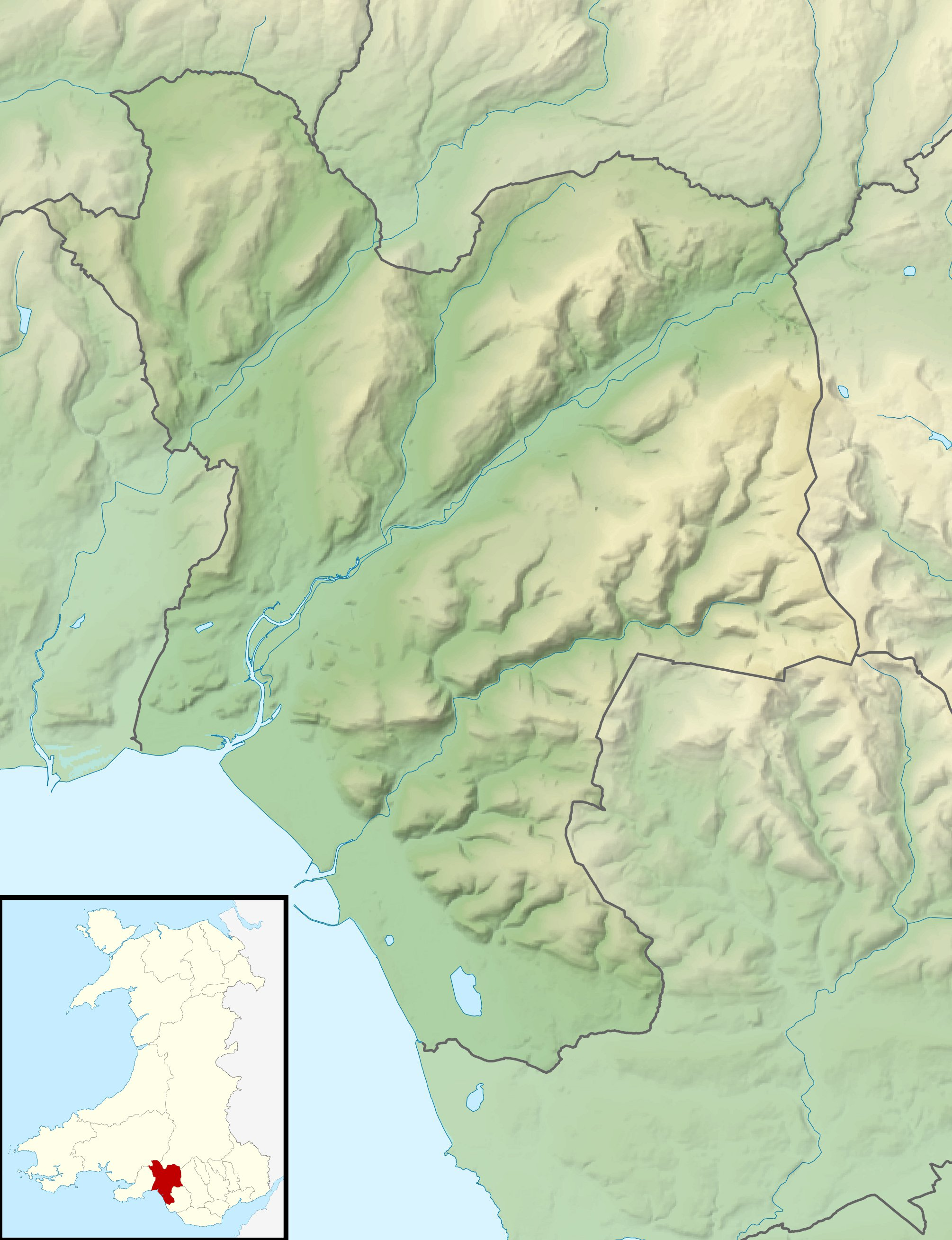
- Buarth-y-Gaer, within Briton Ferry Community, Neath Port Talbot
- 51.6276°N 3.7849°W
- Type: Hillfort
- Periods: Iron Age
- Cultures: Celtic Brittonic
- Location: summit of Mynydd-y-Gaer, Neath Port Talbot, Wales (OS Grid ref SS765939)
- Region: South Wales

Site notes
- Area: 1.1 ha (2.7 acres)
- Condition: A single bank and ditch, damaged by quarrying on south side.
- Public access: No

Scheduled monument
- Reference no.: GM054

Buarth-y-Gaer (pronounced [ˈbɪ.arθ ə ɡɑːɨr]) is an Iron Age hillfort or enclosure on the summit of Mynydd-y-Gaer, 300 m (980 ft) above sea level. It is in Briton Ferry community, near Neath, in Neath Port Talbot, South Wales. A large hilltop enclosure is bounded by a single bank and ditch. Within the enclosed area is a Bronze Age burial mound.

== Location ==
The hillfort is on the highest point of Mynydd-y-Gaer. It is one of three hillforts on this broad upland ridge; Craig Ty-Isaf is a much smaller hillfort to the south-west, close to Baglan, whilst Gaer Fawr is 800 m (870 yd) to the north. Mynydd-y-Gaer has a rounded hilltop, with grassland fields and stone walls running up to Buarth-y-Gaer. The hill stands above the Neath estuary and Briton Ferry, on the other side of Briton Ferry Woods, some 3 km (1.9 miles) to the north-west. The village of Baglan is at the foot of the hill, 1 km (0.62 miles) to the south-west. A slightly higher mountain, Foel Fynyddau lies to the east. Although the hillfort lies within Briton Ferry community, the south and east banks of the fort are on the boundary with Baglan community.

== Earthworks ==
The fort is defined by a single bank and ditch which are roughly circular. It is 130 m (140 yd) across and encloses 1.1 ha (2.7 acres) of rough grassland. Small-scale early quarrying has removed some of the bank from the south side. The remainder has several modern gaps and an original entrance on the west side. The bank stands half a metre above the interior, with a 2 m (6.6 ft) drop from the bank to the bottom of the ditch. The site is a scheduled monument. Although the hill name is 'Mynydd-y-Gaer' (Mountain of the Fort) and the scheduling classifies it as a hillfort, the site shows little evidence of defensibility or fortification, and may be better termed an enclosure or 'defended enclosure'.

A Bronze Age burial mound, which pre-dates the hillfort, stands within the enclosed area as the only internal feature. This is 0.8 m high, and 11.6 m (38 ft) across.

== See also ==
- List of Scheduled Monuments in Neath Port Talbot
