= Mynydd-y-Gaer =

Hill in Wales

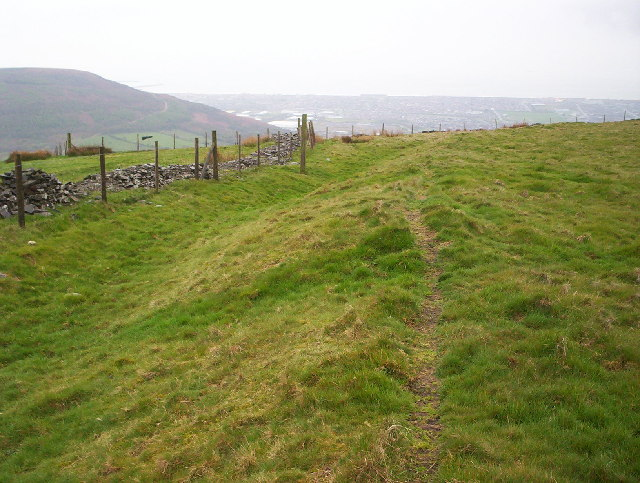
- Iron age hillfort west of the summit of Mynydd-y-Gaer

Highest point
- Elevation: 314 m (1,030 ft)
- Prominence: 80 m
- Parent peak: Foel Fynyddau
- Listing: Tumps
- Coordinates: 51°37′39″N 3°46′58″W

Naming
- English translation: hill of the fort
- Language of name: Welsh

Geography
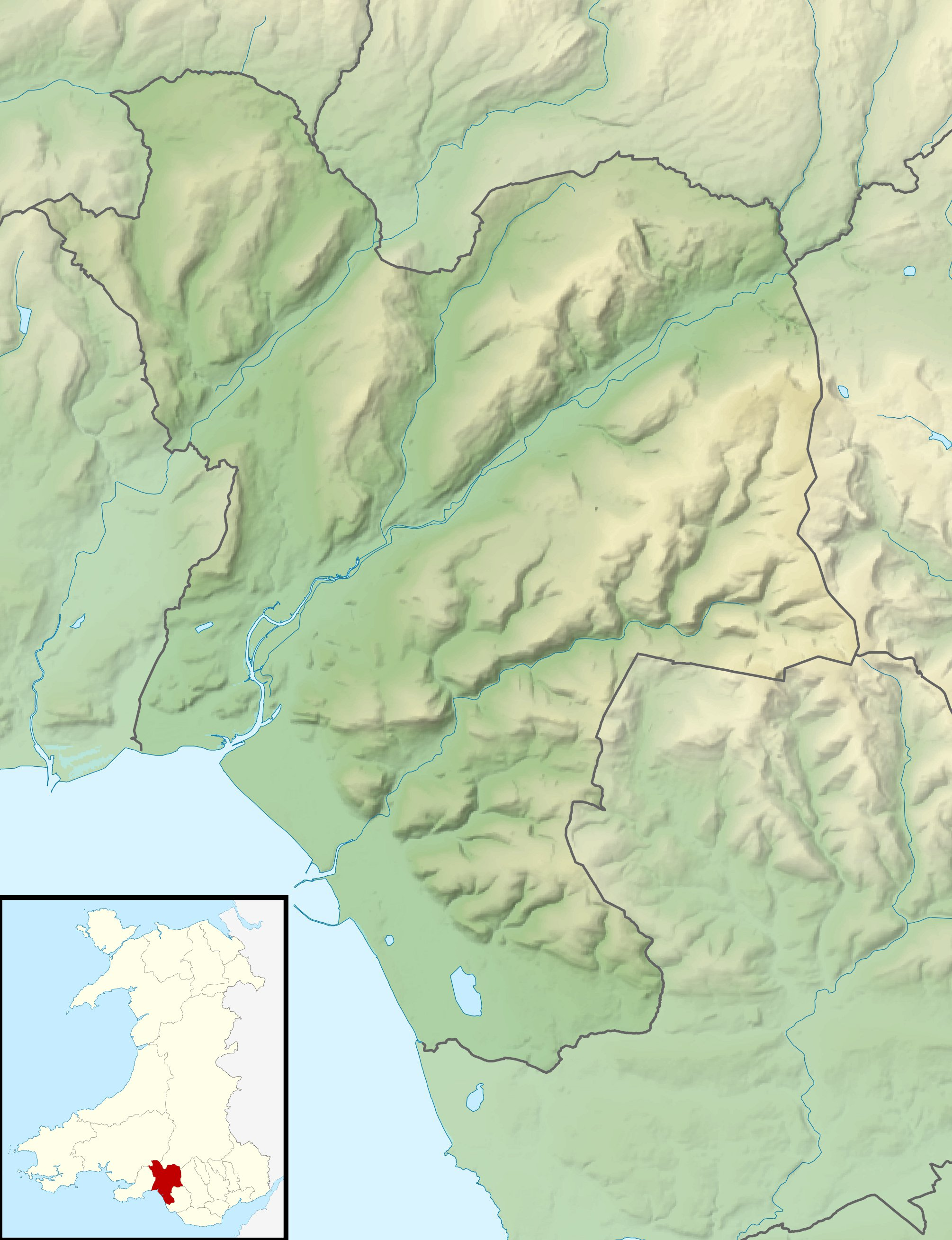
- Location within Neath Port Talbot
- Location: Neath Port Talbot, Wales
- OS grid: SS767936
- Topo map: OS Landranger 170 / Explorer 165

Mynydd-y-Gaer is a hill that sits on the boundaries between the South Wales communities of Baglan (south-western quarter), Cwmavon (south-eastern quarter) and Briton Ferry, (northern half), all within Neath Port Talbot county borough. The summit, at 314 m (1,030 ft), has grassland fields subdivided by dry stone walls. Foel Fynyddau lies 2 km to east. To the south is the coastal plain of the Bristol Channel. To the West is the Vale of Neath. To the north is the Crythan Brook and the town of Neath. It has numerous prehistoric monuments, and evidence of occupation in medieval times, as well as 19th and 20th century coalmining.

== Prehistory ==
Three scheduled monuments are on the hill, all dating to the Iron Age. Close to the summit is the hillfort enclosure of Buarth-y-Gaer. On the south-west flank, close to Baglan, is a small hillfort, Craig Ty-Isaf. A third hillfort, Gaer Fawr is 800 m (870 yd) from the summit, on the northern spur.

Bronze Age burial cairns are also recorded. One, near the summit, is within the enclosure at Buarth-y-Gaer. Similarly the enclosure at Gaer Fawr has a group of 5 cairns, which may once have been as many as 19, but the rest appear to be ploughed away. Another cairn is located on the crest of the ridge, part way between the two enclosures.

== Medieval occupation ==
There are records of a deserted medieval village having been located on Mynnydd-y-Gaer, although the location is uncertain. A house platform has been identified on the east side of the hill. The only high-level road over the hill is a minor road that runs north-south over the saddle between Mynydd-y-Gaer and Foel Fynyddau, close by the house platform, and also past a number of disused coalmining levels, in the vicinity of Gelligaer Fach Farm, and probably dating at least to the 19th century.

== Coal mining ==
Although no coalmining currently takes place on the hill, two collieries were located there in the first half of the twentieth century. The numerous earlier levels had accessed the coal from levels on the east side of the hill. At a much larger scale the Cwm Mawr colliery, based further south in Cwmafon, opened up a No 3 slant around 1920, running into the side of Mynydd-y-Gaer. From 1922 it was owned by Briton Ferry Collieries Ltd, who employed upwards of 100 men at the Cwm Mawr mines for the next 20 years. It closed in 1944, with a short-lived re-opening in 1950.

On the northern tip of the Mynydd-y-Gaer ridge was the Eskyn Colliery. This was established early in the 20th century, and constructed a leat, engine house, tramroad and spoil tips, all of which remain. However it was of short duration, and was listed as disused in 1919.

== Access ==
No footpaths run to the summit of the hill. On the eastern side a minor road crosses the high saddle 80m below the summit. A section of the Forestry Commission's Margam Forest may allow access to its rides. On the western side are the Briton Ferry Woods, a mixed woodland including plantations and broadleaved trees, occupying a large area of the slopes and ridges on that side of the hill, and with many paths and rides. The Wales Coast Path has an inland section that runs along the south-western rim of these woods.

In 1861 the Ynysmaerdy Railway Incline was opened along the northern edge of the hill, to transport coal down to Briton Ferry docks. The line closed in 1910.

== See also ==
- List of Scheduled Monuments in Neath Port Talbot
- Buarth-y-Gaer
