= Joseph John Richards =

Composer, conductor, and music educator

Joseph John Richards (August 27, 1878 – March 16, 1956) was a composer, conductor, and music educator best known for writing over 300 compositions for circus and school bands. His most successful works were marches, including Crusade for Freedom, Emblem of Unity, and Shield of Liberty.

Richards was born in Cwmafan, Wales, but spent most of his childhood in Pittsburg, Kansas, United States. He began playing alto horn and cornet at the age of ten and became director of the Norton-Jones Circus Band at the age of nineteen. He would later play for and conduct several other circus bands, including the Barnum and Bailey Circus Band and the Ringling Brothers Band before they combined. When not playing for a circus, Richards studied music at Kansas State Teachers College and the American Conservatory of Music.

He began teaching music during World War I, first to Army bands and later to public schoolchildren. He conducted several municipal bands in Florida and Kansas until 1945 when he was selected to succeed Herbert L. Clarke as conductor of the Long Beach, California Municipal Band. He became a member of the American Bandmasters Association in 1936 and was elected president in 1949.

Richards died in Long Beach, California in 1956. He was inducted into the Windjammers' Hall of Fame in 1981.
