= Ivor Thomas (trade unionist) =

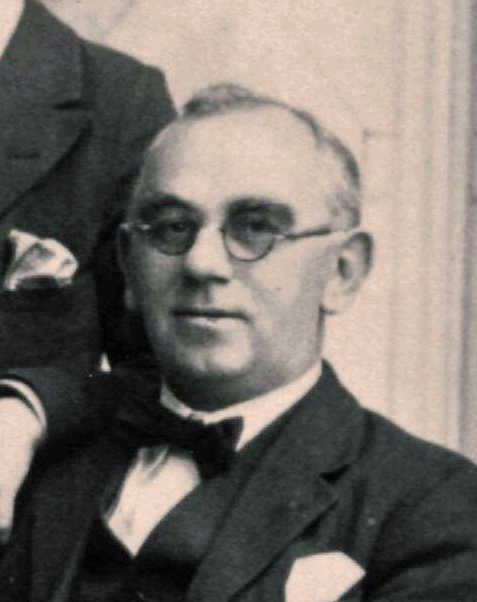
Ivor Thomas in 1930

Ivor Hael Thomas (1875 – 21 March 1963) was a British trade unionist and socialist activist.

Born in Briton Ferry, Thomas worked in the office of a tinplate works from the age of fifteen, then became a tinplate finisher. He joined the Dock, Wharf, Riverside and General Labourers' Union, and served on its executive from 1914 until 1916. He was a member of the Independent Labour Party (ILP) for many years, and served on its National Administrative Committee, representing the Wales Division, from 1914 until 1920. About one in twenty residents of the town were members of the Briton Ferry ILP, and this has been credited largely to Thomas' enthusiasm. Like the majority of the ILP, he opposed the war, and was personally prominent in the No Conscription Fellowship. He arranged anti-war speakers from across the UK to visit Briton Ferry, with at least twenty anti-war meetings each year from 1916 until 1918.

In 1916, Thomas became the first Welsh organiser of the National Council for Civil Liberties (NCCL), although he was keen to stress that the NCCL as a whole did not oppose the war. After the war, he became the first secretary of its Aberavon Constituency Labour Party, and began working full-time as an official of the Transport and General Workers' Union.

Party political offices
Preceded by John Watt	Wales Division representative on the National Administrative Council of the Independent Labour Party; 1914–1920	Succeeded by John Barr
