= Rees Richards =

Wales dual-code international rugby footballer

Personal information
- Full name: Rees Richards
- Born: 1886 Cwmavon, Neath Port Talbot, Wales
- Died: unknown

Playing information

Rugby union
- Position: Forwards
Club
Years	Team	Pld	T	G	FG	P
	Cymmer RFC
	Aberavon RFC					21
	Total	0	0	0	0	21
Representative
Years	Team	Pld	T	G	FG	P
1913	Wales	3	0	0	0	0

Rugby league
- Position: Forward
Club
Years	Team	Pld	T	G	FG	P
1913–15	Wigan	53	7			21
Representative
Years	Team	Pld	T	G	FG	P
1914	Wales	1

Rees Richards (1886 – death unknown) was a Welsh dual-code international rugby union, and professional rugby league footballer who played in the 1910s. He played representative level rugby union (RU) for Wales, and at club level for Aberavon RFC, as a forward, and representative level rugby league (RL) for Wales, and at club level for Wigan, as a forward.

== Background ==
Rees Richards was born in Cwmafan, Wales.

== International honours ==
Richards won caps for Wales (RU) while at Aberavon RFC in 1913 against Scotland, France, and Ireland, and won a cap for Wales (RL) while at Wigan in 1914.
