= Grade I listed buildings in Neath Port Talbot =

Neath Port Talbot shown within Wales

In the United Kingdom, the term listed building refers to a building or other structure officially designated as being of special architectural, historical, or cultural significance; Grade I structures are those considered to be "buildings of exceptional interest". Listing was begun by a provision in the Town and Country Planning Act 1947. Once listed, strict limitations are imposed on the modifications allowed to a building's structure or fittings. In Wales, the authority for listing under the Planning (Listed Buildings and Conservation Areas) Act 1990 rests with Cadw.

== Buildings ==
Name	Location Grid Ref. (Note: Sometimes known as OSGB36, the grid reference is based on the British national grid reference system used by the Ordnance Survey.) Geo-coordinates	Date Listed	Function	Notes	Reference Number	Image
Margam Abbey (St Mary's Abbey Church)	Margam; SS8015286291; 51°33′46″N 3°43′49″W	12 November 1952	Church	Located at the end of a short lane which runs NE off the A48. The Stones Museum is within the churchyard. The S doorway faces into Margam Park.	14148	See more images
Margam Abbey Chapter House	Margam; SS8019786264; 51°33′45″N 3°43′47″W	12 November 1952	Ruin	Located in a central position in the gardens at Margam Park, to the NE of the orangery.	14149	See more images
Margam Abbey Undercroft	Margam; SS8019086230; 51°33′44″N 3°43′47″W	12 November 1952	Ruin	Located to the S of the Chapter House and E of Margam Orangery.	14150	See more images
Margam Castle Orangery	Margam; SS8011786234; 51°33′44″N 3°43′51″W	12 November 1952	Orangery	The centre-piece in the gardens at Margam Park. The abbey remains are immediately to the NE, with the broadwalk leading up to Margam Castle further E.	14152	See more images
Ivy Cottage including Façade of Former Banqueting House	Margam; SS8008086283; 51°33′46″N 3°43′53″W	12 November 1952	Cottage	Located along the N boundary of the gardens, N of the Orangery and SE of the kitchen gardens. The facade faces W into the park, whilst the cottage is outside the park boundary.	14153	See more images
Margam Castle	Margam; SS8049486284; 51°33′46″N 3°43′32″W	24 February 1975	Country House	Located in a high and prominent position at the E end of the gardens in Margam Park. Approached from the SW by a new drive.	14170	See more images
St Catharine's Church	Baglan; SS7526992225; 51°36′54″N 3°48′10″W	9 January 1976	Church	Prominently sited at the junction between St Illtyd's Drive and Church Road. The church is set within a walled churchyard with Baglan brook on the SE side.	14171	See more images

== See also ==
- Grade II* listed buildings in Neath Port Talbot
- Listed buildings in Wales
- List of scheduled monuments in Neath Port Talbot
- Registered historic parks and gardens in Neath Port Talbot
