= St Catharine's Church, Baglan =

Church in Neath Port Talbot, Wales

Coordinates: 51.6150°N 3.8029°W

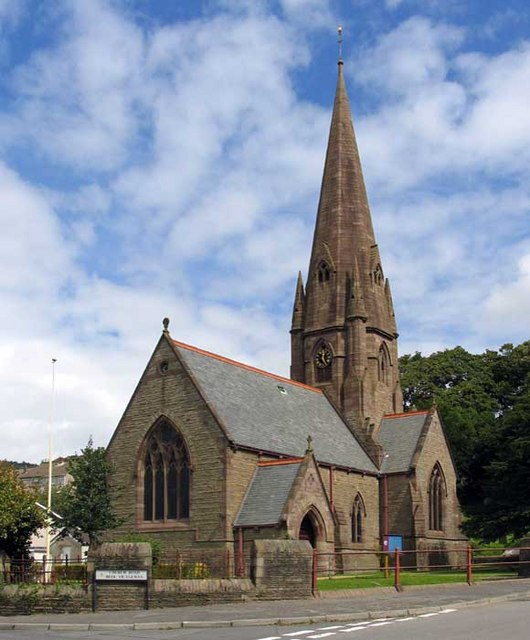
St Catharine's Church, Baglan

St Catharine's Church is the mother church of the parish of Baglan in Port Talbot, South Wales.

The church is a Grade I listed building (listed 1 September 1976), built between 1875 and 1882, at the expense of Griffith Llewellyn (1802–1888), then owner of nearby Baglan Hall (now demolished). It was consecrated by the incumbent Bishop of Llandaff, Alfred Ollivant, in 1882, shortly before the latter's death. Images of Griffith Llewellyn and Alfred Ollivant appear as headstops at the entrance door.

The church was constructed in the Decorated Gothic style, and dressed with Forest of Dean sandstone. John Prichard, Llandaff's diocesan architect, who also worked on the restoration of Llandaff Cathedral, was heavily involved in the design project, although the building work was superintended by a local architect named John Jones. It replaced the older St Baglan's Church, a pre-Norman building that was largely destroyed by a fire in 1954.

The interior uses Quarella stone, Forest of Dean sandstone and "Penarth" alabaster to create a polychromatic effect. The chancel is decorated with bands of marble and has a marble floor inlaid with Italian mosaic tiles. A brass memorial plaque commemorates Griffith Llewellyn and his wife Madelina (née Grenfell), both of whom are buried in the churchyard, close to the ruins of the original Saint Baglan's church, which is also listed.

Stained glass windows in the church include designs by William Morris (St Cecilia with Musical Angels) and Edward Burne-Jones (Crucifixion with the Virgin Mary and St John), as well as a Celtic Studios design installed in 1972.

== As film location ==
Scenes from the 1997 film Twin Town were filmed at St Catharine's.
