= Chris Needs =

Welsh radio personality and musician (1954–2020)

Chris Needs MBE
- Born: 12 March 1954; Cwmafan, Neath Port Talbot, Wales
- Died: 26 July 2020 (aged 66)
- Occupations: Radio presenter, pianist
- Employer: BBC Cymru Wales
- Board member of: Founder, Chris Needs Hospital Appeal
- Spouse: Gabe Cameron

Christopher Needs, MBE (12 March 1954 – 26 July 2020) was a Welsh radio broadcaster, best known as a regular evening and daytime presenter on BBC Radio Wales.

== Career ==
Needs was an accomplished pianist who had accompanied Bonnie Tyler and appeared on S4C programmes such as Noson Lawen. His other jobs included: language translator, actor, tour guide, and all-round vocal / piano entertainer, and through his work he has lived in Spain, Gibraltar, Belgium, the Netherlands, and Jersey. He spoke English, Welsh, Spanish and Dutch and was learning German.

He started his radio career with the Touch AM radio station before co-presenting the mid-morning magazine show Live Time on Radio Wales while also appearing on S4C television. From 2002 he had his own show, The Friendly Garden Programme, broadcast every week night. In the period up to 2003, Needs was joined nightly on his radio show by his friend Nikki-Sue, a show singer and Tina Turner impersonator.

== Personal life ==
Born in Cwmafan near Port Talbot, he was educated at local schools. During his teenage years he was sexually abused by someone whom he refused to identify, and consequently tried to commit suicide.

Chris Needs had known that he was gay while a teenager, and his husband, Gabe Cameron, often answered listeners' calls to the show.

=== Health and charity work ===
Needs established and headed the Chris Needs Hospital Appeal, a registered charity that supports South Wales hospitals. For his charity work and services to broadcasting he was awarded an MBE by Her Majesty Queen Elizabeth II in the 2005 New Year Honours.

Shortly after his mother died in 2001, Needs began having symptoms of diabetes. Eventually, when he went to his local pharmacy to have himself checked, his sugar level was 61 mmol/L (1,098 mg/dL). Subsequently diagnosed with Type 2 Diabetes, he acted as Diabetes Cymru's celebrity ambassador.

In 2016, Needs lost six stone as a result of an ulcerated throat. His experiences were followed in an S4C documentary.

Needs died on 26 July 2020 from a heart condition, aged 66.

== Awards ==
- 1996 – Sony Radio Academy Awards Silver Award for Best Regional Presenter.
- 2009 – Variety Club of Great Britain Lifetime Achievement Award.

== Books ==
- 2007 – Like It Is: My Autobiography
- 2008 – The Jenkins's's's's's
- 2009 – And There's More ... My Autobiography – part 2
- 2013 - Highs And Lows
