= Craig Ty-Isaf =

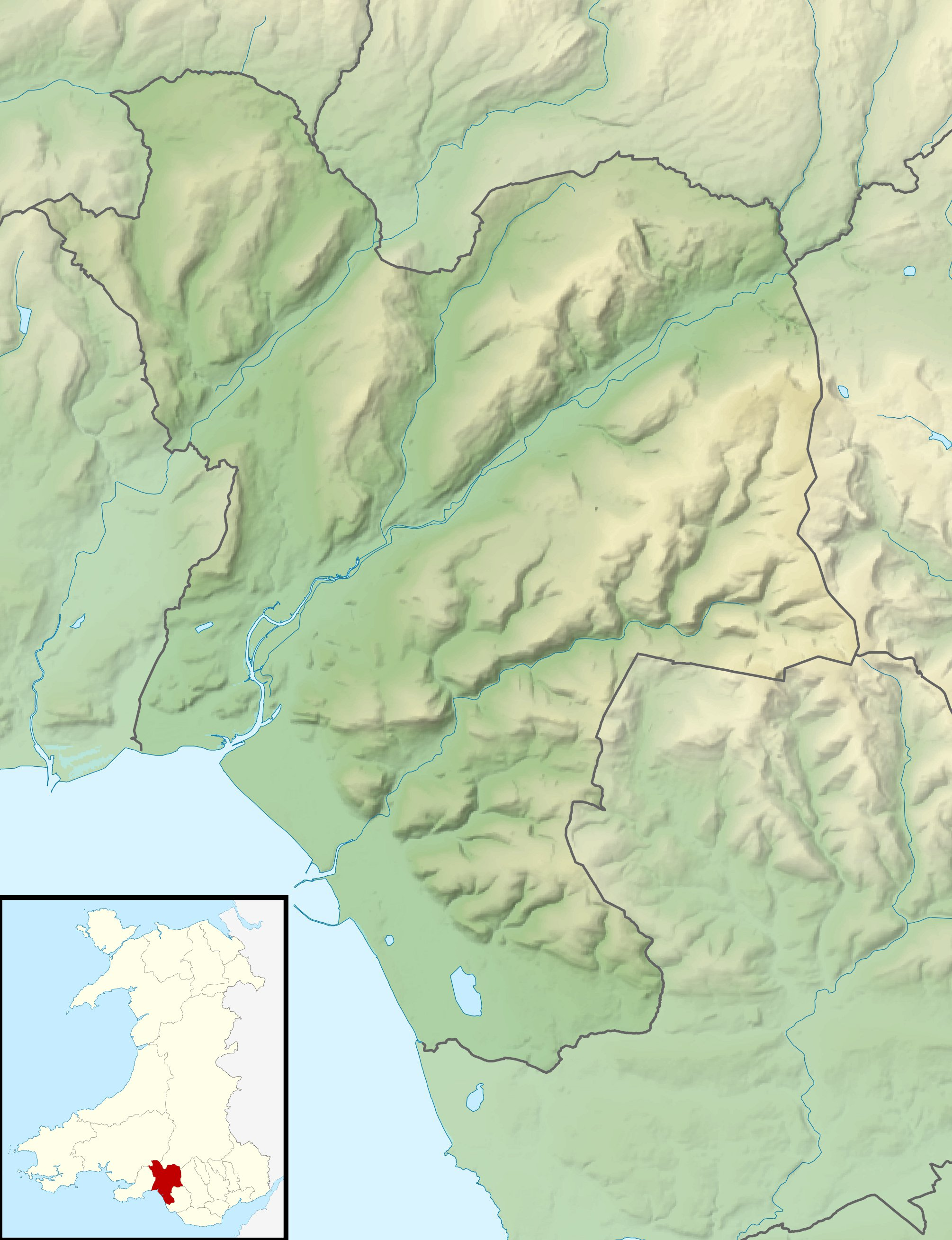
- Craig Ty-Isaf, within Baglan Community, Neath Port Talbot
- 51.6254°N 3.7979°W
- Type: Hillfort
- Periods: Iron Age
- Cultures: Celtic Brittonic
- Location: Southern flank of Mynydd y Gaer near Baglan, Neath Port Talbot, Wales (OS Grid ref SS756933)
- Region: South Wales

Site notes
- Area: 0.2 ha (0.49 acres)
- Condition: Banks and ditches within woodland.
- Public access: Yes, but not on a path.

Scheduled monument
- Designated: 1959
- Reference no.: GM263

Craig Ty-Isaf is a small hillfort in Baglan community, Neath Port Talbot, in South Wales. It is one of three hillforts on the area of hillside known as Mynydd y Gaer, and is within Briton Ferry Woods. The hillfort is on the SW side of the hill, overlooking Baglan, an oval enclosing some 0.2ha. A broad rubble bank forms the oval enclosure, and on the east two further banks mean that the area of banks and ditches encompasses a much larger area for the site as a whole, which is a Scheduled Monument. There are various internal features thought to be the result of more recent test cuts for mineral extraction.

== Earthworks ==
The earthworks define an enclosure 210m above sea level, 65m across from east to west, and 45m from north to south. The northern ramparts run along the crest of the east–west ridge, so that the hillfort lies on the upper slopes of the ridge, overlooking Baglan to the south. The earliest earthworks appear to be a complete oval of rubble banks, some 2.5m high and 9m wide. A second bank runs along the east side (the uphill end of the ridge), and appears to be the same age as the main earthwork. A gap through these two banks formed the original entrance. As a later addition, a third bank, further east, runs across the same line, and has no gap, suggesting the entrance had moved. The outer bank is straighter than the earlier banks, so the ditch between ranges in width from 6m to 20m across. Two other ditches within the enclosure relate to more recent mining activity.

The site was declared a Scheduled Monument in 1959, and is included in the RCAHMW 1971 inventory of ancient sites in Glamorgan, as one of the 24 most significant hillforts in Glamorgan.

== Access ==
There are no footpaths that cross the site, however the whole area is within the woodland of the Forestry Commission Briton Ferry Woods, and the wood is a mix of mature broadleaved trees and planted conifers. It has a number of marked trails through the woods, and is open to the public. Craig Ty-Isaf is on the south east arm of the woods. An inland section of the Wales Coast Path runs along the lower edge of the woods, 200m south of the hillfort.

== See also ==
- List of Scheduled Monuments in Neath Port Talbot
