= Cwmafan =

Cwmafan: Cwmavon
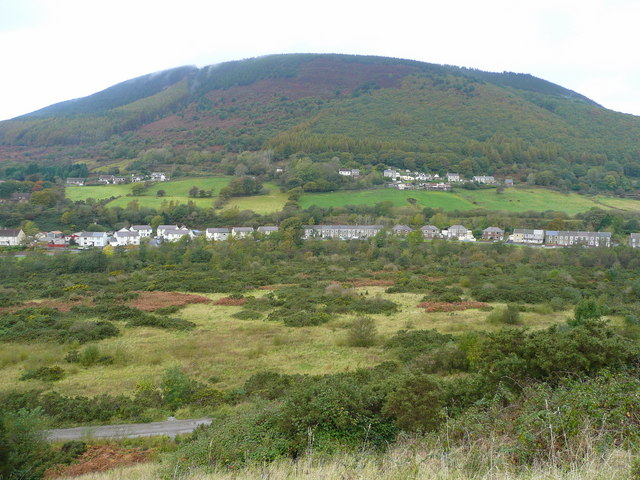
- View across the Afan Valley

- Location within Neath Port Talbot
- Population: 6,538 (2011)
- OS grid reference: SS774922
- Community: Cwmafan
- Principal area: Neath Port Talbot
- Preserved county: West Glamorgan
- Country: Wales
- Sovereign state: United Kingdom
- Post town: PORT TALBOT
- Postcode district: SA12
- Dialling code: 01639
- Police: South Wales
- Fire: Mid and West Wales
- Ambulance: Welsh
- UK Parliament: Aberafan Maesteg
- Senedd Cymru – Welsh Parliament: Aberavon
- List of places UK Wales Neath Port Talbot 51.615511°N 3.771745°W Map of the community

Cwmafan (Welsh pronunciation), also known as Cwmavon, is a large village and community in the Afan valley in Wales, lying within Neath Port Talbot County Borough. It had a population of 5,615 at the 2011 Census. Cwmafan is known for having a high percentage of Welsh speakers. In many ways it is a suburb of the nearby town of Port Talbot which is less than 2 miles (3 km) to the south. The literal translation of Cwmafan from Welsh to English is complex, Cwm means valley with Afan as the name of the river flowing through, hence the village residing within the Afan Valley. It could be a version of Afon which means river, so literally the "River Valley", this is common in Wales and the UK with many rivers being called Afon or Avon. There is also a Saint Afan, which it is possible the river was named after. There have been other suggestions but none accepted locally.

== Geography ==
The village is surrounded by hills: the biggest is Foel Fynyddau, which stands 370 m (1200 ft) high and stands above the northern edge of the village. West of Foel Fynyddau is Mynydd-y-Gaer: at its summit the community boundaries of Cwmafan, Baglan and Briton Ferry all meet. The River Afan runs through the village from north-east to south-west; the village is on the right bank. The area of Ynysygwas lies immediately across the river, Brynbryddan adjoins Cwmafan to the west and Pwllyglaw adjoins Cwmafan to the north-east (ie up the valley). The B4286 road runs through the village along the valley, and the A4107 runs along the valley on the opposite bank.

== History ==
The village has an industrial history, with metalworking being particularly significant. There were large copper, iron and tin works as well as many coal mines close by. The metal ores, from as far away as Chile, were off-loaded in Port Talbot or Swansea docks and brought by rail to Cwmafan.

In 1985 the Ynys-y-Gwas bridge suddenly collapsed, cutting off the water supply to the residents. A resident of Maesteg, Paul Barry, escaped unharmed from the incident, despite being on the bridge when it collapsed.

== Culture ==
=== Sports teams ===
The village is also home to several sporting grounds, the most prominent of these being the Welfare Ground, home to Cwmavon RFC who are currently playing in the Welsh Rugby Union leagues. A second rugby union pitch along with a football pitch, tennis courts and bowling green are located at " Parc Siencyn Powell" (Formerly named Parc-y-Llyn), which is administered by Neath Port Talbot County Borough Council.

== Residents of note ==
- William Abraham, trade unionist and MP.
- Chris Needs is a BBC Radio Wales presenter who grew up in Cwmavon.
- Joseph John Richards, born between Cwmavon and Aberavon, became famous in the United States as a composer of march tunes and a bandleader.
- George Thomas, Viscount Tonypandy, was living at 62 Gower Street, Cwmavon, age 3, in the 1911 census.
- Lyn Jones, former Wales international rugby union player, later coach of the Ospreys.
- Rees Richards, a Wales international at rugby union and rugby league was born in Cwmavon.
