= Cwrt Sart Comprehensive School =

Cwrt Sart Community Comprehensive School

Location
- Old Road, Briton Ferry; Briton Ferry, Neath Port Talbot, SA11 2ET; Wales; 51°38′36″N 3°48′57″W

Information
- Type: Comprehensive School
- Motto: Cyflwyni trwy Gredu ("Achieving through believing")
- Established: 1900s
- Closed: 25 August 2016
- Head Master: Steve Peers
- Staff: 60 (approx.)
- Gender: Unisex
- Age: 11 to 16
- Enrolment: 530 (approx.)
- Houses: Ty Coch, Ty Melyn, Ty Gwyrdd, Ty Piws
- Colours: Blue, Green and White
- Website: http://cwrtsartcomp.co.uk/

Cwrt Sart Community Comprehensive was a school located in Briton Ferry, Neath, Wales. It was one of the secondary schools in Neath Port Talbot, taking pupils aged 11 to 16. It opened as a council school in 1920.

== Renaming ==
In 2008, the name of Cwrt Sart Comprehensive School was officially changed to Cwrt Sart Community Comprehensive School. This was carried out under the headmaster Huw Lloyd, in an attempt to incorporate the Briton Ferry community in the school. Earlier, in 2007–2008, the school motto was changed from Man's wealth is his ability to Cyflwyni trwy gredu or Achieving through believing. This was a modernisation, as the old motto was viewed as sexist, and focused on older idealisms.

== Closure ==
In the autumn of 2010 there was a proposal by Neath Port Talbot council to close Cwrt Sart and two Port Talbot schools, and build a single replacement at Baglan Moors, Port Talbot, to open in September 2016. The spur for this was the falling rolls. A campaign to retain it was headed up by the governing body, with much local support. A lengthy consultation period meant that a final decision was not taken until December 2013, when the Welsh Government approved the building of a £40million replacement school. Cwrt Sart closed on 20 July 2016, three years after a final decision was made to close the school. Cwrt Sart officially closed its doors to pupils on 25 August 2016, after results day. A few months later plans to knock the existing site down and replace it with a new Welsh speaking primary school "Ysgol Newydd Briton Ferry" started and are still ongoing.

== Carreg Hir ==
In the school playground was The Carreg Hir ('long stone'), a standing stone probably dating to the Bronze Age, 9 ft 2 in (2.8 m) high, 5 ft 7 in (1.7 m) wide and about 2 ft (0.6 m) thick. The stone was set into a concrete plinth in recent times, though it is believed to be in its original location. Archaeologists think that it may once have stood upon a mound, overlooking the River Neath. It is a Scheduled Monument.

There is a published 1848 reference to this stone in which it says that "there is a charm, not yet discovered, which can compel [the stone] to speak, and for once to reveal the secret of its history: but that having once spoken it will be silent forever." Another legend says that there is an underground passage leading between the stone and Neath Abbey some 1.3 miles (2.1 km) to the North; the stone is said to be aligned upon it.
