= Briton Ferry =

Town in Neath Port Talbot, Wales

Briton Ferry: Welsh: Llansawel
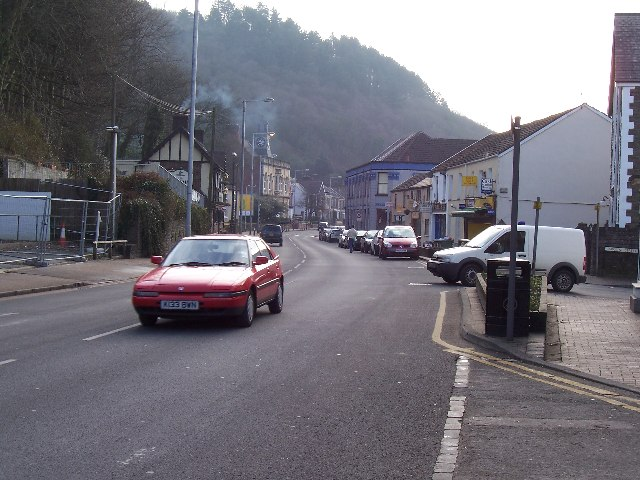

- Location within Neath Port Talbot
- Population: 5,911 (2909 East ward and 3002 West ward) (2 Wards 2011)
- OS grid reference: SS735945
- Principal area: Neath Port Talbot
- Preserved county: West Glamorgan
- Country: Wales
- Sovereign state: United Kingdom
- Post town: NEATH
- Postcode district: SA11
- Dialling code: 01639
- Police: South Wales
- Fire: Mid and West Wales
- Ambulance: Welsh
- UK Parliament: Aberafan Maesteg
- List of places UK Wales Neath Port Talbot 51.637°N 3.821°W Map of the community

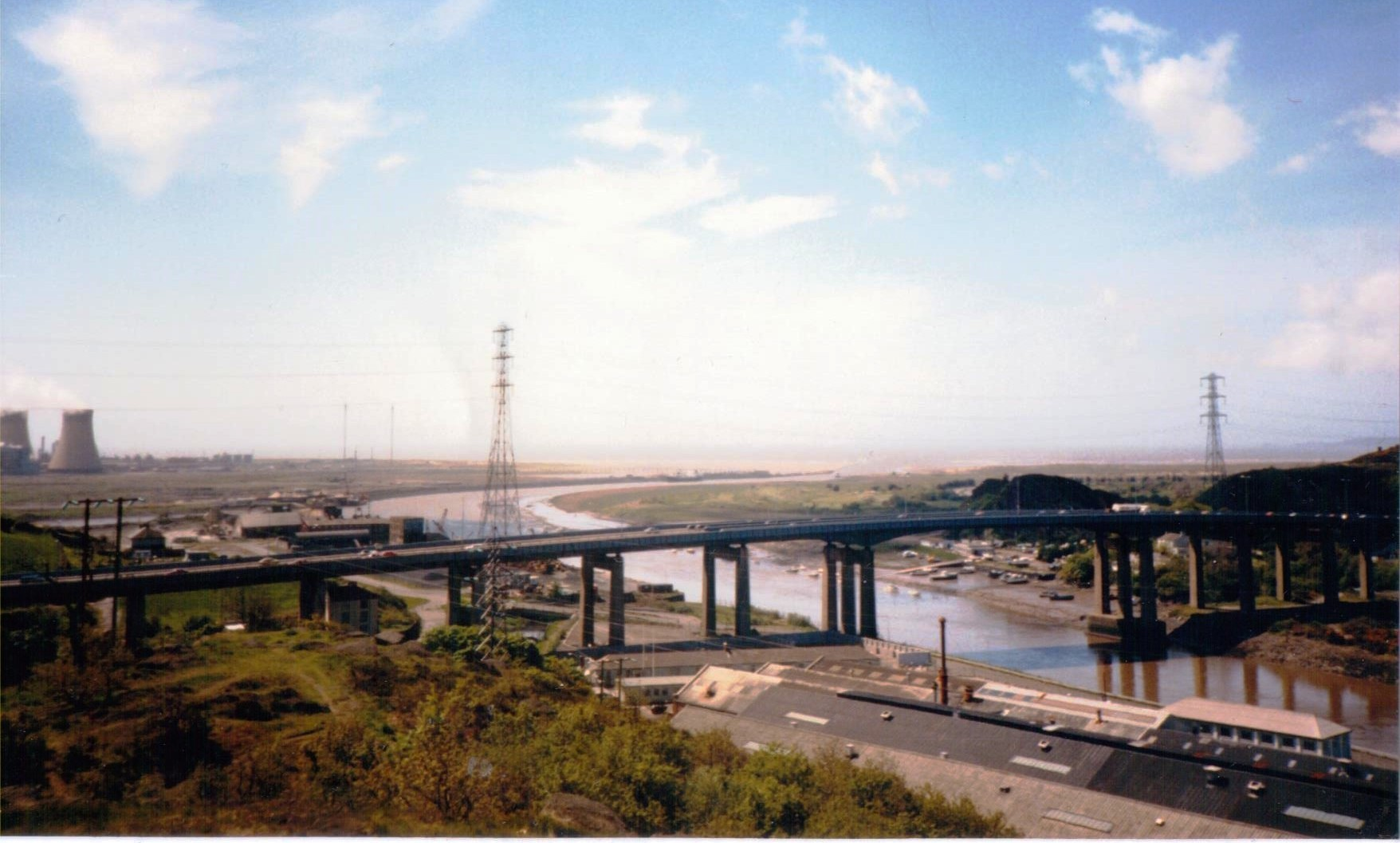
The western viaduct of the first road crossing of the River Neath at Briton Ferry in 1986

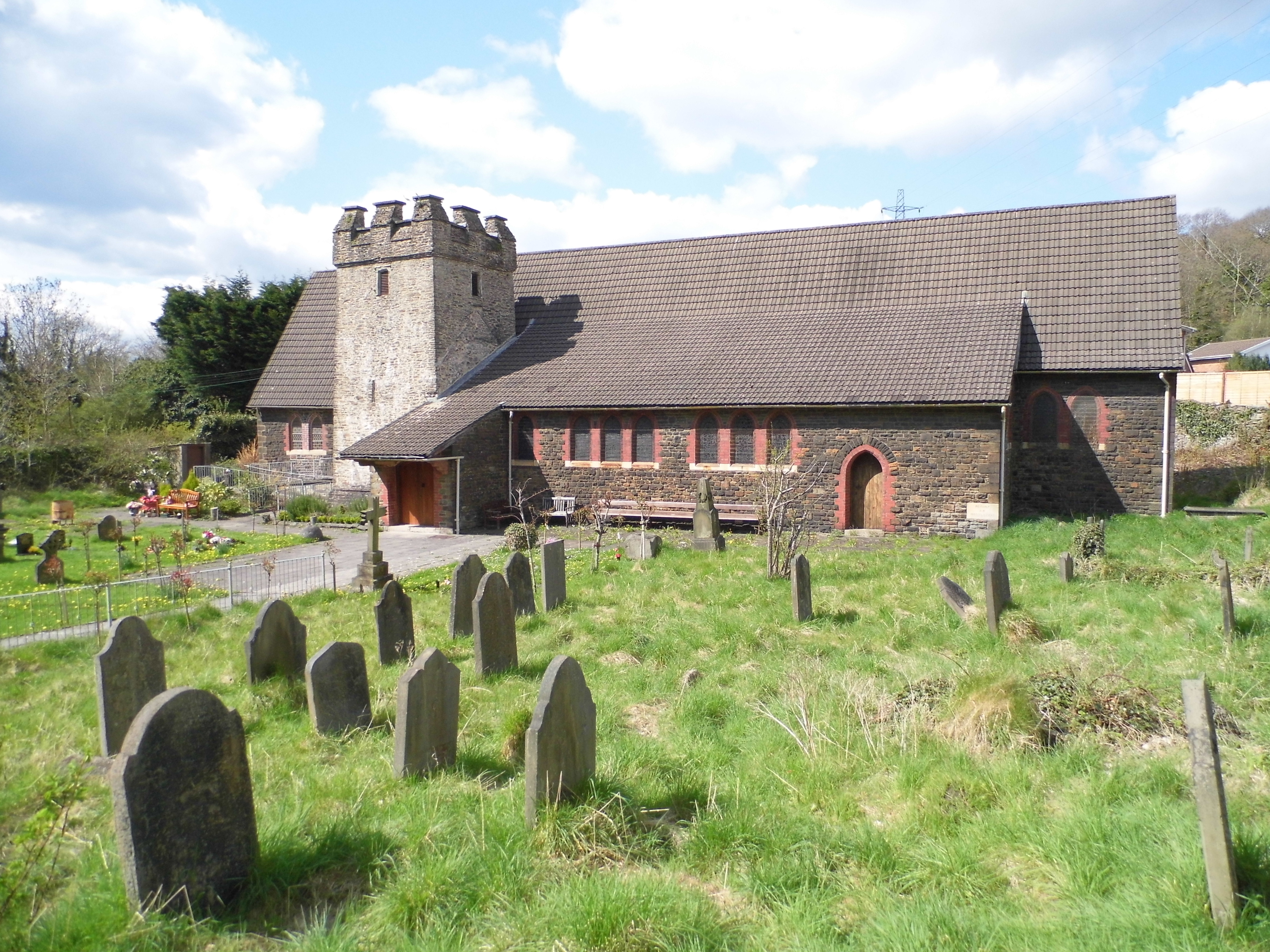
The first St Mary's Church (pictured here in 2013) was founded in the 6th century

Briton Ferry (Welsh: Llansawel) is a town and community in the county borough of Neath Port Talbot, Wales. The Welsh name may indicate that the church, llan, is protected from the wind, awel. Alternatively, Sawel may be a derivative of Saul, St Paul's earlier name, who, supposedly, once landed at Briton Ferry. An alternative Welsh name unused today is Rhyd y Brython, a direct translation of Briton Ferry. The Normans referred to the River crossing as La Brittonne and Leland in 1540 as Britanne Fery.

== Background ==
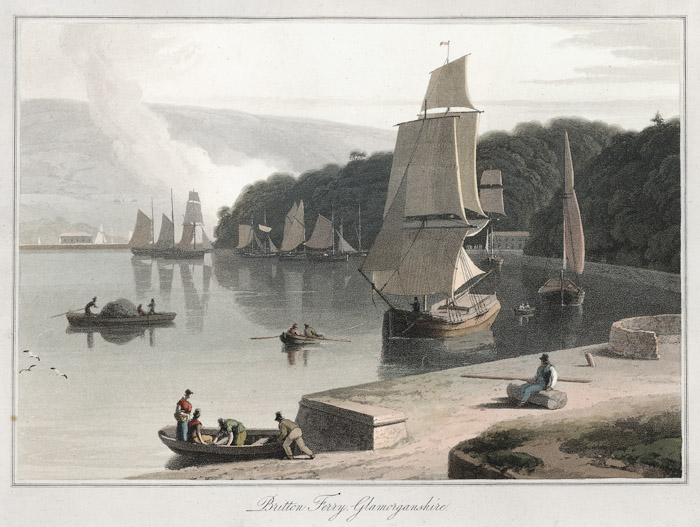
William Daniell's Briton Ferry, painted in 1814 (Tate Gallery)

Briton Ferry is on the mouth of the River Neath, where it enters Swansea Bay, and is the first river crossing along the Roman road that follows the coastline along that part of South Wales. A milestone dedicated to Victorinus, a former Roman Governor in Gaul and Britain, was found at nearby Baglan. The ferry boat crossing was some 2 miles (3.2 km) from the bridge across the River Neath at Neath. At certain low tides, it was possible to walk across the river via a ford close to the ferry route using stepping stones.

Briton Ferry lies on the heavily fractured ground near the mouth of the River Neath on a line between the upper and middle coal measures. The original course of the River Neath may have been through the Jersey Marine gap between the isolated hills, which formed a rocky ridge between Briton Ferry and Jersey Marine. Beyond the ridge, the sands of Baglan Bay extended into Briton Ferry until the mid-nineteenth century when the estuary’s saltings were developed for industry. Today, the river crossing comprises two bridge crossings which carry the M4 motorway and A483 road across the river.

There are remains of ancient Iron Age hill forts on the hills around Briton Ferry, they are named Buarth-y-Gaer and Gaer Fawr, and situated on Mynydd-y-Gaer alongside the boundary with Baglan. A Neolithic stone is in place within the grounds of Cwrt Sart school. A plaque alongside the stone is inscribed, "When removed, it will speak but once to reveal its secret, and then remain silent forever." One explanation for the name of the nearby Giant's Grave is the presence of a cromlech. At Crymlyn Burrows, an unlooped Bronze Age axe (c.1400 BC) was discovered.

The town was part of the Briton Ferry Estate, whose lands belonged to Margam Abbey before they passed on, in turn, to the Mansel, Villiers, and Vernon families (Earls of Jersey). It had been owned by the Price family of Briton Ferry in the early 17th century until the Mansels inherited it. There it remained until Louisa Barbara Mansell married George Venables Vernon in 1757. There was no male issue, so she left the estate to her godson George, Earl of Jersey. He modernised and reduced the size of the estate to ensure its viability.

== Industrial development ==
=== Early industrialisation ===
As early as the 1660s, primitive forges existed at Briton Ferry, later using local coal from small pits such as Price's Drift, but Briton Ferry's marine location stimulated its industrial development. In 1840, an area of about 750 acres (3.0 km^{2}) of land in Cwmafan was leased for 99 years to John Vigurs and subsequently passed to Wright, Butler & Co. Ltd, then to Baldwins Ltd. The terraces of houses built on this land were sublet in 1897 and 1898 for the remainder of the term of this lease, but many were declared unfit for habitation in the 1930s and demolished. In the late 18th and early 19th centuries, coastal shipping at Giant's Grave's wharves loaded coal for export from pits in the Neath Valley via Neath Canal and unloaded iron ore and limestone. The canal was completed in 1797, becoming the second in Glamorgan, running 14 miles (22.53 km) from Abernant to Briton Ferry. 1841 Neath Abbey Iron Co laid plans for an ironwork on the east bank of the river at Warren Hill. With the development of railways in the second half of the 19th century, Isambard Kingdom Brunel designed Briton Ferry Dock to handle coal and other goods for the Vale of Neath Railway. It opened in 1861 following the town's ironworks in 1846 and the Red Jacket and Briton Ferry Copperworks on the West Bank of the river in 1849 and 1853. The 1860s saw the start of tinplate manufacturing from puddled iron until steel-making started in the town at the end of the 19th century.

=== Later industrialisation ===
Further industrialisation brought factories such as the Vernon, Gwalia, Wern, Baglan Bay Tinplate, and Whitford Sheet Works, receiving their raw material from the Albion and Briton Ferry Steelworks. Taylor's Foundry, Baglan Engineering and Thos. W. Ward serviced these industries. They were built on land close to the River Neath and the South Wales Railway built by Isambard Kingdom Brunel. The industrial development attracted other railways, including the Neath and Brecon Railway, the Rhondda and Swansea Bay Railway, and the South Wales Mineral Railway with its cable-powered incline.

== Briton Ferry floating dock ==
Briton Ferry Dock and Railway Act 1851
- Act of Parliament
- Parliament of the United Kingdom
- Long title: An Act for making and maintaining Docks at Baglan Bay in the County of Glamorgan, with a Branch Line of Railway to the South Wales Railway.
- Citation: 14 & 15 Vict. c. xlix

Dates
- Royal assent: 3 July 1851

Text of statute as originally enacted

Briton Ferry Dock Act 1857
- Act of Parliament
- Parliament of the United Kingdom
- Long title: An Act to empower the Briton Ferry Floating Dock Company to raise Money; and for other Purposes connected with their Undertaking.
- Citation: 20 & 21 Vict. c. lxxix

Dates
- Royal assent: 27 July 1857

Text of statute as originally enacted

Briton Ferry Dock Act 1862
- Act of Parliament
- Parliament of the United Kingdom
- Long title: An Act for authorizing Agreements between the Briton Ferry Dock and Railway Company and other Companies, and a Lease of Part of their Wharfs and for altering Rates payable to the Neath Harbour Commissioners; and for authorizing the Briton Ferry Dock and Railway Company to raise further Capital; and for other Purposes.
- Citation: 25 & 26 Vict. c. clxxviii

Dates
- Royal assent: 29 July 1862

Text of statute as originally enacted

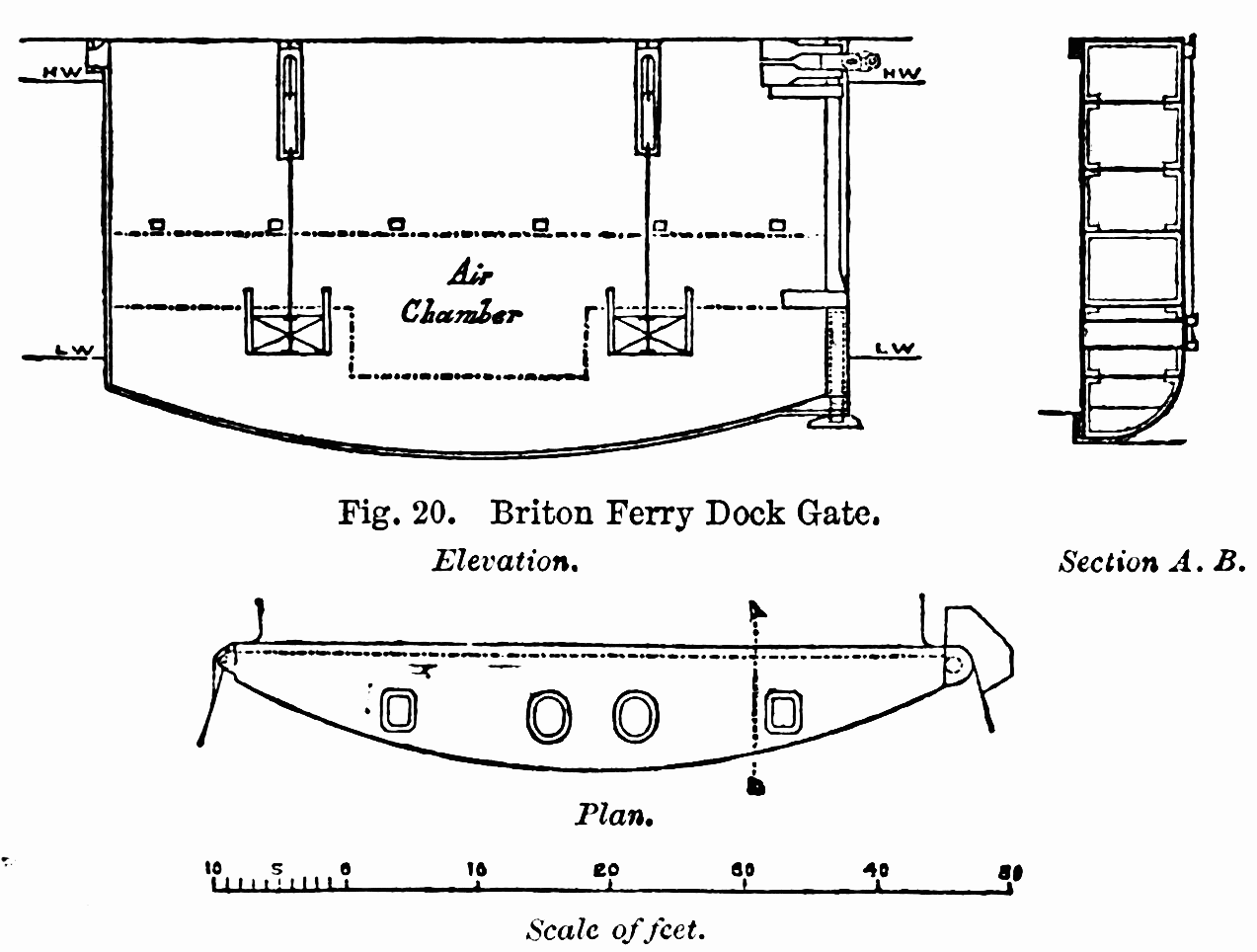
Drawing of the dock gate

The Briton Ferry Floating Dock Company was incorporated by the Briton Ferry Dock and Railway Act 1851 (14 & 15 Vict. c. xlix), and bought land from the Earl of Jersey to build the Briton Ferry Docks. When it opened in 1861, the dock consisted of an outer tidal basin which had round-ended jetties at its mouth and quays along its sides and an inner floating dock of 5.3 hectares, enclosed by masonry walls and sandstone. The water level was maintained by a single gate, which included a buoyancy chamber. It covered an area of 23.7 acres (9.6 ha). The gate was 56 feet (17 m) wide, and the unique structure with its floating caisson was designed by Brunel's father, Sir Marc Brunel. Following Brunel's death in 1859, Robert Brereton took over as engineer and also acted as engineer for improvements made in 1872 and 1873.

Briton Ferry Dock (Transfer) Act 1873
- Act of Parliament
- Parliament of the United Kingdom
- Long title: An Act for vesting the undertaking of the Briton Ferry Floating Dock Company in the Great Western Railway Company; and for other purposes.
- Citation: 36 & 37 Vict. c. ccxii

Dates
- Royal assent: 28 July 1873

Text of statute as originally enacted

The company went bankrupt and the Great Western Railway took over the docks by the Briton Ferry Dock (Transfer) Act 1873 (36 & 37 Vict. c. ccxii). They were nationalised along with the Great Western Railway, until they were closed in 1959. The inner basin has been largely built upon.

In 2000, the dock walls and lock gate were Grade II listed for their industrial and archaeological interest as the major surviving built component of Brunel's docks. The dock is a scheduled monument.

As part of a regeneration programme instigated by Briton Ferry Brunel Dock Trust in 2005 to preserve, restore and maintain the heritage of Brunel's historic site and its structures for public benefit, a tower, which formed part of the complex, was refurbished. It was an accumulator tower for the hydraulic system, which operated the dock gate and cranes. The system was designed by William Armstrong, and in 2010, the Institution of Civil Engineers unveiled a plaque at the site to commemorate the 200th anniversary of his birth. The outer basin has potential use by fishing boats and yachts.

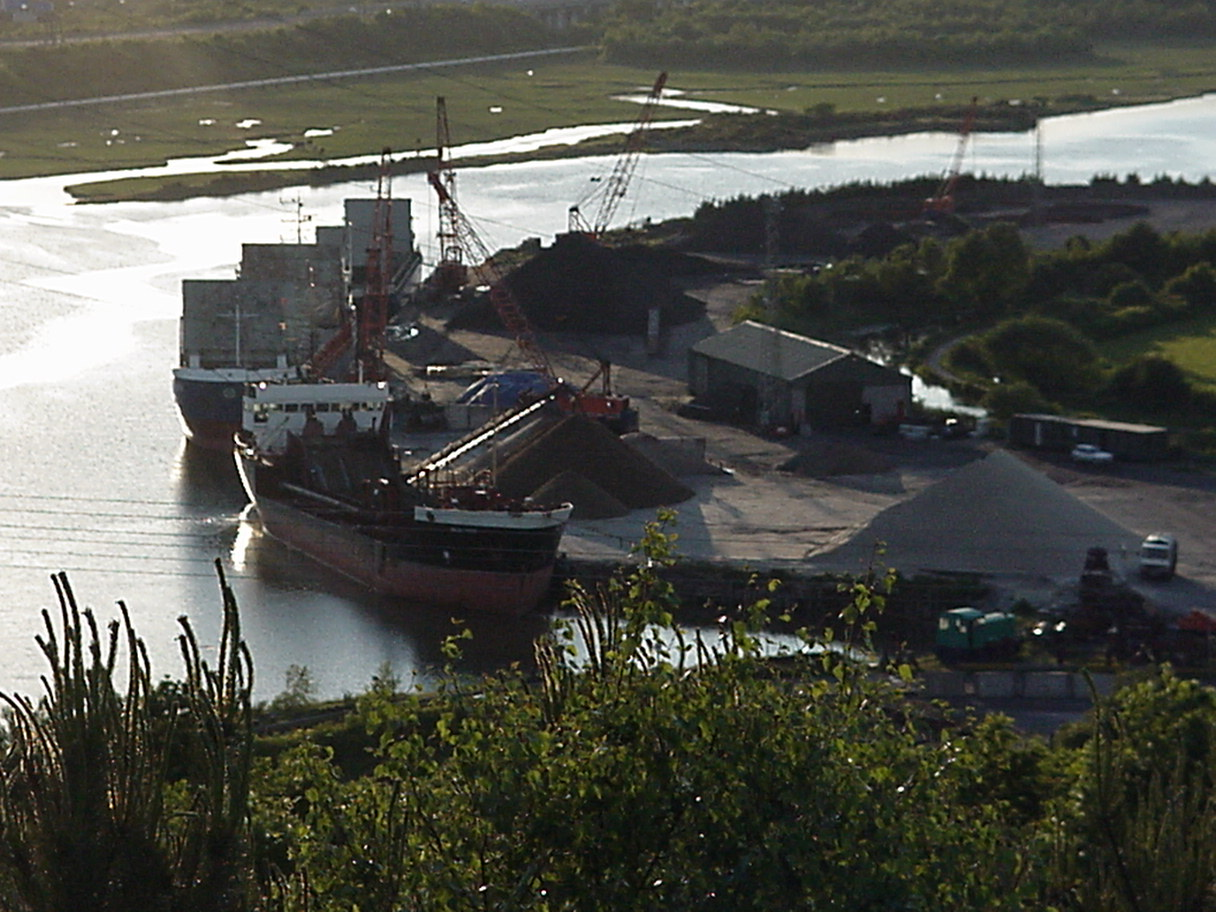
Giant's Grave wharf was once Thos. W. Ward's ship breaking yard

The ship-breaking of WW2 ships, such as HMS Bermuda, took place at Giant's Grave upstream of the floating dock, and north of the M4 and A48 crossings. Huw Pudner and Chris Hastings, two local songwriters, wrote "Giants Grave", a song about the ship-breaking industry in Briton Ferry which was featured in the film The History of Briton Ferry by Jason May.

The wharves at Briton Ferry are run by Neath Port Authority, the most important of which are Giant's Wharf, which handles steel, scrap, coke, coal and machine parts, and Ironworks Wharf, which handles minerals such as sand and cement. They offer tidal and river berths with a maximum depth of 7.1 metres (7.8 yd). Between them, 200 vessels a year are handled.

== The Mouchel phenomenon ==
In 1875, the French-born engineer Louis Gustave Mouchel established himself in Briton Ferry and quickly became involved in several successful enterprises. His consultancy company was directly responsible for introducing ferroconcrete (also called reinforced concrete) to Britain. In neighbouring Swansea, a building constructed for Weaver and Co mills claimed to be the first entirely ferroconcrete building in the United Kingdom.

So important was Briton Ferry for trade with France that Mouchel was, from 1879 to his death, French Consular Agent to Briton Ferry, Talbot, Porthcawl and Neath Abbey.

== Housing ==
Most housing in the 19th century was built by local private builders, sometimes for local industry or the railways. This can be seen at Giant’s Grave, Warren Hill, and near the dock. Municipal housing in Briton Ferry started as a result of the Housing of the Workers Act 1890 and continued as a result of 20th-century housing legislation just before and following World War II. High-rise housing was attempted in the 1950s due to a shortage of building land, but it was not a success. In the late 20th century the high-rise housing and much of the earliest housing near the docks was demolished and replaced by more municipal housing. As a participant in the Swansea Bay City Deal, Neath-Port Talbot Council aims for a share in the project to future-proof at least 10,300 properties over five years by making low carbon, energy-efficient homes, with 7,000 retro-fitted to existing houses and 3,300 newly built.

== De-industrialisation ==
A consortium of steel and tinplate producers consolidated all tinplate mills to create the Steel Company of Wales in 1947. By 1953, only the Albion Steelworks remained in the town, all other tinplate production having ceased.

The Albion Steelworks, which had used oil to fuel its largest open-hearth furnace, closed in November 1978 and was demolished within a year. This was followed by the closure of the ship-breaker and steel supplier Thos. W. Ward in 1983. The firm at Giant's Grave, which operated from 1906 until 1979, broke up 197 merchant ships and 94 Admiralty.

The steel and tinplate industry's demise in the second half of the twentieth century was followed in the first two decades by closures of other local firms that had employed many from Briton Ferry. BP Chemicals opened its plant at nearby Baglan Bay in 1963, quickly expanding into one of the biggest petrochemical sites in Europe; by 1974 it was employing 2500 staff. The advent of North Sea oil proved injurious since its location meant it was on the "wrong" side of Britain to receive oil supplies from the North Sea. This situation, along with a further decline in demand for its products, gradually reduced the size of the plant, and in 2004 it closed entirely. BP's oil refinery at Llandarcy closed four years later. The Metal Box Company's closure was announced in 2015, and its premises were bought by Neath-Port Talbot Council in 2017.

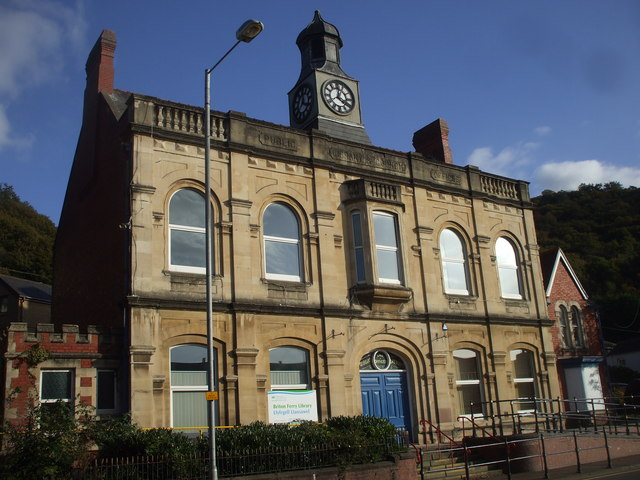
Briton Ferry Community Resource Centre- former Briton Ferry Library

The industrial revolution brought much expansion to Briton Ferry, including ironworks, steelworks, tinplate production and engineering. Production generally lasted until the 1970s. In 1951, as the industry began to dwindle, portions of the estate were sold to the Principality Property Co., Estateways Builders, John Oliver Watkins, the City & Provincial Housing Association, and Gwalia Land & Property Developments Ltd.

== Modern development ==
The economic transformation of the area in the second half of the last century resulted in few original industries surviving in the town, though new industries have been created in Neath-Port Talbot's adjacent communities of Baglan, Jersey Marine and Melyncryddan. Intertissue, a paper converter new to Baglan Energy Park, employs a workforce of 447. The park has the potential to create and accommodate 7,000 jobs over the next 25 years. £15 million has been invested in a solar energy farm on the park. Baglan Energy Park's on-site power generation provides competitively priced electricity to businesses within the area using a combined-cycle gas turbine power plant. In Jersey Marine, Amazon opened its 74,000 m^{2} (800,000 sq ft) distribution warehouse in 2008.

== Government and politics ==
Briton Ferry had an urban district council from 1895 to 1922, when it formed part of Aberavon parliamentary constituency. The growth of the town's metals industries at that time was accompanied by the growth of independent working-class representation and strong socialist, internationalist, and pacifist traditions. Prominent Independent Labour Party representatives were Councillor Joe Branch, Ivor O. Thomas and Ivor H. Thomas, the founder of the South Wales branch of the National Council for Civil Liberties. Branch was the first chair of the constituency Labour Party. Ramsay MacDonald was associated with the tradition and represented the town as MP within the Aberavon constituency. He became the leader of the opposition in 1922 and became Prime Minister in 1924. His constituency office was at Chequers in Briton Ferry. Many speakers visited the town at that time, including Bertrand Russell, Norman Angell, Keir Hardie, Ernest Bevin, Thomas Mann, E. D. Morel, Charlotte Despard, Emmeline Pankhurst, and Sylvia Pankhurst. For mainly political reasons, thirty-seven of the town's residents were imprisoned during World War I for opposing conscription. Along with seventy objectors from Aberavon and district, these communities provided the country's strongest opposition to the war, despite the town's loss of 120 soldiers' lives during World War I. The town had the distinction of providing Parliament with four MPs during 1955: Dai L. Mort, Ivor O. Thomas, Raymond Gower and Ronald Rees.

The town is currently in the parliamentary constituency of Aberafan Maesteg, having been in Neath constituency from 1945 until 1983. The current MP is Stephen Kinnock, while the current Senedd Member is David Rees along with four regional members for South Wales West. The town encompasses the electoral wards of Briton Ferry East and Briton Ferry West. Today, the Town Council consists of twelve members and meets monthly in the Council Chamber at the Community Resource Centre, the community-managed library.

== Transport ==
=== Trains ===
The railway was important in the town's industrial development town, and much of the core rail infrastructure remains. The town is served by the Briton Ferry railway station, which is now accessed from Shelone Road. It is near the Cwrt Sart junction, where the Swansea District Line meets the South Wales Main Line. For passenger services, Briton Ferry is served by two principal operators. The first, Transport for Wales, runs regional trains to Swansea and West Wales and also to Cardiff and Manchester via the Welsh Marches line. In contrast, First Great Western trains from Swansea to London do not stop here. The typical service pattern has been one train approximately every two hours in each direction, but Transport for Wales, which took over the Wales and Borders franchise in October 2018, intends to operate further services.

=== Buses ===
The town is served by twelve local services and three express services which pickup from various stops within the town. The local buses are operated by First Cymru and cater for local shoppers, colleges and hospitals in the Neath-Port Talbot area, while the express services are provided to reach Bridgend, Maesteg and Swansea.

=== Roads ===
The M4 and the A483 bypass the town to relieve the traffic on the A474, a former Roman road, which runs through the town parallel to the main railway line and connects Neath with Port Talbot.

==== First road crossing ====
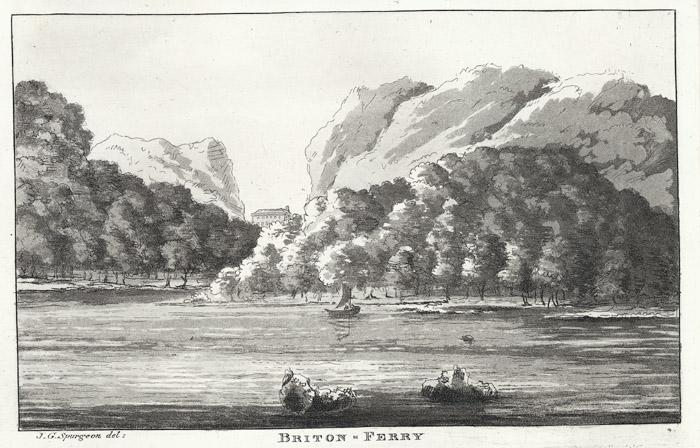
Crossing the River (Spurgeon)

Construction of the first river bridge crossing took place from 1949–1955 and was one of the first large-scale road bridges to be constructed in Britain after World War II as part of the A48 Neath bypass road scheme. It comprises two viaducts. The western viaduct crosses the River Neath, and the eastern viaduct crosses the former dock area of Briton Ferry and the South Wales main railway line.

==== Second road crossing ====
The second road crossing was completed in 1994 to carry the London to Wales M4 motorway across the River Neath to supersede the A48. Briton Ferry has junction J42, which is 184 miles (296 km) from the motorway's eastern end and 15 mi (24 km) from its western at Pont Abraham. It filled the final 6.2 mi (10 km) gap in the motorway between Newport and west Wales, Its completion presented formidable problems, with extensive industrial and commercial development, estuarine flood-lands and the navigable River Neath all lying in the path of possible routes.

== Landmarks, attractions and recreation ==
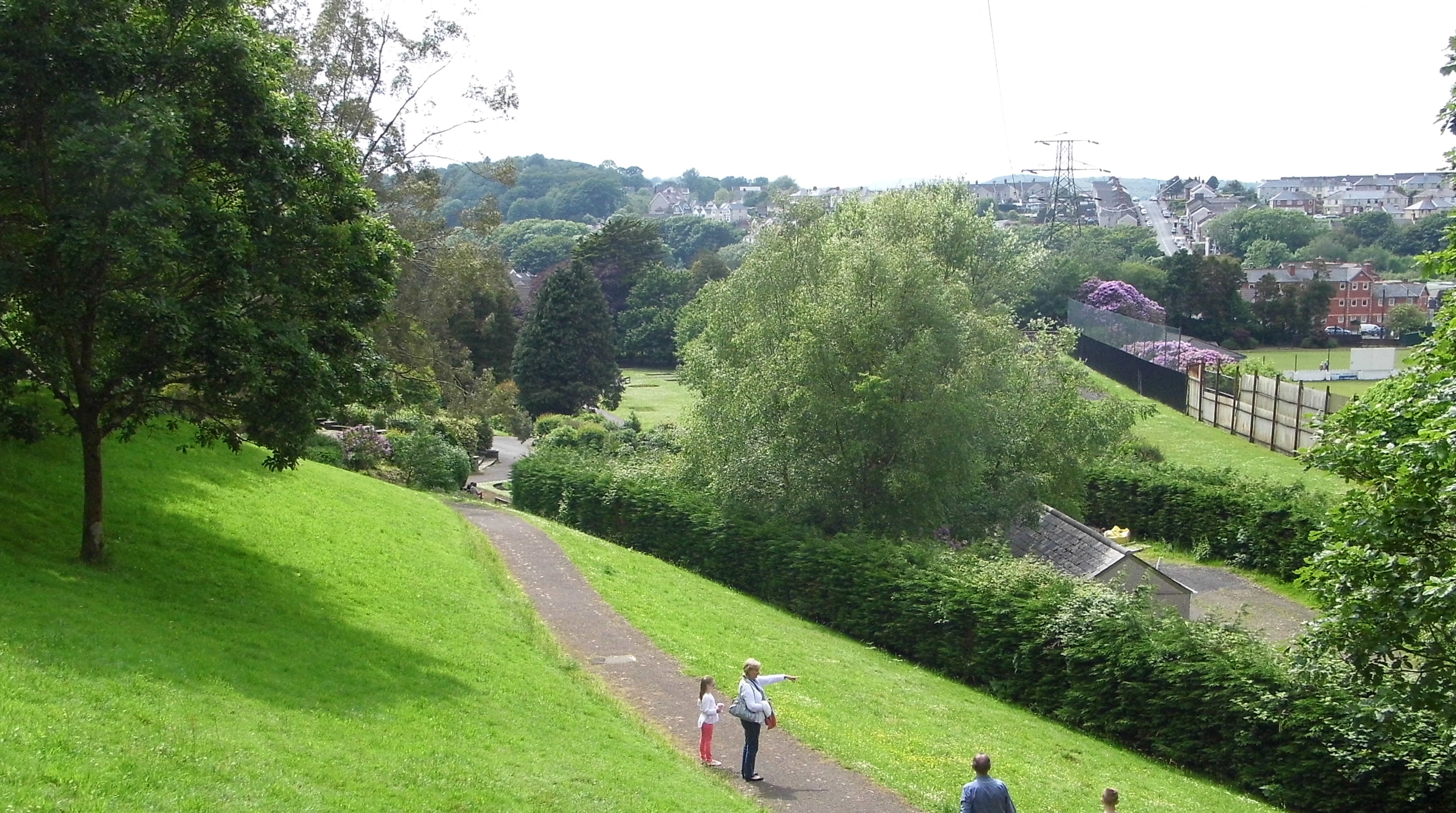
Jersey Park's original layout remains complete.

John Mills's sculpture at the southern end of the town, The Crossing, symbolises the town's industrial and maritime history through the importance of its bridges and river crossing.

Jersey Park has been an exceptionally well-preserved, urban public park since its opening in 1925, the land having been gifted originally by the Earl of Jersey in 1908. Its original layout of formal and informal areas remains complete and includes sports facilities. Planting in the park is diverse and interesting, with an emphasis on evergreen trees and shrubs. The park is designated Grade II on the Cadw/ICOMOS Register of Parks and Gardens of Special Historic Interest in Wales.

Rhoddfa Clarke is the name of the inclined part of the South Wales Mineral Railway, the lowest, level part of which now forms Jersey Park. Here rope-hauled coal wagons delivered coal from Glyncorrwg to Briton Ferry dock. Above the dense matrix of streets and busy roads of Briton Ferry, the park and incline give access to Craig y Darren Woods and offers some respite from the town's traffic. This ancient woodland is crisscrossed by a network of footpaths offering congenial walks with dramatic views of the town and Swansea Bay.

== Sports clubs ==
- Briton Ferry Llansawel A.F.C.
- Briton Ferry RFC
- Briton Ferry Steel Cricket Club
- Briton Ferry Town Cricket Club

== Notable people ==
- Kenneth Crosby (1904–1998), linguist and missionary to Sierra Leone, West Africa, was born in Briton Ferry
- Sir Francis Avery Jones (1910–1998), a Welsh physician and gastroenterologist, born in Briton Ferry
- Harry Parr-Davies (1914–1955), musician, composer and songwriter, was born in Briton Ferry
- Mavis Nicholson (née Mainwaring) (1930-2022), journalist and broadcaster, was born in Briton Ferry where she spent her childhood
- David Pickering (born 1960), Welsh rugby personality, was born in Briton Ferry
- Alf Shea (1898–1969), Welsh cricketer, was born in Briton Ferry

== Nearby areas ==
- Crymlyn Burrows
- Llandarcy
- Neath
- Port Talbot
- Baglan
- Baglan Bay

== Twin towns ==
Briton Ferry is twinned with Ouagadougou, the capital of Burkina Faso.
