= Baglan, Neath Port Talbot =

Village in West Glamorgan, Wales

Baglan
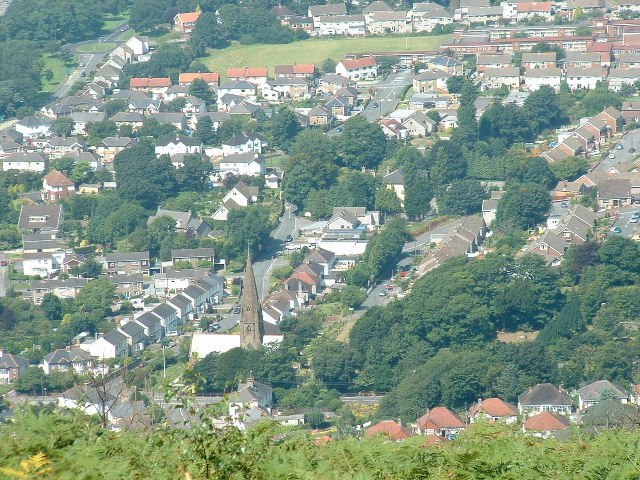

- Location within Neath Port Talbot
- Population: 6,819
- OS grid reference: SS746924
- Principal area: Neath Port Talbot
- Preserved county: West Glamorgan
- Country: Wales
- Sovereign state: United Kingdom
- Post town: PORT TALBOT
- Postcode district: SA12
- Dialling code: 01639
- Police: South Wales
- Fire: Mid and West Wales
- Ambulance: Welsh
- UK Parliament: Aberafan Maesteg
- Senedd Cymru – Welsh Parliament: Aberavon
- List of places UK Wales Neath Port Talbot 51.6166°N 3.8115°W Map of the community

Baglan is a village in Wales, adjoining Port Talbot, named after Saint Baglan. It is also a community and ward in the Neath Port Talbot county borough. In 2001, the population was 6,654. rising to 6,819 in 2011.

Baglan is on the side of a steep hill and surrounded by two hills, Mynydd-y-Gaer to the north and Mynydd Dinas to the east. The moors and Baglan Bay are to the southwest. The village contains a number of historical buildings such as Baglan House, St. Catharine's Church, and St. Baglan's Church. The first St. Baglan's Church is now a shell after a fire in 1954. St. Catharine's Church was designed by Welsh architect John Prichard, an exponent of the neo-Gothic style and dedicated in 1882. Baglan House was one of the seats of the Villiers family, earls of Jersey.

Baglan railway station is on the South Wales Main Line with trains to Cardiff and Swansea.

== Early history ==
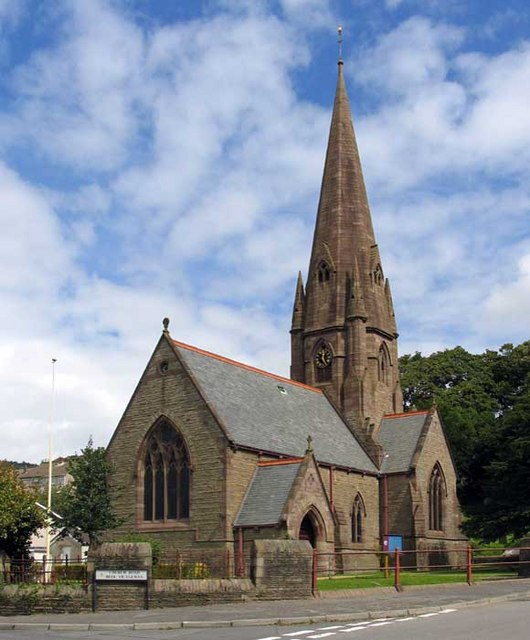
St Catharine, Baglan

The earliest evidence of settlement here dates back to the Bronze Age with there being a tumulus called Twyn Disgwylfa on Mynydd Dinas and a round barrow within the hillfort of Buarth-y-Gaer just outside the boundary of Baglan. An Iron Age hillfort, Craig Ty-Isaf, is situated on the surrounding hill, Mynydd-y-Gaer. The Roman road Via Julia very possibly passed through the village, although the statement that there was once a Roman milestone at the junction of Old Road and Albion Road Approach is erroneous (the milestone is actually from Pyle). Later, a Dark Age (Early Christian period) church was founded here, as can be seen from a few local Early Christian stones, especially the Cross of Brancu (dated 9th - 10th century) which is in the vestry of St Catharine's church. The inscription on the Cross of Brancu(f) could be a dedication to Brancuf, or reads as Brancu f(ecit). i.e. was made by Brancu or may be Brancu followed by a chi-rho monogram. (the name Brancu is preceded by a simple Latin cross in any case). According to tradition the church was founded by the aforementioned St Baglan.

In the medieval period, the church (dedicated to St Baglan) was rebuilt seemingly on the same site. The church burnt down in 1954 although ruins still exist at the top of the churchyard of St Catharine's church. There was a medieval castle, Plas Baglan, within the parish boundary. This castle sited above the Baglan Brook and is heavily overgrown. Although more usually thought of as a manor house than a castle, it is a "strongly fortified site, a castle rather than a moated site [...] a masonry castle that existed by the 13th century". It did, however, become a manor house and had literary associations in the 15th and 16th centuries. Several house platforms from the medieval period also exist on the hills behind the village.

== Sport ==
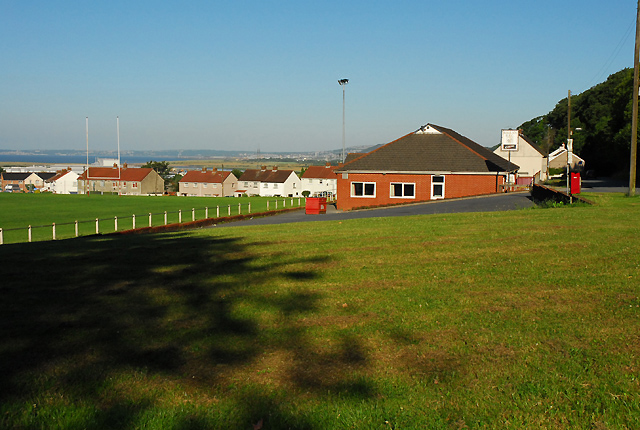
Baglan Rugby Football Club

Baglan is home to four sporting associations; Baglan Rugby Football Club, Baglan Dragons Football Club, Baglan Cricket Club. Also home to Tyn-Y-Twr Bowling Club, Captain Phillip Reese David.

== Notable people ==
- Michael Williams, who was created Baron Williams of Baglan, of Neath Port Talbot in Glamorgan on 23 July 2010.
- Comedian Rob Brydon was born in Baglan.
- Actor Michael Sheen grew up in the village.
- Comedian Lloyd Langford was born in the village

== See also ==
- Baglan Bay power station
- List of Scheduled Monuments in Neath Port Talbot
