= Port Talbot War Memorial =

War memorial in Wales

Coordinates: 51.5870°N 3.7722°W

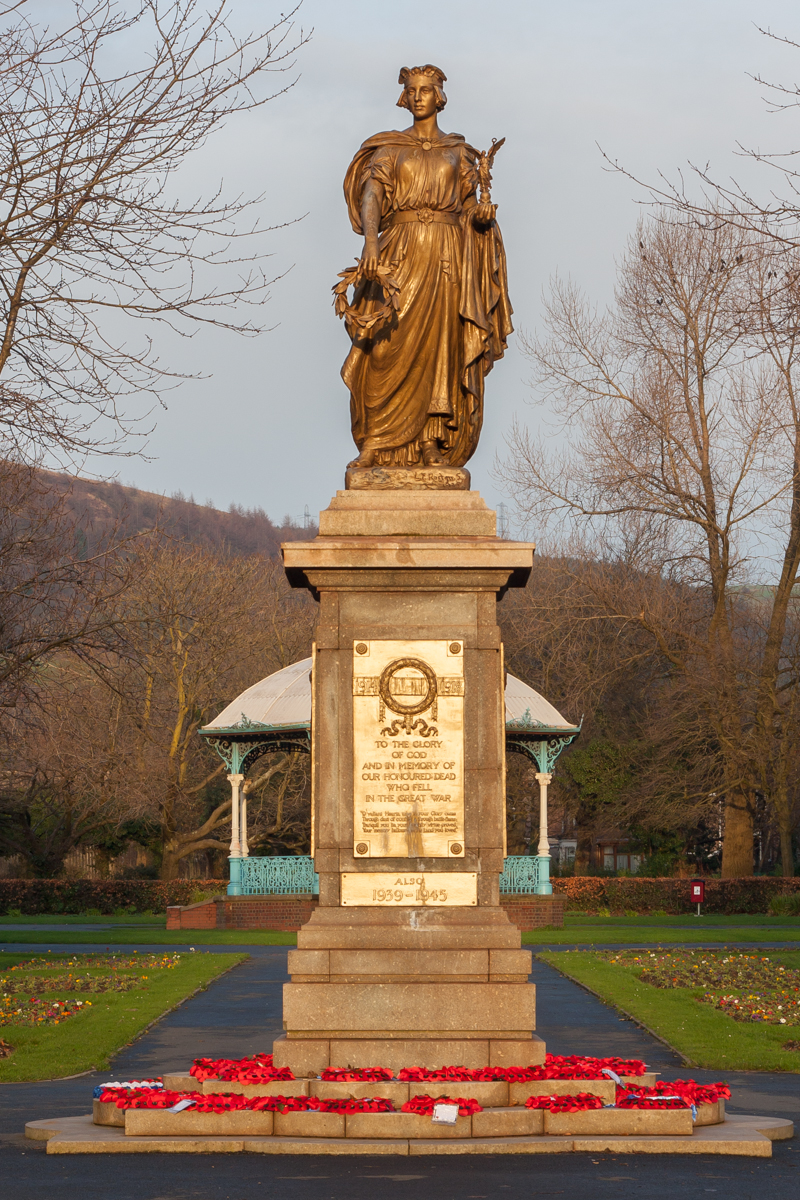
Port Talbot War Memorial

The war memorial at Port Talbot, Wales, commemorates local men killed in the First World War and Second World War. It is located in the Talbot Memorial Park, where it was erected in 1925; the names from the Second World War were added later. It was sculpted by Louis Frederick Roslyn, and was unveiled on 4 July 1925 by Sir William R. Robertson. The park in which it stands was donated to the town by Miss Emily Charlotte Talbot of Margam Castle, and opened to the public in 1926. The memorial has been Grade II* listed since the year 2000.

== The sculpture ==
The bronze sculpture represents the figure of Victory, in the form of an angel holding a wreath and a winged victory, with the name of the sculptor, L. F. Roslyn, inscribed on its base. It stands on a granite plinth, each side of which holds a bronze plaque with a different relief. The reliefs represent War, Peace and Remembrance.

== The park ==
The park is designated Grade II on the Cadw/ICOMOS Register of Parks and Gardens of Special Historic Interest in Wales. Its gates are dedicated to Rupert Price Hallowes VC MC. Hallowes, born in Surrey, moved to Port Talbot in 1910 and was employed at the Mansel Tinplate Works. He was killed on the Western Front in September 1915 and was posthumously awarded the Victoria Cross.
