= Mynydd y Gaer =

Hill in Bridgend County Borough in South Wales

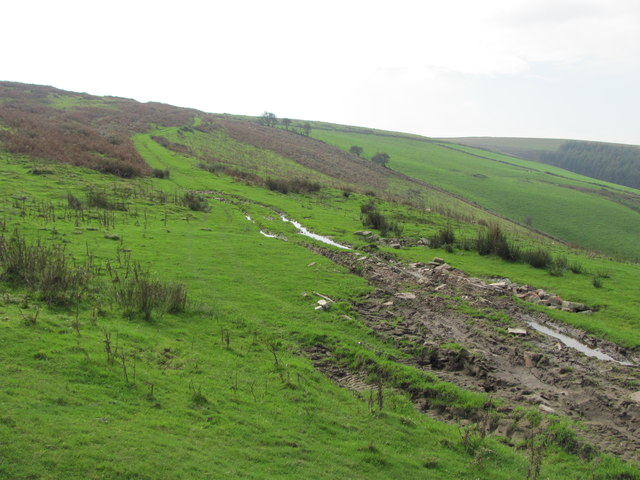
- Eastern slopes of Mynydd y Gaer

Highest point
- Elevation: 295 m (968 ft)
- Coordinates: 51.5617°N 3.5108°W

Naming
- English translation: hill of the fort
- Language of name: Welsh

Geography
- Location: Bridgend, Wales
- OS grid: SS 954858
- Topo map: OS Landranger 170 / Explorer 151

Mynydd y Gaer is a 295-metre-high hill in Bridgend County Borough in South Wales. The summit is crowned by a trig point.

It is reputed to be the site of Caradoc's fortress who in the first century AD resisted the Roman invasion of the Silures territories around 48-50 AD.

There is a Caer Caradoc tumulus at the eastern end of the mynydd which is still displayed on the OS maps that is, according to local legend, the burial place of Caradoc.

It is claimed the burial mounds of Meurig and Athwr II who resisted the Saxons in the 6th century are nearby.

== Geology ==
The hill is formed from sandstones of the Pennant Sandstone Formation assigned to the Warwickshire Group laid down late in the Carboniferous Period. The strata here dip moderately steeply northwards into the South Wales Coalfield syncline. A number of coal seams are recorded as outcropping on the hillside including the No 1 Rhondda, No 2 Rhondda, Brithdir and Brithdir Rider.

== Access ==
The upper parts of the hill are mapped as open access under the Countryside and Rights of Way Act 2000 and so open to public access on foot. A public footpath and a byway climb the southwest and southeast slopes of the hill respectively from a car park at the end of a minor road from the nearby village of Heol-y-Cyw. Both rights of way are followed by the Ogwr Ridgeway Walk. Two further public footpaths climb the hill’s northern slopes from the direction of Glynogwr.
