= Swansea NHS Trust =

Former NHS trust in Wales

Swansea NHS Trust was an NHS Trust covering Swansea, south Wales. It was established on 1 April 1999 and ceased to exist on 1 April 2008 when it merged with Bro Morgannwg NHS Trust to form the Abertawe Bro Morgannwg University NHS Trust (ABM). The trust managed nine hospitals and provides over 1,800 beds. In addition, it provided healthcare from number of community premises. Swansea NHS Trust was a designated university trust.

== Major Hospitals ==
=== General hospitals ===
- Morriston Hospital
- Singleton Hospital

=== Psychiatric ===
- Cefn Coed Hospital

=== Division of Medicine and Elderly Care ===
- Fairwood Hospital
- Garngoch Hospital
- Gellinudd Hospital
- Gorseinon Hospital
- Hill House Hospital

=== Community ===
- Clydach War Memorial Hospital, closed in 2015.
