= Radio City 1386AM =

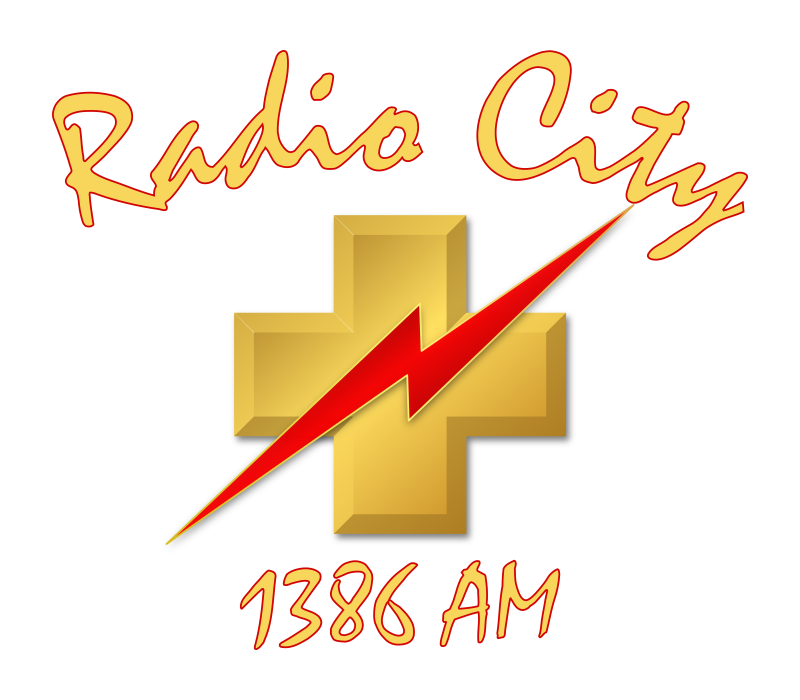
- Wales
- Broadcast area: Singleton Hospital in Swansea
- Frequency: AM: 1386

Programming
- Format: Hospital

History
- First air date: 1968

Links
- Website: www.radiocity1386am.co.uk

Radio City 1386AM - The Swansea Bay University Health Board's Radio Service is the Hospital Radio service based in Singleton Hospital, Swansea.

== About the service ==
Radio City 1386AM, is one of the longest running Hospital Radio stations in Wales. It produces chat and news programmes, as well as playing music to patients at Singleton Hospital in Swansea. It broadcasts on 1386AM (LPAM) and on channel no.4 (wards 1–12) and on channel no.12 (wards 14–20).

== History ==
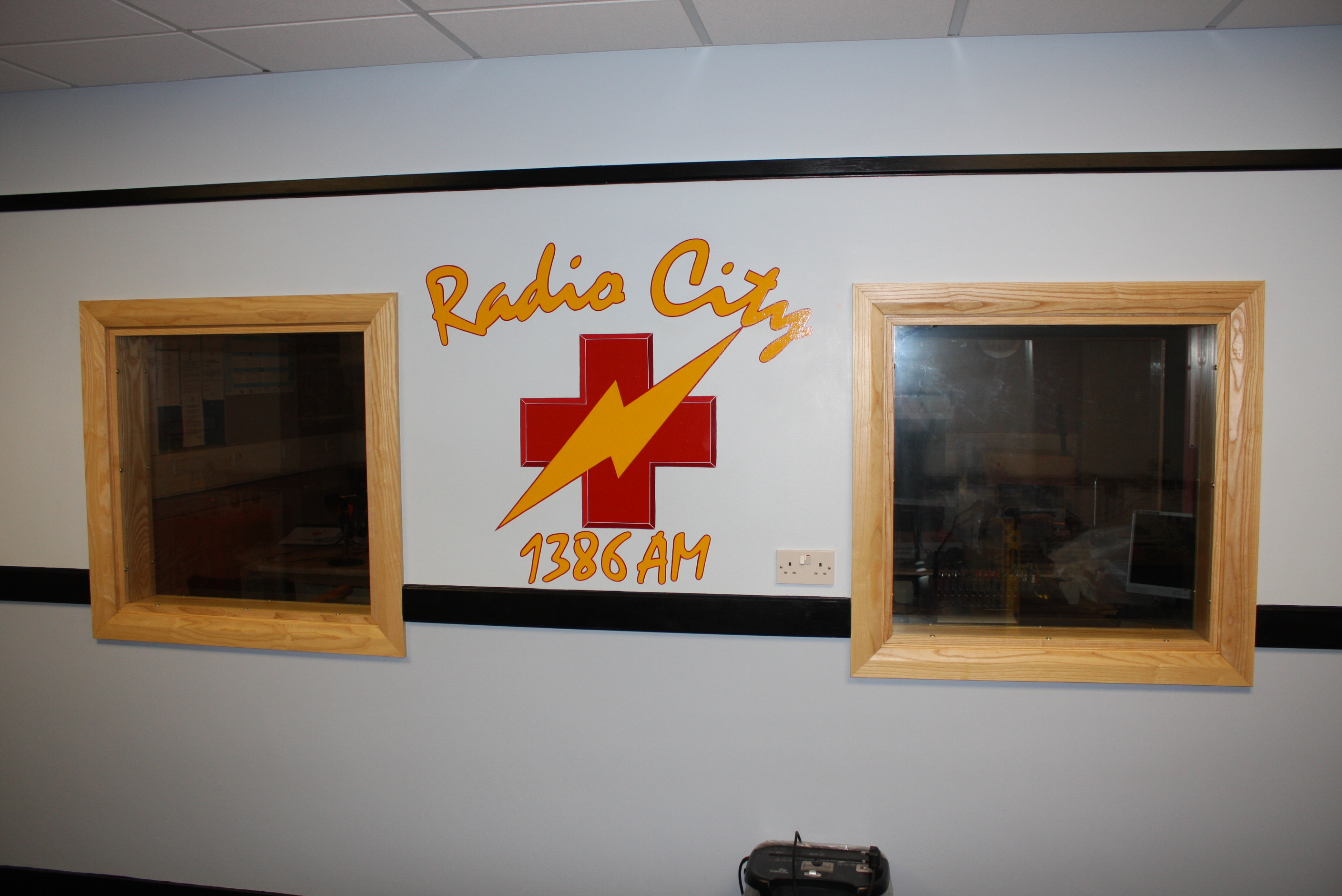
The reception area of Radio City 1386AM.

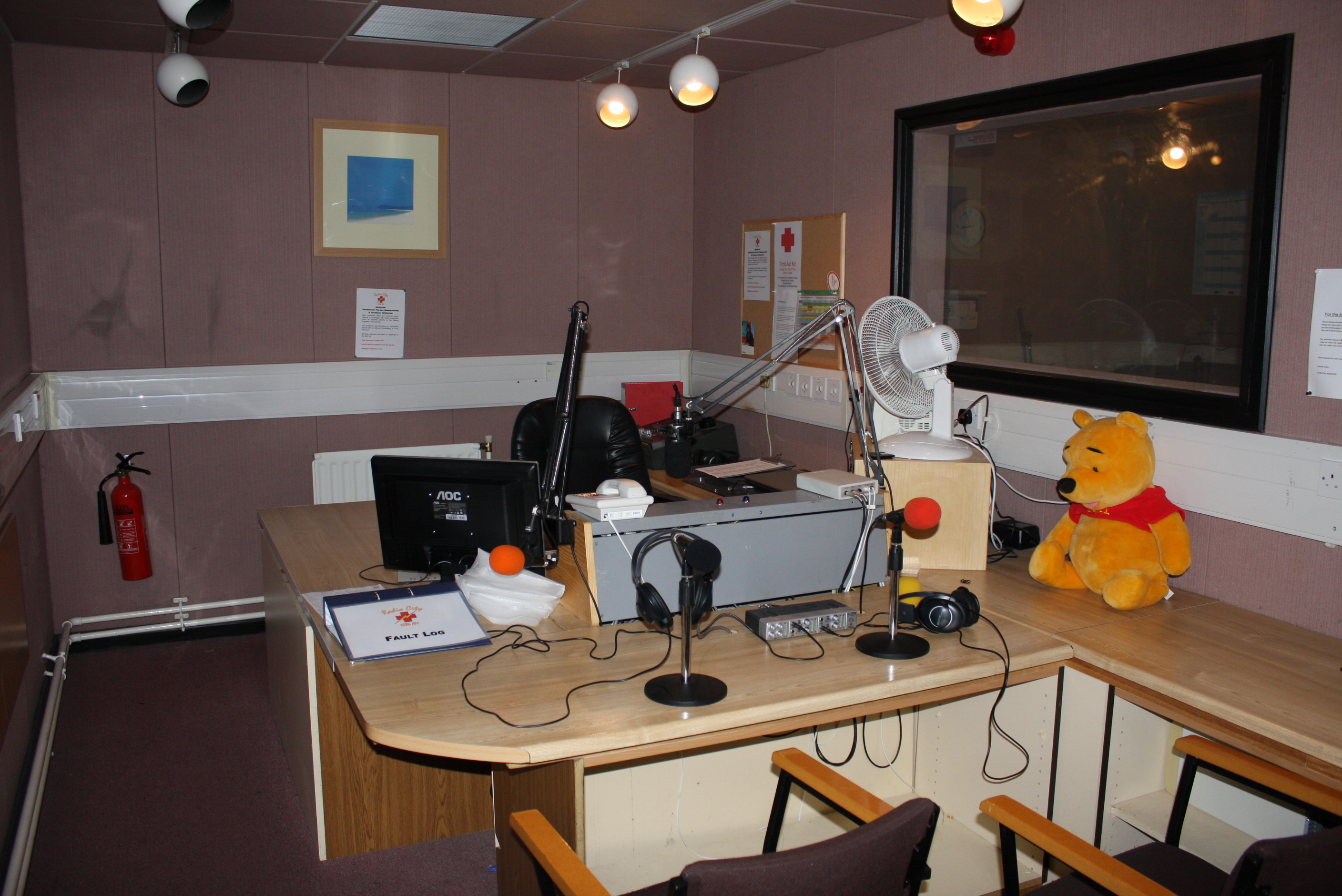
Studio 2, the main broadcast studio used by Radio City 1386AM

Radio City entrance

The Swansea Hospitals Radio service was founded on 1 August 1966 by Robert Rees, David Vaughan and Clive Thomas - three school friends who had been watching a television programme on radio in hospitals run by voluntary groups. The early programmes were recorded on tapes in people's houses including two of the initial DJs, Tim Richards and Tony Bowden.

On New Year's Eve 1966, the station was launched at Morriston Hospital on a three-month trial basis. Due to accommodation difficulties initially the station broadcast from the basement and temporary accommodation in the car park, broadcasts were restricted to only four hours on Saturdays and Sundays. Soon broadcasts were extended to include a Welsh language programme and all day broadcasting at weekends.

In 1968 a new studio at Singleton Hospital was opened which later became Radio City's base. The station at Morriston became a separate organisation, known as Radio LF.

Expansion followed with Mount Pleasant, Hill House, Cefn Coed Hospital, Gorseinon and Garngoch Hospitals all receiving programmes. The hospitals were linked using a network of telephone landlines, all of which became very expensive to maintain.

Due to the restructure of the Health Authority and the closure of some of the hospitals Radio City's broadcasts were concentrated on Singleton Hospital, without the need for expensive landline links.

In 1991 the old prefabricated studios, by now extremely dilapidated, were closed and broadcasts moved to smart new purpose-build facilities within the new wing of Singleton Hospital. £10,000 was raised to fit out a first studio to broadcast standard.

With the introduction of infection control and a squeeze on funding throughout the NHS, the provision of headphones became financially impossible, so that Radio City could continue broadcasting to patients £20,000 was raised through funding and donations to register a LPAM (Low Power AM) frequency, to coincide with the change of broadcasting Radio City 1386AM was launched.

Today, Radio City is broadcasting 24 hours a day, 7 days a week from its base in the maternity wing of Singleton Hospital via 1386AM, smart phone app and the internet. And now has a fully operational production studio, a broadcast studio and plan to build a multi purpose recording suite in the next few years.

== Record of achievements ==
World Record holders (21 August 1978) for pushing a standard hospital bed 3000 miles along the promenade in Swansea, though this was lost in 1979 to Bruntsfield Bedding Centre who achieved 3233 miles.

== Notable members ==
Roy Noble - Current Patron of the service. Broadcaster and Journalist for BBC Radio Wales.
Amanda Sergeant - Newsreader. Part of GMTV until 2008.
Jason Mohammad - Newsreader and Presenter. BBC Wales Today and Wales on Saturday.
Mathew Johnson - Programme Director. Dubai Eye 103.8
Mark Buckley - Presenter. BBC Radio Wales & GTFM
Chris Harper - Presenter. Swansea Sound and Beacon Radio
Clive Thomas - The Late President and founder of the service. Presenter for Radio Caroline
