= Dan Danino =

Welsh thoracic surgeon (1911–1998)

- Born: 12 February 1911; Gibraltar
- Died: 22 August 1998 (aged 87); Morriston, Wales
- Education: St Bartholomew's Hospital
- Known for: Consultant physician
- Awards: CBE (1977), MRCS LRCP (1934), MB BS Lond (1934), MD (1937), MRCP (1937), DA (1938), FRCP (1968)
- Scientific career
- Fields: Medicine
- Workplaces: Morriston Hospital; Singleton Hospital; St Bartholomew's Hospital; London Chest Hospital; Cardiff Royal Infirmary

Emmanuel Andrew Danino CBE FRCP (12 February 1911 – 22 August 1998) was a British consultant physician at Morriston Hospital, and Singleton Hospital, which are hospitals of the Swansea Bay University Health Board.

== Career ==
In 1928, Danino started training at St Bartholomew's Hospital where he qualified in 1934. He worked there as a house physician and obstetric house surgeon, and junior non-resident anaesthetist. In 1937, he qualified as a Doctor of Medicine, became a Member of the Royal College of Physicians of the United Kingdom and joined the London Chest Hospital as a house physician.

In 1938, he received a diploma in anaesthetics and joined Cardiff Royal Infirmary as a resident medical officer. During World War II he was in charge of emergency medical services in Whitchurch, Cardiff and later at Morriston Hospital. In 1943, he joined the Royal Army Medical Corps becoming a lieutenant colonel and overseeing military hospitals in India and Malaya.

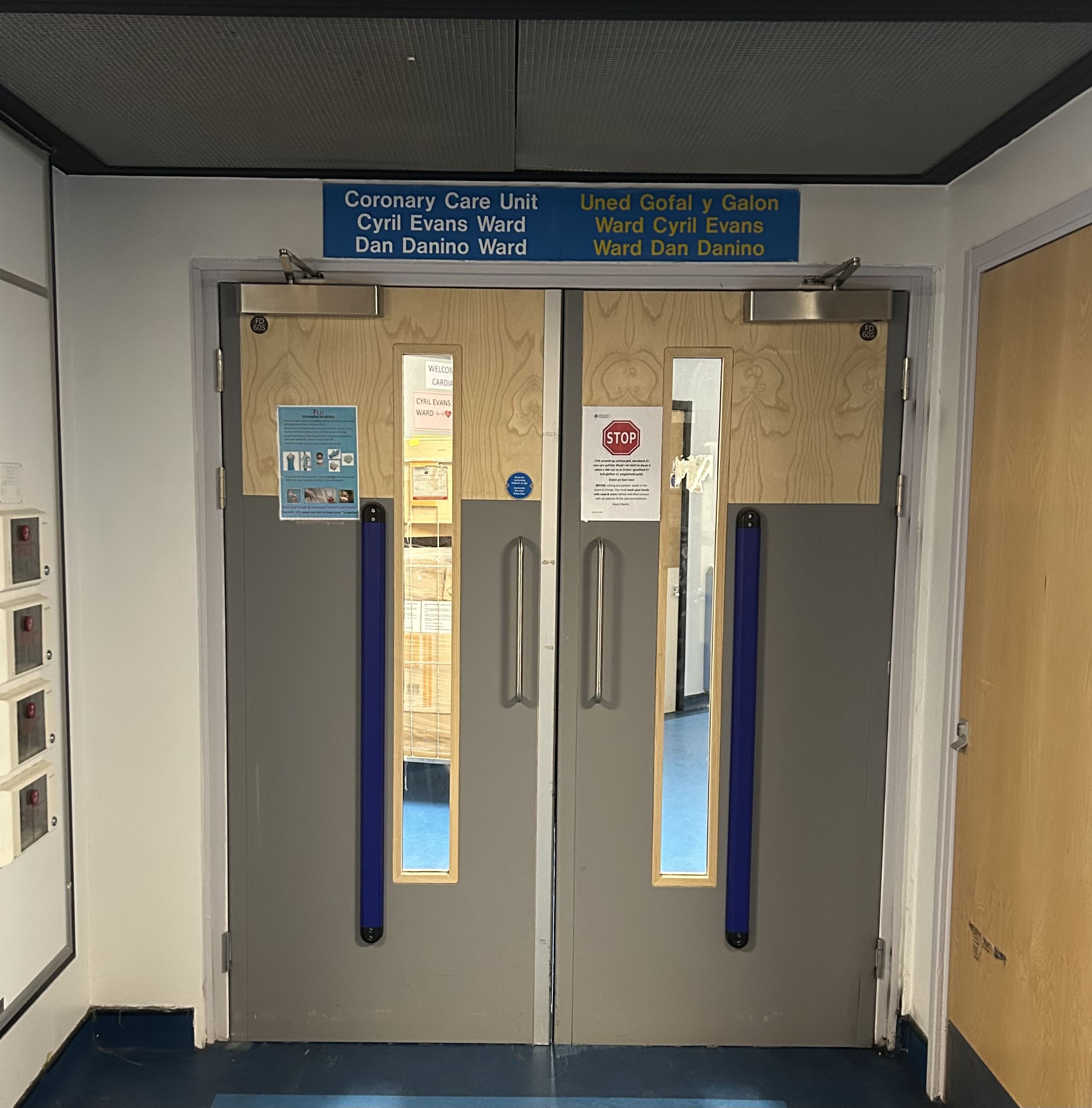
Entrance to the Dan Danino and Cyril Evans Wards of the Coronary Care Unit, Morriston Hospital

In 1947, he became sole consultant physician at Morriston Hospital, providing medical coverage for 400 beds, including the casualty, general surgery, orthopaedic surgery, and obstetric and gynaecology departments. He also gave cover to the neurological service until a consultant neurologist was appointed in 1966. With Cyril John Evans he helped establish the Cardiothoracic Centre at Morriston Hospital. His main interest was in cardiorespiratory disease, which was relevant to the mining communities of South Wales. His gifts as a teacher made him popular with students who were keen to train with him. In 1968, he became a Fellow of the Royal College of Physicians and joined Singleton Hospital as a consultant physician when it was completed that year.

== Retirement ==
In 1976, he retired from practice, and in 1977, he was appointed Commander of the Most Excellent Order of the British Empire (CBE) for services to medicine. He served as an independent councillor on the City and County of Swansea Council for three years and was a medical adviser to the Driver and Vehicle Licensing Agency located at Clase, near Morriston. He was considered to have a brilliant intellect and inspired loyalty in those who worked with him. He died on 22 August 1998, aged 87, in Morriston, from Parkinson's disease.

A residential road in Morriston has been named in his honour and a hospital ward at Morriston Hospital has been named after him.
