= Bro Morgannwg NHS Trust =

Former NHS trust in Wales

Bro Morgannwg NHS Trust was an NHS Trust based in Bridgend, Mid Glamorgan.

== History ==
The Chairman was Win Griffiths, and the Chief Executive was Paul Williams. The Trust served around 300,000 people, living in Neath, Port Talbot, Bridgend, and part of the Vale of Glamorgan (the Welsh name for which forms the trust's name). It employed around 6,600 staff including more than 100 Consultants. It managed around 1,400 beds across 14 general and community hospitals. It ceased to exist as a distinct entity following a merger with Swansea NHS Trust on 1 April 2008 to form the Abertawe Bro Morgannwg University NHS Trust.

== Major hospitals ==
Major hospitals were as follows:

- Glanrhyd Hospital
- Groeswen Hospital, closed in 2006.
- Maesteg Community Hospital
- Neath Port Talbot Hospital
- The Princess of Wales Hospital
- Tonna Hospital

== Health centres ==
- Pontardawe Health Centre
