= Kingstown Radio =

Coordinates: 53.744412°N 0.358271°W

- England
- Broadcast area: Kingston upon Hull
- Frequencies: 1350 kHz and Hospedia

Programming
- Format: Hospital Radio

Ownership
- Owner: Hull and East Yorkshire Hospitals NHS Trust

History
- First air date: 16 July 1961

Links
- Website: http://www.kingstownradio.co.uk

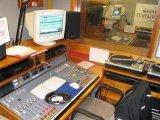
Basic hospital radio studio

Kingstown Radio was a hospital radio station founded in 1961 and based in Kingston upon Hull, England, broadcasting on 1350 kHz (AM) for the last twenty three years of its life, to patient's bedside Hospedia systems and via the local NHS intranet across the Hull and East Yorkshire NHS Trust. It was a registered charity. Broadcasting music, news, sport and health information to staff and patients, its Hull City live commentaries were particularly popular beyond its usual audiences, alongside BBC Radio Humberside it was the only station broadcasting these games live.

Former volunteer presenters include Jon Culshaw, a popular comedian, and James Hoggarth, who later joined BBC Radio Humberside and more recently became their music editor.

The station has been at more than one site during its history, but for many years, Kingstown Radio was based at Hull Royal Infirmary, sharing a building with flats for nurses and doctors upstairs from the studio. However in 2021, the studio building was pulled down with short notice of only a few weeks; the station ceased broadcasting and attempts to find new premises proved fruitless.

== Backpage Sport ==
"Backpage Sport" was the name of a sports magazine programme which aired in the 1990s on Tyne Tees Television and is also the name of Manx Radio's sports programme.

== Achievements ==
In 2007, Kingstown Radio won the Silver Award for Sports Output, and four commendations for presentation and production at the Hospital Broadcasting Awards, held in Northampton, particularly for its coverage of Hull City home matches presented by Louise Pitts and Stuart Miles.

== See also ==
- Hospital Broadcasting Association
