= Radio Brockley =

Hospital radio station

Radio Brockley was founded in 1966 to provide a hospital radio station for the patients of the Royal National Orthopaedic Hospital in Stanmore, North West London.

The station was named Radio Brockley after the hill on which the hospital is situated. The 4 founder members were Mike Alinek, Barry Cobden, Ian Downs and Mike Solomons who were assisted by 2 others. All 6 had previously volunteered at Radio Edgware, another hospital radio based at the nearby Edgware General Hospital.

The station was opened by the local Member of Parliament Roy Roebuck in October 1966.

Radio Brockley is London's longest continually running hospital radio service and has won many awards, including the Hospital Broadcasting Association "Station Of The Year" in 2016, 2018 and 2020. It is a member of the Hospital Broadcasting Association, is registered as a Charity in England and Wales and is run entirely by volunteers.
