= Roy Noble =

British broadcaster

Roy Noble CBE DL KStJ Rotary Fellow
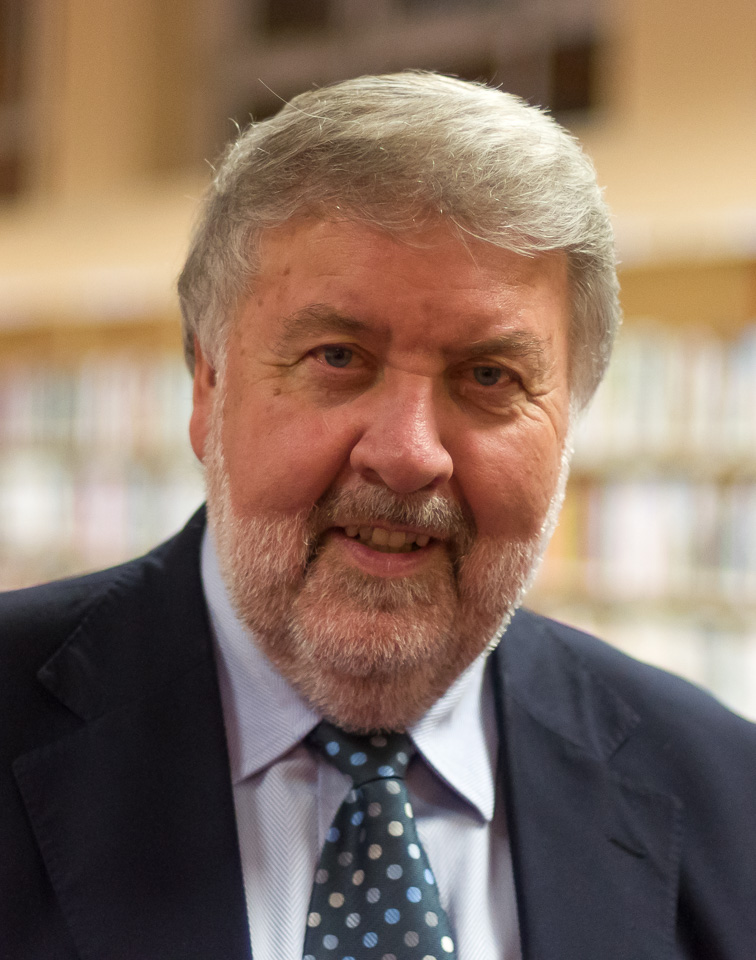
- Roy Noble at an event at Rhydyfelin library
- Born: 1942 (age 83–84); Brynamman, Ammanford, Carmarthenshire, Wales
- Occupations: Educator broadcaster writer
- Known for: BBC Radio Wales
- Spouse: Elaine
- Children: 1
- Website: BBC profile

Roy Noble CBE DL KStJ Rotary Fellow (born 1942) is a Welsh radio and television broadcaster, writer and Bevan Commissioner.

== Biography ==
Noble was born and raised in Brynamman in the Amman Valley of Carmarthenshire, the only son of coal miner Ivor Noble and his wife Sadie. After passing his 11 Plus entrance examination he attended Amman Valley Grammar School, where fellow pupils included rugby union administrator and barrister Vernon Pugh and John Cale, of the Velvet Underground.

On finishing school, he tried to join the RAF as he had always wanted to be a pilot, but was turned down because he suffers from hay fever. He trained as a teacher at Cardiff Training College, where he was the President of the Students’ Union in his final year.

=== Teaching career ===
Noble first taught in England, before returning to South Wales; latterly he was Head Teacher of two primary schools in the County of Powys; Ysgol Thomas Stephens, at Pontneddfechan, near Glynneath, and Llangattock Primary School, at Llangattock, near Crickhowell. Noble won a scholarship to go to Germany and the US to visit and compare schools.

=== Broadcasting career ===
Noble's move to broadcasting was gradual and part-time, writing and presenting a weekly "Letter from Aberdare" monologue for the A.M. programme on BBC Radio Wales. He eventually joined the BBC in Wales full-time in 1985, and went on to present weekday magazine shows for Radio Wales for 27 years, winning high audience figures and a 1999 Sony Award.

Television appearances have included a diet programme with Barbara Dickson and a series of Noble Guides covering many subjects from Paris to "Manliness and Mortality". The popular Noble Trails series also covered a journey along the "Celtic Rim" of Europe and more recently his series, Common Ground was highly acclaimed gaining him the Royal Television Society Award as Regional Presenter of the Year in 2000. He was a regular co-presenter on the Welsh language evening magazine programme Heno (Tonight) for seven years. He also completed a Welsh language television series for S4C, touring the Valleys of South Wales on a Honda Gold Wing trike. He also appeared in a Welsh comedy series and as a new character in the Welsh long running series Pobol y Cwm.

=== Writing career ===
Noble's publications include: 'Bachan Noble' (Welsh Language Autobiography); 'Roy Noble's Welsh Nicknames'; 'Noble Thoughts'; 'Noble Ways'; 'Lay-bys in my Life' (an autobiography); 'Down the Road and Round the Bend' (tales of Wales); 'Fact, Fiction and Fanciful Walking with Bamps' (children's book); 'The Be Team' (children's book)

=== Charity and other works ===
Noble was Chairman of the Wales Youth Agency from 1998 to 2001. In the 2001 Queens Birthday Honours List, he was awarded an OBE for services to the community and for charity support in Wales.

He was appointed as Brother in the Venerable Order of Saint John in 2000, being appointed as Officer of St.John Cymru Wales in 2002, Commander in 2011 and a Knight of Grace in 2016.

Noble was appointed a commissioner with the Bevan Commission with real responsibilities in the Health and Care sectors in Wales as an independent 'think tank' for the Welsh Government.

He was also made a Fellow of UWIC (University of Wales Institute, Cardiff, now [Cardiff Metropolitan University]) and a Paul Harris Fellow with Rotary International. In 2007, he became a Deputy Lieutenant of the County of Mid Glamorgan and was promoted to Vice Lord Lieutenant in 2012. He retired from the post in 2017. In 2008 he was accepted into the National Eisteddfod of Wales 'Gorsedd y Beirdd' (Bardic Circle).

In 2009 he was awarded the Chancellor's Medal at the University of Glamorgan (now the University of South Wales) for his contribution to the educational and cultural life of Wales and his commitment to its people, in particular to those in need. In 2012, Noble was asked by the Minister of Education and Skills at the Welsh Government to chair a group looking into the future of the Welsh National Eisteddfod. The group completed its remit and reported back in October 2013.

In 2011 Noble cut the ribbon officially opening the 'Big Pit Branchline' at the Pontypool & Blaenavon Railway.

Noble was asked to be the Patron of the Senghenydd Mining Disaster 100th Anniversary Memorial Appeal, the memorial being unveiled on 14 October 2013. He acted as narrator of the 'tale of Senghenydd,’ detailing the two explosions at the Universal Pit, and the loss of life that resulted.

Noble was Ambassador for Wales of the WRVS (now RVS) Diamond Champions scheme, initiated by the Duchess of Cornwall to Honour Her Majesty The Queen, in the year of her Diamond Jubilee. He acted as a judge at the Diamond Champions event at St James's Palace that year.

Nobles has appeared as an after-dinner speaker at many organisations, clubs, and societies, including engagements in Hong Kong, Singapore, Dubai and Canada. He was a patron of the appeal leading to the establishment of a permanent 'Red Dragon' Bronze Memorial at Passchendaele, which was unveiled in August 2014. In 2017 he hosted the 100th Anniversary Commemoration ceremony of the Battle of Passchendaele at the battlefield site in Flanders.

He is currently the Patron for Radio City 1386AM, the ABM University Health Board's radio service based in Singleton Hospital, Swansea.

=== Personal life ===
For the past 30 years, Noble and his wife Elaine have lived in the village of Llwydcoed near the town of Aberdare in the Cynon Valley. The couple have one son, Richard.

=== Awards ===
In the 2024 Birthday Honours, Roy Noble was appointed a Commander of the Order of the British Empire (CBE) for services to Welsh culture and language and to the community in Wales.
