= St Lawrence's Hospital =

St Lawrence's Hospital may refer to:

- Hospital of St Lawrence, Acton
- St Lawrence's Hospital, Bodmin
- St Lawrence's Hospital, Caterham
- St Lawrence Hospital, Chepstow
