= Tim Briggs =

Tim Briggs may refer to:

- Tim Briggs (politician) (born 1970), American lawyer and politician
- Tim Briggs (surgeon) (born 1957), British orthopaedic surgeon
