= Hospital Radio Plymouth =

Coordinates: 50.4162°N 04.1141°W

- England
- Broadcast area: Derriford Hospital(Plymouth)
- Frequencies: FM: 107.3 MHz; DAB: 9C
- RDS: HOSPITAL, H R P (DAB)

Programming
- Format: Hospital

Ownership
- Owner: –

History
- First air date: 1969

Hospital Radio Plymouth is a hospital radio station based in Plymouth, England. It provides entertainment to the patients of Derriford Hospital broadcasting via the internet and on 107.3fm. The station holds a long term restricted service licence granted by Ofcom, allowing it to broadcast on FM.

The station is run as a charity staffed by volunteers (registered charity number 260238).

== History ==
During the 1950s, Plymouth Argyle commentary was broadcast to the patients of Plymouth hospitals by the Toc H Organisation, via the telephone network. In 1967, requests began to be collected from Mount Gould Hospital by the Plymouth Lions Club, forming the basis of the first weekly music programme, Disc Date. On 2 October 1969, the station secured its first permanent premises on the Barbican and was officially opened as Hospital Radio Plymouth by Alderman George Creber, the then Lord Mayor. From 1969 to 1998, the station was housed at the Ladies' Hospital on Lockyer Street; Nelson Gardens; Greenbank Hospital and Freedom Fields Hospital. In 1998 it moved to Derriford Hospital. In November 2016 Hospital Radio Plymouth moved to new premises at Bircham House. In May 2025 they moved back onto the hospital campus at Derriford Hospital, Plymouth.

== Programming ==
Hospital Radio Plymouth now broadcasts 24 hours a day, 365 days a year, with over 60 hours of live programming every week. This consists of a mix of specialist music programmes; request shows live from the hospital wards; news programmes; speech based shows; classic comedy and sport. Patients can make requests directly to the studio from their mobile phones using an app or via the website. The station broadcasts live from Home Park with match day commentary on 107.3fm around the hospital site. Plymouth Argyle home matches are presented on Argyle Live.

The station reaches out to the local community and can provide live entertainment and music. Recent events include Plymouth Hoe Bonfire Night, Music of The Night and The Lord Mayor's Day Parade.

== Awards ==
Bristol was the host for the 2014 HBA Awards. Andrew Hill scooped Bronze as Male Presenter of the Year. HRP was named Station Of The Year for the 4th time. The 2013 awards were held in Blackpool and Cover Me won the bronze in the Specialist Music section. Sally Box was given the Silver Award in the Speech section for her reading of the book Casper The Commuting Cat. Rachel Dodd won the Gold Award for Newcomer of the Year. At the 2012 Hospital Broadcasting Association awards, Hospital Radio Plymouth Won the Station of the year for the 3rd Time, Sophie Nevile took Silver in best Female presenter of the year. Hospital Radio Plymouth also made history with their award win. They were the first station to win or take runner up in the station of the year category five years in a row.

Also in 2011 Hospital Radio Plymouth was awarded The Queens Award in Voluntary Service.

At the 2011 Hospital Broadcasting Association awards, Hospital Radio Plymouth won the coveted Gold award in the Station of the Year category, Keith Jolley's behind Motown series won best specialist music programme, Kieren Crowhurst won HBA Voulenteer of the year and Andrew Hill took Bronze in best Male Presenter.

At the 2010 Hospital Broadcasting Association awards, the station won the Silver Award in the Station of the Year category; the Bronze Award for Best Station Promotion and was commended for Best Speech Package.

At the 2009 Inspiring Volunteering Awards held in Plymouth, the station was named as Volunteer Team of The Year.

At the 2009 Hospital Broadcasting Association awards, several Hospital Radio Plymouth volunteers were honoured. Josh Andrews was named HBA Volunteer of the Year, Josie Scobling received the silver award for Best Speech Package, Isobel King received a Highly Commended Award for Best Female Presenter and Josh Andrews was commended for Best Newcomer. The station won a Silver Award in the Station of the Year category.

At the 2008 Hospital Broadcasting Association awards, station volunteer Connal Cather received the John Whitney Lifetime Achievement Award for his service to the station since 1970. The station received the gold award as Station of the Year.

== Presenters ==
Previous presenters have included Phil Easton (City Radio Liverpool)., Nick Robins (BBC Radio Merseyside).

Current presenters can be found on the organisation's website.
