= Royal National Orthopaedic Hospital =

Coordinates: 51.632°N 0.305°W

- Royal National Orthopaedic Hospital NHS Trust
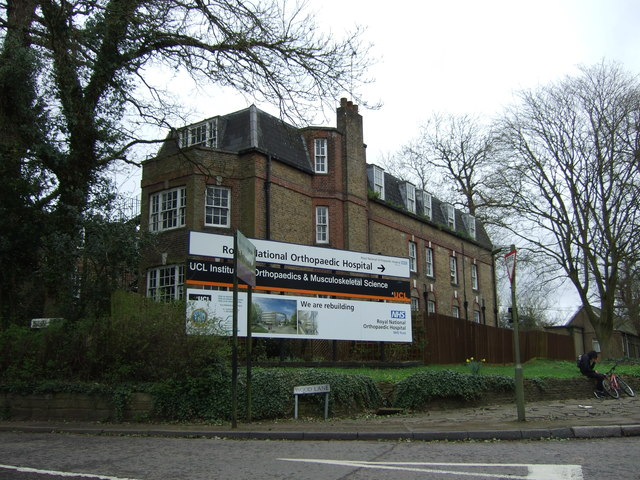
- The hospital's main site in Stanmore

- Shown in Harrow

Geography
- Location: Stanmore, London, England

Organisation
- Care system: National Health Service
- Type: Specialist
- Affiliated university: University College London

Services
- Emergency department: No
- Beds: 220
- Speciality: Orthopaedic surgery

History
- Founded: August 1905; 121 years ago

Links
- Website: www.rnoh.nhs.uk

The Royal National Orthopaedic Hospital (RNOH) is a specialist orthopaedic hospital located in Stanmore in the London Borough of Harrow, run by the Royal National Orthopaedic Hospital NHS Trust. It provides the most comprehensive range of neuro-musculoskeletal health care in the UK, including acute spinal injury, complex bone tumour treatment, orthopaedic medicine and specialist rehabilitation for chronic back pain. The RNOH is a major teaching centre and around 20% of orthopaedic surgeons in the UK receive training there.

== History ==
The hospital was established by way of a merger of the Royal Orthopaedic Hospital (founded in 1840 and based in Hanover Square) and the National Orthopaedic Hospital (founded in 1836 and based in Great Portland Street) in August 1905. The City Orthopaedic Hospital (founded in 1851 and based in Hatton Garden) joined the merger in 1907.

New facilities for the merged entities were built on Great Portland Street and were opened by King Edward VII in July 1909. During the First World War, the hospital in Great Portland Street became an emergency hospital for the military and from early 1918 also accommodated discharged disabled soldiers. The Great Portland Street site continued to accommodate short-term in-patients after the war.

In 1922, the hospital management acquired the Mary Wardell Convalescent Home for Scarlet Fever in Stanmore and established its country branch there. The Duke of Gloucester laid the foundation stone for a major extension at the Stanmore site shortly thereafter. The Stanmore site started to accommodate long-term in-patients at this time. In April 1979, the Prince of Wales opened a Rehabilitation Assessment Unit at the Stanmore site, built with funds raised by the British Motor Racing Drivers Association in memory of Graham Hill who had once been a patient of the hospital. In March 1984, the Princess of Wales opened a spinal injuries unit at the Stanmore site. Later that year, the lease on the building in Great Portland Street ended and services were transferred to the Stanmore site.

The Royal National Orthopaedic Hospital has had a central London out-patients clinic on Bolsover Street in Marylebone since 1909; the old facility closed in 2006 and a completely re-built facility opened on Bolsover Street in 2009.

In 2016, Norman Sharp, a 91-year-old British man, was recognised as having the world's oldest hip replacement implants. The two vitallium implants had been implanted at the Royal National Orthopaedic Hospital in November 1948. The 67-year-old implants had such an unusually long life, partly because they had not required the typical replacement of such implants, but also because of Mr Sharp's young age of 23 when they were implanted, owing to a childhood case of septic arthritis.

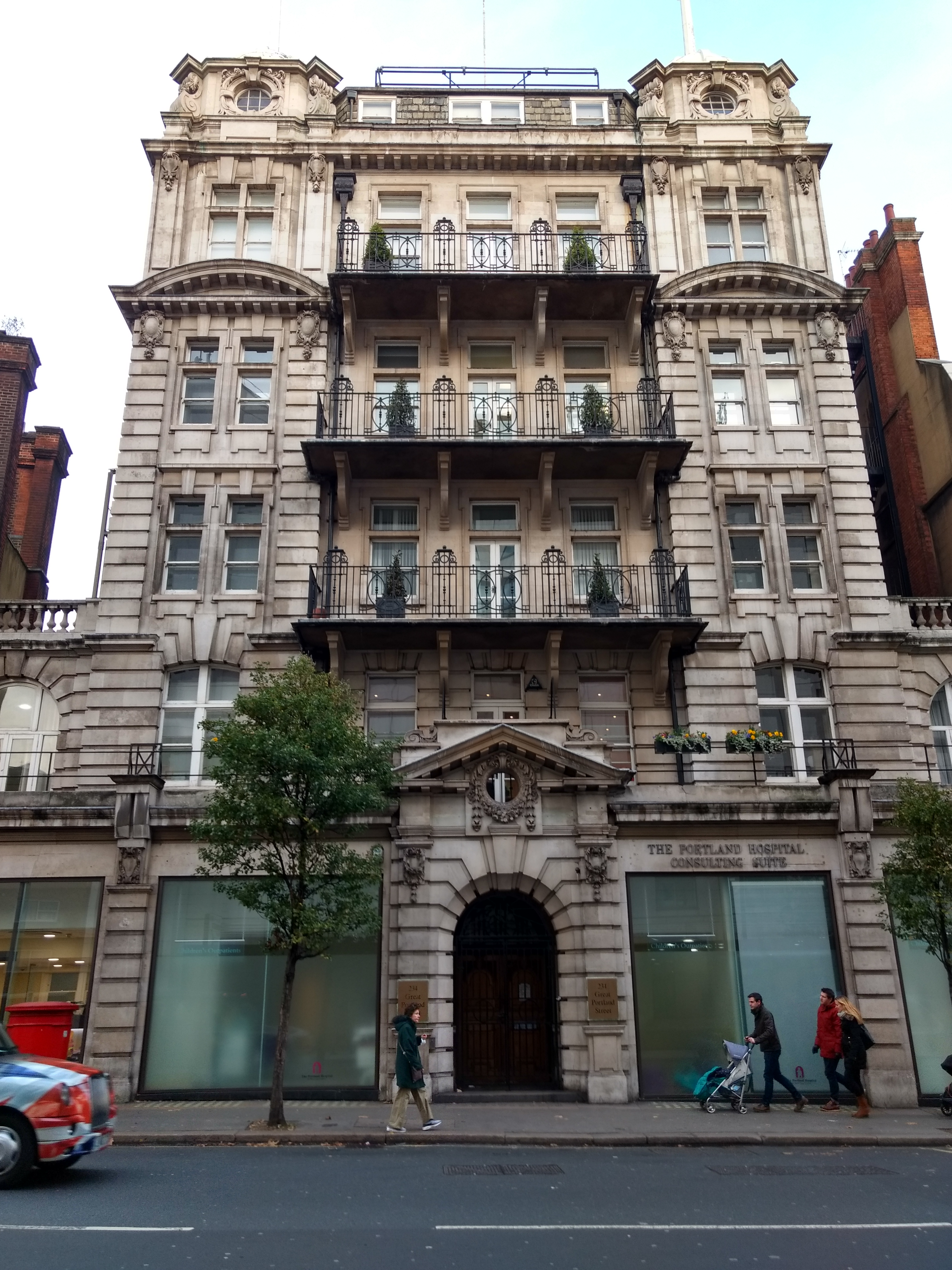
The former Great Portland Street site (1909–1984)

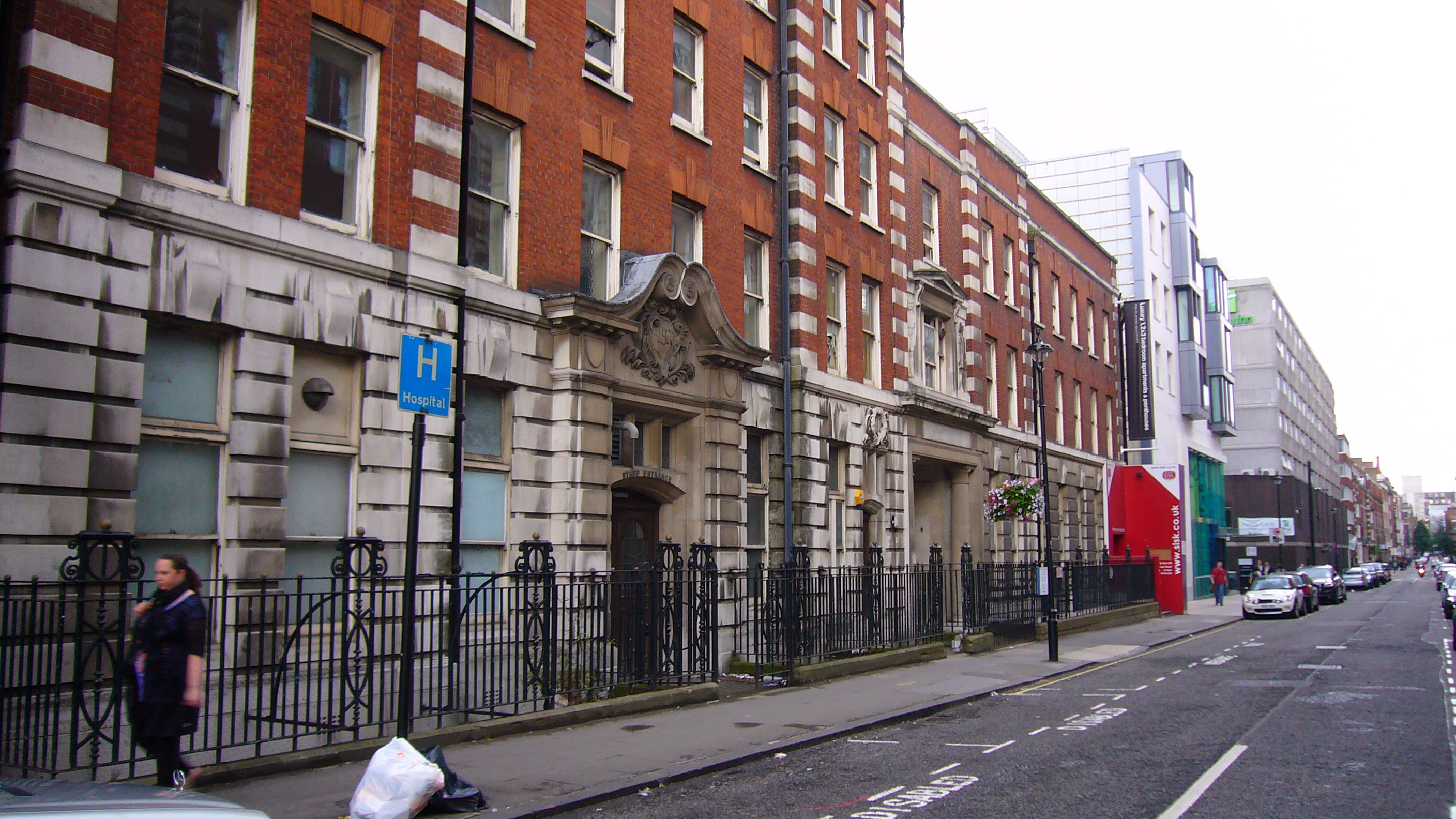
The former Bolsover Street out-patients clinic (1909–2006)

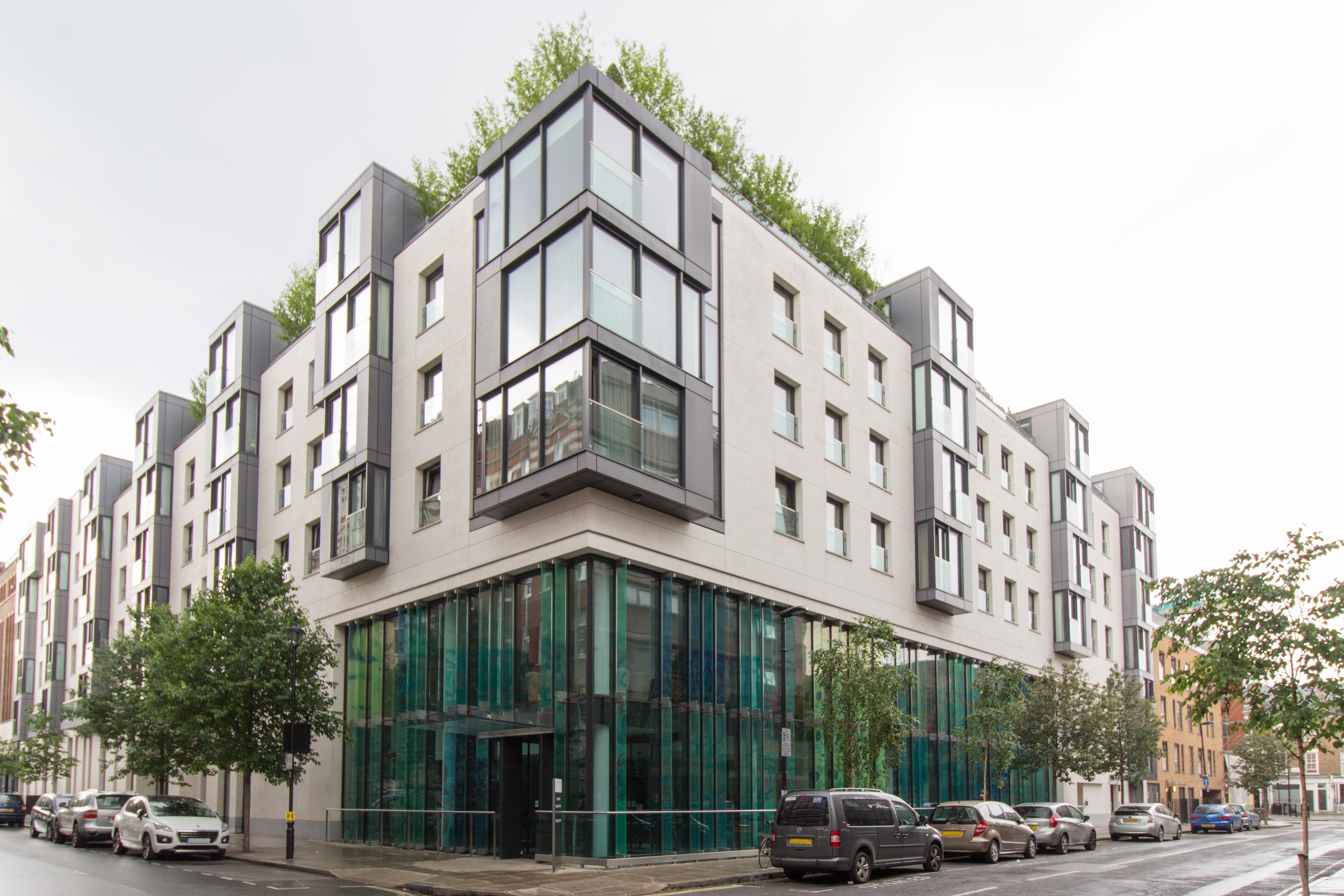
The current Bolsover Street out-patients clinic

== Services ==
As a national centre of excellence, the RNOH treats patients from across the country, many of whom have been referred by other hospital consultants for second opinions or for treatment of complex or rare conditions.

It broadcasts a hospital radio called Radio Brockley.

== Performance ==
It was named by the Health Service Journal as one of the top hundred NHS trusts to work for in 2015. At that time, it had 1310 full-time equivalent staff and a sickness absence rate of 2.88%. 87% of staff recommend it as a place for treatment and 71% recommended it as a place to work.

It expects to lose £15.2m in income, 11% of its turnover during 2016–17 under changes to the NHS tariff, more than a 25% of what it received last year for inpatient work. In 2014, the Care Quality Commission recorded the hospital as requiring improvement.

== Notable staff ==
- Sir Herbert Seddon (1903–1977), orthopaedic surgeon and author of Surgical Disorders of the Peripheral Nerves
- Audrey Smith (1915–1981), cryobiologist
- David Trevor (1905–1987), orthopaedic surgeon
- John Cholmeley (1902–1995), orthopaedic surgeon
- James Noel Chalmers Barclay (Ginger) Wilson (1919–2006), orthopaedic surgeon
- Rainer Campbell-Connolly (1919–2009), neuro-surgeon
- Professor Tim Briggs, orthopaedic surgeon, Creator of the Getting It Right First Time (GIRFT) initiative and National Director for Clinical Improvement and Elective Recovery

== Notable nursing staff ==
By 1899 the Royal Orthopaedic Hospital had a poor reputation, and Eva Luckes, Matron of The London Hospital was asked to inspect it and write a report about the problems. The hospital's sanitation had been unsatisfactory for much of the decade and there was outbreaks of diphtheria and scarlet fever amongst the patients, which led to the hospital temporarily closing for remedial building works. Luckes's report suggested changes to the nursing and housekeeping departments, and stressed the need to employ a competent trained matron with good management skills. The hospital governors accepted Luckes's recommendation that one of her ward sisters should be employed to reorganise the hospital. For the next thirty three years the hospital (and the subsequently merged orthopaedic hospitals) was almost continuously run by matrons who had trained at The London, under Eva Luckes.

- Lucy Wilson Wa[l]msley OBE (1871–1947), Matron 1900–1901. Walmsley became matron of the Royal Victoria Infirmary Newcastle, and a Principal Matron of the Territorial Force Nursing Service, before becoming a Local Government Board Inspector.
- Mary Eliza Pinsent, Royal Red Cross (1868–1960), Ward Sister from 1900 to 1903, Assistant Matron / Acting Matron from 1904 to 1906, and Matron from 1906 to 1933. She had leave of absence from 1914 to 1919 and served as Matron in the Territorial Force Nursing Service and Queen Alexandra's Imperial Military Nursing Service (Reserve).
- Gertrude 'Caroline' Waddingham, Royal Red Cross, Second class (1869–1946), was Assistant Matron for nearly 20 years. Waddingham worked at the hospital from 1906 until she retired in 1931. She was a Sister until 1913, when she was promoted to Assistant Matron. During the First World War she was Acting Matron as Matron Pinsent was serving overseas as a military nurse.

== See also ==
- List of hospitals in England
- List of NHS trusts
