= Kerin Lake =

Wales international rugby union player (born 1990)

- Born: 24 May 1990 (age 36) Neath, Neath Port Talbot, Wales
- Height: 5 ft 5 in (165 cm)
- School: Neath Port Talbot College
- Occupation: Healthcare admin support

Rugby union career
Senior career
Years	Team	Apps	(Points)
2006–2011	Neath Athletic		(0)
2016–2020	Ospreys Women's	26	(115)
2021–2024	Gloucester–Hartpury	22	(10)
2024–2025	Gwalia Lightning		
International career
Years	Team	Apps	(Points)
2011–2025	Wales	54	(20)

Kerin Lake (born 24 May 1990) is a former Welsh rugby union player who played centre for Gloucester–Hartpury of the Premiership Women's Rugby and the Wales women's national rugby union team. She made her debut for Wales in 2011 and has played for the national team 54 times, scoring four tries. Lake gives administrator support to Tonna Hospital's mental health staff while continuing her rugby career.

== Personal background ==
On 24 May 1990, Lake was born in Neath, Neath Port Talbot, Wales. She was educated at Neath Port Talbot College. As of 2021, Lake's official Welsh Rugby Union biography lists her height as 5 ft 5 in (1.65 m) and her weight as 69.09 kg (10.880 st). She plays as a centre. Lake has one son. Outside of rugby, she gives administration support to mental health staff at Tonna Hospital.

== International career ==
Lake has played for Wales at the Welsh Student team, and the Wales U19, and Wales U20 sides. She was shortlisted to be selected for the Wales national team for the 2010 Women's Rugby World Cup but ultimately did not play for the squad. Lake was named as a substitute for the Welsh team's first match of the 2011 Women's Six Nations Championship against England. She went on to make her international debut in the side's following match playing Scotland coming on as a substitute and scored her first international try in the same fixture. Lake went on to score her second try in the second half of a 8–12 defeat to Italy.

She did not play another international match until 2015 due to the birth of her son and due to her picking up an eye injury preventing her from playing until late 2019. Lake instead took up a refereeing role in the meantime. She returned to play for the Welsh national team at the 2015 Women's Six Nations Championship. Lake has gone on to play for the national team a further 25 times, scoring one try in earning 30 caps and four tries overall.

After Wales lost multiple matches in the 2021 Women's Six Nations Championship, Lake's partner defended her team on social media and praised Lake's work ethic, noting Wales international women players combine their playing careers with work commitment unlike fully professional teams such as the England side.

Lake was selected in Wales squad for the 2021 Rugby World Cup in New Zealand. She was named in the Welsh side for the 2025 Six Nations Championship in March.

On 11 August 2025, she was selected in the Welsh squad to the Women's Rugby World Cup in England.

== Club career ==
At the club level, she played for Neath Athletic from 2006 to 2011. Lake also played for Skewen RFC, before signing for the Ospreys Women's team in 2016. She was made vice-captain of the team, playing 26 times and scoring 23 tries for the side in each of the Women's Welsh Premiership and the Women's Super Cup competitions between 2016 and 2020. In August 2020, four months after undergoing back surgery, Lake signed for Gloucester–Hartpury of the English Premier 15s, having impressed coach Sean Lynn in pre-season training.

She announced her retirement from rugby on 11 February 2026
