= List of burn centres in the United Kingdom =

This is a list of burn centres in the United Kingdom. A burn centre or burn care facility is typically a hospital ward which specializes in the treatment of severe burn injuries. In British Overseas Territories, patients requiring specialist care, including severe burns, are often referred to hospitals in other nearby countries.

== England and Wales ==
=== London and South East England ===
The London and South East England Burn Network serves burn victims in London, the East of England, Kent, Surrey, Sussex, Thames Valley, and Wessex. It has four hospitals servicing around 21 million people.

- Broomfield Hospital, Chelmsford
- Chelsea & Westminster Hospital, London
- Queen Victoria Hospital, East Grinstead
- Stoke Mandeville Hospital, Aylesbury

=== Midlands ===
The Midlands Burn Care Network serves burn victims across the Midlands, providing care for approximately 13.7 million people.

- Queen Elizabeth Hospital, Birmingham
- Birmingham Children's Hospital
- Nottingham University Hospitals
- Leicester Royal Infirmary
- Royal Stoke University Hospital

=== South West ===
The SWUK Burn Care Network services approximately 10 million people in south west England and the south, mid and west of Wales.

- Southmead Hospital, Bristol
- Morriston Hospital, Swansea
- Salisbury District Hospital, Salisbury

=== North ===
The Northern Burn Care Network provides burn care for the population covered by the North of England (including the North East, North West, and Yorkshire and the Humber), North Wales and the Isle of Man.

- The Royal Victoria Infirmary, Newcastle
- Whiston Hospital
- Northern General Hospital, Sheffield
- Pinderfields Hospital
- Wythenshawe Hospital
- Royal Preston Hospital
- Royal Manchester Children's Hospital

=== Wales ===
Morriston Hospital, Swansea.

== Scotland ==
NHS Scotland has its own network of burn centres.

- Royal Aberdeen Hospital for Sick Children
- St John's Hospital, Livingston
- Glasgow Royal Hospital for Children
- Aberdeen Royal Infirmary
- Glasgow Royal Infirmary
- Royal Hospital for Sick Children, Edinburgh
- Ninewells Hospital, Dundee

== Northern Ireland ==
The Northern Ireland Regional Burn Care provides burn care for all of Northern Ireland.

- Royal Victoria Hospital, Belfast
