= Clydach War Memorial Hospital =

- Abertawe Bro Morgannwg University Health Board
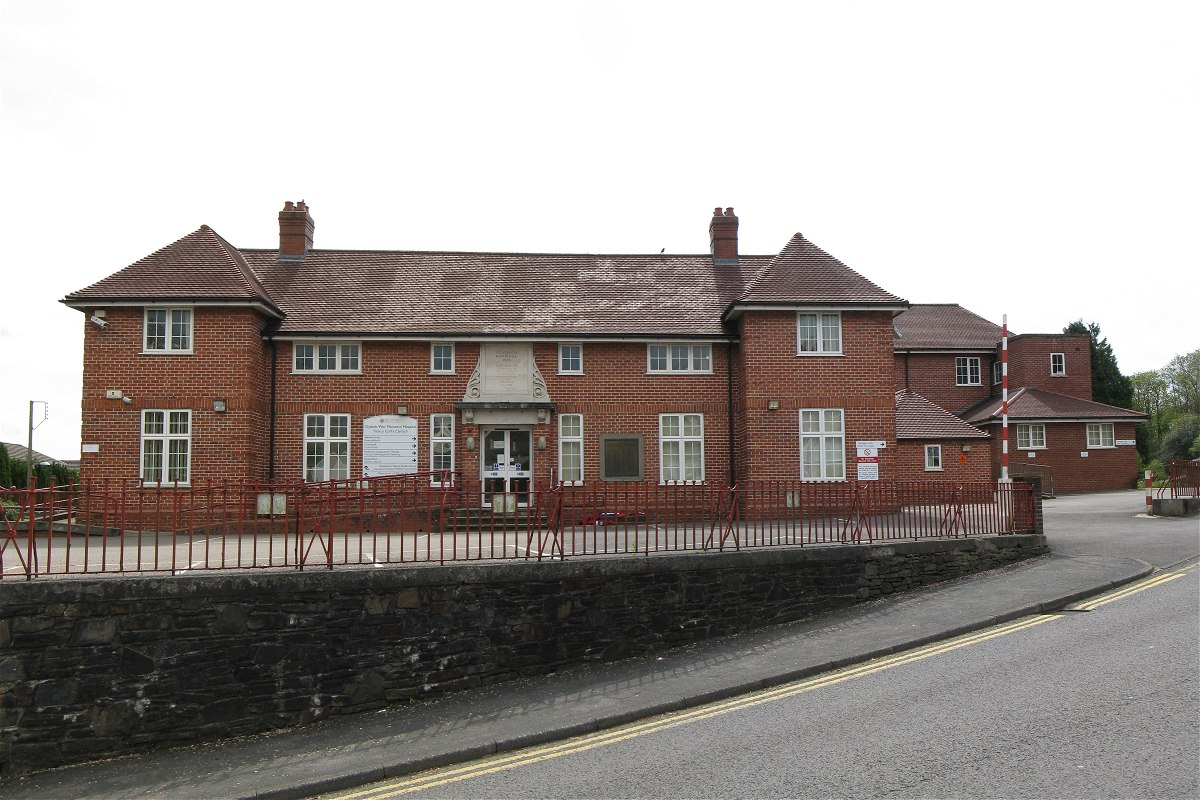
- Clydach War Memorial Hospital

- Shown in Swansea

Geography
- Location: Clydach, Swansea, Wales, United Kingdom
- Coordinates: 51.6947°N 3.9013°W

Organisation
- Care system: NHS Wales
- Type: Community hospital

Services
- Emergency department: No

History
- Founded: 1925
- Closed: 2015

Clydach War Memorial Hospital (Welsh: Ysbyty Coffa Clydach) was a community hospital in Clydach, Swansea, Wales. It was managed by the Abertawe Bro Morgannwg University Health Board.

== History ==
The hospital was founded by public subscription in 1925, on land given under covenant by the owner of the local tinplate works, W.J. "Percy" Player. A prototype community cottage hospital specialising in front-line mining injuries from the many private mines in the Swansea Valley, it joined the National Health Service in 1948, but was soon overshadowed by the much larger Morriston Hospital. It was re-opened following a £1 million refurbishment in March 2003 and continued to provide community based, clinic services until it closed in 2015. The main building was converted into apartments for ex-servicemen and women in 2017.
