= St Lawrence Hospital, Chepstow =

St Lawrence Hospital
- Shown in Monmouthshire

Geography
- Location: Chepstow, Monmouthshire, Wales
- Coordinates: 51.6390°N 2.6900°W

Organisation
- Care system: Local authority and private subscription to 1948; NHS from 1948
- Type: Specialist

Services
- Speciality: Burns unit

History
- Founded: 1942

Links
- Lists: Hospitals in Wales

St Lawrence Hospital (Welsh: Ysbyty St Lawrence) was a specialist plastic surgery and burns hospital on the west side of St Lawrence Road in Chepstow, Wales.

== History ==
St Lawrence Hospital was opened in 1942, on the opposite side of the road to Mount Pleasant Hospital, and was used by the War Department throughout the rest of the Second World War as a military hospital; patients included Italian prisoners of war. In September 1949, it was taken over by the Welsh Hospital Board and the Newport and East Monmouthshire Hospital Management Committee, to form a plastic surgery unit. Expansion in the 1950s brought the number of beds to 124, including a burns unit for which it became particularly well known. The lead surgeon in charge of the hospital at the time was Emlyn Evans Lewis (1905–1969).

In 1994 the burns and plastic surgery units were transferred to Morriston Hospital, Swansea. The hospital was later demolished and the site used for housing.
