= List of burn centres in Canada =

This is a list of burn centres in Canada. A burn centre or burn care facility is typically a hospital ward which specializes in the treatment of severe burn injuries. There are currently approximately 20 hospitals that care for burn injuries and receive referrals across Canada. Most provinces have at least one burn unit, and sometimes a hospital for adults and another for children. The largest verified burn centres are in Toronto.

== Alberta ==
- Calgary Firefighters Burn Treatment Centre, Foothills Hospital
- Firefighters Burn Treatment Unit, University of Alberta Hospital
- Alberta Children's Hospital

== British Columbia ==
- British Columbia Professional Firefighters Burn & Plastic Surgery Unit, Vancouver General Hospital
- British Columbia Children's Hospital, Vancouver
- Royal Jubilee Hospital, Victoria

== Manitoba ==
- The Manitoba Firefighters Burn Unit, Health Sciences Centre, Winnipeg
- The Firefighters Burn Fund Children's Burn Unit, HSC Winnipeg Children's Hospital

== New Brunswick ==
- General Surgery, Burns, and Plastic, Moncton Hospital

== Newfoundland ==
- The General Hospital, Health Sciences Centre, Janeway Children's Health and Rehabilitation Centre, St. Johns

== Nova Scotia ==
- IWK Health Centre, Halifax
- Queen Elizabeth II Health Sciences Centre, Halifax

== Ontario ==
- Ross Tilley Burn Centre, Sunnybrook Health Sciences Centre, Toronto
- Hamilton Firefighters Burn Unit, Hamilton Health Sciences
- The Hospital for Sick Children,
- Children's Hospital of Eastern Ontario, Ottawa

== Prince Edward Island ==
There are no designated burn centres in Prince Edward Island, though PEI hospitals treated 19 child burn cases between April 2015 and January 2016. There was no breakdown of how many burn-treated children at IWK Hospital in Nova Scotia were from PEI.

== Quebec ==
- Centre D'Expertise Aux Soins De Victimes De Brûlures Graves De L’ouest-Du-Québec, Hôtel-Dieu de Montréal
- Montreal Children's Hospital
- Centre D'Expertise Pour Les Personnes Victimes De Brûlures Graves De L’est-Du-Québec Centre Hospitalier Affilié Universitaire De Québec, Hôpital de l'Enfant-Jésus, Quebec City
- Unité Des Soins Intensifs Pédiatriques Chu, Centre hospitalier universitaire Sainte-Justine

== Saskatchewan ==
- Royal University Hospital
- Firefighters Burn Unit, Regina General Hospital

== Territories ==
There are no known burn centres in the territories of Yukon, Nunavut, and the Northwest Territories
