= List of burn centres in Australia =

While many hospitals in Australia have the capability to treat burns, there are currently 13 designated burns units across Australia. Most states have one centre for adults and another for children; all units are located in a state/territorial capital city.

== Australian Capital Territory ==
The ACT (Canberra) currently has no designated burns unit; patients with severe burns are usually transferred to Concord Repatriation General Hospital or The Children’s Hospital at Westmead in New South Wales.

== New South Wales ==
- Concord Repatriation General Hospital
- Royal North Shore Hospital, St Leonards
- The Children’s Hospital at Westmead

== Northern Territory ==
- Royal Darwin Hospital

Patients with severe burns are also transferred to Royal Adelaide Hospital or Women's and Children's Hospital in South Australia.

== Queensland ==
- Royal Brisbane Hospital
- Queensland Children's Hospital, South Brisbane (since the closure of the Royal Children's Hospital, Herston)

== South Australia ==
- Royal Adelaide Hospital
- Women's and Children's Hospital, North Adelaide

== Victoria ==
- The Alfred, Melbourne
- Royal Children's Hospital, Melbourne

== Tasmania ==
- Royal Hobart Hospital

== Western Australia ==
- Fiona Stanley Hospital, Murdoch
- Perth Children's Hospital, Nedlands
