= Amanda Sergeant =

British newsreader

Amanda Sergeant is a British newsreader. Before breaking into the world of journalism, she was a part of Radio City 1386AM, a Swansea based hospital radio station.

Sergeant began her career starting as a BBC radio researcher in 1993, after completing her postgraduate training at the Centre for Journalism Studies at Cardiff University.

She progressed quickly through the ranks, becoming a TV reporter specialising in live outside broadcasts, then a senior TV presenter with BBC Wales.

Since joining GMTV, Sergeant has reported on a wide variety of national and international news stories, from the Kosovo War in Macedonia to New York Fashion Week and the Grammys in Los Angeles.

She divides her time between London and Wales where she lives with her husband, broadcaster and writer Miles Fletcher.

She is also an accomplished gardener.

Sergeant joined national breakfast station GMTV in 2004, where she was a news correspondent and occasional relief news presenter; however, she left in early 2008.
