= Neath Port Talbot Hospital =

- Swansea Bay University Health Board
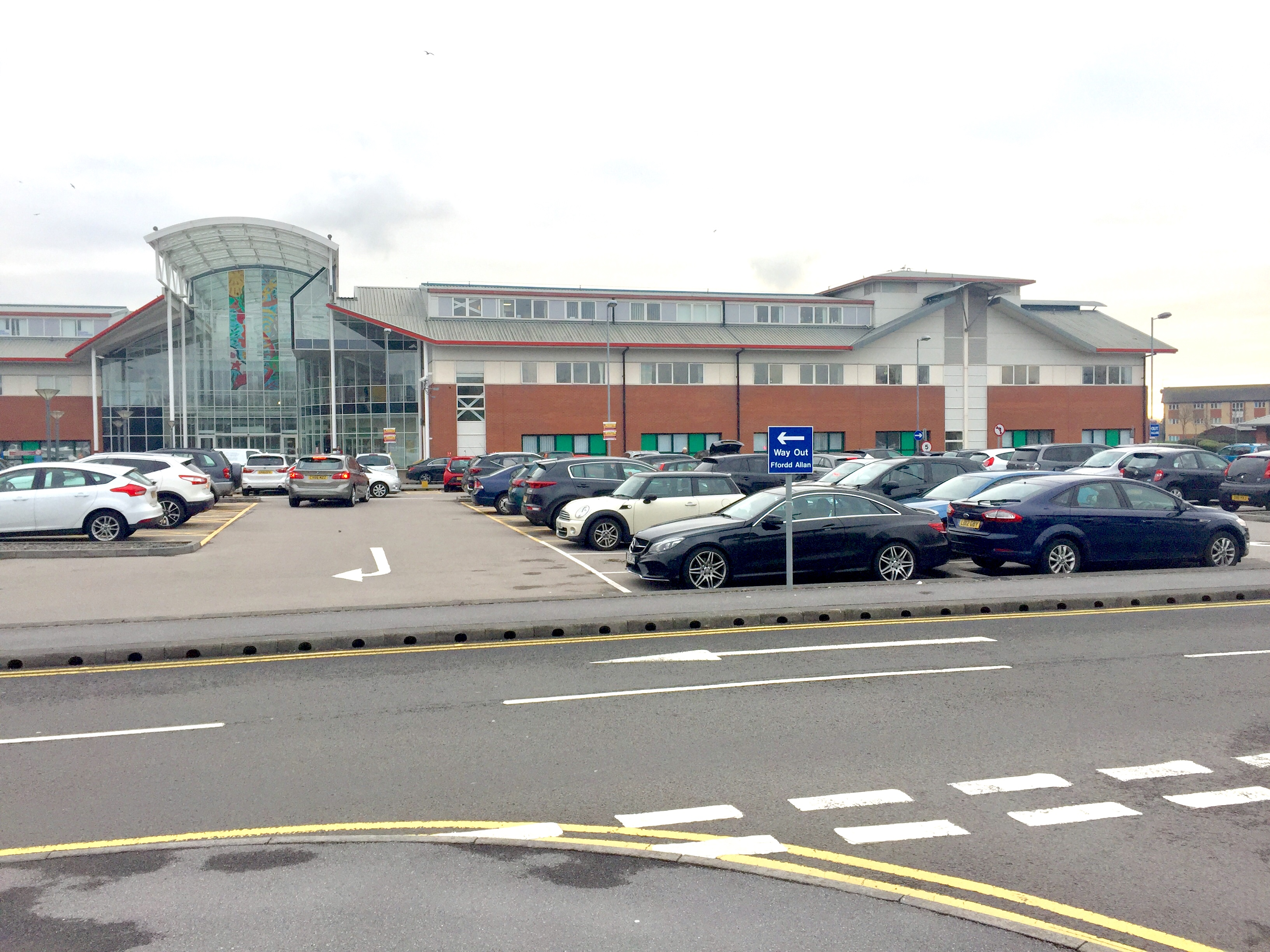
- Exterior of the hospital

- Shown in Neath Port Talbot

Geography
- Location: Baglan, Port Talbot, Wales, United Kingdom
- Coordinates: 51.59924°N 3.80039°W

Organisation
- Care system: NHS Wales
- Type: General
- Affiliated university: Swansea University Medical School; Cardiff University School of Medicine

Services
- Emergency department: Minor Injury Unit
- Beds: 270

History
- Founded: 2003

Links
- Website: sbuhb.nhs.wales/hospitals/our-hospitals/neath-port-talbot-hospital/
- Lists: Hospitals in Wales

Neath Port Talbot Hospital (Welsh: Ysbyty Castell Nedd Port Talbot) is a general hospital located in Port Talbot, Wales. It is managed by Swansea Bay University Health Board.

== History ==
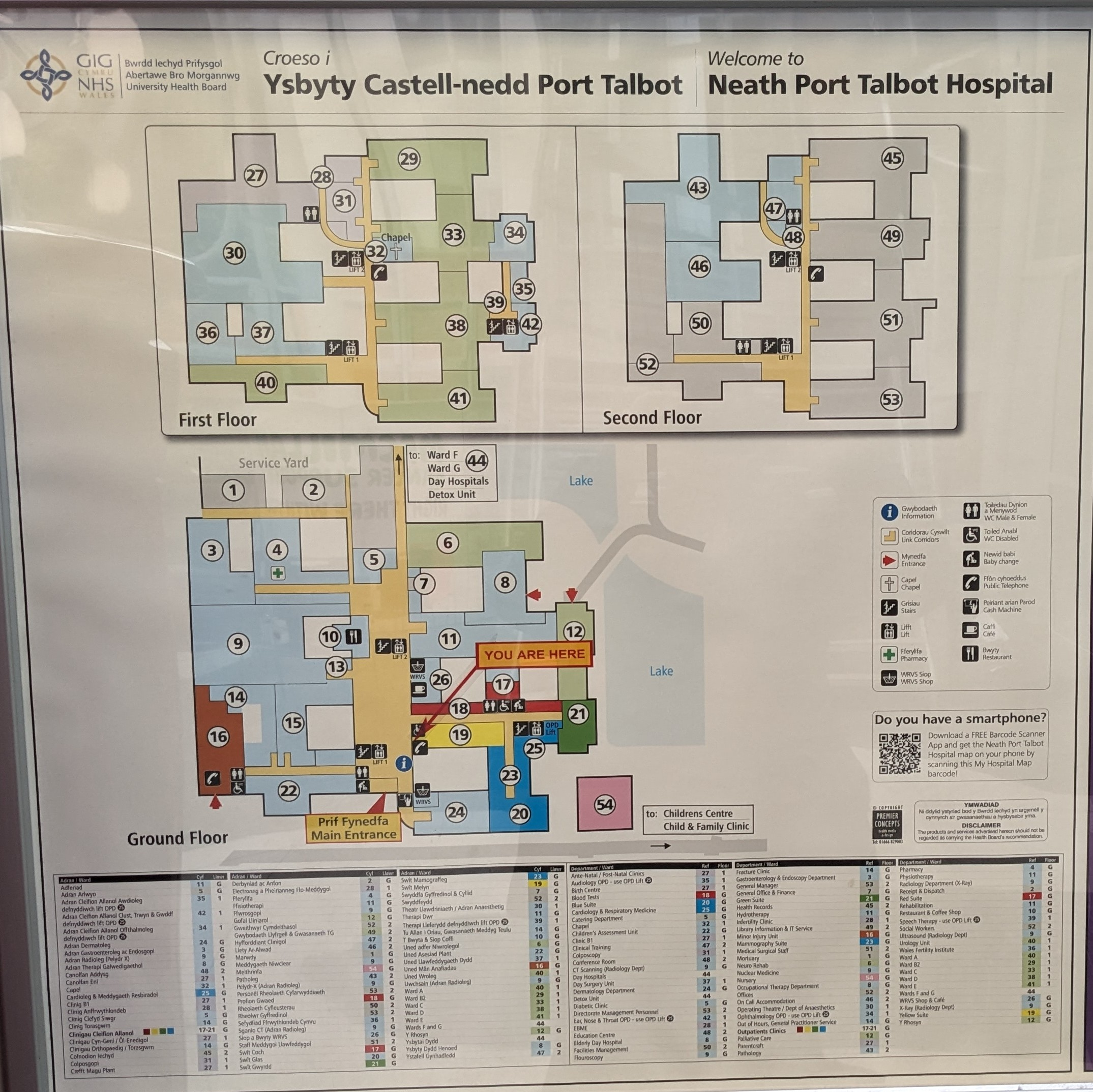
Neath Port Talbot Hospital Site Map

The hospital, which was commissioned to replace Neath General Hospital and Port Talbot General Hospital, was procured under a Private Finance Initiative contract in May 2000. It was designed by SSL and built by Kier Group at a cost of £56 million; it was officially opened by the Prince of Wales on 3 February 2003.

In September 2012 the Health Board announced significant investment to create a new specialist IVF unit and expand the urology unit at the hospital in a bid to recruit and retain experienced clinicians.

In June 2023, a £21M expansion was completed which included three new theatres.

== Performance ==
In May 2014 staff at the hospital was criticised in a report into the death of an elderly patient who had been treated at the hospital; the report found that there had been "variable or poor professional behaviour and practice in the care of frail older people".
