= Tim Briggs (surgeon) =

British surgeon

Professor Timothy William Roy Briggs, CBE FRCS (born December 1957) is an orthopaedic surgeon at the Royal National Orthopaedic Hospital NHS Trust (RNOH), chairman of the Federation of Specialist Hospitals, Chair of the Veterans Covenant Healthcare Alliance and a former president of the British Orthopaedic Association.

== Early life ==
Tim Briggs was born in December 1957. He qualified at the Royal London Hospital in 1982.

== Career ==
Briggs was appointed a consultant orthopaedic surgeon at the Royal National Orthopaedic Hospital in 1992. He was medical director at the RNOH for 15 years. He is chairman of the Federation of Specialist Hospitals and a former president of the British Orthopaedic Association.

He was appointed National Director for Clinical Quality and Efficiency by Jeremy Hunt in October 2015. When appointed he said that surgical patients were at risk of infections because beds were not “ring-fenced” for those undergoing the same types of procedures. There was a 25-fold variation in infection rates for the same procedure in different hospitals. He had visited 211 hospitals and seen unwanted variation in practice. He thought that some consultants carrying out too few procedures to become sufficiently skilled, and in some places junior staff were given too much responsibility. His report on hip replacement concluded that at least 35 operations a year were needed before a surgeon could produce acceptable results. He produced tables showing the data both for hospitals and for individual surgeons and this had striking effects. The number of infections and failed operations fell, as did the cost of follow-up surgery and litigation. His "Getting it Right First Time" (GIRFT) expanded into 40 medical and surgical specialities. Jeremy Hunt attributes this to the "unusual combination of competitiveness and altruism that is innate to most doctors".

Briggs served as the training programme director for the Royal National Orthopaedic Hospital registrar (resident) training programme for over 20 years, supporting and leading the training of hundreds of trauma and orthopaedic surgeons during this time.
