= Burn center =

Health care facility specialising in the treatment of burns

A burn center, burn ward, burn unit, or burns unit is a hospital specializing in the treatment of burns. Burn centers are often used for the treatment and recovery of patients with more severe burns.

== Overview ==
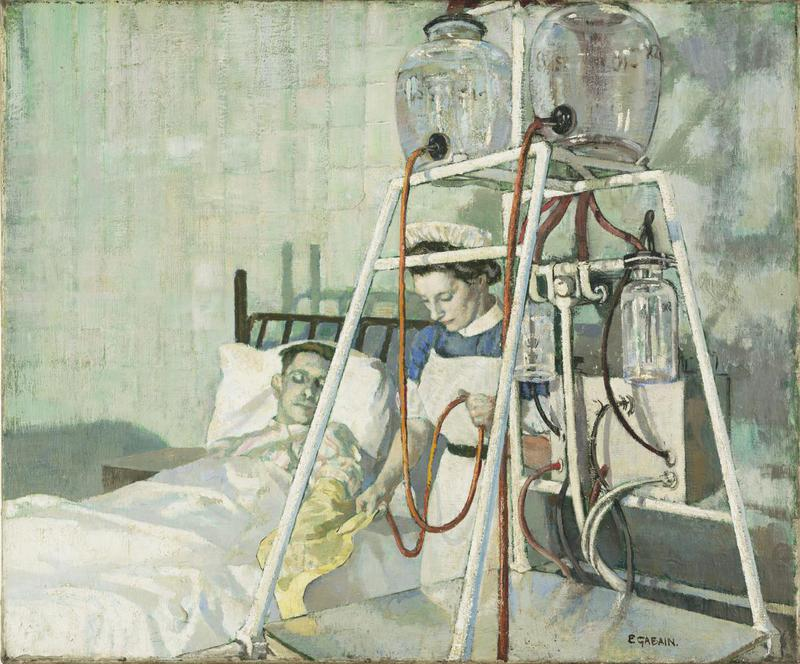
A Bunyan-Stannard Irrigation Envelope for the Treatment of Burns being applied by Sister Roberts in Middlesex Hospital by Ethel Léontine Gabain (1943): A patient being treated for burns with a sleeve that contains a dilute sodium hypochlorite solution for wound care

The severity of a burn, and therefore whether a referral will be made after the patient is treated and stabilized, differs depending upon many factors, among them: the age of the victim (burns to infants and toddlers or to those over age 65 are generally more serious, particularly if the face, head, respiratory system, chest, abdomen, groin, or extremities are burned; those who are not in these age groups can be more affected if they are or were already ill, injured, or immunocompromised), the total body surface area that is burned (the rule of nines), if proper treatment and referrals are delayed or the wrong treatments are given, if the burns are of the 2nd, 3rd, or 4th degree (the bigger and deeper, the worse it is), the source (if it was due to a chemical, or from a scald, or fire, or radiation, the treatment regimen has to be modified appropriately), or if skin grafting is not feasible and/or important organs are harmed.

== Burn team ==
A burn center needs a team approach for the management of critically burned patients. Usually, the burns management team consists of a intensivist, burn nurse, plastic surgeon, chest physician, general surgeon, anesthesiologist, respiratory therapist, pediatrician, technicians, microbiologist, psychiatrist, nutritionist, physiotherapist, and social worker. Early burn wound excision and immediate wound cover can improve the chances of survival in major burn cases.

== Lists of burn centers ==
- List of burn centres in Australia
- List of burn centres in Canada
- List of burn centres in Bahrain
- List of burn centres in the United Kingdom
- List of burn centers in the United States
