= Hospedia =

Hospital infotainment provider

- Formerly: PatientLine
- Industry: Hospital equipment
- Area served: United Kingdom
- Key people: James Steventon, CEO
- Products: Hospital bedside televisions, Clinical Workflow Solutions
- Brands: Patient Flow
- Services: Hospital patient media delivery. Clinical Flow Solutions.
- Owner: WiFi SPARK
- Website: www.hospedia.co.uk

Hospedia Ltd (formerly PatientLine) is a provider of bedside communication and entertainment units in UK hospitals which also sells clinical workflow solutions for NHS Trusts.

== History ==
Hospedia Ltd is a private limited company, established in 1993. Hospedia acquired Patientline during July 2008 after the company entered administration. Hospedia then looked to acquire Patientline's main competitor, Premier Telesolutions, which would have given Hospedia responsibility for over 80,000 bedside television units.

The proposed acquisition was referred to the Office of Fair Trading in 2008. On 30 October 2009, the Competition Commission announced that it had cancelled its inquiry into the acquisition.

In August 2010 Hospedia Ltd was acquired from Hospedia Holdings LTD by Marlin Equity Partners, Tim Weil, Hospedia's CEO, claimed:

Marlin’s significant capital base and shared vision for upgrading our installed base of over 65,000 terminals with our latest generation technology will enable Hospedia to provide a better service to patients and simultaneously provide hospitals with a means to significantly improve efficiency and reduce costs.

Hospedia acquired 65,000 bed locations from the former Patientline in 2012, which secured the company a position to project itself as the only choice provider for all future Healthcare IT services. This position is unlikely to be rivalled as the installation costs of the original programme were never recovered, making a nationwide installation programme by any other company unrealistic. The Monopolies and Mergers Commission recognised the danger of the company having a majority stake of these locations and blocked the merger with Premier Telesolutions in 2008, however Hospedia came to manage some of these sites including Northampton General Hospital.

=== JAOtech ===
In 2010, JAOtech based in Redhill, Surrey, gained a contract with Hospedia, to renew bedside terminals across their entire estate in the UK. The contract was worth $3.25 million over twelve months.

In September 2011, JAOtech & Hospedia had installed 6,500 new bedside terminals across the UK, this number was far lower than the expected number that was to have renewed contracts replacing the old T1 and T2 systems. By July 2012, the number of new units installed had increased by a further 8500, with the total in excess of 15,000.

JAOtech was acquired by Barco NV in 2011.

In November 2011, Hospedia announced that it had entered another partnership to secure funding for the continuing installation of the new systems with GE Capital.

In 2012, Hospedia bought patient flow and bed management supplier Extramed.

== Services ==
This service currently includes standard Freeview channels, on-demand films and TV, games, internet access and radio. Media is delivered to patients via Hospedia's bedside terminals. A variety of entertainment packages are available depending on a patient's length of stay and whether they wish to have access to films on demand, games, and/or internet. Registering on the bedside system allows patients to make free unlimited outgoing calls to 01, 02, 03 and certain 07 numbers, this was partly balanced by the revenue generated from incoming calls made to the patient's unique Hospedia 070 telephone number.

Concerned at the lack of transparency and the high retail charges for calls to 070 numbers, Ofcom launched a call cost review in 2017. This led to a consultation in 2018 which recommended capping the termination rate or wholesale rate at no more than the rate for calling a mobile number. Those changes took effect on 1 October 2019, the wholesale rate was reduced from around 49p per minute to just 0.489p per minute, and several landline and mobile phone providers immediately passed the saving on by including calls to 070 numbers within inclusive allowances.

Just as this change was happening, Hospedia abandoned usage of Personal Numbers starting 070 for bedside telephones, and has instead swapped to Premium Rate Numbers in various number ranges from 0872 800 xxxx to 0872 849 xxxx, supplied by Nexus Communications. Calls to these numbers incur an Access Charge of up to 65p per minute levied by the caller's telephone provider, and a Service Charge of 13p per minute levied by Hospedia. These are Controlled Premium Rate Services (CPRS) regulated by the Phone-paid Services Authority (PSA).

Hospedia has explored provision of patient surveys through their bedside terminals. This however has still to be proved as a successful way of conducting surveys as pilot schemes until now how proved slightly unbalanced as only a certain category of patients are able to use the bedside terminal. In the past, the Picker Institute has expressed reservations with regard to the use of bedside terminals. However, in 2012 the institute partnered with Hospedia to offer extensive real time patient surveys through their Frequent Feedback service.

== Public opinion ==
Public opinion has been critical of both Patientline and Hospedia, as many feel that charging the sick and vulnerable to access television in hospital is unacceptable. In 2012 The Sunday Mirror covered increase of charges, with reporter Nick Owens stating that the cost of hospital television was £9 per day, a higher figure than that paid by prison inmates.

Wholesale charges for calls made to the units remained at the personal numbers rate of 49p per minute for the duration of the period when 070 telephone numbers were employed, with callers paying considerably more. Moving to Premium Rate 0872 numbers with a 13p per minute Service Charge in late 2019 has resulted in friends and relatives of patients having to pay up to 78p per minute to call the bedside phone.

In 2010 the company featured on the BBC's consumer affairs programme Watchdog which portrayed the company in "favourable" light, neither negative or positive.

A major criticism is that cards purchased from Hospedia card machines are non-refundable; the company state that if the patient pays by credit or debit card, any unused credit is refunded. However, getting such a refund has proven to be time-consuming in practice, requiring the ward, bay and bed numbers to be known. In February 2010, the then head of the Patients Association Michael Summers described the process as "a tax on the ill", saying that "They are a captive audience and many patients simply can’t afford these prices".

In 2009 there were also complaints about a lack of "on site" support for operational problems with bedside units, and this was especially the case out of regular working hours when Hospedia relied on its 24-hour premium-rate helpline to resolve issues. It was recognised that this approach did not always meet patients' needs.

The decrease in face-to-face and telephone customer service has led to even more frustration, as when patients or visitors call the helpline from the unit, the operators are not now able to offer full customer service or replace any lost time due to faults, and these enquiries are now passed to a new department in the company's head office in Slough.

When the Government introduced PPI in 2000, they were committed to providing every patient in the NHS with bedside television and telephone services. The providers of these services, Patientline, Hospicom (now HTS) and The Wandsworth Group were to recover their costs by charging patients and also hospitals using them for medical services. The demand, however, was lower than anticipated.

The Patient Power review group has expressed its concerns about the increasing costs of the bedside services and has become the most vocal of groups challenging the use of these terminals at a cost to patients. The group has launched a number of protests against the charges and Hospedia issued a statement in February 2011 to explain that they supported a reduction in both the cost of telephone calls and the use of non-geographic numbers, which had been assigned back in 2000, and were hopeful that these measures would assist in lowering the cost of such calls.

Health Secretary Andrew Lansley MP featured on a video on the system which came under criticism.

In 2021 Hospedia was acquired by Volaris Group.

== Hospital radio ==
While the television services are charged for, Hospedia has continued to provide hospital radio for free, enabling the hospital to reach patients via their stations on the bedside units. The hospital stations are to be found on channel 1 on the system which also includes the facility to contact the station via the telephone on the unit. Listening through traditional means required hospitals to maintain a radio system beside each bed, but in many locations Hospedia is now the only way to access hospital radio.

== Payment technology ==
Hospedia had predicted that the majority of people staying in hospital would pay for services using mobile phones, credit cards and other "smart" technology. This has led to a rethink of the removal of all card dispensers in hospitals. In 2012 Hospedia acquired the hospital workflow management specialists Extramed.

Future plans including online prescription information and a move into online healthcare information are being looked at, as the company tries to detach itself from just being a television service provider.

== IT systems ==
Marlin Equity Partners who are also behind enterprise resource planning business Solarsoft acquired Hospedia LTD in 2010.

The following hospitals have upgraded to the new T3 System: Addenbrookes Hospital, Epsom General Hospital, Royal Oldham Hospital, Whiston Hospital, Eastbourne Hospital, Chesterfield Royal Hospital, Broomfield Hospital, Carlisle Infirmary, Salford Royal Hospital, Castle Hill Hospital, Salisbury Hospital, Bournemouth General, Wythenshawe Hospital, Good Hope Hospital, St Helier Hospital, North Manchester Hospital Manchester Royal Infirmary.

Mid Essex Hospital, Cambridge University Hospitals, Southampton University Hospitals and Heart of England NHS foundation trusts have started using the Clinical Access Services provided by Hospedia.

== See also ==
- Hospital Radio
