= Fairwood Hospital =

- Swansea Bay University Health Board
- Track to Fairwood Hospital

- Shown in Swansea

Geography
- Location: Upper Killay, Swansea, West Glamorgan, Wales, United Kingdom
- Coordinates: 51.6160°N 4.0499°W

Organisation
- Care system: NHS Wales
- Type: Specialist

Services
- Emergency department: No
- Speciality: Care for the elderly

History
- Founded: 1914
- Closed: 2010

Fairwood Hospital (Welsh: Ysbyty Fairwood) was a health facility in Upper Killay, Swansea, Wales. It was managed by the Swansea Bay University Health Board.

== History ==
The facility was established as a fever hospital in 1914. After joining the National Health Service in 1948 it was first a maternity hospital before changing its focus to elderly care. After being found to be uneconomic to operate, it closed in 2010. The site was subsequently acquired by Care Inn in 2019.
