= Gorseinon Hospital =

- Swansea Bay University Health Board
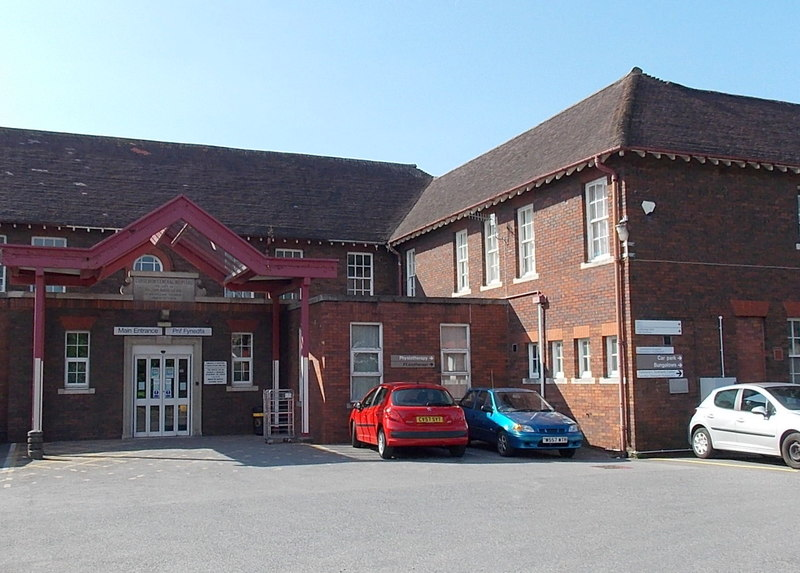
- Main entrance to Gorseinon Hospital

- Shown in Swansea

Geography
- Location: Gorseinon, Swansea, Wales, United Kingdom
- Coordinates: 51.6722°N 4.0480°W

Organisation
- Care system: NHS Wales
- Type: Specialist

Services
- Emergency department: No
- Speciality: Rehabilitation

History
- Founded: 1936

Gorseinon Hospital (Welsh: Ysbyty Gorseinon) is a rehabilitation hospital in Gorseinon, Wales. It is managed by Swansea Bay University Health Board.

== History ==
The hospital was established by William Rufus Lewis, proprietor of the local woolen mill firm of William Lewis & Sons, in 1936. It joined the National Health Service as a general hospital in 1948 but subsequently developed a large maternity department and became the Gorseinon General and Maternity Hospital. It specialised as a rehabilitation hospital in the early 1990s and then developed a treatment centre to help patients with Parkinson's disease in 2004.

== Gallery ==
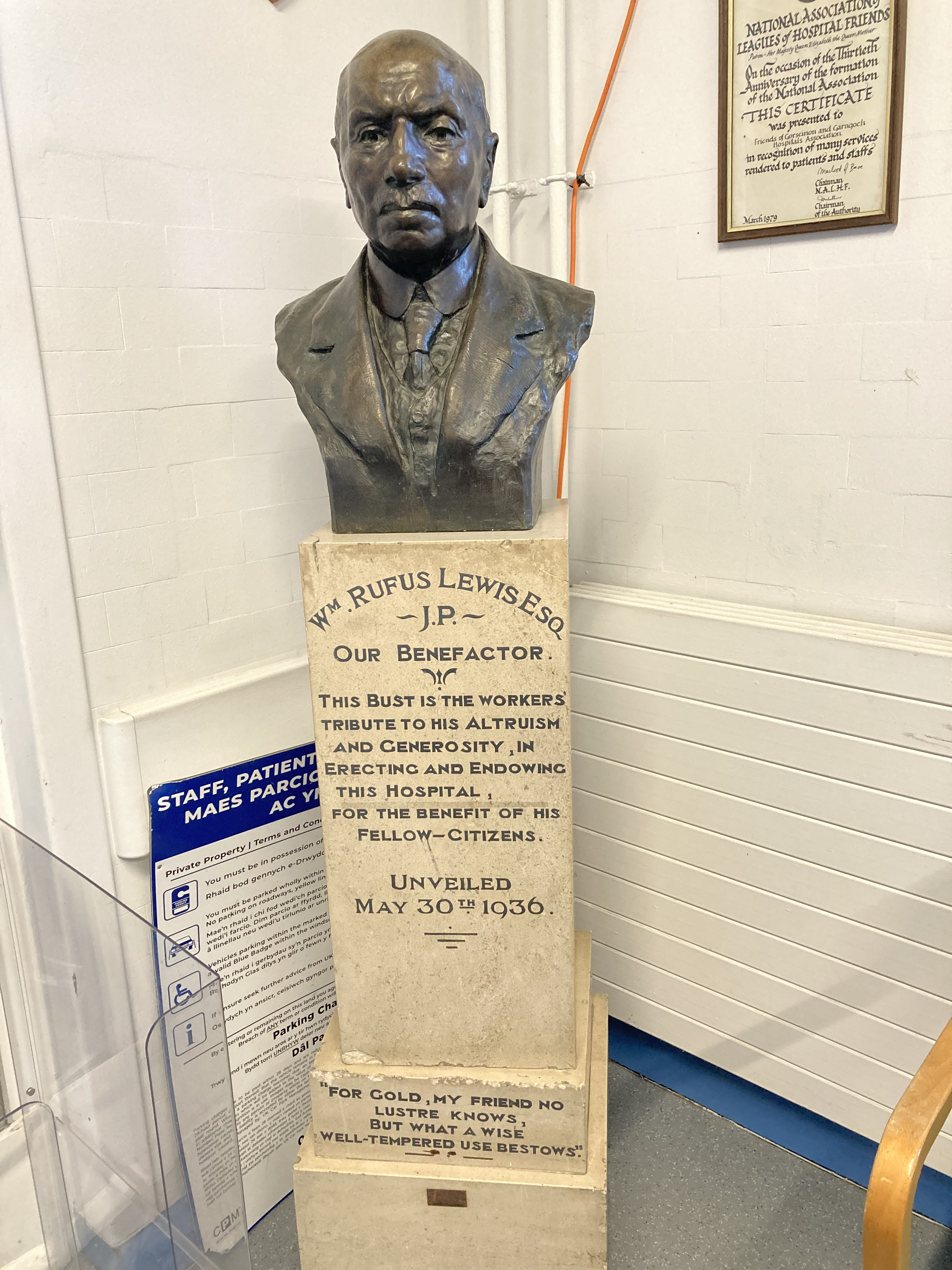

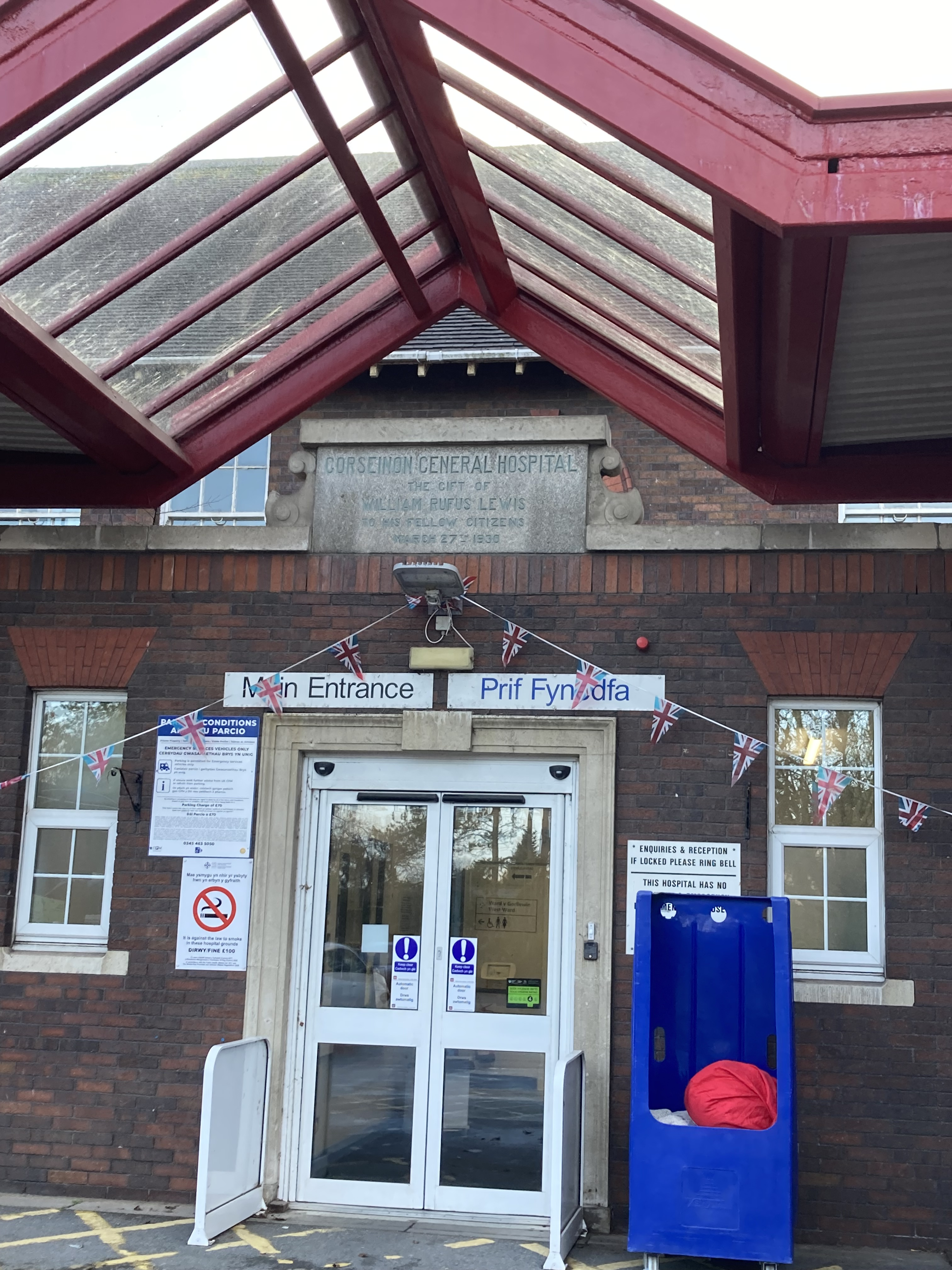
