= Cefn Coed Hospital =

- Swansea Bay University Health Board
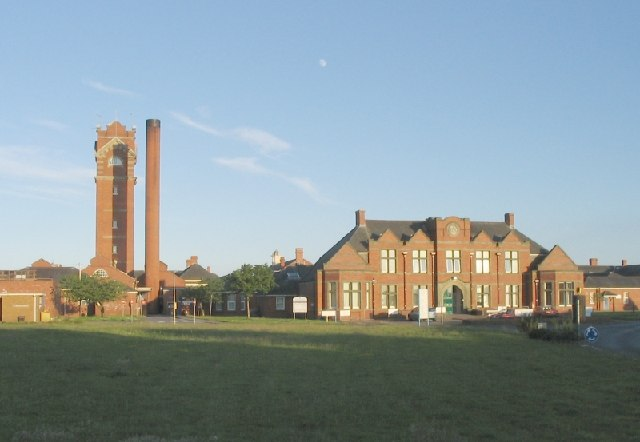
- Cefn Coed Hospital

- Shown in Swansea

Geography
- Location: Swansea, West Glamorgan, Wales, United Kingdom
- Coordinates: 51°37′41.00″N 3°59′20.00″W

Organisation
- Care system: NHS Wales
- Type: Specialist

Services
- Emergency department: No
- Speciality: Mental health

History
- Founded: 1932

Links
- Website: sbuhb.nhs.wales/hospitals/our-hospitals/cefn-coed-hospital/

Cefn Coed Hospital (Welsh: Ysbyty Cefn Coed) is a mental-health facility in Swansea, Wales. It is managed by the Swansea Bay University Health Board.

== History ==
The hospital was designed by George Thomas Hine and Hallam Carter-Pegg using a compact arrow layout, and was officially opened by the Princess Royal as Swansea Mental Hospital in 1932. It was used as a casualty hospital during the Second World War.

In 2002, the University of Wales Swansea reported that the hospital had to lock up patients due to understaffing.

Work started in 2009 to build modern replacement mental-health accommodation and facilities, including Ysbryd y Coed, which is purpose-built for patients with dementia, in the grounds of Cefn Coed. Other new-builds in the Cefn Coed grounds are the 18-bed Gwelfor Rehabilitation Unit, a pub featuring non-alcoholic beer called “The Derwen Arms”, and two supported houses for recovering patients preparing to move back home.

In March 2015, the health board's new low-secure mental-health unit, Taith Newydd, opened in Bridgend, replacing some of the old wards at Cefn Coed. Other new mental-health builds include the ARC Centre and Angelton Clinic in Bridgend, and Ty Einon in Swansea. In 2015, the NHS announced that the phased closure of Cefn Coed Hospital would continue for the next three to five years, with several decommissioned wards planned for demolition that year.

In June 2019, the hospital was one of the filming locations for the Channel 4 drama, The Accident, starring Sarah Lancashire. The series aired on the 24 October 2019.

== Notable staff ==
The comedienne Jo Brand was once a psychiatric nurse at the hospital.
