= Swansea Bay University Health Board =

NHS local health board in South West Wales

- Bwrdd lechyd Prifysgol Bae Abertawe

- Map of service area in Wales
- Former name: Abertawe Bro Morgannwg University Health Board
- Type: NHS Wales local health board
- Headquarters: 1 Talbot Gateway, Baglan Energy Park, Baglan, Port Talbot, SA12 7BR
- Region served: Swansea; Neath Port Talbot
- Hospitals: Cefn Coed Hospital; Gorseinon Hospital; Morriston Hospital; Neath Port Talbot Hospital; Singleton Hospital; Tonna Hospital
- Chief executive: Mark Hackett
- Website: sbuhb.nhs.wales

Swansea Bay University Health Board (SBUHB) (Welsh: Bwrdd lechyd Prifysgol Bae Abertawe) is the local health board of NHS Wales for Swansea and Neath Port Talbot, in the south-west of Wales. Established as Abertawe Bro Morgannwg University Health Board (ABMUHB) in 2009, it was renamed and had its boundaries altered on 1 April 2019. In February 2019 it was decided to rename it Swansea Bay University Health Board and to alter the boundary with the Cwm Taf University Health Board (now Cwm Taf Morgannwg University Health Board).

The board's predecessor, the Abertawe Bro Morgannwg University Health Board was formally created on 1 October 2009 when the Abertawe Bro Morgannwg University NHS Trust formally merged with the local health boards of Swansea, Neath Port Talbot and Bridgend. The headquarters for Abertawe Bro Morgannwg University NHS Trust (and the existing health board) is located in Baglan Bay, Port Talbot and the first Chief Executive was Paul Williams. The Abertawe Bro Morgannwg University NHS Trust was in turn formed on 1 April 2008 from the merger of Swansea NHS Trust and Bro Morgannwg NHS Trust. From 1 April 2019, the Abertawe Bro Morgannwg University Health Board was renamed to the Swansea Bay University Health Board following exchanges of authority with the neighbouring Cwm Taf University Health Board (renamed to the Cwm Taf Morgannwg University Health Board), which took over the control of providing health services in Bridgend from the Abertawe Bro Morgannwg University Health Board.

SBUHB serves 390,000 people and employs 12,500 staff. The health board has a budget of £1 billion, and is a designated university local health board linked to Swansea University. Training centres are located at Singleton Hospital, Morriston Hospital and Phillips Parade Children's Orthopaedic Clinic.

On 22 October 2020 it was announced that Mark Hackett would take over as Chief Executive from the retiring Tracy Myhill. The appointment is effective as of 1 January 2021.

== Hospitals ==
Current hospitals

- Cefn Coed Hospital (Swansea) – psychiatric hospital
- Gorseinon Hospital (Swansea) – elderly care and rehabilitation hospital, outpatient clinic and specialist Parkinson's treatment centre
- Morriston Hospital (Swansea) – university teaching hospital
- Neath Port Talbot Hospital (Port Talbot) – district general hospital
- Singleton Hospital (Swansea) – university teaching hospital
- Tonna Hospital (Neath Port Talbot) – base for psychiatric care for the elderly in the Vale of Neath, includes day care hospital

Former hospitals

- Blackmill Hospital – (1903–1985) – a former isolation hospital
- Bridgend General Hospital – (1838–1990s) – a former workhouse which became a district general hospital.
- Cefn Hirgoed Hospital – (1906–1990) – a former isolation hospital and infirmary for elderly and disabled patients, demolished to make way for Sainsbury and McArthur Glen Shopping Centre.
- Clydach War Memorial Hospital – (1925–2015), a former community hospital.
- Fairwood Hospital – (1914–2010) – a former isolation hospital.
- Groeswen Hospital – (Port Talbot) – (1932–2006), demolished in 2006 and now a housing estate
- Heddfan Hospital – (1906–1980) – a former isolation hospital, demolished to make way for the M4 motorway.
- Hensol Hospital – (1930–2003) – a former learning disability hospital, the hospital became no longer necessary once the care for patients with learning disabilities moved to community care. The remaining patients who could not be cared for in community were moved out to learning disability bungalows to help them integrate with their local community.
- Hill House Hospital – (1929–2013) – originally an isolation hospital.
- Llynfi Hospital – closed in the 1990s – a former community hospital.
- Maesgwyn Hospital – closed in 2011 – a former community hospital.
- Mount Pleasant Hospital – (1862–1995) – a former workhouse which became a district general hospital.
- Neath General Hospital – (1916–2002) – a former workhouse which became a district general hospital.
- Parc Hospital – (1886–1996) – a former mental health facility, currently being used a prison.
- Penyfai Hospital – (1936–1990s) – a former mental health facility
- Port Talbot General Hospital – (1916–2002) – based in Sandfields, Port Talbot

== Community services ==
=== District Nursing and Community Nursing ===
- Afan District Nursing (Neath Port Talbot)
- Neath District Nursing (Neath Port Talbot)
- Upper Valleys District Nursing (Neath Port Talbot)
- Swansea North District Nursing (Swansea)
- Swansea Central District Nursing (Swansea)
- Swansea West District Nursing (Swansea)
- Community Continence Service

=== Integrated Community Reablement and Acute Clinical Teams ===
- Neath Port Talbot Community Reablement Team
- Neath Port Talbot Acute Clinical Team
- Swansea Acute Clinical Team
- Podiatry (Port Talbot Resource Centre)
- Wound Clinics

=== Allied Health and Therapies ===
- Community Physiotherapy
- Community Nutrition and Dietetics
- Community Occupational Therapy
- Community Speech and Language Therapy

== Mental health and learning disabilities ==
=== Community mental health teams ===
- Neath Port Talbot North CMHT (Pontardawe)
- Neath Port Talbot South CMHT – (Forge Centre, Port Talbot)
- Swansea West (Area 1) CMHT – (Central Clinic, Swansea)
- Swansea Central (Area 2) CMHT – (Central Clinic, Swansea)
- Swansea North (Area 3) CMHT –(Clydach War Memorial Hospital in Clydach)
- Ystradgynlais CMHT – (The Larches, Ystradgynlais)

=== Learning disability units ===
- Dan-y-bont (Kenfig Hill)
- Hafod Y Wennol AATU (Pontyclun)
- Bryn Afon (Ferndale)
- Meadow Court (Tonyrefail)
- Ty Garth Newydd (Church Village)
- Ty Penfro (Cardiff)
- The Laurels & The Briary (Cardiff)
- Rowan House AATU (Cardiff)
- Llywneryr AATU (Swansea)
- Dan-Y-Deri (Swansea)
- Llety Newydd (Cardiff)

=== Veterans NHS Wales ===
Veterans NHS Wales is a specialised, priority service for individuals who have served in the Armed Forces, at any time in their lives and who are experiencing mental health difficulties related specifically to their military service.

== Urgent and unscheduled care ==
=== Morriston Hospital Emergency Department ===
The emergency department (ED) at Morriston Hospital if it's for serious and life-threatening conditions that need immediate medical attention including breathing difficulties, persistent severe chest pain, heavy blood loss, severe burns, loss of consciousness, suspected stroke, deep wounds.

=== Neath Port Talbot Hospital Minor Injuries Unit ===
An experienced team of specially-trained emergency nurse practitioners, triage nurses and health care support workers treat patients for minor conditions including cuts and minor burns; sprains and strains; broken bones; dislocation of the shoulder, fingers and toes; head or face injuries; neck injuries; back injuries; foreign bodies to eyes, ears and nose; rib injuries; bites (insect, animal or human); insect stings; and assaults.

== Performance ==
In September 2016, Welsh Government placed the health board (then Abertawe Bro Morgannwg University Health Board) into targeted intervention status as part of NHS Wales Escalation and Intervention. The Health Board was de-escalated into 'enchanted monitoring' status, in a statement from the Minister for Health and Social Services on 7 October 2020 praising the Board's response to the COVID-19 pandemic and approach to performance of key areas including cancer and infections.

In 2018/19, the health board achieved the following against key priority measures:

- 74.5% of patients waiting less than 4 hours in ED (Welsh Government target is 95%)
- 653 patients waited longer than 12 hours in ED (Welsh Government target is 0)
- 62% of stroke patients had a direct admission within 1 hour (target is 47%)
- 96% of stroke patients were assessed by a specialist within 24 hours (target is 87%)
- 236 outpatients were waiting longer than 26 weeks for treatment (target is 0)
- 401 outpatients were waiting over 8 weeks for diagnostics (target is 480)
- No patients waited longer than 14 weeks for therapy care (target is 0)
- There were 3 cases of C.difficile health care acquired infection (target is less than 17)
- There were 14 cases of S.Aureus Bacteraemia health care acquired infection (target is less than 11)
- There were 27 cases of E.Coli Bacteraemia health care acquired infection (target is less than 41)

== Use of the private sector ==
In 2015-6 the board sent 1,599 patients to private sector providers for elective procedures to reduce waiting times because of its lack of capacity at a cost of £3.74 million, compared to 317 in 2014-5 and 160 in 2013–4.

== See also ==
- Swansea Bay Region
