= Hospital radio =

Radio broadcasting service for hospitals

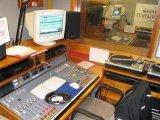
Typical hospital radio studio

Hospital radio is a form of audio broadcasting produced specifically for the in-patients of hospitals, primarily in the United Kingdom. Hospital radio has been found to be beneficial to patients, lifting their mood and aiding recovery.

There are hundreds of hospital radio stations in the UK, almost all are members of the Hospital Broadcasting Association (HBA), which was set up by stations for their mutual benefit and does not govern or run them. Hospital radio stations are staffed and managed by volunteers.

== History ==
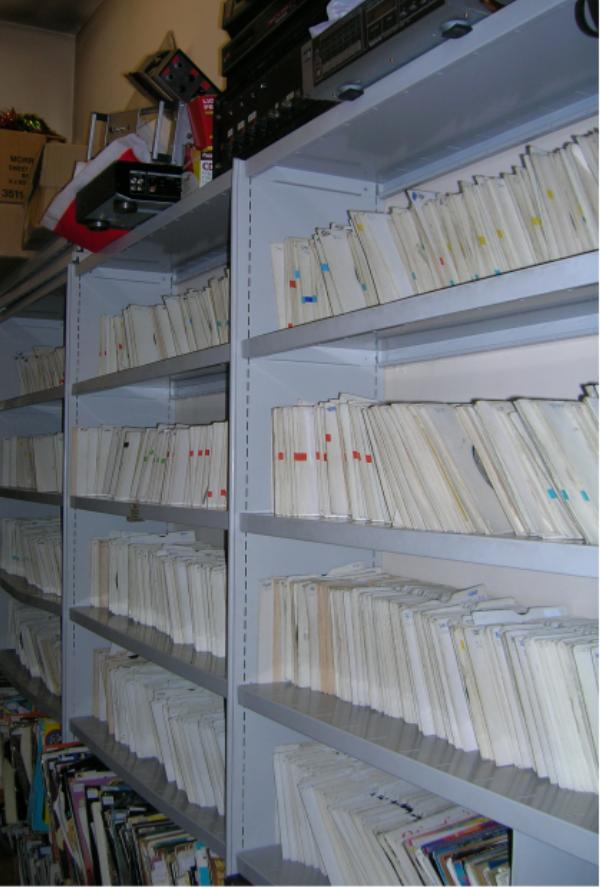
Vinyl LPs in Walsall Hospital Radio's record library

The earliest known hospital radio station officially commenced operation in the Walter Reed General Hospital, Washington, D.C., in May 1919. It was originally planned for installation in 1918 at the American "Base Hospital near Paris"; no evidence has come to light that it was set up there, so it is assumed that the First World War ended before this had been completed and that it was instead installed at Walter Reed.

The first in the United Kingdom was installed at York County Hospital, England, in 1925. Headphones were provided beside 200 beds, and 70 loudspeakers were installed, with patients being able to listen to sports commentaries and church services. Throughout the 1930s radio stations began operating in a handful of other hospitals, with live music supplementing the speech-based programmes. Unsurprisingly, almost no new stations were started during World War II, the sole exception being on Jersey where a service was set up to relay church services, musical recitals, variety shows, and programmes for children to nine hospitals after Wireless receivers had been banned and confiscated by the German occupying authorities.

The spread of hospital radio services picked up slowly in the late 1940s. The 1950s saw a rapid growth in their number in the UK, with similar stations opening in Japan, the Netherlands, and the United States. Many stations now played gramophone music to patients and, with the launch of the cassette tape in 1963, it became easy for presenters to record their programmes for playback at a later date.

Hospital radio stations peaked in number in the 1980s, when up to 300 stations are thought to have been broadcasting on a daily basis. However, as small hospitals closed or merged to form large regional medical centres, hospital radio stations also consolidated into a smaller number of larger organisations. New studios were built, often to a high specification, and in common with commercial radio, hospital stations began to use CDs to play music.

Many now use a computer play-out system and are broadcast to patients bedsides via the TV and radio systems found on patients bedsides. Southend Hospital Radio in particular has switched from broadcasting via play-out systems to broadcasting via internet-enabled devices.

== Transmission ==
In the past, hospital radio tended to be delivered to patients' bedsides by way of a dedicated cable link from the in-house studio to a unit beside every bed. In some cases, this unit would have supplied only the hospital radio station; in others, a choice of broadcast radio stations may also have been available. Today, higher quality bedside entertainment systems supplied by third-party companies such as Hospedia (formerly Patientline), Premier Bedside and HTS (formerly Hospicom) carry many stations in the UK. Others are broadcast from a central radio transmitter, by virtue of a low-powered AM or FM licence. Many hospital radio stations also broadcast over the Internet.

== Organisation ==
Each hospital radio station was founded independently and they are not centrally organised or managed. Almost all are members of the Hospital Broadcasting Association (HBA), which was set up by stations for their mutual benefit and does not govern or run them. Most in the UK are registered charities, others are part of larger organisations such as hospital Leagues of Friends.

Hospital radio stations are staffed and managed by volunteers (more than 2,500 in the UK alone), and each volunteer is commonly attached to a particular weekly programme. Some broadcast, others work to keep the station's record library or computer systems up-to-date, but most also visit the hospital wards, to discuss the music that patients would like to hear, and to provide an opportunity for the latter to converse with a member of non-medical staff.

Many stations use sophisticated computerised playout systems for music and jingles. Live programming is limited to the times that stations' volunteer members can attend studios - generally evenings and weekends - but many stations offer a 24-hour service by using computerised systems to play music and prerecorded programmes at other times.

There are more than 230 hospital radio stations in the UK, and 170 in the Netherlands. Others operate in Germany, France, Norway, Australia, United States and New Zealand.

== Hospital radio awards ==
Each year, the UK-based Hospital Broadcasting Association, invites its member stations to submit entries in ten categories. Entries are assessed by a panel of judges drawn from professional broadcasting.

== Notable people who started in hospital radio ==
- Ken Bruce - presenter, Greatest Hits Radio; worked at HBS Glasgow
- Simon Clark - sports presenter, BBC Look North; worked at Kingstown Radio
- Jill Dando - presenter, BBC; worked at Sunshine Hospital Radio
- Philip Glenister - actor (Life On Mars, Ashes To Ashes)
- Jacqui Oatley - sports presenter, BBC One, Sky Sports, ITV Sports, Fox Sports, The Athletic
- Nick Hodgson - Kaiser Chiefs (drums)
- Aled Haydn Jones - head of BBC Radio 1; worked at Bronglais Hospital Radio
- Tim Key - comedian'; worked at Kidderminster Hospital Radio
- Simon Mayo - presenter, Greatest Hits Radio; worked at Southlands Hospital Radio
- Jason Mohammad - presenter and newsreader, BBC Radio Wales, BBC Radio 2, BBC Radio 5 Live, BBC Wales Today, Wales on Saturday; worked at Radio City 1386AM - The ABM University Health Boards Radio Service in Singleton Hospital, Swansea
- Chris Moyles - presenter, Radio X; worked at WBHS (Wakefield's Broadcast to Hospitals Service)
- Christian O'Connell - presenter, Gold 104.3
- Andrew Peach - presenter, BBC Radio Berkshire
- Karl Pilkington - presenter, actor, author and former radio producer
- Simon Rix - Kaiser Chiefs (bass)
- Phillip Schofield - presenter; worked at Hospital Radio Plymouth
- Amanda Sergeant - presenter, GMTV; worked at Radio City 1386AM - The ABM University Health Boards Radio Service in Singleton Hospital, Swansea
- Huw Stephens - presenter, BBC Radio 1; worked at Rookwood Sound Hospital Radio
- Jeremy Vine - presenter, BBC Radio 2, worked at Durham Hospitals Radio
- Scott Mills - presenter, BBC Radio 2, worked at local hospital in Southampton

== References to hospital radio in popular culture ==
- In Coronation Street - a British ITV soap opera, a new character - Geoff Metcalfe, a volunteer with Weatherfield Hospital Radio - is introduced as a love interest for Audrey Roberts.
- Takin' Over the Asylum - a six-part television drama about the development of a radio station in a psychiatric hospital
- The BBC radio comedy Radio Active featured Michael Fenton Stevens playing an incompetent hospital radio-trained presenter. He was carried over to the TV spin-off KYTV.
- Fictional character Alan Partridge is said to have begun his radio career on Radio Smile at St Luke's Hospital, but left following arguments with patients.
- The League of Gentlemen character Mike King is a DJ at the local hospital.
- Top Gear made a reference to hospital radio, notably "Songs You Can't Play on Hospital Radio". The two songs mentioned were The Verve's "The Drugs Don't Work" and Cutting Crew's "(I Just) Died In Your Arms".
- Friday Night Dinner made a reference to hospital radio, saying Adam Goodman made the music for an advert on hospital radio.
- BBC Scotland's 'Still Game' features Hospital radio in Series 4 Episode 2 (2005) in which character Tam goes away on holiday and main scallywags, Jack and Victor take over from him as D.Js running the local hospital radio service, and acquire themselves quite a fan club.

== See also ==
- List of hospital radio stations in the UK
