= Tonna Hospital =

- Swansea Bay University Health Board
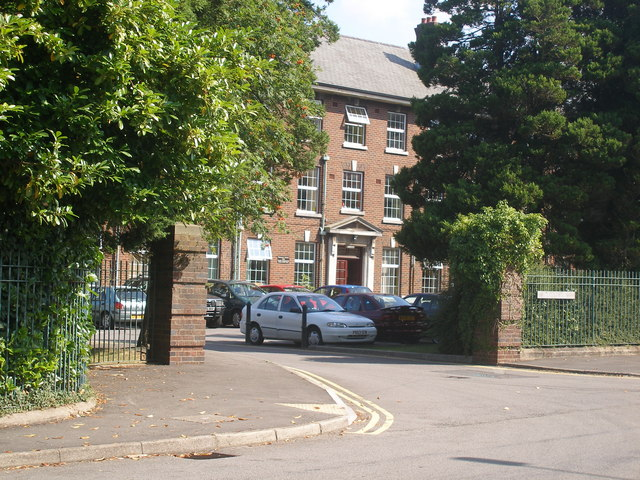
- Tonna Hospital

- Shown in Neath Port Talbot

Geography
- Location: Tonna, Neath, Wales, United Kingdom
- Coordinates: 51.6796°N 3.7652°W

Organisation
- Care system: NHS Wales
- Type: Community hospital

Services
- Emergency department: No

History
- Founded: 1939

Tonna Hospital (Welsh: Ysbyty Tonna) is a psychiatric hospital in Tonna, Neath, Wales. It is managed by Swansea Bay University Health Board.

== History ==
The hospital was officially opened as Neath District Isolation Hospital in March 1939. It joined the National Health Service as a children's hospital in 1948 and subsequently became a psychiatric hospital.
