= Morriston Hospital =

- Swansea Bay University Health Board
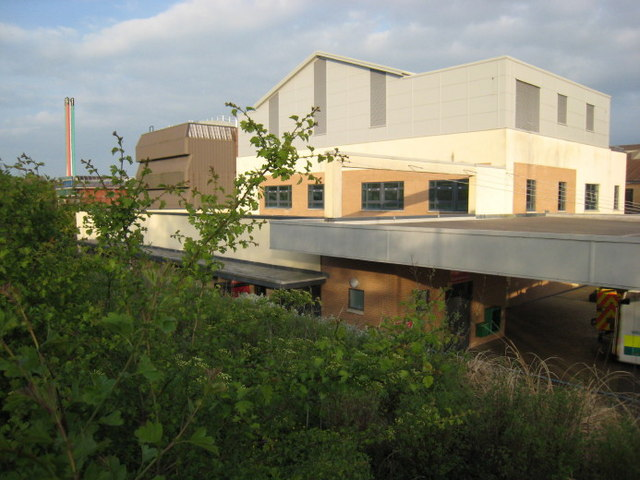
- Morriston Hospital

- Shown in Swansea

Geography
- Location: Heol Maes Eglwys, Cwmrhydyceirw, Swansea, Wales, United Kingdom
- Coordinates: 51°41′03″N 3°56′05″W

Organisation
- Care system: NHS Wales
- Type: Teaching
- Affiliated university: Swansea University; Cardiff University

Services
- Emergency department: Yes
- Beds: 750

History
- Founded: 1942

Links
- Website: sbuhb.nhs.wales/hospitals/our-hospitals/morriston-hospital/

Morriston Hospital (Welsh: Ysbyty Treforys) is a 750-bed hospital located in Cwmrhydyceirw near Morriston in Swansea, Wales. It is managed by Swansea Bay University Health Board. Alongside its role as a district general hospital, Morriston is a teaching hospital for medical students of Swansea University Medical School.

== History ==
The site was originally occupied by Maes-y-Gwernen Hall, a 19th-century farmhouse which was acquired by William Williams MP in 1885. Williams's son, Jeremiah Williams, inherited the house in 1904 and invited David Lloyd George to stay there in 1918. An emergency war-time medical hospital was built on the site in 1942.

By the late 1970s the hospital needed modernising. The design, which was undertaken by William Simpson using a nucleus layout which was capable of expansion, was announced in December 1976 and planning permission granted in March 1978. Construction began in 1981 and the building opened in October 1985.

The Welsh Centre for Burns and Plastic Surgery, which was designed to provide care for the whole population of 2.3 million across West, Mid and South Wales, moved to the site from St Lawrence Hospital, Chepstow in 1994.

In 2015 the Health Board announced plans to expand the site with focus exclusively on the care of the sickest patients. Further to those plans, a new cardiac unit, built at a cost of £6.6 million, opened in August 2016.

== Services and departments ==
The hospital is the site of the major Emergency Department for Swansea and is considered by the Health Board to be the major trauma unit for South West Wales. In addition to general surgical and medical services, Morriston houses the Welsh Centre for Burns and Plastic Surgery.

The hospital successfully trialled the use of robotic process automation to review rheumatology prescriptions in 2019. The Welsh government plans to set up an e-prescribing system.

=== Welsh Centre for Burns and Plastic Surgery ===
The Centre was transferred from St Lawrence Hospital, Chepstow in 1994, and was designated the adult burns lead for the South West UK Burns Network in 2010 covering a population of over 10 million across southern Wales and South West England. The Centre treats both adults and children, while children with extensive injuries are transferred to the Bristol Royal Hospital for Children, and treats over 750 burns patients and over 6,500 plastic surgery patients a year.

=== Welsh Institute of Metabolic and Obesity Surgery ===
The Institute was formed in 2010 and is the only centre for bariatric surgery in Wales. The institute assess all Welsh patient referrals and undertakes surgery for patients in South Wales, with North Wales patients being referred to Salford.

=== Centre for Cardiothoracic Surgery ===
The Centre for Cardiothoracic Surgery was established by Cyril John Evans and Dan Danino. The Centre specialises in operations on the heart, lungs and chest for the South West Wales region.

== Public transport ==
Several bus routes operate at Morriston Hospital, with First Cymru operating most routes, including the frequent route 4 to Singleton Hospital, route 4A to Swansea Bus Station at evenings and Sundays, and route 24 to Swansea Bus Station via Caemawr and Brynhyfryd. Routes 31, 41 and 42 also stop or terminate here occasionally. As for other operators, New Adventure Travel routes 43 and 45 also start here for Swansea, with route 43 running via Singleton Hospital and route 45 being less frequent, South Wales Transport route 46 stops here on its way to Morriston from Gorseinon, and DANSA route 142 stops on its way either to Felindre or Morriston Cross.
