= Singleton Hospital =

- Swansea Bay University Health Board
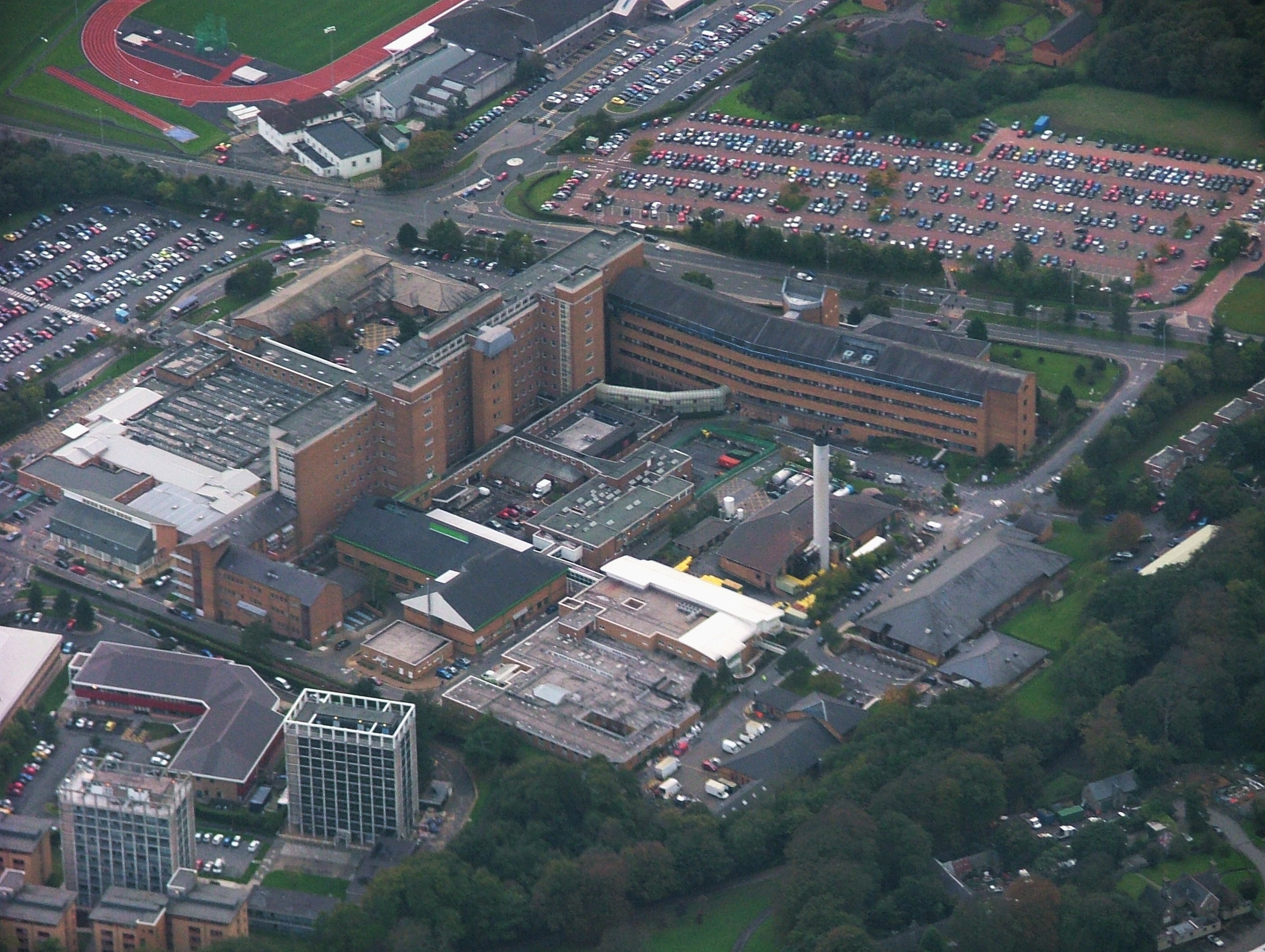
- Singleton Hospital

- Shown in Swansea

Geography
- Location: Singleton Park, Swansea, Wales
- Coordinates: 51°36′34.00″N 3°59′08.00″W

Organisation
- Care system: NHS Wales
- Type: Teaching
- Affiliated university: Swansea University

Services
- Emergency department: No
- Beds: 550

History
- Founded: 1957

Links
- Website: www.wales.nhs.uk/sitesplus/863/page/39264
- Lists: Hospitals in Wales

Singleton Hospital (Welsh: Ysbyty Singleton) is a general hospital in Sketty Lane, Swansea, Wales. It is managed by Swansea Bay University Health Board.

== History ==
The first stage of the hospital, which included outpatients' facilities, was completed in 1957. Work recommenced in 1963, and the second stage, which allowed the closure of the aging Swansea Hospital in St. Helen's Road, was completed in 1968.

== Services ==
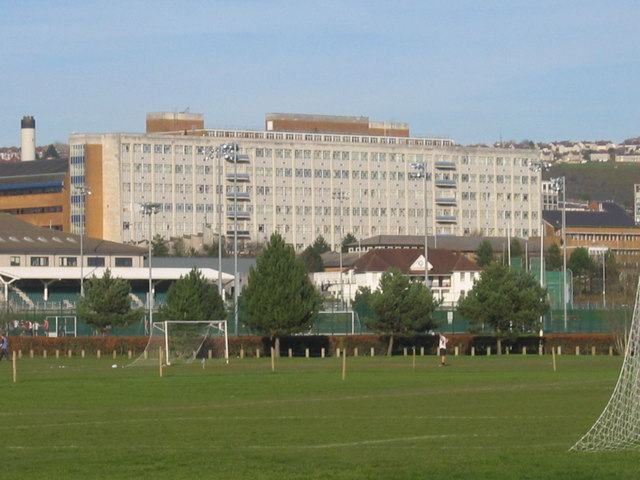
Singleton Hospital

The hospital adjoins the Singleton Park Campus of Swansea University where there is a nursing school and a school of medicine. The Maggie's Cancer Care Centre for South West Wales, which was designed by the Japanese architect Kisho Kurokawa, is located in the grounds of Singleton Hospital. The hospital benefits from its own Hospital Radio Station, Radio City 1386AM, which has been part of the hospital.

== Public transport ==
The hospital is served by a regular bus service between Morriston Hospital and Singleton Hospital.
