= Hospital Broadcasting Association =

Trade Association for British Hospital Radio Volunteers and Stations

- HBA logo
- Abbreviation: HBA
- Formation: 24 September 1992
- Type: Trade association
- Legal status: Registered Charitable Incorporated Organisation (CIO) 1015501
- Purpose: Hospital radio in the UK
- Region served: UK
- Members: 160 member-organisations
- Chair: Sam Smette
- Main organ: Executive Committee
- Affiliations: NHS
- Website: HBA

The Hospital Broadcasting Association (HBA) supports the 160 independent hospital broadcasting organisations serving hospitals, hospices and nursing homes in the UK. The vast majority of these organisations provide hospital radio services through a variety of broadcast medium as well as a few hospital television services.

HBA's patron is the former Head of Presentation at BBC Radio 2, Alan Dedicoat, who before joining the BBC started his radio life in the hospital radio "trade".

== Function ==
=== Advice and guidance ===
HBA provides advice and guidance to the management of the stations on all aspects of running a hospital broadcasting organisation. This is available via its website, its members' magazine, at national conferences, regional events and in response to specific enquiries. This expertise is vital to the stations, as many of a station's members will not have had previous experience in either broadcasting, running or managing an organisation.

The HBA also provides regular training events for those involved with the associations member stations; attracting guest speakers who have a wealth of professional experience in radio broadcasting and interview techniques, radio technology or the finer points of computer based broadcasting software. In addition HBA offers training and support on numerous administration elements of managing a charity.

=== National representation ===
HBA represents hospital broadcasting at a national level, engaging with appropriate national organisations such as:

- the NHS
- the Dept of Health
- Ofcom
- the copyright collecting societies PPL, PRS and MCPS
- the charity regulators Charity Commission and OSCR
- the government's Office of the Third Sector

== National Hospital Radio Awards ==
The HBA stages the National Hospital Radio Awards annually to encourage volunteers to produce better programmes, recognising volunteers within the HBA and its member stations that deserve recognition for going the extra mile in their work. The awards are presented at the HBA Annual National Conference held in the Spring of each year. for association members and the general public to see in full.

=== 2022 ===
National Hospital Radio Awards 2022.

Presented: 29 August 2022 online.
Station of the Year
Gold: Radio Ysbyty Gwynedd; Silver: Radio Tyneside; Bronze: Radio Brockley
Best Male Presenter	Best Female Presenter
Gold: Connor Morgans; Silver: Jake McElvogue; Bronze: Neil Ogden	Gold: Jo Hobbis; Silver: Adelle Davies; Bronze: Vicky Pinder
Best Speech Package	Best Special Event
Gold: Radio Brockley; Silver: Bath Radio; Bronze: Radio Tyneside	Gold: The Hospital Broadcasting Service; Silver: Winchester Radio; Bronze: Radio Glamorgan
Best Newcomer	Best Specialist Music Programme
Gold: Hannah Gilchrist; Silver: Tiz Harris; Bronze: Claire Cummins	Gold: HWD Hospital Radio; Silver: Hospital Radio Plymouth; Bronze: The Hospital Broadcasting Service
Best Programme with Multiple Presenters	Best Station Promotion
Gold: The Heff & Beth Show - Hospital Radio Medway; Silver: Steve & Jen Unplanned -Arrowe Sound; Bronze: Daniel & Mark's LGBT Pride Hours - Harrogate Hospital Radio	Gold: Radio Glamorgan; Silver: Southend Hospital Radio; Bronze: Harrogate Hospital Radio
Recognising Innovation Across Hospital Radio	The John Whitney Outstanding Contribution Award
Gold: Radio Hillingdon	Gold: Paul Blitz
