= List of schools in Neath Port Talbot =

This is a list of schools in Neath Port Talbot in Wales.

== Primary schools ==
- Aldemandem Davies CW Primary School
- Alltwen Primary School
- Baglan Primary School
- Blaenbaglan Primary School
- Blaendulais Primary School
- Blaenhonddan Primary School
- Bryn Primary School
- Bryncoch CW Primary School
- Brynhyfryd Primary School
- Catwg Primary School
- Central Infant School
- Central Junior School
- Cillfriw Primary School
- Coedffranc Primary School
- Coed Hirwaun Primary School
- Creunant Primary School
- Crymlyn Primary School
- Crynallt Primary School
- Eastern Primary School
- Gnoll Primary School
- Groes Primary School
- Llangiwg Primary School
- Llansawel Primary School
- Melin Infants School
- Melin Junior School
- Mynachlog Nedd Junior School
- Neath Abbey Infants School
- Rhos Primary School
- Sandfields Primary School
- St Joseph's RC Junior School
- St Joseph's RC Primary School
- St Therese's Catholic Primary School
- Tonmawr Primary School
- Tonnau Primary School
- Tywyn Primary School
- Ysgol Gynradd Gymraeg Blaendulais
- Ysgol Gynradd Gymraeg Castell Nedd
- Ysgol Gynradd Gymraeg Cwmnedd
- Ysgol Gynradd Gymraeg Pontardawe
- Ysgol Gynradd Gymraeg Rhos Afan
- Ynys Fach Primary School
- Ynysmardey Primary School

== Secondary schools ==
- Cefn Saeson Comprehensive School
- Cwmtawe Community School
- Dwr-y-Felin Comprehensive School
- Llangatwg Comprehensive School
- St Joseph's Catholic School and Sixth Form Centre
- Ysgol Bae Baglan
- Ysgol Gymraeg Ystalyfera Bro Dur
- Ysgol Cwm Brombil

== Special schools ==
- Cwmtawe School
- Velindre Community School
- Ysgol Hendre Residential School
- Ysgol Maes Y Coed

== Further education colleges ==
- Neath Port Talbot College

== Former schools ==
- Central Comprehensive School
- Cwrt Sart Comprehensive School, closed 2016
- Cymer Afan Comprehensive School, opened 1932, closed 2019
- Dyffryn Comprehensive School, opened 1912, closed 2018
- Glan Afan Comprehensive School, opened 1896, closed 2016
- Rhydhir Secondary Modern School, opened 1952, closed 1973 (site was used by Dwr-y-Felin until 2012)
- Sandfields Comprehensive School
- Traethmelyn Primary School
