= Andrew Rhodes =

British civil servant (born 1977)

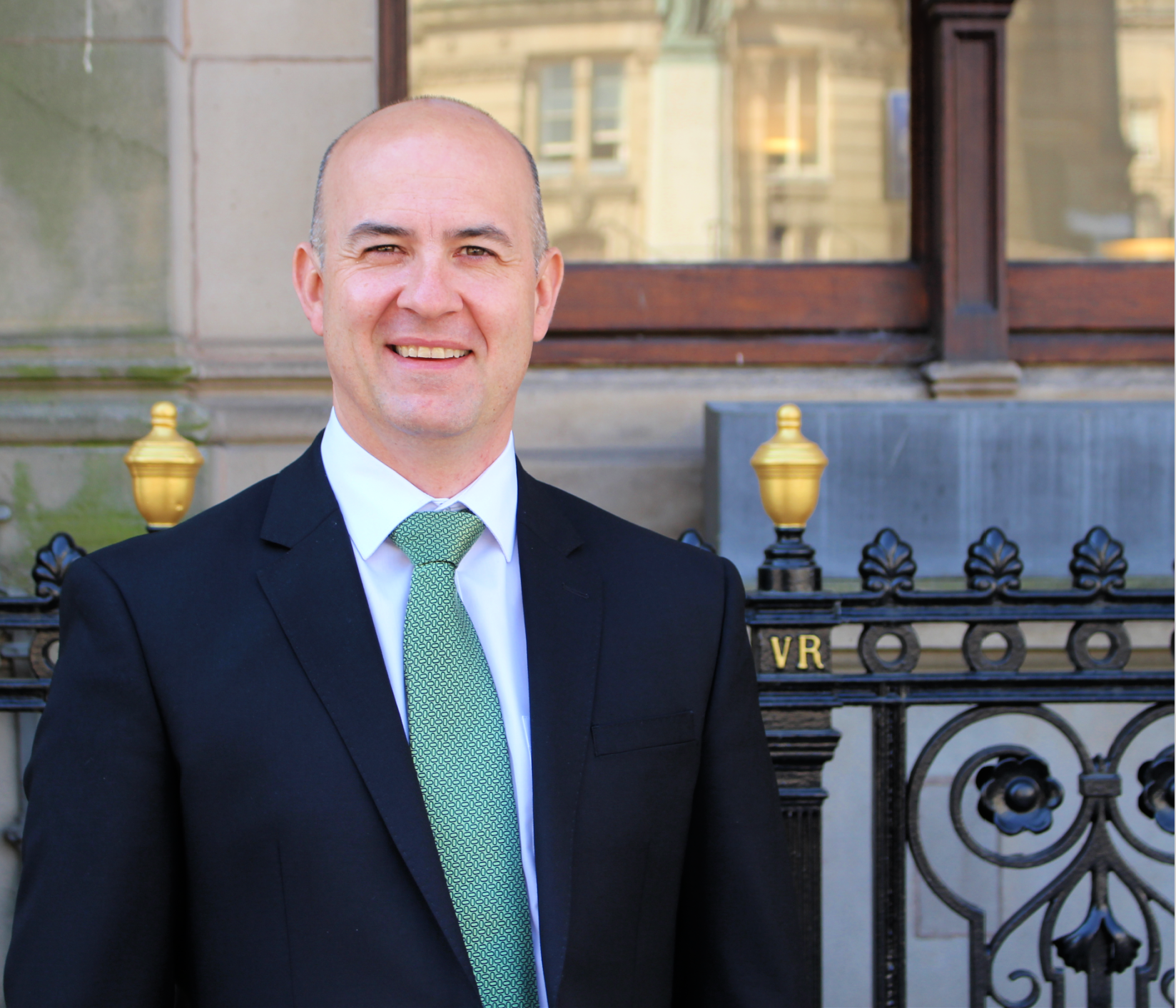
- Andrew Rhodes outside the Gambling Commission, Birmingham in 2021

Personal details
- Born: 10 October 1977 (age 48) Neath, Wales
- Education: Cefn Saeson; University of Wales Swansea

Andrew Rhodes (born October 10th, 1977) is a British administrator. He is currently the Chief Executive of the Gambling Commission — the United Kingdom (UK)'s regulator for the gambling industry. He was formerly a senior British Civil servant, occupying the largest operational director general role in the UK Government.

== Early life and education ==
Rhodes was born on 10 October 1977, in Neath, South Wales. He was educated at Cefn Saeson Comprehensive School, followed by Neath College. He studied history at Swansea University, graduating with a B.A.(Hons) degree in 1996, which was followed by an M.Phil. in 2003.

== Career ==
Rhodes often spoke at civil service and other events regarding social mobility. He was open about coming from 300 years of coal miners, being the first person in his family to go to university and having lived in a household often dependent on benefits. His rise through the ranks of the Civil Service was very rapid — reaching the Senior Civil Service at 30, Director by 32 and occupying the largest Director-General position in the British government by 38.

Rhodes worked his way through university and attained his first managerial position at NTL in 2000, working as a contact centre team leader. He joined PricewaterhouseCoopers as a management consultant in 2001, but left the following year as the company ran into difficulty amid a slowdown in the IT industry. He worked for Bridgend County Borough Council between 2002 and 2005, before joining the Civil Service at the Driver and Vehicle Licensing Agency (DVLA).

At the DVLA, Rhodes became responsible for all electronic services, making it one of the largest online presences in the process. He brokered an innovative partnership with SEAT cars, which saw the car manufacturer supply 69 cars to DVLA, at no cost, over two years. This new promotional approach was unusual in government and was highly successful, winning both the National Business Awards in 2008 and the European Business Awards in 2009, both for Best Marketing Strategy. By the time he left DVLA, Rhodes had been promoted to a director and had held the position of customer services director, followed by director of products and services.

Rhodes joined the Food Standards Agency as director of operations in 2010, after the merger with the Meat Hygiene Service. This was the first time such a broad operational role had been created, effectively with responsibility for all of the UK's food safety controls. After two and a half years at the agency, Rhodes was appointed as the lead official and chief investigating officer who would probe into the 2013 horse meat scandal. He later became the chief operating officer at the agency.

In 2013, Rhodes was appointed as an independent member of the Royal Air Force Air Command Audit Committee, and served for seven years until 2020.

In 2015, Rhodes joined the Department for Work and Pensions as benefits director, soon after being given the expanded responsibility of benefit services director with 22,000 staff and the management of the largest virtual telephony network in Europe.

In March 2016, Rhodes was appointed Director-General, Operations — the largest director-general position in the UK Government in terms of staffing. He became responsible for some 72,000 civil servants, close to one-fifth of the entire Civil Service, and the delivery of all benefits, pensions, employment, and child maintenance services in the UK, spending approximately 11% of GDP at the time — over £170 billion. On appointment, Rhodes became one of the youngest directors-general in the history of the UK Civil Service. In 2017, John Manzoni, Chief Executive of the Civil Service, appointed Rhodes Head of the Operational Delivery Profession. Continual reductions in senior posts and organizational structures meant that when Rhodes took on the role of Head of Profession alongside his role as Director-General, Operations, what had once been two Second Permanent Secretaries and multiple Chief Executives was now just one Director-General with a remit larger than that of many government departments and the monetary equivalent of the 47th-largest economy in the world.

In April 2018, Rhodes left the Civil Service and was appointed Registrar and Chief Operating Officer at Swansea University, serving in the role for three years at the university where he had previously been a student.

In May 2021, Rhodes left Swansea University after three years to join the Gambling Commission in June 2021, as Interim Chief Executive. Andrew Rhodes was officially confirmed as the permanent chief executive officer at the Gambling Commission in May 2022, with the news of his permanent appointment first covered in The Guardian newspaper in January 2022.

The online gambling industry in the UK is one of the most liberalised and largest in the world. The Gambling Commission is the UK regulator of the gambling industry and is a non-departmental public body consisting of a board of commissioners, with a chief executive responsible for the effective running of the Commission. The Commission is sponsored by the Department for Culture, Media and Sport. Due to the arm's-length status of the Gambling Commission, the people who work there are government servants but not civil servants.

In August 2021, Andrew Rhodes was also named as Chair of the Swansea City AFC Foundation. The foundation, renamed from the Swansea City AFC Community Trust in 2021, is a charity offering sports and outreach services in the heart of South Wales and is the charitable arm of Swansea City AFC.
