= Newy =

Newy may refer to:

- Newcastle, New South Wales, a city in Australia
  - Newy 87.8 FM, a radio station
- New York Penn Station, Via Rail code: NEWY

== See also ==
- Newi, a software architecture for software componentry
- Niue, a South Pacific island country
