= David Shufflebotham =

Welsh cricketer (born 1968)

Personal information
- Full name: David Howell Shufflebotham
- Born: 11 March 1968 (age 58); Neath, Glamorgan, Wales
- Batting: Right-handed
- Bowling: Right-arm medium

Domestic team information
- Years: Team
- 1989–1990: Cambridge University

Career statistics
| Competition | First-class |
|---|---|
| Matches | 9 |
| Runs scored | 149 |
| Batting average | 21.28 |
| 100s/50s | –/– |
| Top score | 29 |
| Balls bowled | 924 |
| Wickets | 7 |
| Bowling average | 81.71 |
| 5 wickets in innings | – |
| 10 wickets in match | – |
| Best bowling | 3/60 |
| Catches/stumpings | 1/– |
- Source: Cricinfo, 10 January 2022

David Howell Shufflebotham (born 11 March 1968) is a Welsh former first-class cricketer.

The son of Terry Shufflebotham, who played Second Eleven cricket for Glamorgan, he was born at Neath in March 1968. He was educated at Neath Grammar School, before going up to Magdalene College, Cambridge. While studying at Cambridge, he played first-class cricket for Cambridge University Cricket Club in 1989 and 1990, making nine appearances. Playing as an all-rounder in the Cambridge side, he scored 149 runs in his nine matches, at an average of 21.28 and a highest score of 29. With his medium pace bowling he took 7 wickets at an expensive bowling average of 81.71, with best figures of 3 for 60.
