= Bryan Richards =

- Full name: Thomas Bryan Richards
- Born: 23 November 1932 Skewen, Wales
- Died: 16 December 2023 (aged 91) Rugby, England
- School: Neath Grammar School
- University: Swansea University; University of Cambridge
- Occupation: Teacher

Rugby union career
- Position: Outside-half
International career
Years	Team	Apps	(Points)
1960	Wales	1	(0)

Thomas Bryan Richards (23 November 1932 — 16 December 2023) was a Welsh international rugby union player.

== Biography ==
Born in Skewen, Richards attended Neath Grammar School and was a Welsh Schools representative cricketer, later playing cricket for the Glamorgan 2nd XI. He went on to study at Swansea University, during which time he played rugby for Neath, then attended Jesus College, Cambridge, winning a blue in the 1955 Varsity Match.

Richards played for Swansea on his return to Wales and served as club captain in the 1958–59 season. He gained a Wales cap as an outside-half in a 1960 Five Nations Championship match against France in Cardiff. He was the last outside half to wear the number 6 shirt for Wales and the shirt was restored by Rebecca Bissonnet on The Repair Shop.

A teacher by profession, he taught at Christ College Brecon and was involved there with rugby; he was head of economics at Dulwich College and a housemaster at Rugby School.

== See also ==
- List of Wales national rugby union players
