= Neath Town Hall =

Municipal Building in Neath, Wales

- Neuadd y Dref Castell-nedd (Welsh)
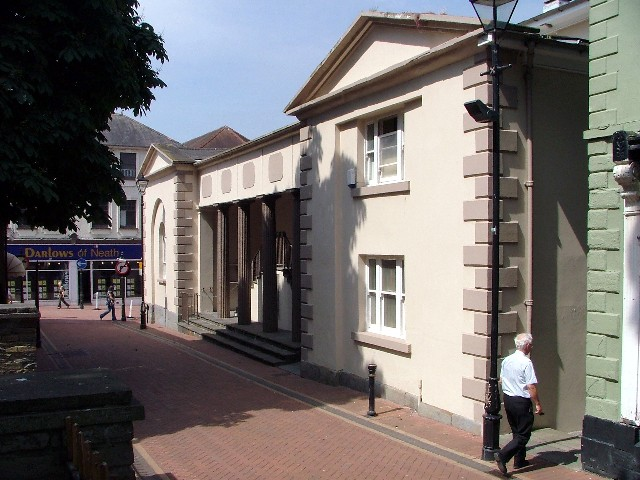
- Neath Town Hall

- Shown in Neath Port Talbot
- 51.6640°N 3.8047°W
- Location: Church Place, Neath

History
- Built: 1821

Site notes
- Architect: W. Bowen
- Architectural style: Neoclassical style

Listed Building – Grade II
- Official name: Old Town Hall
- Designated: 16 August 1970
- Reference no.: 11778

Neath Town Hall (Welsh: Neuadd y Dref Castell-nedd) is a municipal building in Church Place, Neath, South Wales. The town hall, which was the headquarters of Neath Borough Council, is a Grade II listed building.

== History ==
The first town hall in Neath, which was designed with arcading on the ground floor to allow markets to be held and with an assembly room on the first floor, was erected in Old Market Street (originally known as the High Street) in the 14th century. It was restored in the first half of the 16th century and benefitted from its own lock-up for petty criminals.

In the early 19th century, civic leaders decided that the town needed a more substantial building. The foundation stone for the new building was laid on 22 June 1820. It was designed by W. Bowen of Swansea in the neoclassical style, built of brick with a stucco coating at a cost of £2,250 and was completed in 1821. The design involved a symmetrical main frontage with seven bays facing onto Church Place with the end bays projected forward as pavilions; the central section of five bays featured four Doric order columns supporting an entablature and a cornice, while the end bays contained sash windows with triangular pediments above. Behind the columns in the central section was a stone staircase leading up to the main entrance on the first floor, and, at the back of the entrance block, there was a taller two-storey rear block. Internally, the principal rooms were the corn market on the ground floor of the rear block and the council chamber, grand jury room and courtroom on the first floor.

In 1830, the local church minister chose the town hall as his venue to advocate petitioning the UK Parliament for the abolition of slavery and, in 1848, Joseph Tregelles Price, the Quaker ironmaster of Neath Abbey Ironworks, who was also a prominent philanthropist, chose the town hall as his venue to advocate petitioning the UK Parliament for "the maintenance of peace" in the context of the diplomatic crisis which ultimately led to the Crimean War.

The town became a municipal borough with the town hall as its headquarters in 1835. However, by the 1880s it was becoming too small for the council's needs and civic leaders decided that Gwyn Hall in Orchard Street should become the local seat of government after it was completed in 1888. The ground floor of the rear block was subsequently used as a fire station before being enclosed for retail use. The building was requisitioned for use as a base for two British Red Cross detachments as well as for use as a temporary home for Belgian refugees during the First World War. The 21st century saw the town hall becoming an approved venue for marriages and civil partnership ceremonies.

Works of art in the town hall include a painting by Percy Gleaves depicting David Lloyd George receiving the Freedom of the Borough of Neath in 1920.
