= Dwr-y-Felin Comprehensive School =

Ysgol Gyfun Dŵr-Y-Felin

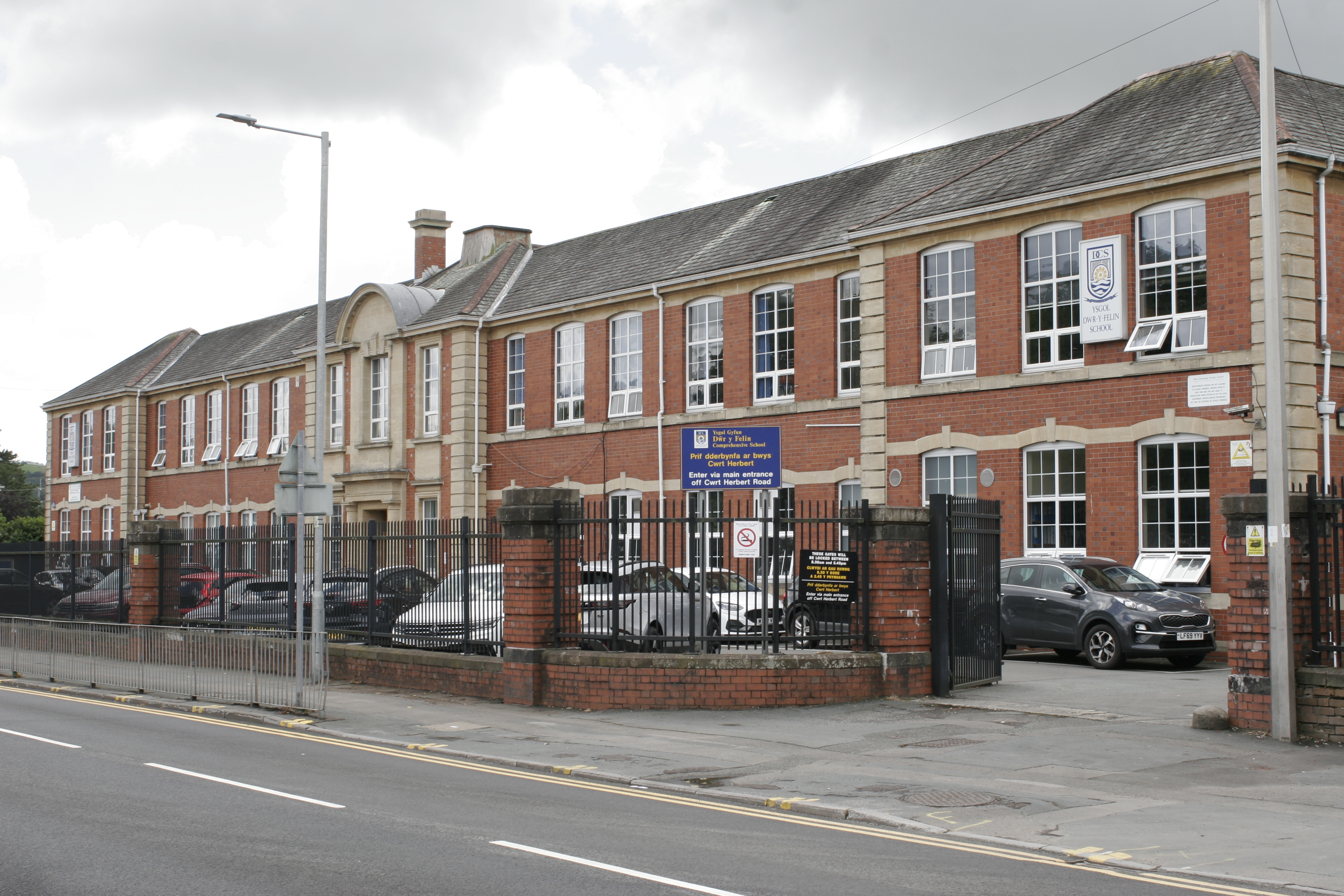

Location
- Dwr-y-Felin Road; Neath, West Glamorgan, SA10 7RE; Wales; 51°39′57″N 3°48′48″W

Information
- Type: Comprehensive
- Motto: Nid da lle gellir gwell (it’s not good enough if it isn’t your best)
- Established: 1973
- Local authority: Neath Port Talbot
- Department for Education URN: 401786 Tables
- Head teacher: Ceri Richmond
- Gender: Coeducational
- Age: 11 to 16
- Enrolment: c. 1200
- Former name: Neath Grammar School
- Website: www.dwryfelinschool.org

Dwr-y-Felin Comprehensive School (Welsh: Ysgol Gyfun Dŵr-y-Felin) is a comprehensive school in the Cwrt Herbert community of the town of Neath in South Wales, Wales. The school badge shows a watermill and mill stream in reference to the school name, in English 'water of the mill' or 'mill stream'. The badge also uses the acronym DCS or DYF to represent Dwr-y-Felin Comprehensive School.

== Admissions and location ==
The school is co-educational, for pupils aged 11–16. As a comprehensive school, there are no admission criteria beyond residence in the local catchment area

It is situated on Dwr-y-Felin Road, off the A474 next to Neath Port Talbot College (former Neath College before 1996) and close to the former Nidum Roman fort.

== History ==
=== Former schools ===
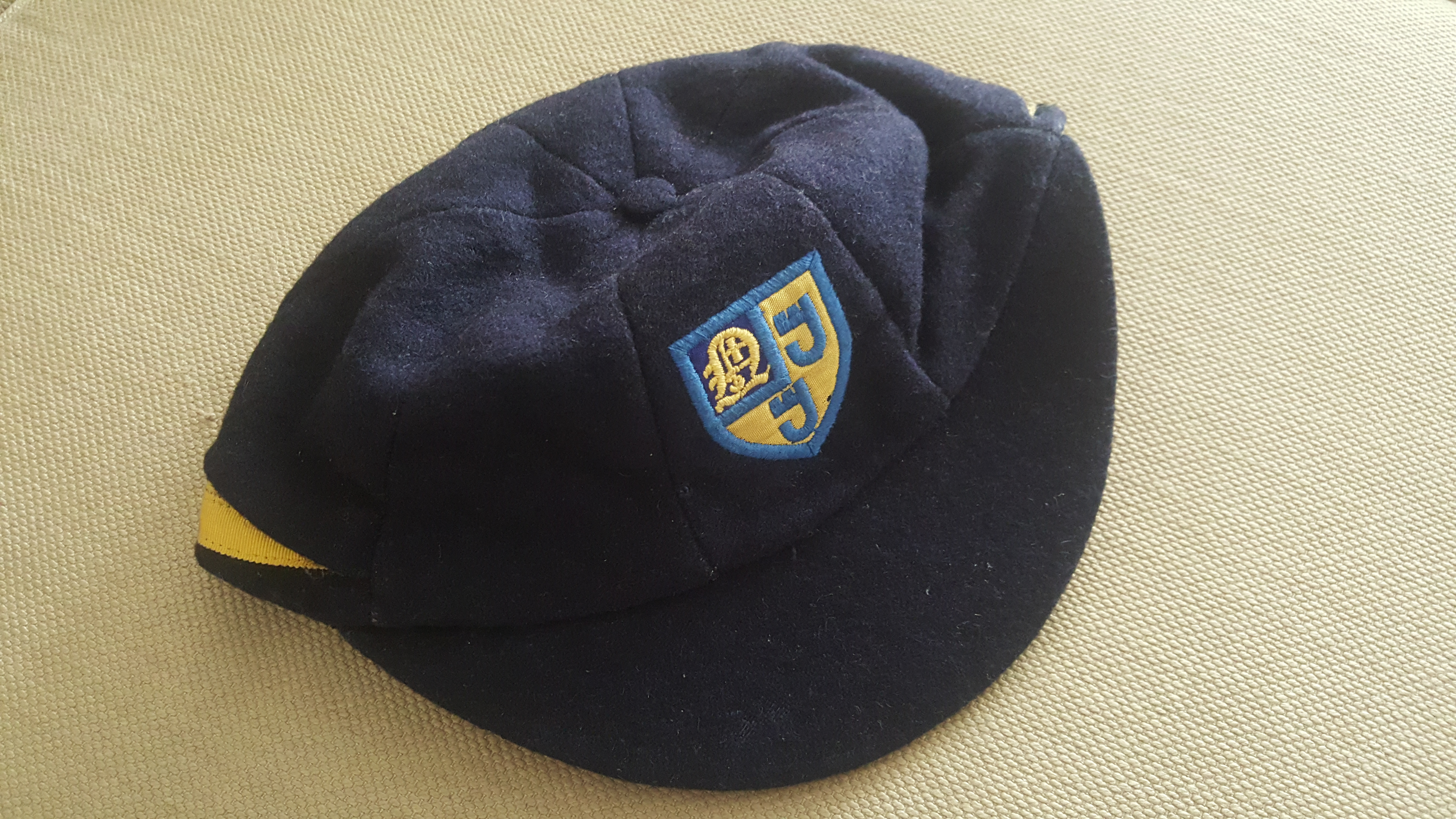
School cap Neath Boys' Grammar School

The school can trace its origin back to 1894 when, following the Welsh Intermediate Education Act 1889, an Intermediate and Technical School for 200 scholars was established to serve the population of Neath. The names Neath Boys Grammar School and Neath Girls Grammar School were adopted following the post-WWII introduction of the tripartite education system. Prior to that the schools had the name 'county school' as they were administered by the local (county) authority; "Neath County School" can still be seen over the old staff entrance to the school. In 1953, also under the tripartite education system, Rhydhir Secondary Modern School was established.

Neath Boys Grammar School was noted for producing many well-known rugby players and for its music (in particular an orchestra composed of now very successful and notable musicians). Neath Girls' Grammar School was also notable for its music and the achievements of its alumnae. The grammar school motto was Gorau Arf, Arf Dysg ("The best weapon is the weapon of learning").

=== Comprehensive ===
The school opened its doors for the first time in September 1973 following the ending of grammar school education in the Neath area. The Upper School was housed on Dwr-y-Felin Road in the buildings of the former Neath Grammar School adjacent to Neath Port Talbot College, while the Lower School was situated on the campus of the former Rhydhir Secondary Modern school in Longford, Neath Abbey. Since a site amalgamation which took place on 6 September 2012, all school facilities are located at the former Upper School, with an extra building having been constructed at a cost of 9.7 million pounds.

=== Headteachers ===
The inaugural Headteacher was Dr R. J. Graham, previously the Headteacher of Neath Grammar School for Boys. Mai Edwards (1926–2017), the Headmistress of Neath Girls' Grammar School, became Headteacher of the new Cefn Saeson Comprehensive School. Dr Graham left circa 1987–89. Dr D. Stokes was the Headteacher of Dwr y Felin Comprehensive School from the mid-1980s until August 2002.

Mr N Stacey was appointed Headteacher in September 2002. He left in 2012 and was replaced by Mrs S E Handley. She left in 2019 and was replaced by Mrs P J Peet. As of 2024, the head is Miss Ceri Richmond.

== Notable former pupils ==
=== Neath Boys Grammar School ===
- Gordon Back, musician
- John Bevan, Wales international rugby player and coach
- Kevin Bowring, rugby player and Wales international coach
- Cynog Dafis, Plaid Cymru MP from 1992 to 2000 for Ceredigion (Ceredigion and Pembroke North from 1992 to 1997)
- Arthur Hickman, Wales international rugby player, later league professional
- Lynn Hopkins, rugby league professional
- T. G. H. James, Egyptologist, Editor from 1960 to 1970 of the Journal of Egyptian Archaeology
- Roy John, Wales international soccer player
- Tony Lewis, England and Glamorgan cricket captain, writer and broadcaster, chairman of Wales Tourist Board, chairman of Welsh National Opera
- Clive Leyman, chief aerodynamicist (with Jean Rech) of Concorde
- Courtney Meredith, Wales international rugby player
- Clive Norling, international rugby union referee
- Harry Parr-Davies, songwriter and composer
- David (Dai) Richards, Wales international rugby player
- Michael Roberts, Conservative MP from 1970 to 1974 for Cardiff North, and from 1974 to 1983 for Cardiff North West
- Oliver Sims, computer scientist
- David Shufflebotham, cricketer
- Brian Thomas, Cambridge Rugby Blue (Christ's) and Wales international rugby player
- Gwyn Thomas, cricketer
- Andrew Vicari, artist
- Cyril Walters, England test cricketer and captain

=== Neath Girls Grammar School ===
- Della Jones, mezzo-soprano, sang Rule, Britannia! at the 1993 Last Night of the Proms (with John Tomlinson)
- Melveena McKendrick (nee Jones), Professor of Spanish Golden-Age Literature, Culture and Society from 1999 to 2008, and married to Neil McKendrick

=== Dwr-y-Felin Comprehensive School ===
- Chris Bromham, stuntman
- Katherine Jenkins – international opera singer
- Paul James – Wales international rugby player, Ospreys
- Andrew Matthews-Owen, pianist and Professor of Collaborative Piano
- David Melding, Conservative AM for South Wales Central
- Craig Mitchell – Wales international rugby player, Ospreys
- David Pickering – Wales international rugby player and current chairman Welsh Rugby Union
- Jonathan Spratt – Wales international rugby player, Ospreys
- Ashley Beck – Wales international rugby player, Ospreys
- Christian Loader – Wales former international rugby player and currently teaching in Dwr-Y-Felin
