= Newspaper misprints =

Newspaper misprints may refer to:

- Typographical error
- Newspaper misprints, a humorous mini-section in Private Eye magazine.
