= Rech =

Rech may refer to:

== People ==
- Almine Rech, French art dealer
- Anthony Rech (born 1992), French ice hockey player
- Bianca Rech (born 1981), German football player
- Erich Rech, Iron Cross recipient
- Fernando Rech (born 1974), Brazilian football player
- Heribert Rech (born 1950), German lawyer and politician
- Jean Rech (1931–2017), French aerodynamicist
- Louis Rech (1926–2012), Luxembourgish politician
- Léo Ortiz (born 1996), Brazilian football player

== Places ==
- Rech, Rhineland-Palatinate, Germany

== Other ==
- Rech (newspaper)
