= Clive Norling =

Welsh rugby union referee (born 1950)

- Born: April 1950 (age 76) Neath, Wales
- School: Neath Grammar School for Boys

Rugby union career
Refereeing career
Years	Competition	Apps
1987	Rugby World Cup	
1977-1992	Test Matches	35

Clive Norling (born 5 April 1950) is a former Welsh international rugby union referee. Norling was, when officiating, one of the world's most experienced referees. He refereed in a then-record 35 international tests prior to his retirement in 1992. This included the quarter final, Fiji v France, of the inaugural Rugby World Cup. In 1998, he took over as the Welsh Director of Refereeing, a post he held until resigning in June 2003.

Off the field, in 1974 Norling completed a BA Degree in Business Studies at Portsmouth Polytechnic. He then added to that qualification in 1996 by obtaining a MSc degree in Small Business and Entrepreneurship from Stirling University. He taught at the Swansea Institute of Higher Education, from 1986 to 1998. Unfortunately in 2004, he succumbed to a crippling clinical depression, which left him feeling suicidal. The depression continued until 2011. Norling credits his wife, Mair, and BBC reporter Phil Steele for helping him recover. His recovery was completed when he achieved a Doctor of Philosophy degree from Cardiff University in 2014. His research thesis was based on 'Strategic Management in Non-Profit Organisations'. In his retirement he has been the president of Birchgrove RFC since 2012, and enjoys singing with the Pontarddulais Male Choir. He has no interest in the professional rugby union game.
