= Gwyn Jones (physicist) =

Welsh physicist

Gwyn Owain Jones CBE (29 March 1917 – 3 July 2006) was a Welsh physicist and academic, who moved from being a professor at the University of London to become director of the National Museum of Wales.

== Life ==
Jones was born in Cardiff on 29 March 1917. He was educated at Port Talbot County School and Monmouth School before winning a Meyricke scholarship to Jesus College, Oxford to study physics. He graduated in 1939 and became a Research Fellow at the University of Sheffield, obtaining his PhD on the physics of glass. (He published Glass in 1956.) He became a member of the secret British nuclear weapons research programme, code-name Tube Alloys, in 1942, moving back to Oxford in 1946 as a Nuffield Foundation Research Fellow at the Clarendon Laboratory before becoming Reader in Experimental Physics (1949) and then Professor of Physics (1953) at Queen Mary College in the University of London.

As a physicist, Jones had a particular interest in work at very low temperatures (close to absolute zero). His department in London was one of the few places where experiments could be carried out within a couple of degrees of absolute zero, using helium as a refrigerant. Jones designed some equipment, made out of a motorcycle engine, to liquefy small amounts of helium for use by individual researchers, as opposed to the large-scale liquifiers used in other laboratories. Although it carried out research in various topics in physics, the department at Queen Mary College under Jones became known for its specialisation in solid-state and low temperature physics, with Jones himself publishing many scientific papers in the field.

He caused some surprise by leaving academia and becoming director of the National Museum of Wales in 1968, holding the post until 1977. He also served as chairman of the Welsh Academy, as a governor of the Commonwealth Institute, a member of the Atomic Scientists Association (of which he was a co-founder) and a member of the Pugwash Conferences on Science and World Affairs. He was awarded a CBE in 1978 for his service to Wales. He died on 3 July 2006.
