= David Carpanini =

British painter

'Through the memory of their eloquence' - acrylic by David Carpanini

David Lawrence Carpanini (born 1946) is a Welsh artist, etcher, teacher and printmaker whose drawings, paintings and etchings are mostly concerned with the natural and industrial landscapes of South Wales. He was President of the Royal Society of Painter-Printmakers (1995–2003) and was Professor of Art at the University of Wolverhampton (1992–2000).

Carpanini was born of Italian and Welsh descent in the Afan Valley in Glamorgan in Wales in 1946, the son of Lawrence Carpanini and Gwenllian (née Thomas), and was educated at Glan Afan Grammar School in Port Talbot. He trained as an artist at Gloucestershire College of Art, the Royal College of Art and the University of Reading. In 1969 he won the British Institution Awards Committee Annual Scholarship for engraving, going on to teach Art at the Kingham Hill School from 1972 until December 1978, and at Oundle School from 1979 to 1986. He was Head of Art and Design at Wolverhampton Polytechnic, and became Professor when it gained university status in 1992, a post he held until 2000. He has exhibited regularly at the Royal Academy of Arts, and has exhibited at other major venues in the UK and abroad.

Carpanini has exhibited at various galleries including the Piccadilly Gallery, the New Arts Centre and the Bankside Gallery. He has held solo exhibitions at the Welsh Arts Council, the Warwick Arts Festival (1986), the Mostyn Gallery (1988), the Rhondda Heritage Gallery (1989 and 1994), Walsall Museum (1989) and St David's Hall, Cardiff (1999) among others.

He was elected RE (1982) (ARE 1979); RWA (1983) (ARWA 1977); RBA (1976); NEAC (1983); RCA 1992; Hon RWS (1996), and Hon RBSA (2000).

His paintings are held in the collections of the Royal Collection, the National Museum of Wales in Cardiff, the National Library of Wales in Aberystwyth, Newport Museum and Art Gallery, Glynn Vivian Art Gallery, British National Oil Corporation, University of Swansea, the Rhondda Heritage Park, The Welsh Mining Museum; British Steel, Rank Xerox, Bangor University, Coleg Harlech, the National Coal Board, the Royal College of Art, the Fitzwilliam Museum in Cambridge, the Ashmolean Museum in Oxford and by private collectors around the world.

His work has been the subject of three documentaries: Everyone - A Special Kind of Artist - David Carpanini - Channel 4 (1984); David Carpanini - Artist of Wales - HTV (1987) and A Word in Your Eye - HTV (1997).

David Carpanini is married to the watercolourist Jane Carpanini (born 1949); they live in Leamington Spa.
