= Neath =

Town in south Wales

Neath: Welsh: Castell-nedd
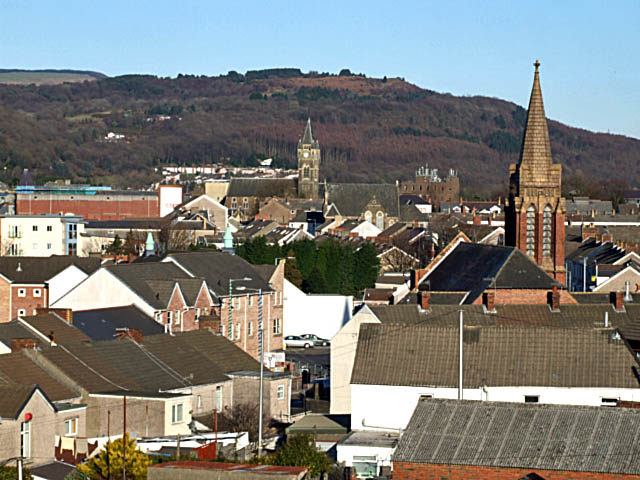
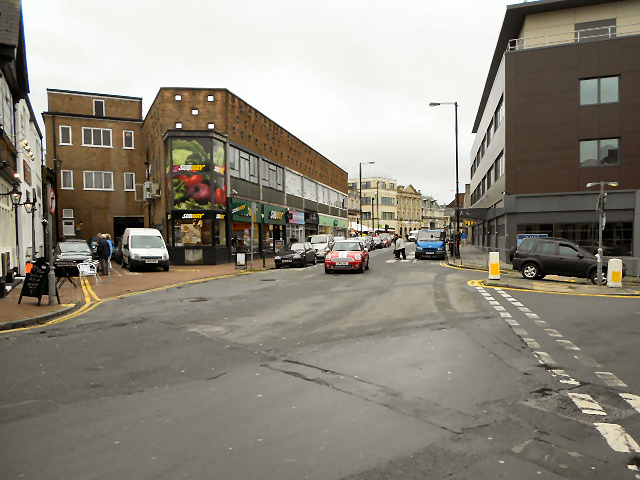
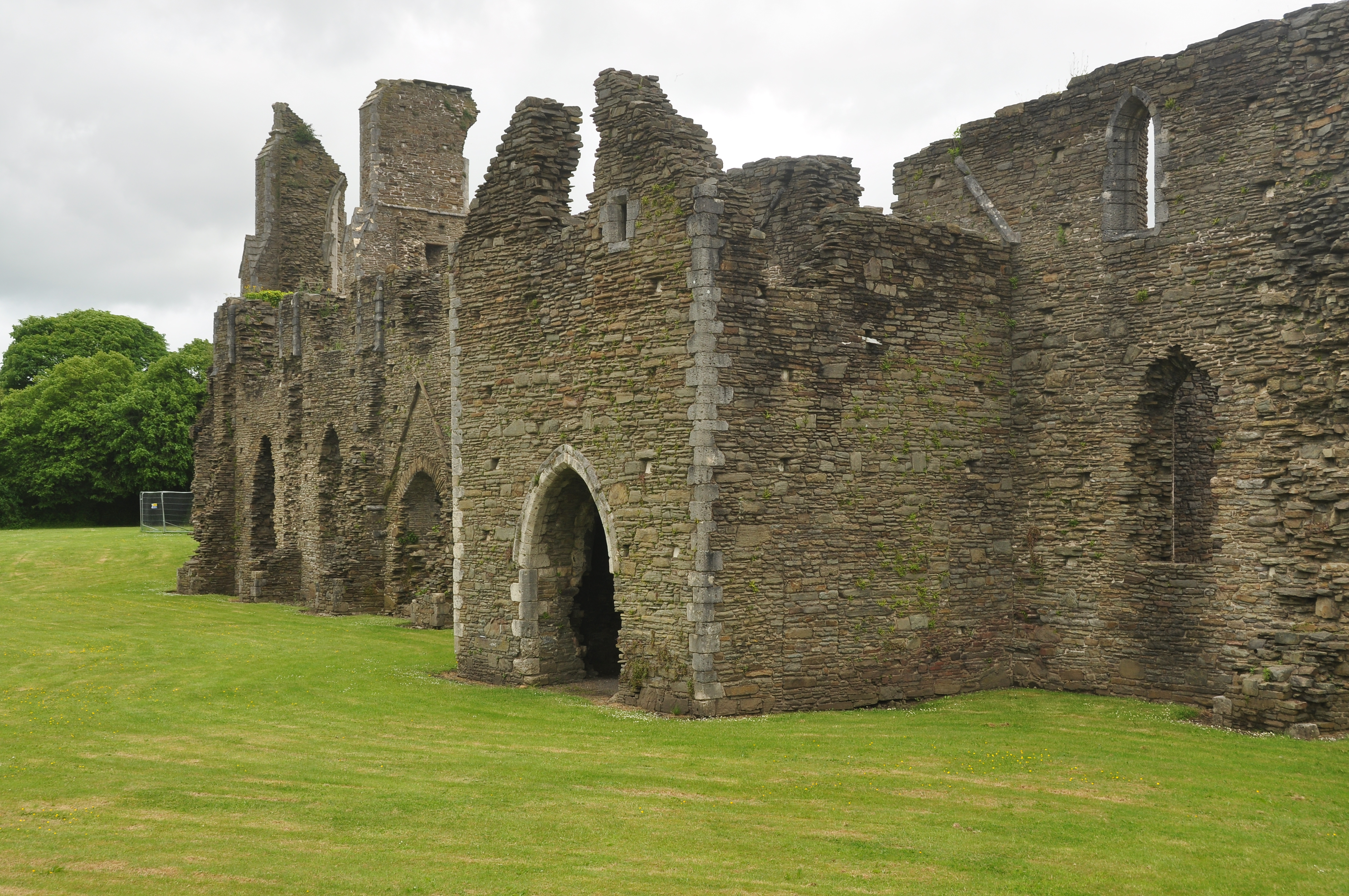
- From the top, View over Neath, The Parade, Neath Abbey

- Location within Neath Port Talbot
- Population: 50,658
- OS grid reference: SS745975
- Community: Neath
- Principal area: Neath Port Talbot
- Preserved county: West Glamorgan
- Country: Wales
- Sovereign state: United Kingdom
- Post town: NEATH
- Postcode district: SA10-11
- Dialling code: 01639
- Police: South Wales
- Fire: Mid and West Wales
- Ambulance: Welsh
- UK Parliament: Neath and Swansea East
- Senedd Cymru – Welsh Parliament: Brycheiniog Tawe Nedd
- List of places UK Wales Neath Port Talbot 51.66°N 3.81°W Map of the community

Neath (/niːθ/; Welsh: Castell-nedd) is a market town and community situated in the Neath Port Talbot County Borough, Wales. The town had a population of 50,658 in 2011. The community of the parish of Neath had a population of 19,258 in 2011. Historically in Glamorgan, the town is located on the River Neath, seven miles (eleven kilometres) east-northeast of Swansea.

== Etymology ==
The town's English name ultimately derives from "Nedd" the original Welsh name for the River Neath and is known to be Celtic or Pre-Celtic. A meaning of 'shining' or 'brilliant' has been suggested, as has a link to the older Indo-European root *-nedi (simply meaning 'river').

As such, the town may share its etymology with the town of Stratton, Cornwall and the River Nidd in Northern England.

== History ==
=== Roman fort ===
The town is located at a ford of the River Neath and its strategic situation is evident by a number of Celtic hill forts, surrounding the town. The Romans also recognised the area's strategic importance and built an Auxiliary Fort on the river's Western bank around 74 AD.

Much of the site is on the grounds of Dwr-y-Felin Comprehensive School but archaeological digs have also found gate-towers that extended out beyond the fort's walls (a feature unique in Roman Britain) and a large Roman marching camp that would have accommodated thousands of troops. These finds indicate some of the unusual measures the Romans took during the resistance of the native Silures. The fort at Neath was abandoned around 125 AD for fifteen years and again around 170 AD for a century before the final Roman withdrawal around 320 AD.

The Antonine Itinerary (c. 2nd century) names Nido (or Nidum) as one of nine places in Roman Wales.

=== Medieval period ===
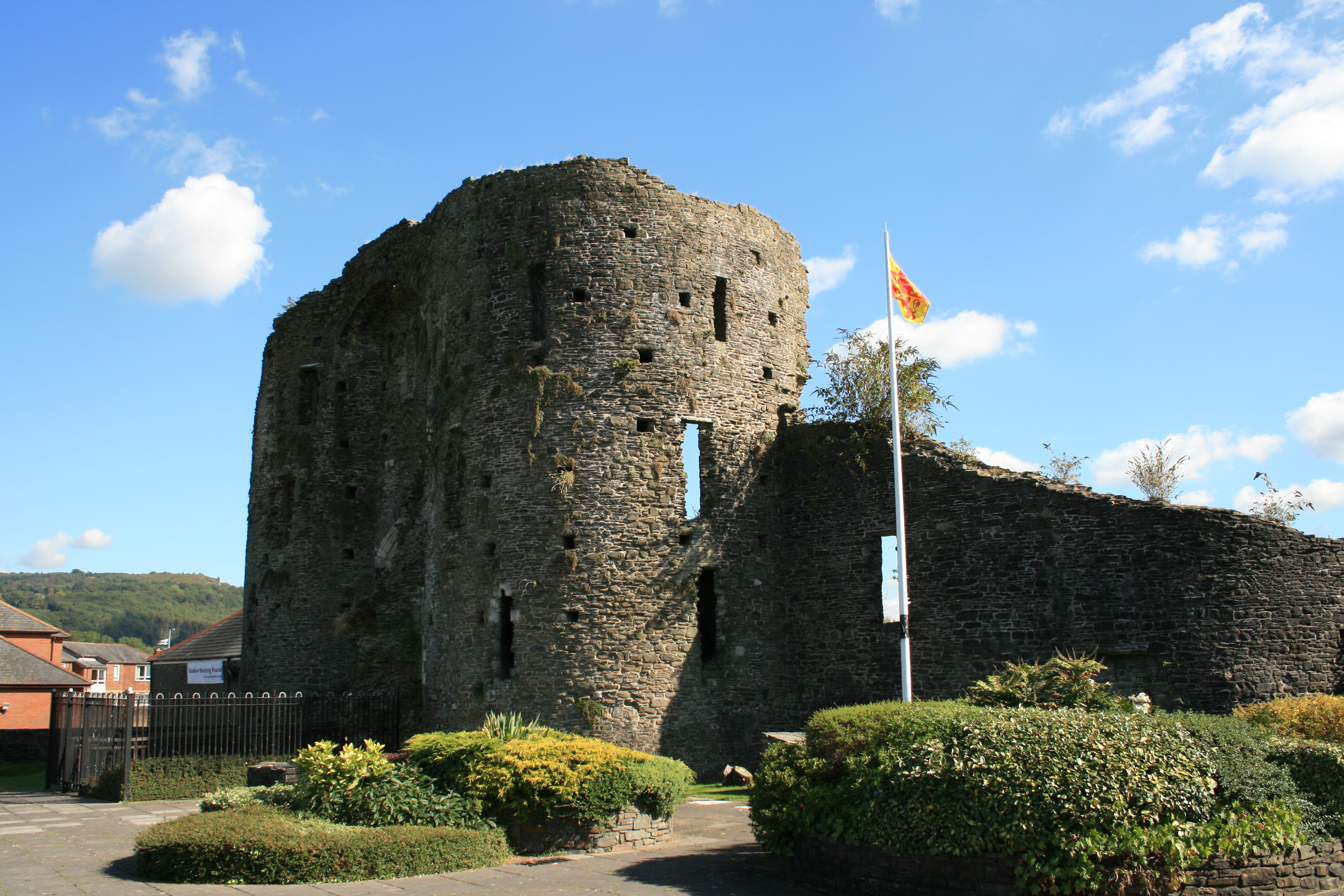
Neath Castle

St Illtyd visited the Neath area and established a settlement in what is now known as Llantwit on the northern edge of the town. The church of St Illtyd was built at this settlement and was enlarged in Norman times. The Norman and pre-Norman church structure remains intact and active to day within the Church in Wales. The Welsh language name for Neath is Castell-nedd, referring to the Norman Neath Castle, the English kings Henry II, John, and Edward I visited.

=== Industrial and modern Neath ===
Neath was a market town that expanded with the arrival of the Industrial Revolution in the 18th century with new manufacturing industries of iron, steel and tinplate. The Mackworth family, who owned the Gnoll Estate were prominent in the town's industrial development. Coal was mined extensively in the surrounding valleys and the construction of canals and railways made Neath a major transportation centre and the Evans and Bevan families were major players in the local coal mining community as well as owning the Vale of Neath Brewery. Silica was mined in the Craig-y-Dinas area of Pontneddfechan, after Quaker entrepreneur William Weston Young invented the blast furnace silica firebrick, later moving brick production from the works at Pontwalby to the Green in Neath. The town continued as a market trading centre with a municipal cattle market run by W.B. Trick. Industrial development continued throughout the 20th century with the construction by BP of a new petroleum refinery at Llandarcy.

Admiral Lord Nelson stayed at the Castle Hotel en route to Milford Haven when the fleet was at anchor there. Lt. Lewis Roatley, the son of the landlord of the Castle Hotel, served as a Royal Marines officer with Nelson aboard HMS Victory in the Battle of Trafalgar.

The River Neath is a navigable estuary and Neath was a river port until recent times. The heavy industries are no more; the town is now a commercial and tourism centre. Attractions for visitors are the ruins of the Cistercian Neath Abbey, the Gnoll Park, and Neath Indoor Market.

Neath hosted the National Eisteddfod of Wales in 1918, 1934 and 1994.

== Notable people ==
See Category:People from Neath

- Roger Blake (1957– ), actor, entertainer and impressionist;
- Mark Bowen (1963–, b. Briton Ferry), Former manager of Reading FC, and played for Spurs and Norwich City;
- Hugh Dalton (1887–1962, b. Gnoll), Labour politician, Chancellor of the Exchequer, 1945–1947;
- Ben Davies (1993– ), Tottenham Hotspur, and Wales footballer;
- David Davies, (1877–1944), Welsh international rugby union forward;
- David John Davies (1879–1935), Australian archdeacon;
- Ivor Emmanuel (1927–2007), singer and actor;
- Hugh Evan-Thomas (1862–1928), vice-admiral;
- Craig Evans (born 1971), cricketer;
- Rebecca Evans (1963–, b. Pontrhydyfen), soprano;
- Sir Samuel Thomas Evans (1859–1918, b. Skewen), politician and judge;
- George Grant Francis (1814–1882, b. Swansea) historian who wrote Original Charters and Materials for a History of Neath (1845);
- Julie Gardner (1969– ), television producer previously responsible for Doctor Who and its spin-off Torchwood, former executive producer of Scripted Projects at BBC Worldwide and co-founder of Bad Wolf Productions;
- Richard Grant (born 1984), cricketer;
- Cecil Griffiths (1900–1945), winner of an Olympic gold medal in the 4 × 400 m relay at the 1920 Antwerp Olympics;
- Howel Gwyn (1806–1888), Conservative politician;
- Thomas Haffield (1988– ), Great Britain Olympic swimmer;
- Carl Harris (1956– ), the former Leeds United and Wales international;
- Richard Hibbard (1983– ), rugby player for the Dragons of the Pro14;
- T. G. H. James (1923–2009), Egyptologist and former Keeper of Egyptian Antiquities at the British Museum;
- Sir William Jenkins (1871–1944), former Neath MP;
- Katherine Jenkins (1980– ), popular classical mezzo-soprano;
- Margaret Townsend Jenkins (1843–1923), Canadian clubwoman
- Della Jones (1946, b. Tonna), mezzo-soprano;
- Kristian Lavercombe (1976–), actor and singer
- Geraint F. Lewis (1969– ), leading astrophysicist;
- Andy Legg (1966– ), former professional footballer and Wales international;
- Tony Lewis (1938–, b. Swansea), first Welshman to Captain an England cricket tour abroad, (India, Pakistan, 1972–73). Led Glamorgan to 2nd County Championship, 1969. Writer and broadcaster.
- Michael Locke (1979–), skateboarder and stuntman known for the TV series Dirty Sanchez
- Andrew Matthews-Owen, pianist;
- Ray Milland (1907–1986), Oscar-winning Hollywood actor;
- Craig Mitchell (1986– ), Welsh international rugby union forward;
- David Watts Morgan (1867–1933), miners' leader and politician;
- Sir William Nott (1782–1845), British General in India;
- Harry Parr-Davies (1914–1955), composer;
- Jessie Penn-Lewis (1861–1927), missioner and revivalist;
- Gary Pickford-Hopkins (1948–2013) singer, composer and guitarist;
- Sir Arthur Pugh (1870–1955, b. Ross-on-Wye, Herefordshire), trade unionist, moved to his father's birthplace, Neath, 1894;
- Henry Habberley Price (1899–1984), philosopher;
- Walter Enoch Rees (1863–1949), rugby administrator;
- Andrew Rhodes (1977– ), civil servant, Registrar and Chief Operating Officer of Swansea University
- Paul Rhys (1963– ), actor;
- Craig Richards (1959– ), former professional footballer
- Connor Roberts (1995– ), Welsh international footballer;
- Will Roberts (1907–2000, b. Ruabon, Denbighshire), artist, moved to Neath 1918;
- Peter Shreeves (1940– ), former Spurs and Sheffield Wednesday manager;
- Samuel Charles Silkin, Baron Silkin of Dulwich (1918–1988), barrister and politician, Attorney-General, 1974–1979;
- Tony Skuse (1956–), darts player
- Jonathan Spratt (1986– ), Welsh rugby player
- William Squire (1917–1989), actor;
- David Thaxton (1982– ), West End performer
- Brian Thomas (1940–2012), Wales rugby union lock who also played and managed Neath RFC;
- Bonnie Tyler (1951–2026, b. Skewen), pop star;
- Andrew Vicari (1938–2016), artist;
- Ron Waldron (1933– ), Welsh rugby coach;
- Alfred Russel Wallace (1823, b. Monmouthshire), evolutionary theorist, lived in Neath during 1841/2 and attended lectures given by the area's scientific societies;
- Cyril Walters (1905–1992), Glamorgan cricketer and Captain of the England cricket team;
- Anna Letitia Waring (1823–1910), poet and hymn writer;
- Elijah Waring (1788–1857), writer; and
- Jane Williams [called Llinos] (1795–1873), singer and compiler of traditional Welsh music.

== Sport ==
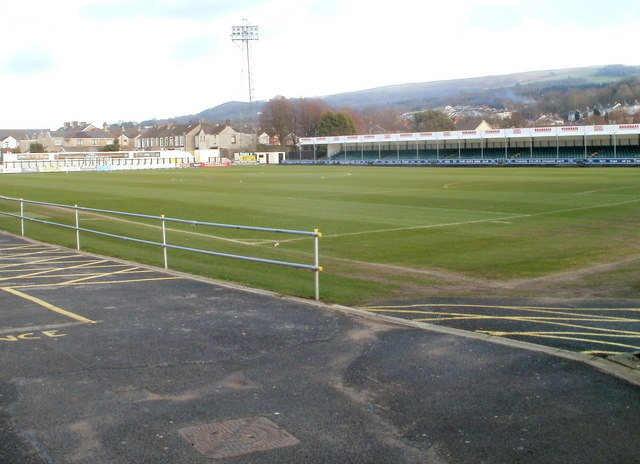
The Gnoll Sportsground. Home to Neath RFC

The Welsh Rugby Union was formed at a meeting held at the Castle Hotel in 1881. Neath Rugby Football Club, the famous and successful "Welsh All Blacks", play at The Gnoll.

Motorcycle speedway was staged at the Abbey Stadium in Neath in 1962. The Welsh Dragons, led by New Zealander Trevor Redmond, raced with some success in the Provincial League but, because of local problems, a number of the "home" fixtures were raced at St Austell. The Dragons introduced the Australian rider Charlie Monk to British speedway. After a season at Long Eaton Archers, Monk went on to have considerable success at Glasgow. The team also featured South African Howdy Cornell. In the early 1960s there was also stock car racing held at Neath Abbey, opposite the monastery

Neath Athletic A.F.C. was the town's largest football team, playing at Neath RFC's ground, The Gnoll, and played in the top flight of Welsh football, the Welsh Premier League, until the club was wound up in 2012. In the 2006–07 season, Neath Athletic A.F.C. were promoted from the Welsh Football League First Division to the Welsh Premier League. Neath Athletic A.F.C. had an average of 300 supporters attending a domestic, Welsh Premier League game, which was typical of the Welsh Premier League.

== Administration ==
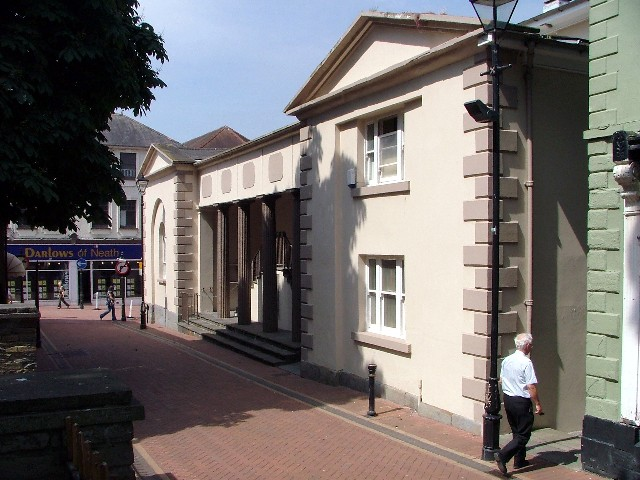
The old Neath Town Hall

After Neath became a municipal borough in 1835, the borough council was based at Neath Town Hall in Church Place before relocating to Gwyn Hall in Orchard Street in 1888. Neath District Council, which was formed in 1974, was absorbed into the larger unitary authority of Neath Port Talbot on 1 April 1996. The town encompasses the electoral wards of Neath East, Neath North, Neath South and Cimla.

For the House of Commons at Westminster, Neath is part of the Neath and Swansea East constituency. As of 2024, its Member of Parliament (MP) is Carolyn Harris of the Labour Party.

In the Senedd, the Neath Senedd constituency is represented by Jeremy Miles (Labour), and by the wider South Wales West electoral region which returns four additional Members of the Senedd (MSs).

== Climate ==
As with the rest of the British Isles, Neath experiences a maritime climate with cool summers and mild winters, often high winds, and low sunshine levels.

Climate data for Neath 62m asl, 1961–1990
Month	Jan	Feb	Mar	Apr	May	Jun	Jul	Aug	Sep	Oct	Nov	Dec	Year
Mean daily maximum °C (°F)	7.6 (45.7)	7.5 (45.5)	9.5 (49.1)	12.2 (54.0)	15.4 (59.7)	17 (63)	19 (66)	18 (64)	16 (61)	13 (55)	9 (48)	8 (46)	13.4 (56.1)
Mean daily minimum °C (°F)	2.7 (36.9)	2.4 (36.3)	3.5 (38.3)	5.1 (41.2)	8.1 (46.6)	10.9 (51.6)	12.7 (54.9)	12.6 (54.7)	10.9 (51.6)	8.7 (47.7)	5.1 (41.2)	3.6 (38.5)	7.2 (45.0)
Average precipitation mm (inches)	137 (5.4)	90 (3.5)	100 (3.9)	70 (2.8)	79 (3.1)	79 (3.1)	78 (3.1)	107 (4.2)	114 (4.5)	130 (5.1)	140 (5.5)	143 (5.6)	1,267 (49.9)
Mean monthly sunshine hours	49.6	67.8	108.5	159.0	186.0	183.0	186.0	173.6	132.0	93.0	69.0	46.5	1,460
Source: Met Office

== Education ==
Dwr-y-Felin Comprehensive School is situated on the outskirts of the town, opposite a campus of NPTC Group (which was previously Neath Port Talbot College. Dwr-y-felin previously consisted of the upper School and lower school, the upper was housed on Dwr-y-Felin Road in the buildings of the former Neath Grammar School adjacent to Neath Port Talbot College, while the Lower School was situated on the campus of the former Rhydhir Secondary Modern school in Longford, Neath Abbey. Since a site amalgamation which took place on 6 September 2012, all school facilities are located at the former Upper School, with an extra building having been constructed at a cost of 9.7 million pounds. Cefn Saeson Comprehensive School is in the village of Cimla, The school is located on Afan Valley Road. A new school was built in 2021 on the football field of the existing school dating from the early 1970s and now demolished. Two other comprehensive schools serve the town: Llangatwg Comprehensive School in Cadoxton and Ysgol Bae Baglan in Baglan.

== Transport ==
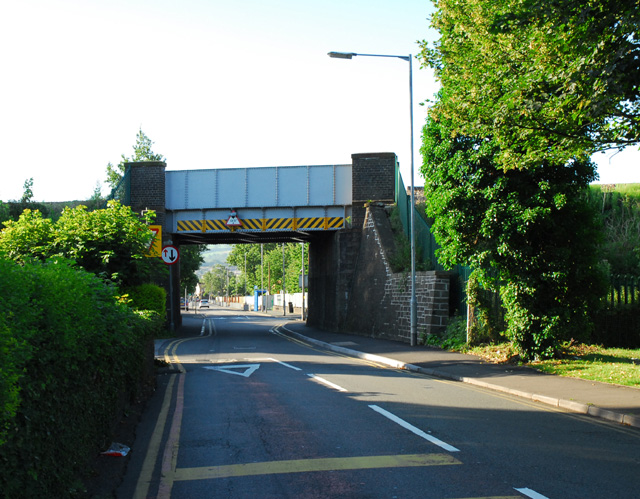
Railway Bridge over Dwr-y-Felin Road next to Dwr-y-Felin Comprehensive School.

Neath railway station is on the South Wales Main Line. Great Western Railway and Transport for Wales serve the station with services westbound to Swansea, Carmarthen and the West Wales Line and eastbound to Port Talbot Parkway, Bridgend, Cardiff Central and London Paddington. Trains also run via Hereford and Shrewsbury to Crewe and Manchester Piccadilly.

Neath bus station is at Victoria Gardens, a five-minute walk from the railway station. National Express services call at the railway station. From Victoria Gardens, First Cymru provides direct inter-urban services to nearby Swansea and Port Talbot in addition to South Wales Transport who provide many similar local services.

The A465 skirts the town to the north east and provides a link to the M4.

== Plans ==
In 2008 plans were announced to regenerate around 1,000 acres (400 hectares) of land in and around Neath town centre. The site once occupied by the previous civic centre was to be redeveloped as a new shopping centre. The area around the Milland Road Industrial Estate and with the area around the Neath Canal were also to be redeveloped. The proposals included an "iconic" golden rugby ball-shaped museum, a library, heritage centre and other new facilities.

In March 2008, the county's new radio station, Afan FM, announced plans to install a new transmitter for the Neath area. This would give residents of Neath access to the radio station, which already transmitted to the neighbouring area of Port Talbot. The new transmitter for the Neath area was commissioned by Government regulator Ofcom on Thursday 23 October 2008.

== Galleries ==
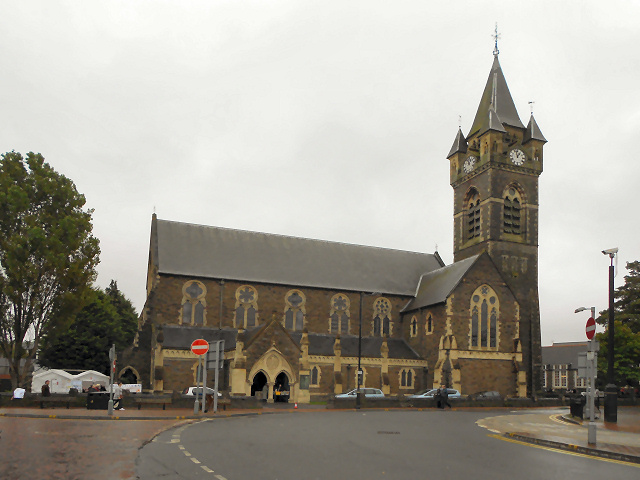
St. David's Church in Neath

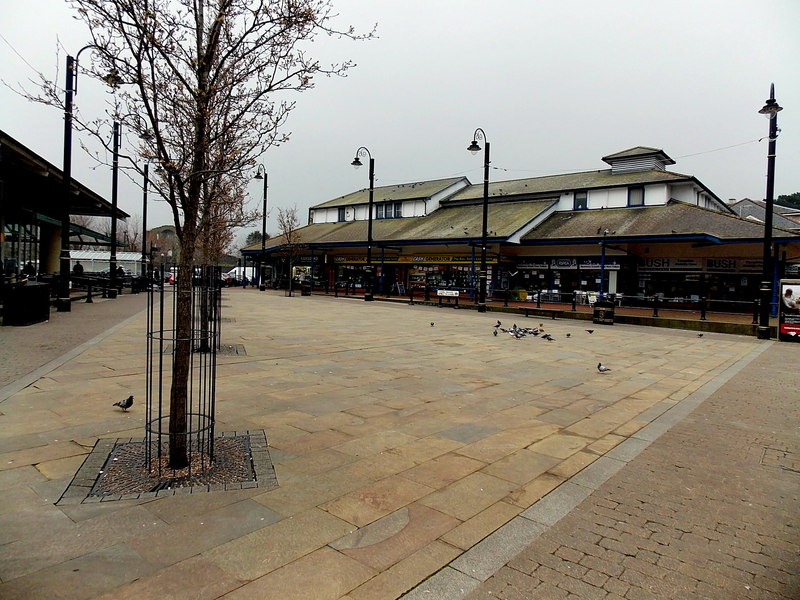
Triangular square in the town centre

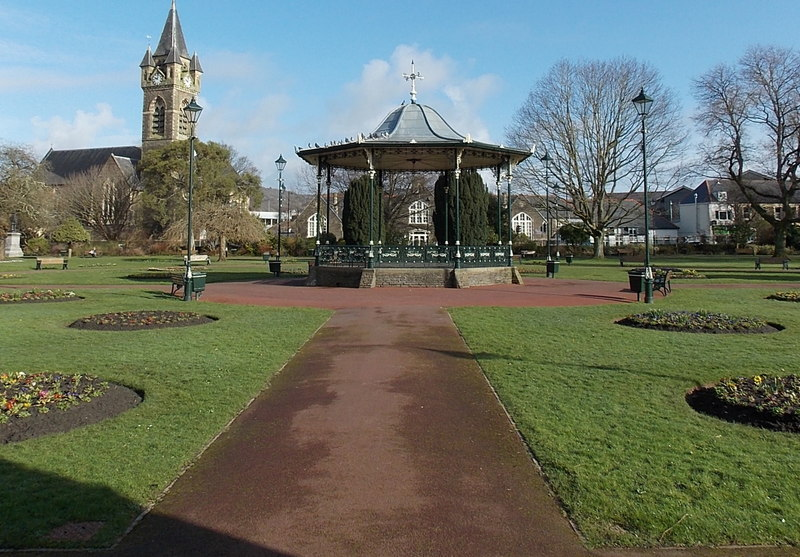
Victoria Gardens within the town

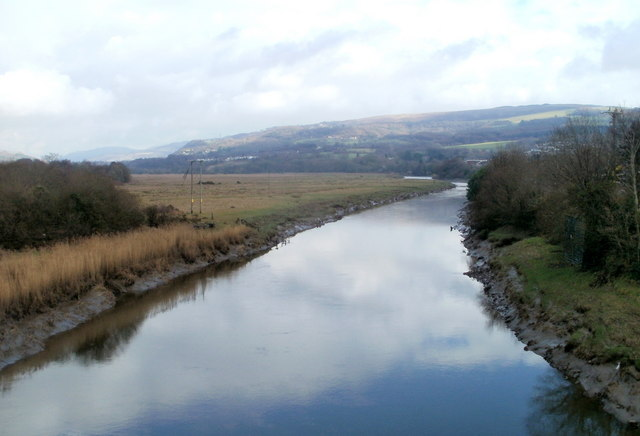
River Neath
