= Brian Thomas (rugby union) =

Wales rugby union player and coach (1940–2012)

- Born: Brian Thomas; 18 May 1940 Neath, Wales
- Died: 9 July 2012 (aged 72)
- School: Neath Boys Grammar School
- University: Christ's College, Cambridge

Rugby union career
- Position: lock
Amateur team(s)
Years	Team	Apps	(Points)
- Cambridge University
–	Neath RFC		
International career
Years	Team	Apps	(Points)
1963–1969	Wales	21	(3)
Coaching career
- Years: Team
- 1981–1996: Neath RFC

Brian Thomas (18 May 1940 – 9 July 2012) was a Welsh rugby union lock, most notable for his time playing for and later managing Neath RFC. He was capped for Wales 21 times between 1964 and 1969 and was part of three Five Nations–winning teams.

== Rugby career ==
Thomas played rugby as a schoolboy, and was selected to represent his country for the Welsh Secondary Schools side. On leaving Neath Grammar School, he matriculated at Cambridge University, studying the natural sciences tripos as an undergraduate at Christ's College, Cambridge. He was selected for the University team, and won three sporting 'Blues' playing in the Varsity Match in 1960, 1961 and 1962. During his time back in Wales, away from college, he represented his local team Neath and faced the touring South African team of 1961 as part of a joint Aberavon / Neath side. On leaving Cambridge he returned to Neath, where he became an integral member of the club team. At the age of 22, he was selected for his first full international cap when he was chosen to represent Wales against England as part of the 1963 Five Nations Championship.

Thomas went on to represent Wales 21 times between 1963 and 1969, each of his caps won as a Neath player, his only senior club. He toured twice with Wales, in 1964 to South Africa, playing in all four games, and in 1969 to Australasia and Fiji. While at Neath he captained them for two seasons between 1966 and 1968.

In 1981 Thomas became the team manager of Neath, and during that time he led them to five club titles, as Welsh Club Champions in 1986/87, 1988/89 and 1989/90, then as the winners of Welsh Premier Division in 1990/91 and 1995/96. In his 1989 book The Rugby Clubs of Wales, David Parry-Jones describes Thomas as bringing a "fresh dimension to the tradition of tough, closely concentrated forward play" who was able to "attract and mould distant talent which might otherwise have found its way into other clubs".

Thomas was father-in-law to Wales international Rowland Phillips and Neath flanker Robin Jones. He was the grandfather of Swansea second-row Jack Jones.
