= Clive Leyman =

Welsh aerodynamicist (born 1935)

Clive Leyman (born October 24 1935) is a Welsh aerodynamicist and was the chief aerodynamicist of Concorde.

== Early life ==
He was the son of William Henry Leyman (February 23 1907 - February 1988), of 36 Mary Street and Prudence (1907-1986). His father became General Manager of Red Dragon Relays. His mother died on January 21 1986. His father Billy Leyman died on Sunday February 14 1988 at Neath General Hospital.

He went to Neath Grammar School for Boys in Wales. He studied at Queen Mary College in London.

== Career ==
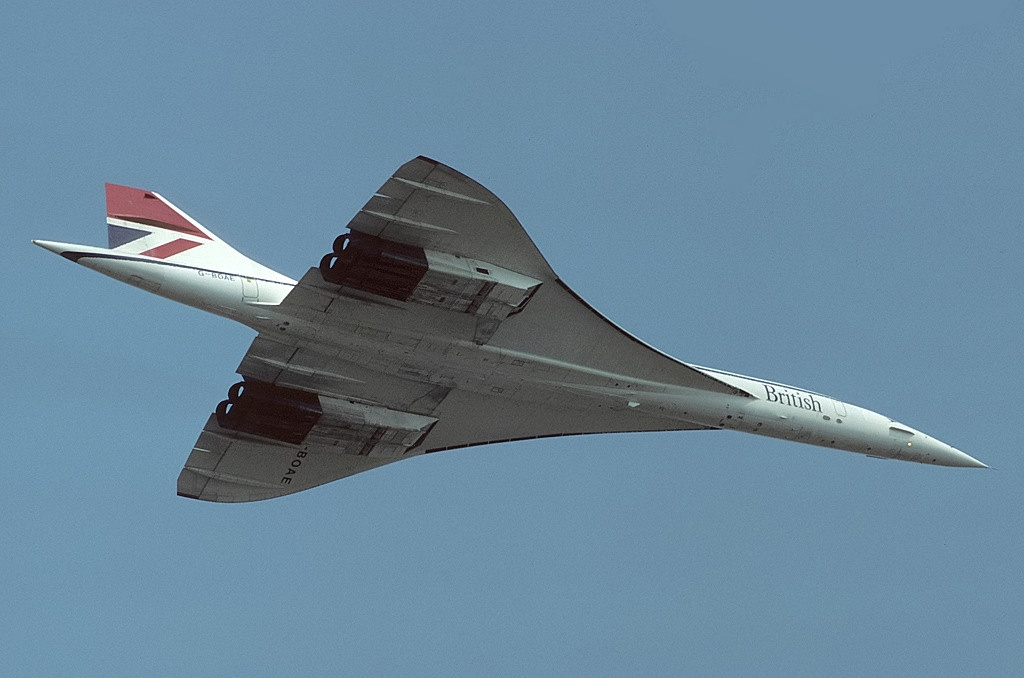
Concorde 102 at RAF Fairford in July 1984

=== BAC ===
He joined the Bristol Aeroplane Company in 1957, which became BAC in 1960. He became the Chief Aerodynamicist at BAC.

He worked with Jean Rech of Aérospatiale. Aerodynamic research for Concorde was notably carried out with the BAC 221, which had a droop nose, and the Dassault Mirage IV. Concorde had an ogee-shaped wing. The Concorde delta began at 57 degrees. Wave drag, lift-induced drag (vortex drag) and trim drag were important.

=== British Aerospace ===
With British Aerospace, he became the Chief Engineer of the HOTOL project.

He later became a part-time Professor in Mechanical Engineering and Aeronautics at City, University of London.

== Personal life ==
In 1955, he was the assistant scout master of the 5th Neath scout group. He married Mair Davies on Saturday 31 August 1957 at St David's Church in Neath.

He later married Daphne Phipps in 1985. He lives in Pucklechurch, a village on the B4465 in South Gloucestershire, close to the M4.

== Publications ==
- Concorde aerodynamics and associated systems development, American Institute of Aeronautics and Astronautics, 1980 (with Jean Rech) ISBN 1563473089
- A Review of the Technical Development of Concorde, Progress in Aerospace Sciences Volume 23 1986

== See also ==
- Ray Creasey, chief aerodynamicist of the English Electric Lightning
- Don Dykins, chief aerodynamicist for British Aerospace Civil Division
- Aerospace industry in the United Kingdom
