= Gordon Back =

Welsh pianist

Gordon Back (born c.1950) is a Welsh pianist, teacher and music administrator, best known for his association with the violinist Yehudi Menuhin and the Menuhin Competition, of which he has been Artistic Director since 2002.

Back was born in Wales and educated at Neath Boys' Grammar School, and played with the Glamorgan Youth Orchestra. He studied at the Royal Northern College of Music in Manchester, and obtained a Lady Grace James Scholarship, as a result of which he studied in Italy under Guido Agosti and Sergio Lorenzi. In 1978, he made his name internationally by playing at the Alice Tully Hall in New York City alongside Dong-Suk Kang, and has since been an official accompanist at the Tchaikovsky Competition and the Carl Flesch Violin Competition, among others. Having accompanied artists such as Yo Yo Ma, Emma Johnson and Sarah Chang, he was appointed head of the Department of Accompaniment at London's Guildhall School of Music in 1980, and became a fellow in 1984.

Gordon Back met Menuhin in the 1970s when he accompanied some of the violinist's master classes, and was official accompanist at the first Menuhin Competition in 1983. Following Menuhin's death in 1999, he began taking the competition further afield, to Norway, China and the United States among other locations. He describes it as "as much a festival as a competition". In 2016 he appeared in a BBC television documentary, "Who's Yehudi?", to mark the centenary of Menuhin's birth. In response to observations about the predominance of Asian competitors in recent competitions, Back says, "Musicians who studied in America with some of the world's best professors go back to Asia to teach because the fees are good and they're respected."

In 2013, following the death of Gareth Walters, Back became artistic director of the Gower Festival.
