= Keith Peters (physician) =

Welsh physician

Professor Sir Keith Peters GBE FRS FMedSci FRCP FRCPE FRCPath FLSW
- Born: David Keith Peters; 26 July 1938 (age 88); Baglan, Glamorgan, Wales, UK
- Education: Glan Afan Grammar School
- Alma mater: Welsh National School of Medicine
- Awards: Knight Bachelor, GBE
- Scientific career
- Workplaces: University of Birmingham; National Institute for Medical Research; Welsh National School of Medicine; Royal Postgraduate Medical School

Sir David Keith Peters (born 26 July 1938) is a retired Welsh physician and academic. He was Regius Professor of Physic at the University of Cambridge from 1987 to 2005, where he was also head of the School of Clinical Medicine.

== Education ==
Educated at Glan Afan Grammar School Port Talbot, Peters graduated in Medicine from the Welsh National School of Medicine in 1961.

== Career and research ==
Peters' research interests focused on the role of the immune system in kidney and vascular diseases. His key achievements included increasing understanding of how a kidney disease called glomerulonephritis develops.

After posts at the University of Birmingham, the National Institute for Medical Research at Mill Hill and the Welsh National School of Medicine, he was appointed Lecturer in Medicine and Consultant Physician at the Royal Postgraduate Medical School (RPMS), Hammersmith Hospital in 1969.

Between 1969 and 1975 Peters was successively Lecturer in Medicine, Lecturer in Medicine and Immunology, and Reader in Medicine, before being appointed Professor of Medicine and Director of the Department of Medicine at the Royal Postgraduate Medical School (RPMS) in 1977. Peters' research centred on the immunology of renal and vascular disease, and in particular on how delineation of immunological mechanisms could lead to new therapies for these disorders. In 1987 Peters moved to Cambridge where he was Head of the University's School of Medicine until 2005, and transformed its standing. Peters' major contributions to British medicine have been through the promotion of clinical research: at the RPMS he was responsible for sustaining the outstanding reputation of the Department of Medicine; and in Cambridge under his leadership the University's Clinical School became a major centre for medical research, complementing Cambridge's strengths in basic biomedical science. In 1990 he introduced the Cambridge MB-PhD programme which provides an integrated research and clinical medicine training for gifted medical students, the first of its kind in the UK. He was a driving force for the partnership between the University, the Medical Research Council and Addenbrookes Hospital, for what has become the Cambridge Biomedical Campus. Many of the leading medical academics in the UK worked with Peters at Hammersmith and/or Cambridge.

From 2006 to 2008 Peters was Interim Director of the MRC National Institute of Medical Research and there conceived and initiated the development of what is now the Francis Crick Institute. From 2012 to 2016 he served on the executive committee of the Francis Crick Institute in London. Peters has also made national contributions to UK science through his memberships of the Prime Minister's Advisory Council of Science and Technology (ACOST) and its successor, the Council of Science and Technology (CST). He was Chair of Council of Cardiff University from 2004 to 2011. From 2005 to 2016 he was a Senior Consultant in Research and Development for GlaxoSmithKline.

=== Awards and honours ===
Peters was knighted in the 1993 New Year's Honours List, was elected a Fellow of the Royal Society (FRS) in 1995 and was the President of the Academy of Medical Sciences from 2002 to 2006. He was a Founding Fellow of the Learned Society of Wales. Peters is an Honorary Fellow of Christ's College, Cambridge and Clare Hall, Cambridge, and has received Honorary Doctorates and Fellowships from the University of Wales College of Medicine and the following universities: Wales, Swansea, Aberdeen, Nottingham, Paris, Birmingham, Leicester, Glasgow, Edinburgh, St Andrews, Sussex, Bristol, Keele, Warwick, UCL, Kings College, Imperial College and Cardiff. At the Royal College of Physicians he delivered the Goulstonian Lecture in 1976, the Bradshaw Lecture in 1985, and the Harveian Oration in 2004. On 15 June 2016 he was awarded the degree of Doctor of Medical Science (honoris causa) by the University of Cambridge. He is a Foreign Member of the American Philosophical Society and a Foreign Member of the US National Academy of Medicine.In 2018 he was made an Honorary Freeman of the Worshipful Society of Apothecaries. In 2019 the research building housing the Cambridge Institute for Medical Research and the MRC Mitochondrial Biology Unit (the former MRC-Wellcome Trust Building) was renamed the Keith Peters Building.The Board Room at the Francis Crick Institute and a ward in the Renal Unit at Hammersmith Hospital are also named after him.

Peters was appointed Knight Grand Cross of the Order of the British Empire (GBE) in the 2018 New Year Honours for services to the advancement of medical science.

== See also ==
- List of Welsh medical pioneers

Educational offices
Preceded by Sir Peter Lachmann	President of the Academy of Medical Sciences, United Kingdom; 2002–2006	Succeeded by Sir John Irving Bell
