= Chris Bromham =

British actor

Chris Bromham (born 20 July 1957 in Skewen), is a Welsh motorcycle stunt performer. Bromham is the current World Record holder of the motorcycle jump obstacle record, having jumped over 18 double-decker buses (beating the previous record of 14), and in the same jump a new distance record of 208 feet, on 29 August 1983 riding a KTM 500 Motocross at Norman Park, Bromley, England.

== Biography ==
The youngest of seven born in the coal mining village of Skewen, Bromham was educated at Coedffranc Primary School, and then Dwr-y-Felin Comprehensive School. Having found his talent with motorcycles, he took a series of jobs while honing his skills, including delivery work at the Co-op and surface work with the National Coal Board.

=== Career ===
Bromham began to practice motorcycle stunt jumping after watching Evel Knievel perform at London's Wembley Stadium in 1976. He found a talent for riding and jumping motorcycles and trained himself part-time to become a stunt performer. His first public performance was in 1977, performing at the Clevelly Art Festival in Devon, which led to a dual career as both stuntman and show performer. His first major film appearance was in the 1981 British film Riding High starring motorcycle stunt performer Eddie Kidd as Dave Munday, where Bromham was a stunt double for two of the film's characters.

In 1981, Bromham jumped 28 cars in a world record attempt at Swansea Airport. After returning from a New Zealand tour in 1982, he established two world records on 29 August 1983 at Bromley, Kent, one with a distance of 208 feet (63 m) and the other an obstacle record of clearing 18 double-decker buses at a distance of 196.3 feet (59.8 m).

In 1984 Bromham worked alongside actor Rex Smith as one of the motorcycle jump sequence stuntmen on the American TV series Street Hawk, and later purchased one of the original modified Street Hawk motorcycles used in the television series, after which he attempted another world record. Following its failure, he practised further and on 31 August 1986 at the Royal Victoria Dock, London established a world record by jumping 20 lorries and another world record for 241 feet (73 m) distance.

After completing another New Zealand tour, Bromham jumped 14 single-deck buses back in Britain in 1988 to beat Knievel's previous record. For that stunt, he was costumed as Cy-Clone, a costumed robot Bromham created with television producer Mike Young.

=== Personal life ===
Following his 1981 tour, Bromham met his first wife Donna, a New Zealander, whom he married on 8 August 1983. The couple have two daughters, Natalie (born 1988) and Natasha (born 1991), who joined Chris's son Shane. On 19 July 1992 Donna, his wife, was struck down and killed by an unsecured road Safety vehicle whilst walking along a pavement on her way back from a local shop with her two young daughters by her side, the youngest still in her pram. Bromham married his current wife Anna-Marie on 7 August 1997; the family live in Swansea.

Bromham is a model maker. he has produced a full-size replica of H G Wells' The Time Machine and built a scale model of Campbells' Bluebird K7.
