= Oliver Sims =

British computer scientist

Oliver Sims (born 1943, died in 2015) was a British computer scientist, former IBM employee, and enterprise architecture consultant, known for his work on business objects Object-oriented programming, and service-oriented architecture (SOA).

== Biography ==
After attending George Watson's College and Neath Grammar School, Sims studied Economics and Statistics at Swansea University, where he received his BSc (Econ) with honours in 1969.

In 1969 Sims started his 24-year career at IBM, where he started as a trainee Systems Engineer. He held positions in software development, technical management and, in his last three years, in consultancy. He worked on a range of software products from operating systems, middleware, database management systems (DBMS) and application packages to the development of in-house customer applications. in 1993 he became Chief Architect and Principal Consultant for Integrated Objects Ltd in Newbury, UK, and also became member of the Object Management Group. He has held a number of other positions in software and consultancy ever since.

He described his goal as "to contribute to the transformation of software development, and IT's management of their assets, to much higher levels of productivity, responsiveness, and flexibility. Achieving this goal is now possible through a synergistic combination of architectural design, traceability concepts, product line, middleware improvement, MDA, and agile processes."

== Selected publications ==
Books

- Sims, Oliver. Business objects]. McGraw-Hill, 1994.
- Eeles, Peter; Oliver Sims (1998). Building Business Objects. John Wiley & Sons. ISBN 0-471-19176-0.
- Herzum, Peter, and Oliver Sims. Business Components Factory: A Comprehensive Overview of Component-Based Development for the Enterprise. John Wiley & Sons, Inc., 2000.
- Sims, Oliver, Ashish Jain, and Mark Little. Enterprise service oriented architectures: concepts, challenges, recommendations. Springer, 2006.

Articles, a selection:

- Herzum, Peter, and Oliver Sims. "The business component approach." Business Object Design and Implementation II. Springer London, 1998. 46–58.
- Tyndale-Biscoe, Sandy, et al. "Business modelling for component systems with UML." Enterprise Distributed Object Computing Conference, 2002. EDOC'02. Proceedings. Sixth International. IEEE, 2002.

== See also ==
- Newi
- Object-oriented programming
