= Melveena McKendrick =

Welsh academic

Melveena Christine McKendrick, FBA (born 23 March 1941) is a retired Welsh academic. She was Professor of Spanish Golden Age Literature, Culture and Society at the University of Cambridge from 1999 to 2008, and served as its Pro-Vice-Chancellor for Education from January 2004 to October 2008. She has also been a Fellow of Girton College, Cambridge since 1967; she is currently a life fellow having retired from full-time academia in 2008.

== Early life ==
She attended Neath Grammar School for Girls and Dyffryn Grammar School, Port Talbot, before reading for a BA in Spanish at King's College London and a PhD at Girton College, Cambridge, which she received in 1967.

== Personal life ==
In 1967, the then Melveena Jones married Neil McKendrick, later Master of Gonville and Caius College, Cambridge. Together they have two daughters.

== Honours ==
In 1999, McKendrick was elected a Fellow of the British Academy (FBA), the United Kingdom's national academy for the humanities and social sciences. In 2013, she was awarded an honorary Doctor of Literature (DLitt) degree by the University of South Wales "in recognition of her outstanding contribution to literature and the arts".

== Selected works ==
- McKendrick, Melveena (1974). Woman and Society in the Spanish Drama of the Golden Age: A Study of the Mujer Varonil. London: Cambridge University Press. ISBN 978-0521202947.
- McKendrick, Melveena (1980). Cervantes. Boston: Little, Brown. ISBN 978-0316560542.
- McKendrick, Melveena (1989). Theatre in Spain 1490-1700. Cambridge: Cambridge University Press. ISBN 978-0521355926.
- McKendrick, Melveena (1996). The Revealing Image: stage portraits in the theatre of the Golden Age. London: Department of Hispanic Studies, Queen Mary and Westfield College. ISBN 978-0904188219.
- McKendrick, Melveena (2000). Playing the King: Lope de Vega and the Limits of Conformity. Woodbridge: Tamesis. ISBN 978-1855660694.
- McKendrick, Melveena (2002). Identities in Crisis: Essays on Honour, Gender and Women in the Comedia. Kassel: Edition Reichenberger. ISBN 978-3935004527.
