= Coleg Powys =

Coordinates: 51.953°N 3.382°W

Coleg Powys was a further education establishment in the County of Powys, Mid Wales. It had main campuses at Brecon, Llandrindod Wells and Newtown and a major outreach centre at Ystradgynlais. It also worked closely with partners in the County Council and other organisations to deliver services in multiple locations throughout the community, as well as providing facilities and teaching for students studying towards degrees accredited by the University of Wales institutions in both Lampeter and Newport.

In 2013, it merged with Neath Port Talbot College to form NPTC Group.

In 2005/06, the college supported over 9,000 individual learners in obtaining qualifications in a wide range of vocational and academic subjects. Many of these learners benefited from the additional learning support and study skills development programme that enabled them to complete their main qualifications successfully and to progress to higher education or employment.

The college held the Quality Mark for Learning Support awarded by the Basic Skills Agency and led a consortium of education and training providers in Powys that focuses on improving basic skills across the community.

Subject areas for full-time study included:

- Childcare, Health & Social Care
- Agriculture & Land Based Studies
- Technology & Engineering
- Motor Vehicle
- Construction
- Information Technology & Computing
- Beauty, Hairdressing and Therapies
- Sport, Leisure & Tourism
- Art & Design
- Performing Arts
- Business & Management

== Merger ==
Coleg Powys merged with Neath Port Talbot College in August 2013. The newly merged entity comprises twelve campuses serving 18,000 students covering about a third of Wales.
