= William Wade (legal scholar) =

British academic lawyer

Sir William Wade QC FBA
- Born: Henry William Rawson Wade; 16 January 1918
- Died: 12 March 2004 (aged 86)
- Other names: HWR Wade
- Education: Gonville and Caius College, Cambridge
- Spouses: Marie Osland-Hill (m. 1943; died 1980) Marjorie Hope-Gill (m. 1982; died 2001)
- Children: 2 sons
- Scientific career
- Fields: Constitutional law, United Kingdom administrative law

Sir Henry William Rawson Wade QC FBA (16 January 1918 – 12 March 2004) was a British academic lawyer, best known for his work on the law of real property and administrative law.

Wade was educated at Shrewsbury School and at Gonville and Caius College, Cambridge. After a fellowship at Harvard University, he began his career as a civil servant in the Treasury, before being elected to a fellowship at Trinity College, Cambridge in 1946. From 1961 to 1976, he was Professor of English Law at the University of Oxford and a fellow of St John's College, Oxford, and from 1978 to 1982 Rouse Ball Professor of English Law at the University of Cambridge; from 1976 to 1988, he was Master of Gonville and Caius College, Cambridge. He held the degrees of MA and LLD, and the honorary degree of LittD from the University of Cambridge.

In 1985, he gave evidence for the defence at the trial of Clive Ponting for an alleged breach of the Official Secrets Act for revealing details of the conduct of the Falklands War, at which Ponting was acquitted.

He believed and first proposed that Acts made under the "Parliament Acts 1911 and 1949 are delegated, not primary, legislation".

Wade was an oarsman, mountaineer and a keen gardener in latter years.

Academic offices
Preceded by Joseph Needham	Master of Gonville and Caius College; 1976–1988	Succeeded by Peter Gray
