= Peter Gray (chemist) =

Welsh chemist and academic

- Born: 25 August 1926; Newport
- Died: 7 June 2012 (aged 85)
- Education: Gonville and Caius College, Cambridge; University of Cambridge
- Spouse(s): Barbara Gray (died 1992), Rachel Gray
- Awards: Italgas Prize (1988); Bernard Lewis Gold Medal (1978); Marlow Medal (1958); Meldola Medal (1956); FRS
- Scientific career
- Fields: Chemistry
- Workplaces: University of Cambridge; University of Leeds

Peter Gray FRS (25 August 1926 – 7 June 2012) was Professor of Physical Chemistry at the University of Leeds and subsequently Master of Gonville and Caius College, Cambridge.

== Early life and education ==
Gray attended Newport High School. Gray was educated at the University of Cambridge where he was awarded a Bachelor of Arts in Natural Sciences in 1946 and a PhD in Chemistry three years later.

== Career ==
In 1955 Gray was appointed a lecturer in Chemistry at the University of Leeds. He was promoted to Reader in 1959 and to a personal chair as Professor of Physical Chemistry in 1962. He became Head of the Department of Physical Chemistry on the resignation of Professor Lord Dainton in 1965. His research interests included combustion flame and explosion oscillatory reactions and chaos in chemistry.

Gray left Leeds when he was elected Master of his old college Gonville and Caius College, Cambridge in 1988. He remained Master until 1996 and was then a Life Fellow of the college until his death in 2012.

== Awards and honours ==
Professor Gray's career was garlanded with many academic honours, including election as a Fellow of the Royal Society (FRS) in 1977. Gray was awarded an Honorary DSc by the University of Leeds in 1997. His nomination reads:

Gray's work is notable for its range and diversity. He was the first to measure temperature-position profiles in gaseous systems on the verge of ignition by a very fine thermocouple technique. The results show that N_{2}H_{4} oxidation is a pure thermal branched-chain explosion and that multiple cool flames in hydrocarbon oxidations are thermokinetic. His theoretical work on these and related systems is well recognised as original and comprehensive. The need to acquire ancillary data for his flame studies led Gray to measure the four principal transport properties of gases and his laboratory is now the foremost in this field in the UK. Inter alia this work has contributed to knowledge of intermolecular potential functions of dissimilar pairs. His work on reactivity and thermo chemistry of alkoxy, aryloxy, alkyl and perfluoro alkyl radicals is classical in importance ad quality and he has also made substantial advances in the chemistry of N_{2}O_{4} and dissociating vapours, azide thermo-chemistry and lattice energies.

== Personal life ==
With his first wife, Barbara (who was a lecturer in Biochemistry at the University of Leeds), Gray had four children; Christine, Andrew, David and Sally. Following her death in 1992 Gray married his second wife, Rachel, who survived him. His interests included music, hill walking and classical Russian science and maths.

Academic offices
Preceded by Sir William Wade	Master of Gonville and Caius College, Cambridge; 1988–1996	Succeeded by Neil McKendrick
Preceded by Lord Dainton	Head of the Department of Physical Chemistry, University of Leeds; 1965–1988	Unknown
