= Gareth Jones (conductor) =

Welsh orchestral and choral conductor

Gareth Jones (born 1960) is a Welsh orchestral and choral conductor.

He was born in South Wales and attended Glan Afan Comprehensive School, where he excelled at the piano. In 1990, he joined the Music Staff at Welsh National Opera, for which he has conducted a number of operas, making his WNO debut in 2004.

In the United Kingdom he has appeared with the Scottish Chamber Orchestra, the Orchestra of Welsh National Opera, Royal Scottish National Orchestra, BBC National Orchestra of Wales, the Royal Liverpool Philharmonic Orchestra, Royal Philharmonic Orchestra and the English Chamber Orchestra.

In 1996, Jones formed Sinfonia Cymru, and remains its principal conductor.

Jones also teaches prospective conductors and his teaching includes that of operatic conducting at the Royal Welsh College of Music and Drama.
