= Neil McKendrick =

British historian (born 1935)

- Born: 28 July 1935 (age 90)
- Spouse: Melveena McKendrick
- Scientific career
- Fields: History
- Institutions: University of Cambridge
- Notable students: Quentin Skinner; Norman Stone; Richard Overy; Orlando Figes; David Reynolds; Andrew Roberts; Christopher Andrew; Alain de Botton

Neil McKendrick MA FRHistS (born 28 July 1935) was the 40th Master of Gonville and Caius College, Cambridge. He is now a life fellow of the college.

McKendrick was educated at Alderman Newton's School, Leicester, and Christ's College, Cambridge, where he won an Entrance Scholarship. He is an Emeritus Reader in History having taught Modern English Social and Economic History as well as Business, Literature and Society, 1690–1990. He is also a fellow of the Royal Historical Society. During his time at the college he was successively Lecturer in History, Director of Studies in History, Graduate Tutor and Master.

McKendrick was Chairman of the college committee which presided over the plans for the Cockerell Building, now the College Library, the Auditorium, and the public rooms in Gonville Court, directed by neo-classical architect John Simpson. More recently, he was even more deeply involved in their completion and their formal openings by the Duke of Edinburgh and the Prince of Wales – and in the refurbishment of the Master's Lodge, also John Simpson's work.

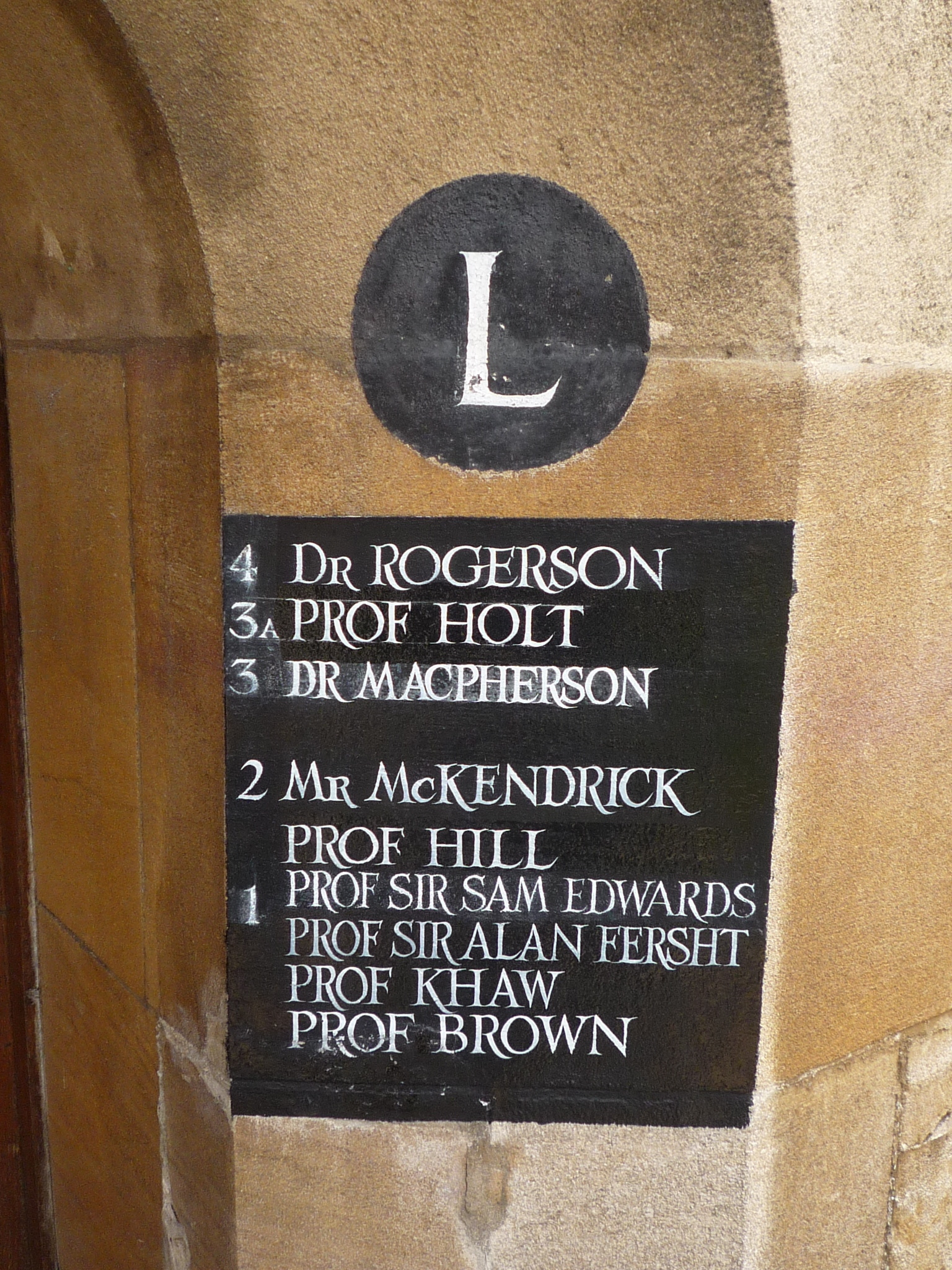
McKendrick's name on Staircase L at Gonville & Caius College, Cambridge in 2010.

Also under the Mastership of Neil McKendrick the College embarked on a fundraising appeal to support the construction of a new accommodation building, the Stephen Hawking Building, on the college's West Road site.

He featured in Pseuds Corner of Private Eye magazine:

There were, of course, some serious setbacks. The year 2000 saw Russia draw ahead of Caius in the number of [Nobel] prizes it has won.

— NEIL MCKENDRICK, Master of Gonville & Caius College Cambridge, writing in its annual record, The Caian
Pseuds Corner, Private Eye

McKendrick is the namesake of the Neil McKendrick Lectureship in History at Gonville and Caius College, University of Cambridge, currently held by Dr Melissa Calaresu.

== Offices held ==
Academic offices
| Preceded by Peter Gray | Master of Gonville and Caius College, Cambridge; 1996–2006 | Succeeded by Sir Christopher Hum |

== Publications ==
- McKendrick, N., 1982. 'The Commercialization of Fashion' in The Birth of a Consumer Society: The Commercialization of Eighteenth-Century England edited by Neil McKendrick, John Brewer and J.H. Plumb. London: Europa Publications Limited
- McKendrick, N., 1970. "Josiah Wedgwood and Cost Accounting in the Industrial Revolution". The Economic History Review. Vol. 23, No. 1, pp. 45–67. doi:10.1111/j.1468-0289.1970.tb01013.x
- McKendrick, N., 1964. "Josiah Wedgwood and Thomas Bentley: An Inventor-Entrepreneur Partnership in the Industrial Revolution". Transactions of the Royal Historical Society (Fifth Series). Vol. 14, pp. 1–33. doi:10.2307/3678942
- McKendrick, N., 1961. "Josiah Wedgwood and Factory Discipline". The Historical Journal. Vol. 4, No. 1, pp. 30–55.
- McKendrick, N., 1957. "Josiah Wedgwood and George Stubbs". History Today. Vol. 7, Issue 8.
