= Neath Port Talbot College =

Former further education institution in Wales

Coordinates: 51°40′00″N 3°48′51″W

Neath Port Talbot College (NPTC) was a further education institution established as two campuses in Port Talbot and Neath in Wales.

The college allowed study of many courses including GCSEs, AS Level/A levels, AGCEs, AVCEs, Adult Lifelong Learning Services, GNVQs at both Foundation and Intermediate levels.

Neath Port Talbot College also offered higher education courses or HND/Cs in various subjects related to their AVCE/AGCE courses, notably in Computing, Health & Social Care, Hospitality and Childcare.

After the County Borough of Neath Port Talbot was formed in 1996, plans were put through to merge the Afan College and Neath College as one. In 1997 this was achieved under the name of Neath Port Talbot College.

In August 2013 Neath Port Talbot College merged with Coleg Powys to become NPTC Group.

== History ==
Between the 1950s to the 1990s there was a Neath College and an Afan College; each college had their own administration and staff. Both colleges independently offered O levels, A levels, National Diplomas and other qualifications. When the boroughs of Neath and Port Talbot merged to form a unitary Authority in 1996, the two colleges decided to merge as one also. Instead of each campus being called Neath College and Afan College, it became Neath Campus and Afan Campus.

The college also had an outpost at Queen Street in Neath Town Centre, where the ECDL were offered and other part-time courses were available too. Further facilities were situated at Margam Country Park in Twyn Yr Hydd House from where the college ran its Management Training Centre, Horticulture Training Centre and Parc-Gro plant nursery.

== Campuses ==
=== Afan Campus ===
The Afan campus was located in the Margam district of Port Talbot.

=== Neath campus ===
The Neath campus was located on Dwr-y-Felin Road just to the northwest of Neath town centre.

The Canolfan Gelf Nidum Arts Centre was located on the Neath campus and included a 170-seat auditorium with cinema screen.

== Schools that linked to NPTC ==
Nearly all the schools that linked to Neath Port Talbot College were in the Neath Port Talbot area. 2

- Dwr-y-Felin Comprehensive School
- Dyffryn Comprehensive School
- Ysgol Gyfun Ystalyfera, Ystalyfera
- Cwrt Sart Comprehensive School
- Cwmtawe Comprehensive School, Pontardawe
- Glan Afan Comprehensive School, Port Talbot
- Sandfields Comprehensive School
- Cefn Saeson Comprehensive School
- Brynteg Comprehensive School
