= Andrew Vicari =

Welsh painter (1932–2016)

- Vicari in 2007
- Born: 20 April 1932; Port Talbot, Wales
- Died: 3 October 2016 (aged 84); Morriston Hospital, Swansea, Wales
- Education: Neath Grammar School
- Alma mater: Slade School of Fine Art
- Occupation: Artist

La Marianne (1980)

Andrew Vicari (born Andrea Antonio Giovanni Vaccari; 20 April 1932 – 3 October 2016) was a Welsh painter working in France, who established a career painting portraits of prominent people. Despite being largely unknown in his own country, as of 2004 Vicari was Britain's richest living painter, and at one time Britain's 18th richest person.

== Early life ==
Vicari was born in Port Talbot, Wales, in 1932 to Italian parents, Vittorio Vaccari ('tobacconist and confectioner'), and his wife, Italini Bertani, from Parma. He was evacuated to Aberdare during World War II. He later attended Neath Grammar School for Boys. Aged 12 he won the Gold Medal for Painting at the Wales National Eisteddfod. Between 1950 and 1952 he studied painting at the Slade School of Fine Art at University College London (UCL) under William Coldstream and occasionally Lucian Freud as teachers. He had initially been refused a place at the Slade and was only admitted when someone dropped out.

== Career ==
After only two years, in 1952, Vicari left the Slade without completing his diploma course and went to Florence. He stayed there and in Rome for two years before returning 'penniless' to the UK. He then began working in London as a portrait painter and in 1961 a large show of his work was put on in the former Debenhams showroom near Leicester Square financed by the band leader and impresario Jack Hylton. Eschewing modern trends, he remained a figurative artist working in oil. His work is appreciated worldwide, especially in the Middle East where three museums are solely dedicated to his work.

In 1974, Vicari was appointed as the official painter to the King and Government of Saudi Arabia. In the following decades, he painted many portraits of the Saudi royal family as well as scenes of Riyadh and Bedouin life. It is largely due to this patronage that Vicari owed his financial success and in 2011 earned him the title "The Rembrandt of Riyadh" from The New York Times. In 2001, he sold a collection of 125 paintings of the First Gulf War to Prince Khaled for £17 million.

== Personal life ==
Vicari lived and worked at his studio outside Nice, France, although he also owned apartments in Riyadh and Monte Carlo.

In 2006 his fortune was valued at £92 million by the Sunday Times Rich List. In October 2014, however, it was reported that Vicari had filed for bankruptcy and had been in poor health.

Vicari died at Morriston Hospital, Swansea on 3 October 2016 at the age of 84.
