= Cymer Afan Comprehensive School =

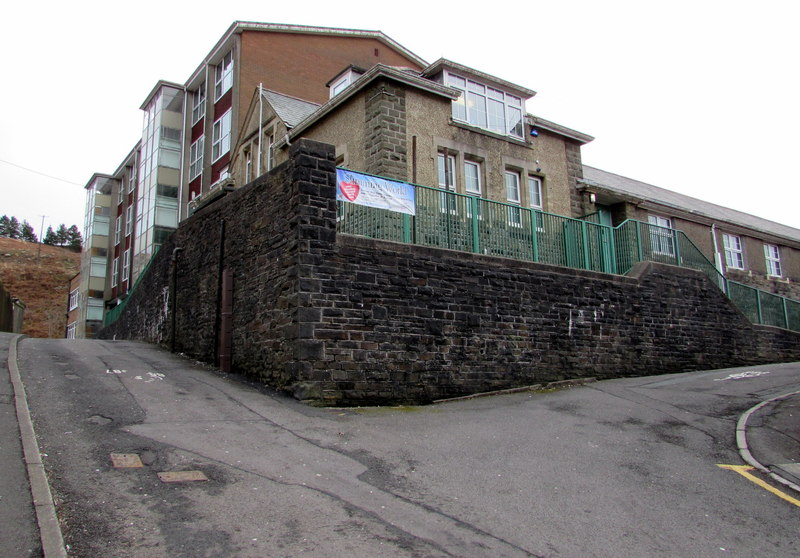

Location
- School Road; Cymmer, Port Talbot, SA13 3EL; Wales

Information
- Type: Comprehensive school
- Opened: 1932
- Closed: 2019
- Local authority: Neath Port Talbot
- Department for Education URN: 401778 Tables
- Staff: 23 teaching, 39 support
- Gender: Mixed
- Age: 11 to 16
- Enrolment: 229 (as of October 2018)
- Capacity: 640
- Website: https://cymer-afan-comprehensive-school.j2bloggy.com/

Cymer Afan Comprehensive School was a comprehensive school, located in Cymmer, Neath Port Talbot, Wales. It offered mixed-sex education to around 200 pupils aged 11–16. In November 2017, plans were announced to close the school. Following two failed court appeals, the school closed in July 2019.

== Planned closure and reactions ==
=== Background ===
In November 2017, plans were announced to close Cymer Afan on 31 August 2019. Consultation started on 11 December 2017, ending on 26 January 2018. The reasons for the planned closure included the school's £3m maintenance bill, the high amount of money spent on the school's pupils compared to other schools in the area, and the large gap between the school's capacity of 640 pupils and the 229 on roll.

In June 2018, members of Neath Port Talbot County Borough Council voted in support of the school's closure.

=== Legal action ===
A community action group of parents was formed to oppose the plans, their legal representative calling the plan "a death sentence for the community". A judicial review was prepared for the group, focusing on the Well-being of Future Generations (Wales) Act 2015. The BBC described the group's aims as being "landmark".

In December 2018, solicitors representing the group served the council with notice of a judicial review application. The High Court saw the case in March 2019, but dismissed it on the grounds that judicial review was not the appropriate way to enforce the Future Generations Act. A second judge also dismissed the review.

=== Other responses to the plans ===
A council report showed 433 written objections from pupils, parents, staff and members of the community, including Stephen Kinnock, the MP for Aberavon. A petition with 2007 signatures was also received.

The school's chair of governors opposed the planned closure, calling it a "devastating blow" to the area.

The National Education Union criticised the plans, arguing that the council "failed to safeguard the jobs of staff" and "did not adequately consult" the local community. However, council leader Robert Jones stated that he was "100% confident" in their consultation process.

== Aftermath ==
Following the dismissal of the judicial reviews, the school closed in July 2019. A report indicated the presence of asbestos within the school, and plans were put before the council to demolish the building.

A majority of students transferred to Ysgol Cwm Brombil, a new-build school in Margam.
