= Gwyn Hall =

Theatre in Neath, Wales

The Gwyn Hall
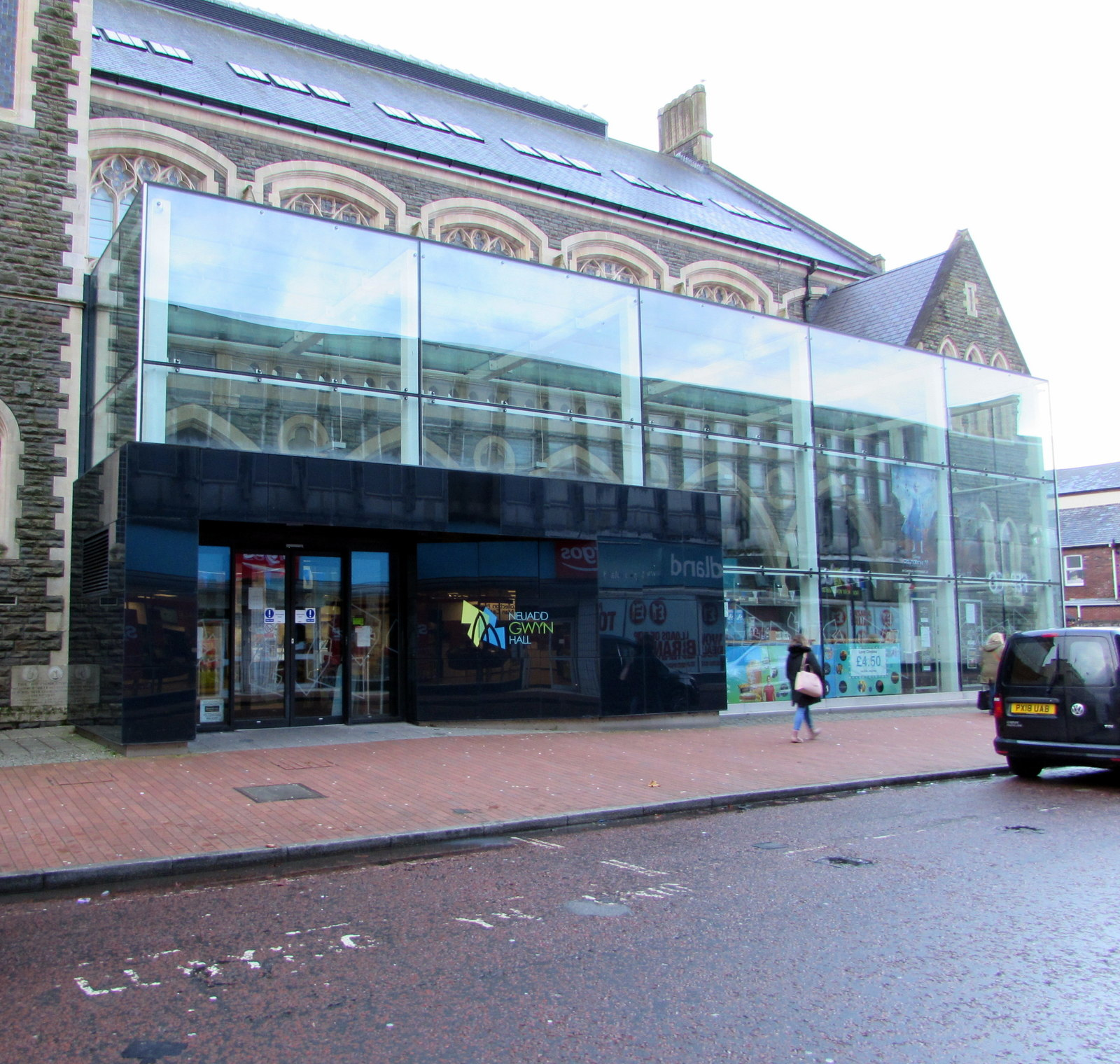
- Glass frontage, Gwyn Hall

- Location within Neath Port Talbot
- Address: Orchard Street, SA11 1DU; Neath; Wales
- Coordinates: 51.6628°N 3.8041°W
- Owner: Neath Port Talbot Council
- Operator: Celtic Community Leisure
- Type: Local authority
- Capacity: 396

Construction
- Opened: 1887
- Rebuilt: 2012, Holder Mathias
- Architect: John Norton

Website
- www.gwynhall.com

The Gwyn Hall was previously a four-storey Victorian theatre in the town centre of Neath, Wales. Following a fire in 2007 it was substantially rebuilt, retaining its facade but moving the theatre to the ground floor, with flexible seating configurations. The third floor houses a cinema pod and a third screen for films with retractable seating. In addition, a glass atrium cafe was added to the frontage which was previously the car park.

== History ==
Gwyn Hall was originally built in 1887 on land given by Howel Gwyn. The theatre was built by English architect John Norton at a cost of £6,000, who had also built the church, St David's, which sits on the other side of the road. The completion of the building was commemorated by the unveiling of a statue of Howel Gwyn outside the hall by Sir John Dillwyn-Llewellyn, 1st Baronet on 26 September 1888. The positioning of the statue caused controversy at the time as it was thought that it would interfere with traffic. Subsequently, in 1967, the statue was moved to its present position in the nearby Victoria Gardens.

The building was used as a music hall and also served as a meeting place for council business until the construction of the Neath Civic Centre in the 1960s. Classical concerts were held at the hall, including a performance of Handel's Messiah, upon receiving an organ given by the widow of Howel Gwyn in November 1889.

While undergoing a £4m refurbishment in October 2007, Gwyn Hall was almost destroyed by fire. The hall has undergone extensive reconstruction and modernisation with work completed in 2012. The work included a 3D cinema, a public café bar, a new theatre with retractable seating for films and live shows and a flexible studio space.
