= NPTC Group of Colleges =

Further education college in Wales

Coordinates: 51°40′2″N 3°48′52″W

- Welsh: Grŵp Colegau NPTC
- Motto: More Than Just an Education
- Type: Further education college
- Established: 1931
- Chief executive: Mark Dacey
- Students: 20,000
- Location: Neath Port Talbot and Powys, Wales
- Website: nptcgroup.ac.uk

The NPTC Group of Colleges (Welsh: Grŵp Colegau NPTC) is a further education college in Wales, with campuses throughout Neath Port Talbot and Powys. It was formed following the merger of Neath Port Talbot College (NPTC) and Coleg Powys on 1 August 2013.

The college offers a programme of full-time, part-time, and higher education courses across its 8 campuses.

== Provision ==
NPTC Group offers a wide range of further education courses including A levels, BTECs and other vocational courses; the college offers higher education and part-time courses, including certificates, diplomas, BSc and BAs. NPTC Group of Colleges is a collaborative partner of the University of South Wales, University of Wales Trinity Saint David, Wrexham Glyndŵr University, and Pearson.

== Former students ==
Some notable former students include Michael Sheen, Dan Lydiate, Ashley Beck, James Hook, Justin Tipuric, Duncan Jones and Paul James.
