= Glan Afan Comprehensive School =

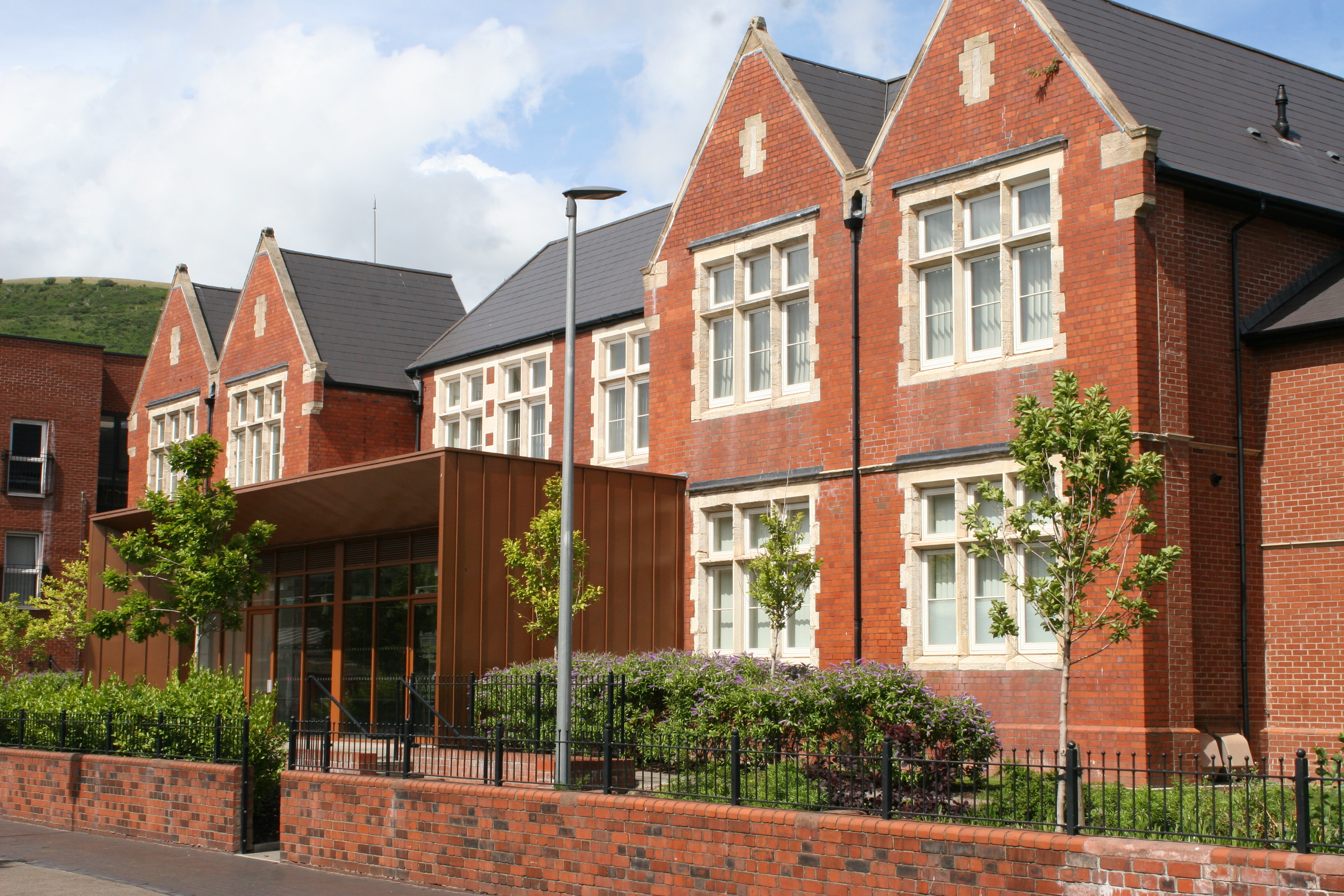

Location
- Station Road; Port Talbot, Neath Port Talbot, SA13 1LZ; Wales; 51.5954°N 3.7825°W

Information
- Type: Comprehensive
- Motto: A Ddioddefws a Orfu (By Striving We Succeed)
- Established: 1896
- Closed: July 2016
- Local authority: Neath Port Talbot
- Headteacher: Mike Gibbons
- Deputy Headteacher: Richard Rees
- Staff: Approx. 50+
- Gender: Co-educational
- Age: 11 (Year 7) to 16 (Year 11)
- Enrolment: Approx 500+
- Houses: Glyndwr, Llewellyn, Rhys, Tudor
- Colours: Red, Black
- Closed to Facilitate: Ysgol Bae Baglan

Glan Afan Comprehensive School (Welsh: Ysgol Gyfun Glan Afan) was a mixed comprehensive school which served the town of Port Talbot, Wales, and its surrounding areas for 120 years. It was opened in 1896 as Port Talbot Intermediate School under the provisions of the Welsh Intermediate Education Act 1889. The school closed in July 2016 to facilitate the merger of Glan Afan itself, Cwrt Sart Comprehensive, Sandfields Comprehensive and Traethmelyn Primary School into the ultra-modern £40 million 'super-school', Ysgol Bae Baglan.

== History ==
The school was founded in 1896 as Port Talbot Intermediate School and later named the Port Talbot County School. The grammar school took the name Glan Afan in 1951 and in 1959 became Glan Afan Grammar Technical School. In 1965 following the introduction of comprehensive education in Port Talbot the school undertook a further name change, and merged with Velindre Secondary Modern School to become Glan Afan Comprehensive School, taking pupils up to the age of 18. At that time the school's name was written as "Glanafan" rather than "Glan Afan". The school operated from the sites of both the old Grammar and Secondary Modern schools (about a mile apart) and children were regularly bussed between sites during the school day.

The sixth form was moved to Afan College after 1986.

From 1974 to 1996, it was administered by West Glamorgan County Council. In 1996, the Neath Port Talbot County Borough Council was formed, and the school is currently administered by Neath Port Talbot's LEA.

In 2011, Neath Port Talbot LEA announced that Glan Afan School and three other schools will be closed to facilitate a new 'Super' Comprehensive and Primary School. The school was given the name 'Ysgol Bae Baglan' or 'Baglan Bay School' as the name suggests is situated in Baglan Bay on Western Avenue. The facility is now completed and in full function with all pupils from the 4 merging schools transferring to the new site.

== The School Curriculum ==
Until its closure, the school delivered the National Curriculum at Key Stage 3, (years 7, 8 and 9), and Key Stage 4 (Years 10 and 11).

The curriculum is organised in order to give a broad and balanced experience meeting the needs of all pupils including those with additional learning needs. All pupils have the opportunity to study Welsh culture within individual subjects. The school also organises an annual Eisteddfod and participates successfully at Local and National Urdd Eisteddfoda.

=== Key Stage 3 ===
At Key Stage 3, pupils study English, mathematics and science (the core subjects). It also includes these foundation subjects: history, geography, RE, French, Welsh, art, music, technology, ICT, games, PSE and PE. Drama is offered as part of the skills module. In years 7 and 8 pupils have the opportunity to obtain the Key Skills qualifications of Communication, Application of Number and Working with Others at Level 1.

=== Key Stage 4 ===
At Key Stage 4, pupils follow a compulsory curriculum of English, mathematics, science, games, RE, Welsh, PSE and ICT (Short Course). They then choose from a variety of subjects organised into option groups. They can choose from GCSE, Vocational GCSE and BTEC vocational courses which are linked with Neath Port Talbot College or other providers.

At Key Stage 4, the school actively monitors and targets pupils to identify underachievement and provides Learning Coach support and mentoring to help pupils with their GCSE studies.

All Year 10 and 11 pupils follow a Personal and Social Education Course, and a programme of Careers Guidance. During year 10 they participate in a week of work experience.

== Extra-curricular activities ==
The school ran several clubs, either during lunchtime or after school, including clubs for sports, such as football, hockey, gymnastics, tag rugby, basketball, netball and dodgeball; and curriculum-based clubs including Club Urdd, Computer Club, English 'Shooting Stars', Choir, Eco-committee and Art Club.

The school ran a community group called Glan Afan Silver Surfers for senior citizens. This was recognised by the High Sheriff of West Glamorgan and the Wales Volunteer of the Year Awards.

== Notable alumni ==
- Bennett Arron, writer, comedian
- Leondre Devries, rapper
- Richard Hibbard, rugby union player
- James Hook, rugby union player
- Gareth Jones, conductor
- Andy Legg, footballer
- Michael Sheen, actor
- Steve Williams, rugby union player

=== Port Talbot County School ===
- David Carpanini, artist and academic
- Edward Howel Francis, professor of Earth Sciences from 1977 to 1989 at the University of Leeds, and president from 1980 to 1982 of the Geological Society of London
- Geraint Griffiths, singer
- Clive Jenkins, trade union leader, General Secretary from 1970 to 1988 of the Association of Scientific, Technical and Managerial Staffs
- Gwyn Jones, director from 1968 to 1977 of the National Museum of Wales, and professor of Physics from 1953 to 1968 at Queen Mary College
- Moelwyn Merchant, professor of English from 1961 to 1974 at the University of Exeter
- Keith Peters, Regius Professor of Physic (Cambridge) from 1987 to 2005, chairman from 1994 to 1998 of the National Radiological Protection Board (NRPB)
- Charlie Pugh, rugby union player
- Edwin Regan, Bishop of Wrexham since 1994
- Alun Thomas, rugby union player
- Brinley Thomas, professor of Economics from 1946 to 1973 at University College, Cardiff
- Gerwyn Williams, rugby union player
