= Jean Rech =

French aerodynamicist

Jean Rech (1931 - December 2017) was a French aerodynamicist, and the chief aerodynamicist for Concorde, on the French division. He also took the role of chief ATR designer, then worked on senior R&D positions at Airbus before retiring.

== Early life ==
He attended École nationale supérieure de l'aéronautique et de l'espace (known as Supaéro).

== Career ==
=== Aérospatiale ===
He worked for Sud Aviation and Aérospatiale on Concorde, and then on its ATR division (with Aeritalia of Italy).

== Personal life ==
He had two children, Pierre and Geneviève. He died aged 86 in December 2017.

== Publications ==
- Concorde aerodynamics and associated systems development (with Clive Leyman), ISBN 1563473089
