= List of regular mini-sections in Private Eye =

The following is a list of regularly appearing mini-sections appearing in the British satirical magazine Private Eye. These are mostly based on clippings from newspapers sent in by readers, often for a cash fee.

== Birtspeak 2.0 ==
A column giving examples of especially convoluted and impenetrable jargon from the BBC. Named after former Director-General of the BBC John Birt, who was particularly associated with that kind of language. Following his departure, extracts are almost always taken from BBC job adverts or press releases announcing senior BBC appointments. The column features an illustration of a Dalek, a reference to Dennis Potter's 1993 James MacTaggart Memorial lecture where he described Birt (alongside Marmaduke Hussey) as a "croak-voiced Dalek".

== Commentatorballs ==
A collection of gaffes from radio and TV perpetrated by sports commentators and sportsmen, featuring inconsistencies, mixed metaphors, or otherwise ludicrous statements, such as "he's missed the goal by literally a million miles" or "if they played like this every week they wouldn't be so inconsistent". This feature was originally called Colemanballs and specialised in quotes from British sports commentator David Coleman, but expanded to quotes from others, notably including Murray Walker. The name of this feature has since spawned derivative collections such as "Warballs" (spurious references to the September 11 attacks), "Dianaballs" (unduly sentimental references to Diana, Princess of Wales). Any other subject can be covered, as long as it is appropriately suffixed by -balls, such as Tsunamiballs.

== Dumb Britain ==
Bizarre, ignorant or otherwise humorous answers to questions given by contestants on British television and radio quiz shows, compiled by Marcus Berkmann. Occasionally, Dumb America, Dumb Ireland, Dumb Australia and other countries are also featured.

== Eye Spy ==
Pictures sent in by readers showing contradictory, ironic, amusing, scatological, or otherwise amusing images. For example, a temporary "Polling Station" sign situated next to a "Do not sit on the fence" notice, and an Indonesian restaurant named "Caffe Bog".

== Going Live ==
Highlighting the often unnecessary use by rolling news programmes of outside broadcasts, where reporters speak to camera simply as an alternative to broadcasting a studio-based commentary, even if they have no new insight to offer from the scene.

== Harsh Words ==
An occasional series devoted to unusual callousness in public, such as a former neighbour of Jill Dando remarking that, "the shooting left a horrible atmosphere here for a while. It made you aware of all the terrible things that go on. But I don't think it has affected house prices."

== Just Fancy That! ==
A spot highlighting contradictions or hypocrisy in pairs of statements from individuals or newspapers.

== Lookalikes ==
The letters page usually features a submission comparing two famous individuals who look alike; frequently the two have an ironic connection too which is pointed out by the reader who submits the piece. The captions relating to the two individuals are invariably swapped around, implying that even the magazine cannot tell which individual is which. The sender often finishes with the phrase "might they perhaps be related?" and/or "I think we should be told." This feature was copied by the American Spy magazine in its "Separated at Birth?" section.

On one occasion, Robert Maxwell successfully sued the Eye for printing a made-up letter 'lookaliking' him with one of the Kray twins. Although the comparison was deemed an artistic interpretation and not amenable at law, the facts that (a) the letter had been composed by Richard Ingrams and (b) that the magazine often hinted (correctly, as it turned out) that Maxwell was a crook, were taken as proof of defamatory intent.

== Luvvies ==
Reader-submitted feature listing humorously pretentious quotations from actors and other theatrical celebrities. The term "luvvie" pre-dates the magazine as a derogatory noun for pretentious, overblown, narcissistic people of an artistic or dramatic bent. The column was briefly renamed Trevvies for several issues in the mid-1990s after Trevor Nunn described use of the term as offensive "as calling a black man a nigger".

== The Neophiliacs ==
Examples of journalists employing the cliché "x is the new y", e.g. "Black is the new brown" or "Basel is the new St Tropez". Even after a recent trend for certain journalists to preface their remarks with "At the risk of appearing in Private Eye...", remarks of this kind have not prevented many such journalists from receiving entries in the column, and Ian Hislop, editor of the Eye, was quoted himself in one issue.

== Newspaper misprints ==
Quoting amusing misprints from newspapers or unintentionally funny examples of journalism, this section appears throughout the magazine. These often feature misprinted TV guides, such as a programme called "It Came from Outer Space" being illustrated by a picture of David Cameron speaking in the House of Commons. Frequent inclusion in this section gave The Guardian a reputation for common typographical errors, earning it the nickname The Grauniad. The domains www.grauniad.com and www.grauniad.co.uk redirect to The Guardian's website at www.theguardian.com.

== Number Crunching ==
Comparing numerical figures relating to a current event with others that make the event seem comical, bizarre, irrelevant or despicable.

== Ongoing situations ==
Subtitled "with meaningful and viable scenarios at this moment in time". Recording the nonsense rampant in "on the spot" interviews beginning in the 1970s, as television news coverage went live outside the studio, leading to unrehearsed speeches which naturally tended toward currently fashionable clichés (for example, instead of "there is a siege", "we have an ongoing siege situation").

== Order Of The Brown Nose (O.B.N.) ==
Highlighting the behaviour of those who have allegedly been sycophantic to those in authority, particularly in media and politics, such as Phil Hall, former editor of the News of the World (owned by Rupert Murdoch) declaring Rupert Murdoch "the world's greatest living journalist."

== Pedantry Corner ==
A sub-section of the letters page devoted to pedantic corrections of or additions to previous articles or readers' letters. Under its previous title, 'Pedants Corner', this included several letters on the use of the apostrophe in "Pedants'", which has variously appeared as "Pedants", "Pedant's" or "Ped'ants Corner". It was renamed "Pedantry Corner" in 2008 following a reader’s suggestion.

== Pseuds Corner ==
Listing pretentious, pseudo-intellectual quotations from the media. At various times different columnists have been frequent entrants, with varied reactions. In the 1970s, Pamela Vandyke Price, a Sunday Times wine columnist, wrote to the magazine complaining that "every time I describe a wine as anything other than red or white, dry or wet, I wind up in Pseuds Corner".

== Solutions ==
Instances of companies adopting an unimaginative buzzword by claiming to provide 'solutions' where a simpler phrasing would seem more appropriate, such as describing cardboard boxes as "Christmas Ornament Storage Solutions".
