= Cefn Saeson =

UK secondary school

Coordinates: 51°39′02″N 3°46′32″W

Cefn Saeson (Ysgol Gyfun Cefn Saeson) is a mixed, English-medium comprehensive school in the Cimla suburb of Neath, Wales. The school serves 11 to 16-year-olds living in Cimla, Tonna, Tonmawr, Pontrhydyfen and parts of Neath. The school is located on Afan Valley Road. A new school was built in 2021 on the football field of the existing school dating from the early 1970s and now demolished. 'Cefn' can have a meaning in English of mountain ridge and 'Saeson' means Englishman. The school motto is 'Bid Ben, Bid Bont' ('To be a leader, one must be a bridge')

== Teaching awards ==
Former headmaster, Alun Griffiths, received the 2005 award for Headteacher of the Year in the Welsh division of the Teaching Awards. Former deputy headmaster, Peter Jones, has recently won the Ted Wragg Lifetime Achievement Award, given at a large gala in central London by Lenny Henry and broadcast on BBC2.

== Notable alumni ==
- Thomas Haffield (born 1988), Olympic swimmer
- Sian James (born 1959), MP for Swansea East
- Steve Tandy (born 1980), Rugby Union Player and Coach.
