= 1995 Neath Port Talbot County Borough Council election =

1995 Welsh local government election

The first election to Neath Port Talbot County Borough Council was held on 4 May 1995. It was followed by the 1999 election. On the same day there were elections to the other 21 local authorities in Wales and community councils in Wales.

== Overview ==
All council seats were up for election. These were the first elections held following local government reorganisation and the abolition of West Glamorgan County Council. The ward boundaries for the new authority were based on the previous Lliw Valley Borough Council, Neath Borough Council and Swansea City Council although the number of members elected for individual wards was reduced. Conservative candidates were heavily defeated.

Neath and Port Talbot County Borough Council election result 1995
| Party | Seats | Gains | Losses | Net gain/loss | Seats % | Votes % | Votes | +/− |
|---|---|---|---|---|---|---|---|---|
| Labour | | | | | | | | |
| Conservative | | | | | | | | |
| Liberal Democrats | | | | | | | | |
| Plaid Cymru | | | | | | | | |
| Other parties | 5 | | | | | | | |
| SDP | 2 | | | | | | | |
| Green | 0 | | | | | | | |

== Candidates ==
Most sitting members of West Glamorgan County council sought election to the new authority. A number were also members of the previous district councils but others contested a ward against a sitting district councillor.

== Results by ward ==
=== Aberavon (three seats) ===
Aberavon 1995
| Party | Candidate | Votes | % | ±% |
|---|---|---|---|---|
| SDP | Anthony Taylor | 1,080 | | |
| Labour | Ken Johnson | 955 | | |
| Labour | Andrew Brian Jones | 898 | | |
| SDP | Jeffrey Dinham | 889 | | |
| Labour | John Sparks | 794 | | |
| SDP | Thomas John Sullivan | 765 | | |
| Turnout | | | 46.9 | |
| SDP win (new seat) | | | | |
| Labour win (new seat) | | | | |
| Labour win (new seat) | | | | |

=== Aberdulais (one seat) ===
Aberdulais 1995
| Party | Candidate | Votes | % | ±% |
|---|---|---|---|---|
| Labour | Elwyn Jones | 701 | | |
| Liberal Democrats | Bryan Cummings | 86 | | |
| Majority | | 615 | | |
| Turnout | | | 54.3 | |
| Labour win (new seat) | | | | |

=== Alltwen (one seat) ===
Alltwen 1995
| Party | Candidate | Votes | % | ±% |
|---|---|---|---|---|
| Labour | David Lewis | 646 | | |
| Plaid Cymru | Dewi Evans | 403 | | |
| Majority | | 243 | | |
| Turnout | | | 60.0 | |
| Labour win (new seat) | | | | |

=== Baglan (three seats) ===
Baglan 1995
| Party | Candidate | Votes | % | ±% |
|---|---|---|---|---|
| Labour | Malcolm Harris+ | 1,455 | | |
| Ratepayers | Arthur Edward Wheatley | 1,370 | | |
| Ratepayers | Glenys Crompton | 1,333 | | |
| Labour | Leslie Rees | 1,287 | | |
| Ratepayers | John Awbery | 1,262 | | |
| Labour | Marian Golding | 1,212 | | |
| Turnout | | | 52.0 | |
| Labour win (new seat) | | | | |
| Ratepayers win (new seat) | | | | |
| Ratepayers win (new seat) | | | | |

=== Blaengwrach (one seat) ===
Blaengwrach 1995
| Party | Candidate | Votes | % | ±% |
|---|---|---|---|---|
| Labour | David Hughes | 510 | | |
| Plaid Cymru | Carolyn Edwards | 388 | | |
| Majority | | 122 | | |
| Turnout | | | 58.0 | |
| Labour win (new seat) | | | | |

=== Briton Ferry East (one seat) ===
Briton Ferry East 1995
| Party | Candidate | Votes | % | ±% |
|---|---|---|---|---|
| Labour | Colin Morgan | 734 | | |
| Plaid Cymru | Sylvia Tudor | 250 | | |
| Independent | Graham Thompson | 142 | | |
| Majority | | 484 | | |
| Turnout | | | 45.0 | |
| Labour win (new seat) | | | | |

=== Briton Ferry West (one seat) ===
Briton Ferry West 1995
| Party | Candidate | Votes | % | ±% |
|---|---|---|---|---|
| Labour | Stan Atherton | unopposed | | |
| Labour win (new seat) | | | | |

=== Bryn and Cwmavon (three seats) ===
Bryn and Cwmavon 1995
| Party | Candidate | Votes | % | ±% |
|---|---|---|---|---|
| Labour | Mel John+ | 1,711 | | |
| Labour | Gaynor Williams | 1,437 | | |
| Labour | Tom Morgans | 1,296 | | |
| Liberal Democrats | Marilyn Harris | 942 | | |
| Independent Labour | Bryn Roblin | 904 | | |
| Liberal Democrats | Raymond Pursey | 585 | | |
| Turnout | | | 51.8 | |
| Labour win (new seat) | | | | |
| Labour win (new seat) | | | | |
| Labour win (new seat) | | | | |

=== Bryncoch North (one seat) ===
Bryncoch North 1995
| Party | Candidate | Votes | % | ±% |
|---|---|---|---|---|
| Labour | Royston Jones | 479 | | |
| Plaid Cymru | Philip Cockwell | 444 | | |
| Majority | | 35 | | |
| Turnout | | | 48.4 | |
| Labour win (new seat) | | | | |

=== Bryncoch South (two seats) ===
Bryncoch South 1995
| Party | Candidate | Votes | % | ±% |
|---|---|---|---|---|
| Labour | Iris Hobbs | 915 | | |
| Labour | Kenneth Palmer | 819 | | |
| Plaid Cymru | Gareth Richards | 509 | | |
| Plaid Cymru | Martyn Peters | 485 | | |
| Turnout | | | 48.3 | |
| Labour win (new seat) | | | | |
| Labour win (new seat) | | | | |

=== Cadoxton (one seat) ===
Cadoxton 1995
| Party | Candidate | Votes | % | ±% |
|---|---|---|---|---|
| Labour | Graham Hughes | 481 | | |
| Liberal Democrats | Roger Parkinson | 57 | | |
| Majority | | 424 | | |
| Turnout | | | 48.3 | |
| Labour win (new seat) | | | | |

=== Cimla (two seats) ===
Cimla 1995
| Party | Candidate | Votes | % | ±% |
|---|---|---|---|---|
| Labour | Reg Teale | 921 | | |
| Liberal Democrats | John Warman | 761 | | |
| Labour | David George Williams | 543 | | |
| Plaid Cymru | William Havard | 151 | | |
| Plaid Cymru | Raymond Pooley | 120 | | |
| Turnout | | | 40.5 | |
| Labour win (new seat) | | | | |
| Liberal Democrats win (new seat) | | | | |

=== Coedffranc Central (two seats) ===
Coedffranc Central 1995
| Party | Candidate | Votes | % | ±% |
|---|---|---|---|---|
| Wales Democratic Left | Glaslyn Morgan | 787 | | |
| Independent | Betsan Powell | 760 | | |
| Labour | David Davies | 732 | | |
| Labour | Jim Bond | 501 | | |
| Turnout | | | 49.9 | |
| Others win (new seat) | | | | |
| Independent win (new seat) | | | | |

=== Coedffranc North (one seat) ===
Coedffranc North 1995
| Party | Candidate | Votes | % | ±% |
|---|---|---|---|---|
| Liberal Democrats | Keith Davies | 379 | | |
| Independent | Jean Phillips | 277 | | |
| Labour | Beryl Florance | 248 | | |
| Majority | | 102 | | |
| Turnout | | | 47.8 | |
| Liberal Democrats win (new seat) | | | | |

=== Coedffranc West (one seat) ===
Coedffranc West 1995
| Party | Candidate | Votes | % | ±% |
|---|---|---|---|---|
| Labour | Ray Williams | 590 | | |
| Liberal Democrats | Robert Lloyd | 170 | | |
| Majority | | 420 | | |
| Turnout | | | 46.0 | |
| Labour win (new seat) | | | | |

=== Crynant (one seat) ===
Crynant 1995
| Party | Candidate | Votes | % | ±% |
|---|---|---|---|---|
| Labour | Lyn Harper | unopposed | | |
| Labour win (new seat) | | | | |

=== Cwmllynfell (one seat) ===
Cwmllynfell 1995
| Party | Candidate | Votes | % | ±% |
|---|---|---|---|---|
| Labour | Idwal Griffiths | unopposed | | |
| Labour win (new seat) | | | | |

=== Cymmer (one seat) ===
Cymmer 1995
| Party | Candidate | Votes | % | ±% |
|---|---|---|---|---|
| Labour | David Stokes | 718 | | |
| Independent | Mairwen Goodridge | 551 | | |
| Majority | | 167 | | |
| Turnout | | | 51.0 | |
| Labour win (new seat) | | | | |

=== Dyffryn (one seat) ===
Dyffryn 1995
| Party | Candidate | Votes | % | ±% |
|---|---|---|---|---|
| Plaid Cymru | Stephen Absalom | 759 | | |
| Labour | Norman Thomas | 504 | | |
| Majority | | 255 | | |
| Turnout | | | 51.0 | |
| Plaid Cymru win (new seat) | | | | |

=== Glyncorrwg (one seat) ===
Glyncorrwg 1995
| Party | Candidate | Votes | % | ±% |
|---|---|---|---|---|
| Labour | Glyn Rawlins | unopposed | | |
| Labour win (new seat) | | | | |

=== Glynneath (two seats) ===
Glynneath 1995
| Party | Candidate | Votes | % | ±% |
|---|---|---|---|---|
| Plaid Cymru | Del Morgan | 977 | | |
| Labour | David Williams | 976 | | |
| Labour | Jacqueline Joseph | 617 | | |
| Plaid Cymru | Horace Lewis | 542 | | |
| Turnout | | | 56.0 | |
| Plaid Cymru win (new seat) | | | | |
| Labour win (new seat) | | | | |

=== Godre'r Graig (one seat) ===
Godre'rgraig 1995
| Party | Candidate | Votes | % | ±% |
|---|---|---|---|---|
| Labour | Sharon Mainwaring | 342 | | |
| Plaid Cymru | Rosalyn Davies | 246 | | |
| Majority | | 96 | | |
| Turnout | | | 49.0 | |
| Labour win (new seat) | | | | |

=== Gwaun Cae Gurwen (one seat) ===
Gwaun Cae Gurwen 1995
| Party | Candidate | Votes | % | ±% |
|---|---|---|---|---|
| Labour | Gwenda Thomas | unopposed | | |
| Labour win (new seat) | | | | |

=== Gwynfi (one seat) ===
Gwynfi 1995
| Party | Candidate | Votes | % | ±% |
|---|---|---|---|---|
| Progressive Labour | David Evans | 640 | | |
| Labour | Malcolm Reeves | 263 | | |
| Majority | | | | |
| Turnout | | | | |
| Others win (new seat) | | | | |

=== Lower Brynamman (one seat) ===
Lower Brynamman 1995
| Party | Candidate | Votes | % | ±% |
|---|---|---|---|---|
| Labour | Arwyn Woolcock | 468 | | |
| Plaid Cymru | Will John Evans | 211 | | |
| Majority | | | | |
| Turnout | | | | |
| Labour win (new seat) | | | | |

=== Margam (one seat) ===
Margam 1995
| Party | Candidate | Votes | % | ±% |
|---|---|---|---|---|
| Labour | Stanley Mason | unopposed | | |
| Labour win (new seat) | | | | |

=== Neath East (three seats) ===
Neath East 1995
| Party | Candidate | Votes | % | ±% |
|---|---|---|---|---|
| Labour | Bill Cotton | 1,543 | | |
| Labour | Charles Henrywood | 1,520 | | |
| Labour | Mel Pearson | 1,477 | | |
| Liberal Democrats | Joyce Chambers-Rennison | 293 | | |
| Turnout | | | | |
| Labour win (new seat) | | | | |
| Labour win (new seat) | | | | |
| Labour win (new seat) | | | | |

=== Neath North (two seats) ===
Neath North 1995
| Party | Candidate | Votes | % | ±% |
|---|---|---|---|---|
| Labour | Frank Evans | 722 | | |
| Labour | Derek Vaughan | 682 | | |
| Independent Labour | Clive Thomas | 680 | | |
| Independent Labour | Margaret Williams | 656 | | |
| Plaid Cymru | Janet Francis | 180 | | |
| Plaid Cymru | Susan Griffiths | 133 | | |
| Conservative | Gwilym Levell | 96 | | |
| Turnout | | | | |
| Labour win (new seat) | | | | |
| Labour win (new seat) | | | | |

=== Neath South (two seats) ===
Neath South 1995
| Party | Candidate | Votes | % | ±% |
|---|---|---|---|---|
| Labour | Malcolm Gunter | 1,038 | | |
| Labour | Peter Rees | 927 | | |
| Liberal Democrats | Richard Moth | 316 | | |
| Turnout | | | | |
| Labour win (new seat) | | | | |
| Labour win (new seat) | | | | |

=== Onllwyn (one seat) ===
Onllwyn 1995
| Party | Candidate | Votes | % | ±% |
|---|---|---|---|---|
| Labour | Alan Thomas | unopposed | | |
| Labour win (new seat) | | | | |

=== Pelenna (one seat) ===
Pelenna 1995
| Party | Candidate | Votes | % | ±% |
|---|---|---|---|---|
| Labour | Malcolm Jones | 408 | | |
| Plaid Cymru | Rosalind Thomas | 206 | | |
| Majority | | | | |
| Turnout | | | | |
| Labour win (new seat) | | | | |

=== Pontardawe (two seats) ===
Pontardawe 1995
| Party | Candidate | Votes | % | ±% |
|---|---|---|---|---|
| Labour | Rhys Daniel | 1,051 | | |
| Labour | Des Flook | 1,036 | | |
| Plaid Cymru | John Morgan | 491 | | |
| Independent | Huw Llewelyn Williams | 462 | | |
| Liberal Democrats | Francis Little | 137 | | |
| Turnout | | | | |
| Labour win (new seat) | | | | |
| Labour win (new seat) | | | | |

=== Port Talbot (three seats) ===
Port Talbot 1995
| Party | Candidate | Votes | % | ±% |
|---|---|---|---|---|
| Ratepayers | Pamela Spender | 906 | | |
| Labour | Jennifer Dando | 839 | | |
| Labour | Viv Lewis | 822 | | |
| Independent | Ted Miles | 792 | | |
| Labour | Richard Thomas | 774 | | |
| Ratepayers | David Williams | 739 | | |
| Turnout | | | | |
| Others win (new seat) | | | | |
| Labour win (new seat) | | | | |
| Labour win (new seat) | | | | |

=== Resolven (one seat) ===
Resolven 1995
| Party | Candidate | Votes | % | ±% |
|---|---|---|---|---|
| Labour | Desmond Davies | 874 | | |
| Independent Labour | Dennis Williams | 333 | | |
| Plaid Cymru | Trefor Jones | 278 | | |
| Majority | | | | |
| Turnout | | | | |
| Labour win (new seat) | | | | |

=== Rhos (one seat) ===
Rhos 1995
| Party | Candidate | Votes | % | ±% |
|---|---|---|---|---|
| Labour | Paul Thomas | unopposed | | |
| Labour win (new seat) | | | | |

=== Sandfields East (three seats) ===
Sandfields East 1995
| Party | Candidate | Votes | % | ±% |
|---|---|---|---|---|
| Labour | Noel Crowley | 1,840 | | |
| Labour | Colin Crowley | 1,809 | | |
| Labour | Hilda Mears | 1,800 | | |
| World's Greatest Lover | Captain Beany | 262 | | |
| Turnout | | | | |
| Labour win (new seat) | | | | |
| Labour win (new seat) | | | | |
| Labour win (new seat) | | | | |

=== Sandfields West (three seats) ===
Sandfields West 1995
| Party | Candidate | Votes | % | ±% |
|---|---|---|---|---|
| Labour | Olga Jones | 1,461 | | |
| Labour | Eric Goodger | 1,413 | | |
| Labour | William Harris | 1,405 | | |
| Plaid Cymru | Kelvin Edwards | 535 | | |
| Turnout | | | | |
| Labour win (new seat) | | | | |
| Labour win (new seat) | | | | |
| Labour win (new seat) | | | | |

=== Seven Sisters (one seat) ===
Seven Sisters 1995
| Party | Candidate | Votes | % | ±% |
|---|---|---|---|---|
| Labour | Peter Lloyd | 765 | | |
| Independent | Stuart Jones | 290 | | |
| Plaid Cymru | Alison Holloway | 72 | | |
| Majority | | | | |
| Turnout | | | | |
| Labour win (new seat) | | | | |

=== Taibach (two seats) ===
Taibach 1995
| Party | Candidate | Votes | % | ±% |
|---|---|---|---|---|
| Labour | Clive Owen | unopposed | | |
| Labour | John Rogers | unopposed | | |
| Labour win (new seat) | | | | |
| Labour win (new seat) | | | | |

=== Tonna (one seat) ===
Tonna 1995
| Party | Candidate | Votes | % | ±% |
|---|---|---|---|---|
| Independent | Ronald Boulden | 602 | | |
| Labour | Doreen Jones | 364 | | |
| Majority | | | | |
| Turnout | | | | |
| Independent win (new seat) | | | | |

=== Trebanos (one seat) ===
Trebanos 1995
| Party | Candidate | Votes | % | ±% |
|---|---|---|---|---|
| Labour | Dan Young | 334 | | |
| Plaid Cymru | Walter Conibeer | 204 | | |
| Majority | | | | |
| Turnout | | | | |
| Labour win (new seat) | | | | |

=== Ystalyfera (one seat) ===
Ystalyfera 1995
| Party | Candidate | Votes | % | ±% |
|---|---|---|---|---|
| Plaid Cymru | Alun Llywelyn | 901 | | |
| Labour | Jackie Myers | 647 | | |
| Majority | | | | |
| Turnout | | | | |
| Plaid Cymru win (new seat) | | | | |
