= 2008 Neath Port Talbot County Borough Council election =

2008 Welsh local government election

Results of the 2008 Neath Port Talbot County Borough Council election

The fourth election to Neath Port Talbot County Borough Council was held on 1 May 2008. It was preceded by the 2004 election and followed by the 2012 election. On the same day there were elections to the other 21 local authorities in Wales and community councils in Wales.

== Overview ==
All council seats were up for election. These were the fourth elections held following local government reorganisation. Labour retained its majority.

Neath and Port Talbot County Borough Council election result 2008
Party	Seats	Gains	Losses	Net gain/loss	Seats %	Votes %	Votes	+/−
Labour								
Conservative								
Liberal Democrats								
Plaid Cymru								
	5							
SDP	2							
Green	0							

== Candidates ==
The number of candidates increased compared with 1999.

== Results by ward ==
=== Aberavon (three seats) ===
Aberavon 2008
Party	Candidate	Votes	%	±%
SDP	Anthony Taylor*	893		
SDP	Jeffrey Dinham*	755		
SDP	Thomas John Sullivan*	730		
Labour	Arthur James Howells	389		
Labour	John Edward Sparks	376		
Labour	Barbara Trahar	331		
Turnout		1,629	39.2	
SDP hold		Swing		
SDP hold		Swing		
SDP hold		Swing		

=== Aberdulais (one seat) ===
Aberdulais 2008
Party	Candidate	Votes	%	±%
Labour	Doreen Jones	457		
Plaid Cymru	Lindy Ware	408		
Majority		49		
Turnout		871	48.8	
Labour hold		Swing		

=== Alltwen (one seat) ===
Alltwen 2008
Party	Candidate	Votes	%	±%
Labour	David Lewis*	441		
Plaid Cymru	Huw Evans	328		
Majority				
Turnout		781	43.8	+0.1
Labour hold		Swing		

=== Baglan (three seats) ===
Councillors Hopkins and Richards had been elected as Ratepayers in 2004.

Baglan 2008
Party	Candidate	Votes	%	±%
Labour	Juliet Hopkins*	unopposed		
Labour	Peter Denis Richards*	unopposed		
Ratepayers	John Cardy Tallamy	unopposed		
Labour gain from		Swing		
Labour gain from		Swing		
Ratepayers hold		Swing		

=== Blaengwrach (one seat) ===
Blaengwrach 2008
Party	Candidate	Votes	%	±%
Labour	Alf Siddley	432		
Plaid Cymru	Carolyn Edwards*	380		
Majority		52		
Turnout		817	51.6	
Labour gain from Plaid Cymru		Swing		

=== Briton Ferry East (one seat) ===
Briton Ferry East 2008
Party	Candidate	Votes	%	±%
Labour	Colin Morgan*	558		
Conservative	Anthony Vallario	266		
Majority				
Turnout		837	34.8	
Labour hold		Swing		

=== Briton Ferry West (one seat) ===
Briton Ferry West 2008
Party	Candidate	Votes	%	±%
Labour	Hugh Newton James*	698		
Conservative	Dick Riddle	116		
Majority		582		
Turnout		821	36.6	
Labour hold		Swing		

=== Bryn and Cwmavon (three seats) ===
Bryn and Cwmavon 2008
Party	Candidate	Votes	%	±%
Labour	Ivor David Williams*	1,162		
Labour	Marian Aerona Lewis*	993		
Independent	Brinley Roblin*	959		
Independent	Allan James Bevan	888		
Labour	Allan Louis Jones	796		
Ratepayers	Dave Shepherd	664		
Turnout		2,268	44.0	+1.0
Labour hold		Swing		
Labour hold		Swing		
Independent hold		Swing		

=== Bryncoch North (one seat) ===
Bryncoch North 2008
Party	Candidate	Votes	%	±%
Plaid Cymru	John Raymond Bryant*	560		
Labour	Richard David Mathews	422		
Majority				
Turnout		994	53.6.	+1.3
Plaid Cymru hold		Swing		

=== Bryncoch South (two seats) ===
Bryncoch South 2008
Party	Candidate	Votes	%	±%
Plaid Cymru	Janice Dudley*	1,024		
Plaid Cymru	Tony Wyn-Jones	841		
Labour	Mike Richards	820		
Labour	Cheryl Thomas	660		
Turnout		1,817	40.6	+0.5
Plaid Cymru hold		Swing		
Plaid Cymru hold		Swing		

=== Cadoxton (one seat) ===
Cadoxton 2008
Party	Candidate	Votes	%	±%
Liberal Democrats	Frank Harvey Little	343		
Labour	Maureen Funning	251		
Majority				
Turnout		604	43.1	−1.8
Liberal Democrats gain from Labour		Swing		

=== Cimla (two seats) ===
Cimla 2008
Party	Candidate	Votes	%	±%
Liberal Democrats	John Warman*	1,017		
Liberal Democrats	Desmond James Sparkes	614		
Labour	Brian Warlow	400		
Labour	Stephen Richard Williams*	350		
Turnout		1,331	40.5	+1.3
Liberal Democrats hold		Swing		
Liberal Democrats gain from Labour		Swing		

=== Coedffranc Central (two seats) ===
Coedffranc Central 2008
Party	Candidate	Votes	%	±%
Labour	Arthur Pendry Hodge Davies*	531		
Independent	Betsan Richards	419		
Labour	Paula Bebell	272		
Plaid Cymru	Alyson Jayne Thomas	270		
Ratepayers	Lee Clifford Saunders	238		
Plaid Cymru	Jen Dafis	205		
Turnout		1,167	38.0	−0.9
Labour hold		Swing		
Independent gain from Labour		Swing		

=== Coedffranc North (one seat) ===
Coedffranc North 2008
Party	Candidate	Votes	%	±%
Liberal Democrats	David Keith Davies*	517		
Independent	Janet Sarah Jones	231		
Majority				
Turnout		755	41.0	−2.3
Liberal Democrats hold		Swing		

=== Coedffranc West (one seat) ===
Coedffranc West 2008
Party	Candidate	Votes	%	±%
Labour	Henry Marney Bebell*	419		
Independent	Robert Hay	236		
Conservative	Sarah Louise Baker	134		
Majority				
Turnout		791	41.7	−1.3
Labour hold		Swing		

=== Crynant (one seat) ===
Crynant 2008
Party	Candidate	Votes	%	±%
Plaid Cymru	William Edward Morgan*	494		
Labour	Peter Richards	305		
Majority		189		
Turnout		800	51.7	+3.3
Plaid Cymru hold		Swing		

=== Cwmllynfell (one seat) ===
Cwmllynfell 2008
Party	Candidate	Votes	%	±%
Labour	Clifford Eirion Richards*	unopposed		
Labour hold		Swing		

=== Cymmer (one seat) ===
Cymmer 2008
Party	Candidate	Votes	%	±%
Labour	Scott Jones	594		
Ratepayers	David Lee Williams*	463		
Majority		131		
Turnout		1,062	48.2	
Labour gain from		Swing		

=== Dyffryn (one seat) ===
Dyffryn 2008
Party	Candidate	Votes	%	±%
Plaid Cymru	David Martyn Peters*	958		
Independent	Stephen Absalom	302		
Majority		656		
Turnout		1,265	49.2	
Plaid Cymru hold		Swing		

=== Glyncorrwg (one seat) ===
Glyncorrwg 2008
Party	Candidate	Votes	%	±%
Labour	Horace Glyndwr Rawlins*	312		
Ratepayers	Lindsay Milsom	187		
Majority		125		
Turnout		500	56.8	+0.3
Labour hold		Swing		

=== Glynneath (two seats) ===
Glynneath 2008
Party	Candidate	Votes	%	±%
Plaid Cymru	John Delwyn Morgan*	740		
Plaid Cymru	Horace Thomas Lewis*	668		
Labour	Eifion Rhys Jenkins	594		
Labour	Eddie Jones	495		
Turnout		1,337	48.5	+0.8
Plaid Cymru hold		Swing		
Plaid Cymru hold		Swing		

=== Godre'r Graig (one seat) ===
Godre'rgraig 2008
Party	Candidate	Votes	%	±%
Plaid Cymru	Rosalyn Davies	273		
Labour	Jackie Myers*	269		
Majority		4		
Turnout		551	45.4	
Plaid Cymru gain from Labour		Swing		

=== Gwaun Cae Gurwen (one seat) ===
Gwaun Cae Gurwen 2008
Party	Candidate	Votes	%	±%
Labour	Lynda Ghislaine Williams*	550		
Plaid Cymru	D.Gerald James	308		
Majority		147		
Turnout		872	37.5	−8.5
Labour hold		Swing		

=== Gwynfi (one seat) ===
Gwynfi 2008
Party	Candidate	Votes	%	±%
Independent	Jane Jones*	390		
Labour	Colin Robert Day	288		
Majority		102		
Turnout		680	63.4	−4.4
Independent hold		Swing		

=== Lower Brynamman (one seat) ===
Lower Brynamman 2008
Party	Candidate	Votes	%	±%
Labour	Arwyn Nigel Woolcock*	unopposed		
Labour hold		Swing		

=== Margam (one seat) ===
Margam 2008
Party	Candidate	Votes	%	±%
Labour	Stanley John Mason	544		
Ratepayers	Leslie John Davies*	480		
Majority		64		
Turnout		1,035	45.5	+3.2
Labour gain from		Swing		

=== Neath East (three seats) ===
Neath East 2008
Party	Candidate	Votes	%	±%
Labour	Sheila Marlene Penry*	798		
Labour	John Miller*	718		
Labour	Sandra Miller*	718		
Plaid Cymru	Philippa Jane Edwards	696		
Plaid Cymru	Breandan Seosamh Dominic Mac Cathail	654		
Turnout		1,615	32.8	−2.1
Labour hold		Swing		
Labour hold		Swing		
Labour hold		Swing		

=== Neath North (two seats) ===
Neath North 2008
Party	Candidate	Votes	%	±%
Labour	Derek Vaughan*	995		
Labour	Emmanuel Loaring*	788		
Independent	Tony Phillips	596		
Turnout		1,417	43.9	−3.5
Labour hold		Swing		
Labour hold		Swing		

=== Neath South (two seats) ===
Neath South 2008
Party	Candidate	Votes	%	±%
Labour	Peter Albert Rees*	700		
Labour	Malcolm Bernard Gunter*	663		
Ratepayers	John Williams	469		
Ratepayers	David Wyn Howells	441		
Turnout		1,248	34.2	+0.2
Labour hold		Swing		
Labour hold		Swing		

=== Onllwyn (one seat) ===
Onllwyn 2008
Party	Candidate	Votes	%	±%
Labour	Alan Huw Thomas*	341		
Plaid Cymru	Marion Louise Morgan	166		
Majority				
Turnout		508	52.1	+1.0
Labour hold		Swing		

=== Pelenna (one seat) ===
Pelenna 2008
Party	Candidate	Votes	%	±%
Labour	Lance Whiteley	279		
Liberal Democrats	Annette Sparkes	170		
Majority		109		
Turnout		455	49.0	
Labour hold		Swing		

=== Pontardawe (two seats) ===
Pontardawe 2008
Party	Candidate	Votes	%	±%
Labour	Michael Lloyd James*	819		
Plaid Cymru	Linet Purcell	718		
Plaid Cymru	Robert Lewis Williams	705		
Labour	Martha Christina Mary Lambourne	666		
Turnout		1,073	26.5	−13.6
Labour hold		Swing		
Plaid Cymru hold		Swing		

=== Port Talbot (three seats) ===
Port Talbot 2008
Party	Candidate	Votes	%	±%
Ratepayers	Andrew James Tutton*	805		
Ratepayers	Dennis Keogh*	762		
Labour	Ian Ben James	715		
Labour	Dawn Sawyers	704		
Ratepayers	Scott John Sullivan	689		
Labour	Christopher Mainwaring	681		
Turnout		1,689	38.0	
		Swing		
		Swing		
Labour gain from		Swing		

=== Resolven (one seat) ===
Resolven 2008
Party	Candidate	Votes	%	±%
Labour	Desmond William Davies*	611		
Plaid Cymru	David Trefor Jones	469		
Majority				
Turnout		1,089	44.0	+1.5
Labour hold		Swing		

=== Rhos (one seat) ===
Rhos 2008
Party	Candidate	Votes	%	±%
Plaid Cymru	Marcia Spooner	578		
Labour	Paul Michael Thomas*	346		
Majority		232		
Turnout		930	44.7	
Plaid Cymru gain from Labour		Swing		

=== Sandfields East (three seats) ===
Sandfields East 2008
Party	Candidate	Votes	%	±%
Independent	Leila Helen James*	1,251		
Labour	Colin Joseph Crowley*	921		
Labour	Edward Victor Latham	912		
Labour	Patricia Irene Jones	609		
Ratepayers	Clive Davies	520		
Ratepayers	Brian Morris	472		
New Millennium Bean Party	Captain Beany	369		
Turnout		2,174	41.6	−2.6
Independent hold		Swing		
Labour hold		Swing		
Labour hold		Swing		

=== Sandfields West (three seats) ===
Sandfields West 2008
Party	Candidate	Votes	%	±%
Labour	Olga Jones*	964		
Labour	Patricia Jane Thomas*	904		
Labour	Leonard William Willis	790		
Ratepayers	Ollie Davies	696		
Ratepayers	Wayne David Hughes	653		
Ratepayers	Dean Williams	441		
SDP	Wayne Morris	400		
Turnout		1,853	36.2	+0.1
Labour hold		Swing		
Labour hold		Swing		
Labour hold		Swing		

=== Seven Sisters (one seat) ===
Seven Sisters 2008
Party	Candidate	Votes	%	±%
Independent	Stephen Karl Hunt	599		
Labour	Peter Gary Lloyd*	362		
Majority		237		
Turnout		966	57.3	+12.2
Independent gain from Labour		Swing		

=== Taibach (two seats) ===
Taibach 2008
Party	Candidate	Votes	%	±%
Labour	John Rogers*	1,040		
Labour	Anthony Taylor	699		
Ratepayers	Aneurin Simon Lewis*	594		
Independent	John Brian Hughes	483		
Ratepayers	Erica Tutton	332		
Turnout		1,786	46.5	+2.9
Labour hold		Swing		
Labour gain from		Swing		

=== Tonna (one seat) ===
Tonna 2008
Party	Candidate	Votes	%	±%
Independent	William David Walters*	616		
Labour	Kelvin Thomas George	190		
Majority		426		
Turnout		814	42.5	−3.8
Independent hold		Swing		

=== Trebanos (one seat) ===
Trebanos 2008
Party	Candidate	Votes	%	±%
Labour	Andrea Paula Davies	255		
Liberal Democrats	Sheila Waye	183		
Majority		72		
Turnout		440	40.5	−0.9
Labour hold		Swing		

=== Ystalyfera (one seat) ===
Ystalyfera 2008
Party	Candidate	Votes	%	±%
Plaid Cymru	Alun Llywelyn*	749		
Labour	Noir James	388		
Majority				
Turnout		1,154	49.1	+3.7
Plaid Cymru hold		Swing		
