= 1999 Neath Port Talbot County Borough Council election =

Local authority election in Wales

The second election to Neath Port Talbot County Borough Council was held on 6 May 1999. It was preceded by the 1995 election and followed by the 2004 election. On the same day there were elections to the other 21 local authorities in Wales and community councils in Wales.

== Overview ==
All council seats were up for election. These were the second elections held following local government reorganisation.

Neath and Port Talbot County Borough Council election result 1999
Party	Seats	Gains	Losses	Net gain/loss	Seats %	Votes %	Votes	+/−
Labour								
Conservative							293	
Liberal Democrats								
Plaid Cymru								
Other parties	5							
SDP	2							

== Candidates ==
Most sitting members of West Glamorgan County council sought election to the new authority. A number were also members of the previous district councils but others contested a ward against a sitting district councillor.

== Results by ward ==
=== Aberavon (three seats) ===
Aberavon 1999
Party	Candidate	Votes	%	±%
SDP	Anthony Taylor*	1,191		
SDP	Jeffrey Dinham	973		
SDP	Thomas John Sullivan	852		
Labour	Andrew Brian Jones*	640		
Labour	Kenneth John Price	635		
Labour	John Malcolm Slater	616		
Turnout				
SDP hold		Swing		
SDP gain from Labour		Swing		
SDP gain from Labour		Swing		

=== Aberdulais (one seat) ===
Aberdulais 1999
Party	Candidate	Votes	%	±%
Labour	Elwyn Jones*	unopposed		
Labour hold		Swing		

=== Alltwen (one seat) ===
Alltwen 1999
Party	Candidate	Votes	%	±%
Labour	David Lewis*	unopposed		
Labour hold		Swing		

=== Baglan (three seats) ===
Baglan 1999
Party	Candidate	Votes	%	±%
Ratepayers	Arthur Edward Wheatley*	1,358		
Labour	Malcolm David Harris*	1,292		
Ratepayers	Paul Ernest Evans	1,219		
Ratepayers	Elwyn John Tyrell	1,120		
Labour	Marian Aerona Golding	1,100		
Labour	Leslie Rees	1,047		
Conservative	Wayne Morris	293		
Turnout				
Other parties hold		Swing		
Labour hold		Swing		
Other parties hold		Swing		

=== Blaengwrach (one seat) ===
Blaengwrach 1999
Party	Candidate	Votes	%	±%
Plaid Cymru	Carolyn Edwards	397		
Labour	David Michael Hughes*	369		
Majority		28		
Turnout				
Plaid Cymru gain from Labour		Swing		

=== Briton Ferry East (one seat) ===
Briton Ferry East 1999
Party	Candidate	Votes	%	±%
Labour	Colin Morgan*	674		
Liberal Democrats	Ian David Sherwood	375		
Majority				
Turnout				
Labour hold		Swing		

=== Briton Ferry West (one seat) ===
Briton Ferry West 1999
Party	Candidate	Votes	%	±%
Labour	Stanley Atherton	659		
Liberal Democrats	Gary Lewis	255		
Majority				
Turnout				
Labour hold		Swing		

=== Bryn and Cwmavon (three seats) ===
Bryn and Cwmavon 1999
Party	Candidate	Votes	%	±%
Labour	Gaynor Elizabeth Williams*	1,028		
Labour	Thomas David Morgans*	948		
Independent Labour	Thomas D. Mel John*	884		
Liberal Democrats	Marilyn Harris	874		
Labour	Elizabeth Williams	809		
Independent	Brinley Roblin	734		
Liberal Democrats	Terence John Rogers	607		
Ratepayers and Tenants	Paul Parry	495		
Turnout				
Labour hold		Swing		
Labour hold		Swing		
Independent Labour gain from Labour		Swing		

=== Bryncoch North (one seat) ===
Bryncoch North 1995
Party	Candidate	Votes	%	±%
Labour	Richard David Matthews	531		
Plaid Cymru	David Wyn Thomas	321		
Liberal Democrats	Thomas R. Parkinson	155		
Majority		210		
Turnout				
Labour hold		Swing		

=== Bryncoch South (two seats) ===
Bryncoch South 1999
Party	Candidate	Votes	%	±%
Plaid Cymru	Gareth Ifan Richards	983		
Labour	Patricia Margaret Phillips	902		
Labour	Kenneth Carl Palmer*	863		
Turnout				
Plaid Cymru gain from Labour		Swing		
Labour hold		Swing		

=== Cadoxton (one seat) ===
Cadoxton 1999
Party	Candidate	Votes	%	±%
Labour	David Valdo Funning	331		
Plaid Cymru	Robert Joseph King	261		
Majority		70		
Turnout				
Labour hold		Swing		

=== Cimla (two seats) ===
Cimla 1999
Party	Candidate	Votes	%	±%
Liberal Democrats	John Warman*	893		
Labour	Reginald Valentine Teale*	804		
Labour	David George Williams	475		
Turnout				
Liberal Democrats hold		Swing		
Labour hold		Swing		

=== Coedffranc Central (two seats) ===
Former Communist Glaslyn Morgan was elected as Democratic Left candidate in 1995 but subsequently joined Plaid Cymru.

Coedffranc Central 1999
Party	Candidate	Votes	%	±%
Plaid Cymru	Glaslyn Morgan*	701		
Independent	Betsan Powell*	663		
Labour	Arthur Pendry Hodge Davies	529		
Labour	David Reginald Davies	440		
Independent Labour	Maureen Bond	271		
Turnout				
Plaid Cymru hold		Swing		
Independent hold		Swing		

=== Coedffranc North (one seat) ===
Coedffranc North 1999
Party	Candidate	Votes	%	±%
Liberal Democrats	David Keith Davies*	434		
Labour	Darren Jones	382		
Majority		52		
Turnout				
Liberal Democrats hold		Swing		

=== Coedffranc West (one seat) ===
Coedffranc West 1999
Party	Candidate	Votes	%	±%
Labour	Henry Marney Bebell	314		
Plaid Cymru	Huw John Jenkins Phillips	249		
Liberal Democrats	Robert Charles Lloyd	141		
Majority				
Turnout				
Labour win (new seat)				

=== Crynant (one seat) ===
Crynant 1999
Party	Candidate	Votes	%	±%
Labour	Albert D. Lyn Harper*	unopposed		
Labour hold		Swing		

=== Cwmllynfell (one seat) ===
Cwmllynfell 1999
Party	Candidate	Votes	%	±%
Labour	Idwal Griffiths*	unopposed		
Labour hold		Swing		

=== Cymmer (one seat) ===
Cymmer 1999
Party	Candidate	Votes	%	±%
Independent	Mairwen Goodridge	623		
Labour	David Thomas Stokes*	511		
Majority		112		
Turnout				
Independent gain from Labour		Swing		

=== Dyffryn (one seat) ===
Plaid Cymru won the seat in 1995 but lost it at a subsequent by-election.

Dyffryn 1999
Party	Candidate	Votes	%	±%
Plaid Cymru	David Martyn Peters	746		
Labour	Norman Richard Thomas*	432		
Majority				
Turnout				
Plaid Cymru gain from Labour		Swing		

=== Glyncorrwg (one seat) ===
Glyncorrwg 1999
Party	Candidate	Votes	%	±%
Labour	Horace Glyn Rawlins	unopposed		
Labour hold		Swing		

=== Glynneath (two seats) ===
Glynneath 1999
Party	Candidate	Votes	%	±%
Plaid Cymru	John Delwyn Morgan*	987		
Plaid Cymru	Horace Thomas Lewis	716		
Labour	David Morgan Williams*	653		
Labour	Jacqueline Joseph	460		
Turnout				
Plaid Cymru hold		Swing		
Plaid Cymru gain from Labour		Swing		

=== Godre'r Graig (one seat) ===
Godre'rgraig 1999
Party	Candidate	Votes	%	±%
Labour	Jackie Myers	312		
Plaid Cymru	Rosalyn Davies	262		
Majority		50		
Turnout				
Labour hold		Swing		

=== Gwaun Cae Gurwen (one seat) ===
Gwaun Cae Gurwen 1999
Party	Candidate	Votes	%	±%
Plaid Cymru	Catrin Bevan	731		
Labour	Guy Silvanus Jones	445		
Independent	David Gerald Oswald Jones	87		
Majority				
Turnout				
Plaid Cymru gain from Labour		Swing		

=== Gwynfi (one seat) ===
Gwynfi 1999
Party	Candidate	Votes	%	±%
Labour	Colin Robert Day	446		
Independent Labour	David Henry Evans*	392		
Majority				
Turnout				
Labour gain from Independent Labour		Swing		

=== Lower Brynamman (one seat) ===
Lower Brynamman 1999
Party	Candidate	Votes	%	±%
Labour	Arwyn N. Woolcock*	unopposed		
Labour hold		Swing		

=== Margam (one seat) ===
Margam 1999
Party	Candidate	Votes	%	±%
Labour	Stanley John Mason*	378		
Official Ratepayer and Tenants	Terrence James Ward	197		
Liberal Democrats	Robert Tudor Jones	195		
Majority				
Turnout				
Labour hold		Swing		

=== Neath East (three seats) ===
Neath East 1999
Party	Candidate	Votes	%	±%
Labour	Sandra Miller	1,022		
Labour	Sheila Marlene Penry	1,003		
Labour	Charles Edward Henrywood*	738		
Plaid Cymru	Brendan S.D. MacMathail	590		
Liberal Democrats	Richard John Moth	402		
Turnout				
Labour hold		Swing		
Labour hold		Swing		
Labour hold		Swing		

=== Neath North (two seats) ===
Clive Thomas had captured a seat from Labour at a by-election.

Neath North 1999
Party	Candidate	Votes	%	±%
Labour	Derek Vaughan*	1,114		
Labour	Emmanuel Loaring	738		
Independent Labour	Clive Henry Thomas*	690		
Independent Labour	Thomas Anthony Phillips	456		
Turnout				
Labour hold		Swing		
Labour gain from Independent Labour		Swing		

=== Neath South (two seats) ===
Neath South 1999
Party	Candidate	Votes	%	±%
Labour	Malcolm B. Gunter*	unopposed		
Labour	Peter Albert Rees*	unopposed		
Labour hold		Swing		
Labour hold		Swing		

=== Onllwyn (one seat) ===
Onllwyn 1999
Party	Candidate	Votes	%	±%
Labour	Alan Huw Thomas*	378		
Liberal Democrats	David Rees Davies	215		
Majority				
Turnout				
Labour hold		Swing		

=== Pelenna (one seat) ===
Pelenna 1999
Party	Candidate	Votes	%	±%
Labour	Malcolm Isaac Jones*	unopposed		
Labour hold		Swing		

=== Pontardawe (two seats) ===
Pontardawe 1999
Party	Candidate	Votes	%	±%
Plaid Cymru	Dewi Richard Evans	895		
Plaid Cymru	Robert Lewis Williams	647		
Labour	Michael Lloyd-James	623		
Labour	John Paul Jenkins	617		
Independent	Huw Llewelyn Williams	499		
Turnout				
Plaid Cymru gain from Labour		Swing		
Plaid Cymru gain from Labour		Swing		

=== Port Talbot (three seats) ===
Port Talbot 1999
Party	Candidate	Votes	%	±%
Ratepayers and Tenants	Pamela Edith Spender*	1,056		
Ratepayers and Tenants	Sylvan Rees Thomas	977		
Ratepayers and Tenants	Andrew James Tutton	709		
Labour	Christopher Mainwaring	604		
Labour	Steffan ap Dafydd	574		
Labour	Jennifer M. Braemar-Blood*	518		
Independent	Ann Marie Thomas	490		
Plaid Cymru	Stanley George Davies	429		
Turnout				
Others hold		Swing		
Others gain from Labour				
Others gain from Labour				

=== Resolven (one seat) ===
Resolven 1999
Party	Candidate	Votes	%	±%
Labour	Desmond William Davies	850		
Plaid Cymru	Conway Gillard	411		
Majority				
Turnout				
Labour hold		Swing		

=== Rhos (one seat) ===
Rhos 1995
Party	Candidate	Votes	%	±%
Labour	Paul Michael Thomas	543		
Liberal Democrats	Frank Little	450		
Majority				
Turnout				
Labour hold		Swing		

=== Sandfields East (three seats) ===
Sandfields East 1999
Party	Candidate	Votes	%	±%
Independent	Leila Helen James	1,252		
Labour	Thomas P. Noel Crowley*	1,170		
Labour	Colin Joseph Crowley*	1,147		
Labour	Patricia Irene Jones	806		
Ratepayer and Tenants	Leigh Davies	736		
Ratepayer	Raymond T. Pursey	598		
Liberal Democrats	Thomas Leslie Hunt	572		
Turnout				
Independent gain from Labour		Swing		
Labour hold		Swing		
Labour hold		Swing		

=== Sandfields West (three seats) ===
Patricia Jane Thomas had held the seat in a by-election since 1995.

Sandfields West 1999
Party	Candidate	Votes	%	±%
Labour	Olga Jones*	1,235		
Labour	Patricia Jane Thomas*	1,173		
Labour	William John Harris*	1,128		
Ratepayer and Tenants	Stephen Griffiths	950		
Plaid Cymru	Kelvin Peter Edwards	824		
Turnout				
Labour hold		Swing		
Labour hold		Swing		
Labour hold		Swing		

=== Seven Sisters (one seat) ===
Seven Sisters 1999
Party	Candidate	Votes	%	±%
Labour	Peter Gary Lloyd*	603		
Independent	Stuart Lloyd Jones	249		
Majority				
Turnout				
Labour hold		Swing		

=== Taibach (two seats) ===
Taibach 1999
Party	Candidate	Votes	%	±%
Labour	John Rogers*	1,220		
Labour	Clive Owen*	1,121		
Ratepayer and Tenants	Scott J. Sullivan	639		
Ratepayer and Tenants	John D. Sullivan	548		
Turnout				
Labour hold		Swing		
Labour hold		Swing		

=== Tonna (one seat) ===
Tonna 1999
Party	Candidate	Votes	%	±%
Labour	John Neville Miles	639		
Plaid Cymru	Heath Joy Evans	288		
Majority				
Turnout				
Labour gain from Independent		Swing		

=== Trebanos (one seat) ===
Trebanos 1999
Party	Candidate	Votes	%	±%
Labour	Joseph Denzil Edwards	412		
Liberal Democrats	Alexander Eric Tyrrell	91		
Majority				
Turnout				
Labour hold		Swing		

=== Ystalyfera (one seat) ===
Ystalyfera 1999
Party	Candidate	Votes	%	±%
Plaid Cymru	Alun Llywelyn	997		
Labour	Ifan Huw Irranca-Davies	487		
Majority				
Turnout				
Plaid Cymru hold		Swing		
