= 2012 Neath Port Talbot County Borough Council election =

2012 Welsh local government election

Results of the 2012 Neath Port Talbot County Borough Council election

The fifth election to Neath Port Talbot County Borough Council was held on 3 May 2012. It was preceded by the 2008 election and was followed by the 2017 election. On the same day there were elections to the other 21 local authorities in Wales and community councils in Wales.

== Overview ==
All council seats were up for election. These were the fifth elections held following local government reorganisation. Labour retained its majority. There was a significant fall in the turnout in many wards and this appears to have worked to Labour's advantage in several instances.

Neath and Port Talbot County Borough Council election result 2012
Party	Seats	Gains	Losses	Net gain/loss	Seats %	Votes %	Votes	+/−
Labour	52			+15	81.3	51.7	21,672	+6.8
Plaid Cymru	8			-3	12.5	20.5	8,630	+0.3
Neath Port Talbot Independents	0			-3	0.0	11.6	4,870	+0.2
Independent	3			-3	4.7	9.5	4,006	-4.0
Liberal Democrats	0			-4	0.0	2.5	1,057	-2.5
SDP	1			-2	1.6	2.5	1,050	-0.4
Conservative	0			0	0.0	1.6	669	+0.5
New Millennium Bean Party	-	-	-	-	-	-	-	-0.8

== Candidates ==
The number of candidates increased compared with 1999.

== Results by ward ==
=== Aberavon (three seats) ===
Aberavon 2012
Party	Candidate	Votes	%	±%
Labour	Ceri Golding	751		
Labour	Mark Jones	740		
SDP	Anthony Taylor*	702		
Labour	Barbara Trahar	613		
SDP	Thomas John Sullivan*	556		
SDP	Jeffrey Dinham*	550		
Plaid Cymru	Paul Nicholls-Jones	185		
Turnout		1,511	35.8	−3.4
Labour gain from SDP		Swing		
Labour gain from SDP		Swing		
SDP hold		Swing		

=== Aberdulais (one seat) ===
Aberdulais 2012
Party	Candidate	Votes	%	±%
Labour	Doreen Jones*	431		
Plaid Cymru	Ken Thomas	290		
Majority		141		
Turnout		728	40.8	−8.0
Labour hold		Swing		

=== Alltwen (one seat) ===
Alltwen 2012
Party	Candidate	Votes	%	±%
Labour	David Lewis*	463		
Plaid Cymru	Huw Evans	210		
Majority				
Turnout		679	35.9	−7.9
Labour hold		Swing		

=== Baglan (three seats) ===
Tallamy was elected as a Ratepayer in 2008

Baglan 2012
Party	Candidate	Votes	%	±%
Labour	Peter Denis Richards*	1,190		
Labour	Carol Clement	1,038		
Labour	Paul Greenaway	906		
Independent	David Keith Coslett	881		
Independent	John Cardy Tallamy*	862		
Independent	Mike Lewis	861		
Conservative	T.J. Morgan	186		
Turnout		2,218	40.4	
Labour hold		Swing		
Labour hold		Swing		
Labour gain from		Swing		

=== Blaengwrach (one seat) ===
Blaengwrach 2012
Party	Candidate	Votes	%	±%
Labour	Alf Siddley*	363		
Plaid Cymru	Joan Bodman	290		
Majority		73		
Turnout		654	42.3	−9.3
Labour gain from Plaid Cymru		Swing		

=== Briton Ferry East (one seat) ===
Briton Ferry East 2012
Party	Candidate	Votes	%	±%
Labour	Colin Morgan*	unopposed		
Labour hold		Swing		

=== Briton Ferry West (one seat) ===
Briton Ferry West 2012
Party	Candidate	Votes	%	±%
Labour	Hugh Newton James*	unopposed		
Labour hold		Swing		

=== Bryn and Cwmavon (three seats) ===
Bryn and Cwmavon 2012
Party	Candidate	Votes	%	±%
Labour	Ivor David Williams*	1,321		
Labour	Marian Aerona Lewis*	1,168		
Labour	Dave Whitelock	987		
Independent	Brinley Roblin*	631		
Independent	Vincent Gwynfor Williams	500		
Independent	David James Shepherd	358		
Turnout		1,995	38.6	−5.4
Labour hold		Swing		
Labour hold		Swing		
Labour gain from Independent		Swing		

=== Bryncoch North (one seat) ===
Bryncoch North 2012
Party	Candidate	Votes	%	±%
Plaid Cymru	John Raymond Bryant*	677		
Labour	Sion Griffiths	178		
Majority				
Turnout		858	45.8	−7.8
Plaid Cymru hold		Swing		

=== Bryncoch South (two seats) ===
Bryncoch South 2012
Party	Candidate	Votes	%	±%
Labour	Rob James	856		
Plaid Cymru	Janice Dudley*	825		
Plaid Cymru	Tony Wyn-Jones*	744		
Labour	Andrew Jenkins	703		
Turnout		1,721	37.3	−3.3
Labour gain from Plaid Cymru		Swing		
Plaid Cymru hold		Swing		

=== Cadoxton (one seat) ===
Cadoxton 2012
Party	Candidate	Votes	%	±%
Labour	Annette Wingrave	296		
Liberal Democrats	Frank Harvey Little*	185		
Majority		111		
Turnout		494	35.7	−7.4
Labour gain from Liberal Democrats		Swing		

=== Cimla (two seats) ===
John Warman joined Labour since 2008.

Cimla 2012
Party	Candidate	Votes	%	±%
Labour	John Warman*	949		
Labour	Alan Carter	706		
Liberal Democrats	Desmond James Sparkes*	226		
Independent	John Edgar Williams	183		
Turnout		1,194	36.9	−3.6
Labour gain from Liberal Democrats		Swing		
Labour gain from Liberal Democrats		Swing		

=== Coedffranc Central (two seats) ===
Coedffranc Central 2012
Party	Candidate	Votes	%	±%
Labour	Arthur Pendry Hodge Davies*	616		
Labour	Paula Bebell	382		
Independent	Betsan Richards*	297		
Independent	Lee Clifford Saunders	206		
Plaid Cymru	Pauline M. Fellows	125		
Plaid Cymru	Russell G. Morris	90		
Turnout		971	32.5	−5.5
Labour hold		Swing		
Labour gain from Independent		Swing		

=== Coedffranc North (one seat) ===
Coedffranc North 2012
Party	Candidate	Votes	%	±%
Labour	Mike Harvey	451		
Liberal Democrats	David Keith Davies*	268		
Majority				
Turnout		727	39.6	−1.4
Labour gain from Liberal Democrats		Swing		

=== Coedffranc West (one seat) ===
Coedffranc West 2012
Party	Candidate	Votes	%	±%
Labour	Henry Marney Bebell*	406		
Liberal Democrats	Helen Ceri Clarke	317		
Majority				
Turnout		733	34.2	−7.3
Labour hold		Swing		

=== Crynant (one seat) ===
Crynant 2012
Party	Candidate	Votes	%	±%
Labour	Karen Pearson	370		
Plaid Cymru	William Edward Morgan*	280		
Majority		90		
Turnout		651	41.5	−10.2
Labour gain from Plaid Cymru		Swing		

=== Cwmllynfell (one seat) ===
Cwmllynfell 2012
Party	Candidate	Votes	%	±%
Labour	Clifford Eirion Richards*	348		
Plaid Cymru	David Gerald Oswald James	110		
Majority		248		
Turnout		461	49.8	
Labour hold		Swing		

=== Cymmer (one seat) ===
Cymmer 2012
Party	Candidate	Votes	%	±%
Labour	Scott Jones*	unopposed		
Labour hold		Swing		

=== Dyffryn (one seat) ===
Dyffryn 2012
Party	Candidate	Votes	%	±%
Plaid Cymru	David Martyn Peters*	1,000		
Conservative	Peter Damian Jaques	78		
Majority		922		
Turnout		1,093	44.1	−5.1
Plaid Cymru hold		Swing		

=== Glyncorrwg (one seat) ===
Glyncorrwg 2012
Party	Candidate	Votes	%	±%
Labour	Horace Glyndwr Rawlins*	271		
Independent	Lindsay David Milsom	201		
Majority		70		
Turnout		472	56.6	−0.2
Labour hold		Swing		

=== Glynneath (two seats) ===
Glynneath 2012
Party	Candidate	Votes	%	±%
Plaid Cymru	John Delwyn Morgan*	711		
Labour	Eddie Jones	593		
Plaid Cymru	Horace Thomas Lewis*	534		
Labour	Chris Pavett	529		
Turnout		899	33.1	−15.4
Plaid Cymru hold		Swing		
Labour gain from Plaid Cymru		Swing		

=== Godre'r Graig (one seat) ===
Godre'rgraig 2012
Party	Candidate	Votes	%	±%
Plaid Cymru	Rosalyn Davies*	300		
Labour	Jackie Myers	286		
Majority		14		
Turnout		591	43.8	−1.6
Plaid Cymru hold		Swing		

=== Gwaun Cae Gurwen (one seat) ===
Gwaun Cae Gurwen 2012
Party	Candidate	Votes	%	±%
Labour	Lynda Ghislaine Williams*	484		
Plaid Cymru	Ron Williams	352		
Majority		132		
Turnout		843	37.7	+0.2
Labour hold		Swing		

=== Gwynfi (one seat) ===
Gwynfi 2012
Party	Candidate	Votes	%	±%
Labour	Ralph Thomas	502		
Independent	Jane Jones*	153		
Majority				
Turnout		655	63.8	+0.4
Labour gain from Independent		Swing		

=== Lower Brynamman (one seat) ===
Lower Brynamman 2012
Party	Candidate	Votes	%	±%
Labour	Arwyn Nigel Woolcock*	unopposed		
Labour hold		Swing		

=== Margam (one seat) ===
Margam 2012
Party	Candidate	Votes	%	±%
Labour	Robert Jones	402		
Independent	Scott John Sullivan	166		
SDP	George Roy Rideway	129		
Conservative	Caroline Yvonne Jones	110		
Liberal Democrats	Mathew Thomas McCarthy	61		
Majority				
Turnout		868	38.1	−7.4
Labour hold		Swing		

=== Neath East (three seats) ===
Neath East 2012
Party	Candidate	Votes	%	±%
Labour	Sheila Marlene Penry*	905		
Labour	John Miller*	826		
Labour	Sandra Miller*	808		
Plaid Cymru	Breandan Seosamh Dominic Mac Cathail	452		
Plaid Cymru	Gareth Thomas	391		
Plaid Cymru	Philippa Jane Richards	365		
Turnout		1,330	27.2	−5.6
Labour hold		Swing		
Labour hold		Swing		
Labour hold		Swing		

=== Neath North (two seats) ===
Neath North 2012
Party	Candidate	Votes	%	±%
Labour	Alan Richard Lockyer	709		
Labour	Mark Protheroe	628		
Independent	Dai Howells	341		
Conservative	Basil Ip	188		
Turnout		1,082	34.7	−9.2
Labour hold		Swing		
Labour hold		Swing		

=== Neath South (two seats) ===
Neath South 2012
Party	Candidate	Votes	%	±%
Labour	Peter Albert Rees*	718		
Labour	Malcolm Bernard Gunter*	665		
Independent	Helen Christine Morgan	207		
Independent	David Hewitt Morgan	190		
Plaid Cymru	Rob Parry	153		
Plaid Cymru	Chris Williams	146		
Turnout		1,135	31.1	−3.1
Labour hold		Swing		
Labour hold		Swing		

=== Onllwyn (one seat) ===
Onllwyn 2012
Party	Candidate	Votes	%	±%
Labour	Alan Huw Thomas*	328		
Plaid Cymru	Carolyn Edwards	96		
Majority		232		
Turnout		431	45.0	−7.1
Labour hold		Swing		

=== Pelenna (one seat) ===
Pelenna 2012
Party	Candidate	Votes	%	±%
Independent	Martin Ellis	252		
Plaid Cymru	Jeremy Hurley	227		
Labour	Kelvin George	64		
Majority		25		
Turnout		545	60.0	+11.0
Independent gain from Labour		Swing		

=== Pontardawe (two seats) ===
Pontardawe 2012
Party	Candidate	Votes	%	±%
Plaid Cymru	Linet Margaret Purcell*	911		
Labour	Michael Lloyd James*	729		
Plaid Cymru	Sue Northcott	675		
Labour	Vince Hotten	612		
Turnout		1,592	38.6	+12.1
Plaid Cymru hold		Swing		
Labour hold		Swing		

=== Port Talbot (three seats) ===
Keogh and Tutton were elected as Ratepayers in 2008.

Port Talbot 2012
Party	Candidate	Votes	%	±%
Labour	Ian Ben James*	831		
Labour	Dennis Keogh*	782		
Labour	Saifur Rahaman	707		
Independent	Andrew James Tutton*	592		
Independent	Marge Jones	528		
Independent	Stephen Griffiths	479		
Conservative	Keith James Miller	107		
Turnout		1,547	35.0	−3.0
Labour hold		Swing		
Labour gain from		Swing		
Labour gain from		Swing		

=== Resolven (one seat) ===
Resolven 2012
Party	Candidate	Votes	%	±%
Labour	Desmond William Davies*	729		
Plaid Cymru	Helen Williams	278		
Majority				
Turnout		1,021	41.1	−2.9
Labour hold		Swing		

=== Rhos (one seat) ===
Rhos 2012
Party	Candidate	Votes	%	±%
Labour	Alex Thomas	394		
Plaid Cymru	Marcia Spooner*	265		
Independent	David Howell Atkins	223		
Majority		129		
Turnout		883	43.9	−0.8
Labour gain from Plaid Cymru		Swing		

=== Sandfields East (three seats) ===
Sandfields East 2008
Party	Candidate	Votes	%	±%
Independent	Leila Helen James*	1,116		
Labour	Edward Victor Latham	1,041		
Labour	Colin Joseph Crowley*	879		
Labour	Patricia Irene Jones	750		
Independent	Captain Beany	669		
Independent	Len Willis*	622		
Turnout		2,174	40.1	−1.5
Independent hold		Swing		
Labour hold		Swing		
Labour hold		Swing		

=== Sandfields West (three seats) ===
Olga Jones and Len Willis were deselected and stood as Independents (Willis in a neighboring ward).

Sandfields West 2008
Party	Candidate	Votes	%	±%
Labour	Audrey Chaves	1,173		
Labour	James Stephen Evans	1,088		
Labour	Suzanne Paddison	1,078		
Independent	Keith Suter	377		
Independent	Oliver Stewart Davies	368		
Independent	Joan Targett	368		
Independent	Olga Jones*	242		
SDP	Wayne Morris	219		
Turnout		1,853	35.5	−0.7
Labour hold		Swing		
Labour hold		Swing		
Labour hold		Swing		

=== Seven Sisters (one seat) ===
Seven Sisters 2012
Party	Candidate	Votes	%	±%
Independent	Stephen Karl Hunt*	764		
Labour	Jako Davies	240		
Majority		524		
Turnout		966	62.9	+5.6
Independent hold		Swing		

=== Taibach (two seats) ===
Taibach 2012
Party	Candidate	Votes	%	±%
Labour	John Rogers*	1,138		
Labour	Anthony James Taylor*	942		
Independent	Leslie John Davies	494		
Turnout		1,507	39.0	−7.5
Labour hold		Swing		
Labour hold		Swing		

=== Tonna (one seat) ===
Tonna 2012
Party	Candidate	Votes	%	±%
Labour	Cari Morgans	558		
Independent	William David Walters*	328		
Majority		230		
Turnout		894	46.1	+3.6
Labour gain from Independent		Swing		

=== Trebanos (one seat) ===
Trebanos 2012
Party	Candidate	Votes	%	±%
Plaid Cymru	Rebecca Lewis	302		
Labour	Andrea Paula Davies*	166		
Independent	Jonathan Hywel Jones	53		
Majority		72		
Turnout		523	47.5	+7.0
Plaid Cymru gain from Labour		Swing		

=== Ystalyfera (one seat) ===
Ystalyfera 2012
Party	Candidate	Votes	%	±%
Plaid Cymru	Alun Llywelyn*	591		
Labour	Noir James	422		
Majority				
Turnout		1,154	49.1	+3.7
Plaid Cymru hold		Swing		

== By-elections 2012-17 ==
=== Neath South by-election, 2012 ===
A by-election took place in the Neath South ward on 6 December 2012.

Neath South by-election 2012
Party	Candidate	Votes	%	±%
Labour	Andrew Jenkins	399		
Liberal Democrats	Charlotte May Cross	130		
Turnout				
Labour hold		Swing		

=== Sandfields East by-election, 2014 ===
A by-election took place in the Sandfields East ward on 30 October 2014, following the death of Colin Crowley.

Sandfields East by-election 2014
Party	Candidate	Votes	%	±%
Labour	Mike Davies	718		
Port Talbot Residents	Barry Howard Kirk	222		
UKIP	Keith Suter	154		
Plaid Cymru	Daniel Mark Thomas	69		
Conservative	Richard James Minshull	40		
Turnout		1,205	23.3	−16.9
Labour hold		Swing		

=== Sandfields East by-election, 2014 ===
A further by-election took place in the Sandfields East ward on 30 October 2014, following the death of Mike Davies.

Sandfields East by-election 2014
Party	Candidate	Votes	%	±%
Labour	Matthew Crowley	641		
UKIP	Keith Suter	361		
Conservative	Richard James Minshull	47		
Turnout		1,064	20.7	−2.6
Labour hold		Swing		

=== Cwmllynfell by-election 2015 ===
A by-election took place in the Cwmllynfell ward on 7 May 2015 following the death of Clifford Richards.

Cwmllynfell by-election 2015
Party	Candidate	Votes	%	±%
Labour	Kris Lloyd	365		
Plaid Cymru	Meirion Owen Jordan	222		
Green	Jude Bailey‐Murfin	52		
Majority		143		
Turnout		641	68.9	+19.1
Labour hold		Swing		
