= 2017 Neath Port Talbot County Borough Council election =

2017 Welsh local government election

Results of the 2017 Neath Port Talbot County Borough Council election

The 2017 election to Neath Port Talbot County Borough Council was held on 4 May 2017 as part of wider local elections across Wales. The election was preceded by the 2012 election. Four candidates (from the sixty four seats available) were elected unopposed.

Labour maintained control of the authority.

== Ward results ==
Nominations closed on 4 April 2017.

The following results were announced following the elections. In the case of wards electing more than one councillor the percentage figures reflect the number of ballot papers issued rather than the total number of votes.

=== Aberavon (three seats) ===
Ceri Golding and Mark Jones were elected as Labour candidates in 2012

Aberavon 2017
Party	Candidate	Votes	%	±%
Plaid Cymru	Scott Bamsey	543	33.5	
Labour	Steffan ap Dafydd	500	30.8	
Plaid Cymru	Nigel Thomas Hunt	491	30.3	
Plaid Cymru	Diane Thomas	485	29.9	
Labour	Colin Clement	475	29.3	
Labour	Keith Trelease Priddle	442	27.2	
Independent	Ceri P. Golding*	376	23.2	
Independent	John Davies	313	19.3	
Independent	Mark Jones*	307	18.9	
Independent	Marian A. Lewis	265	16.3	
Liberal Democrats	Cen Phillips	260	16.0	
Turnout		4,457	40.8	+5.0
Plaid Cymru gain from Labour		Swing		
Labour hold		Swing		
Plaid Cymru gain from SDP		Swing		

=== Aberdulais (one seat) ===
Aberdulais 2017
Party	Candidate	Votes	%	±%
Labour	Doreen Jones*	344		
Independent	Simon Peter Hopkins	282		
Plaid Cymru	Daniel Mark Thomas	118		
Majority		62		
Turnout		744	44.6	+3.8
Labour hold		Swing		

=== Alltwen (one seat) ===
Alltwen 2017
Party	Candidate	Votes	%	±%
Labour	Christopher John Jones	394		
Plaid Cymru	Sioned Ann Williams	347		
Conservative	Jacob Arron Jones	109		
Majority		47		
Turnout		850	42.9	+7.0
Labour hold		Swing		

=== Baglan (three seats) ===
Baglan 2017
Party	Candidate	Votes	%	±%
Labour	Peter Denis Richards*	1,309		
Labour	Carol Clement-Williams*	1,159		
Labour	Susanne Renkes	1,009		
Plaid Cymru	Nicola Louise Butterfield	699		
Turnout		1,912	36.5	−3.9
Labour hold		Swing		
Labour hold		Swing		
Labour hold		Swing		

=== Blaengwrach (one seat) ===
Blaengwrach 2017
Party	Candidate	Votes	%	±%
Plaid Cymru	Carol Edwards	400		
Labour	Phillip John Parfitt	158		
UKIP	Richard Herbert Pritchard	61		
Majority		242		
Turnout		619	42.3	+0.0
Plaid Cymru gain from Labour		Swing		

=== Briton Ferry East (one seat) ===
Colin Morgan was elected as a Labour candidate in 2012.

Briton Ferry East 2017
Party	Candidate	Votes	%	±%
Labour	Chris James	405		
Independent	Colin Morgan*	318		
Majority		87		
Turnout		723	34.3	+34.3
Labour hold		Swing		

=== Briton Ferry West (one seat) ===
Briton Ferry West 2017
Party	Candidate	Votes	%	±%
Labour	Hugh Newton James*	unopposed		
Labour hold		Swing		

=== Bryn and Cwmavon (three seats) ===
Bryn and Cwmavon 2017
Party	Candidate	Votes	%	±%
Labour	Rhidian Mizen	1,383		
Labour	Charlotte Emma Galsworthy	1,079		
Labour	Dave Whitelock*	1,072		
Plaid Cymru	Ian Bamsey	775		
Plaid Cymru	Lee Felton	673		
Turnout		2,114	41.6	+3.0
Labour hold		Swing		
Labour hold		Swing		
Labour hold		Swing		

=== Bryncoch North (one seat) ===
Bryncoch North 2017
Party	Candidate	Votes	%	±%
Plaid Cymru	Wyndham Fryer Griffiths	410		
Labour	Janet Louise Lockyer	243		
Conservative	Gavin Wycherley	201		
Majority		167		
Turnout		854	48.1	+2.3
Plaid Cymru hold		Swing		

=== Bryncoch South (two seats) ===
Bryncoch South 2012
Party	Candidate	Votes	%	±%
Plaid Cymru	Janice Dudley*	848		
Plaid Cymru	Chris Williams	808		
Labour	Emma Denholm-Hill	460		
Labour	Alex Sims	393		
Conservative	Richard Minshull	366		
Conservative	Shadanna Wycherley	290		
Green	Catrin Louise Brock	110		
Liberal Democrats	Frank Harvey Little	102		
Turnout		1,802	40.3	+3.0
Plaid Cymru hold		Swing		
Plaid Cymru gain from Labour		Swing		

=== Cadoxton (one seat) ===
Cadoxton 2012
Party	Candidate	Votes	%	±%
Labour	Annette Wingrave*	253		
Plaid Cymru	Joanna Hale	198		
Conservative	Peter Crocker-Jaques	82		
Independent	Robert Joseph King	65		
Liberal Democrats	Sheila Mary Kingston-Jones	46		
Majority		55		
Turnout		644	48.4	+12.7
Labour hold		Swing		

=== Cimla (two seats) ===
Cimla 2017
Party	Candidate	Votes	%	±%
Labour	John Warman*	871	79.5	
Labour	Adam McGrath	568	51.9	
Liberal Democrats	Charley Cross	320	29.2	
Turnout		1,095	35.6	−1.3
Labour hold		Swing		
Labour hold		Swing		

=== Coedffranc Central (two seats) ===
Coedffranc Central 2017
Party	Candidate	Votes	%	±%
Labour	Arthur Pendry Hodge Davies*	561		
Labour	Angharad Rebecca Aubrey	488		
Independent	Betsan Richards	346		
Plaid Cymru	Pauline M. Fellows	199		
Plaid Cymru	Russell G. Morris	140		
Turnout		1,000	35.6	+3.1
Labour hold		Swing		
Labour hold		Swing		

=== Coedffranc North (one seat) ===
Coedffranc North 2017
Party	Candidate	Votes	%	±%
Labour	Mike Harvey*	434		
Liberal Democrats	David Keith Davies	270		
UKIP	Margaret Duguid	69		
Majority		226		
Turnout		773	42.6	+3.0
Labour hold		Swing		

=== Coedffranc West (one seat) ===
Coedffranc West 2017
Party	Candidate	Votes	%	±%
Liberal Democrats	Helen Ceri Clarke	806		
Labour	Chris Wingrave	268		
Majority		538		
Turnout		1,074	36.7	+2.5
Liberal Democrats gain from Labour		Swing		

=== Crynant (one seat) ===
Crynant 2017
Party	Candidate	Votes	%	±%
Independent	Sian Harris	448		
Labour	Karen Elizabeth Pearson*	250		
Plaid Cymru	Suzanne Waldron	147		
Majority		198		
Turnout		845	56.6	+15.1
Independent gain from Labour		Swing		

=== Cwmllynfell (one seat) ===
Kris Lloyd had held the seat for Labour at a by-election following the death of the previous councilor.

Cwmllynfell 2017
Party	Candidate	Votes	%	±%
Plaid Cymru	Hugh Jones	283		
Labour	Kris Lloyd*	194		
Majority		89		
Turnout		477	51.7	+1.9
Plaid Cymru gain from Labour		Swing		

=== Cymmer (one seat) ===
Scott Jones stood down from the Labour Party in 2018

Cymmer 2017
Party	Candidate	Votes	%	±%
Labour	Scott Jones*	673		
Independent	Jeff Jones	370		
Majority		303		
Turnout		1,043	51.4	
Labour hold		Swing		

=== Dyffryn (one seat) ===
Dyffryn 2017
Party	Candidate	Votes	%	±%
Plaid Cymru	David Martyn Peters*	826		
Labour	Debbie Harvey	299		
Majority		527		
Turnout		1,125	47.4	+3.3
Plaid Cymru hold		Swing		

=== Glyncorrwg (one seat) ===
Glyncorrwg 2017
Party	Candidate	Votes	%	±%
Independent	Nicola-Jayne Elsie Davies	276		
Labour	Robert Joyce	239		
Majority		37		
Turnout		515	65.9	+9.3
Independent gain from Labour		Swing		

=== Glynneath (two seats) ===
Glynneath 2017
Party	Candidate	Votes	%	±%
Independent	Simon Anthony Knoyle	852		
Plaid Cymru	John Delwyn Morgan*	498		
Independent	John Evans	316		
Plaid Cymru	Philippa Jane Richards	281		
Labour	Gerry Reynolds	267		
Labour	Eddie Jones*	239		
Turnout		1,403	54.6	+21.5
Independent gain from Labour		Swing		
Plaid Cymru hold		Swing		

=== Godre'r Graig (one seat) ===
Godre'rgraig 2017
Party	Candidate	Votes	%	±%
Plaid Cymru	Rosalyn Davies*	409		
Labour	Brian Hastie	185		
Independent	Reg Atherton	69		
Majority		224		
Turnout		663	44.8	+1.0
Plaid Cymru hold		Swing		

=== Gwaun Cae Gurwen (one seat) ===
Gwaun Cae Gurwen 2017
Party	Candidate	Votes	%	±%
Labour	Sonia Helen Reynolds	523		
Plaid Cymru	Meirion Owen Jordan	357		
Majority		166		
Turnout		880	40.3	+2.6
Labour hold		Swing		

=== Gwynfi (one seat) ===
Gwynfi 2017
Party	Candidate	Votes	%	±%
Labour	Ralph Thomas*	273		
Independent	Jane Jones	214		
Majority		59		
Turnout		487	54.6	−9.2
Labour hold		Swing		

=== Lower Brynamman (one seat) ===
Lower Brynamman 2012
Party	Candidate	Votes	%	±%
Labour	Arwyn Nigel Woolcock*	439		
Plaid Cymru	Robert Howard Smith	93		
Majority				
Turnout				
Labour hold		Swing		

=== Margam (one seat) ===
Margam 2017
Party	Candidate	Votes	%	±%
Labour	Robert Jones*	610		
Conservative	Robert Jon Smith	279		
Majority				
Turnout				
Labour hold		Swing		

=== Neath East (three seats) ===
Neath East 2017
Party	Candidate	Votes	%	±%
Labour	Sheila Marlene Penry*	587		
Labour	Sandra Miller*	575		
Labour	John Miller*	527		
Plaid Cymru	Breandan Seosamh Dominic Mac Cathail	375		
Plaid Cymru	Paul Sambrook	325		
Plaid Cymru	Dani Robertson	294		
Conservative	Nicky Boyce	253		
Independent	Ian Richard Thomas	232		
Independent	Shaz Hughes	230		
Conservative	Robert Paul Harris	173		
Turnout				
Labour hold		Swing		
Labour hold		Swing		
Labour hold		Swing		

=== Neath North (two seats) ===
Neath North 2017
Party	Candidate	Votes	%	±%
Labour	Alan Richard Lockyer*	560		
Labour	Mark Protheroe*	517		
Independent	Andy Lodwig	515		
Conservative	Orla Sarah Lowe	378		
Turnout				
Labour hold		Swing		
Labour hold		Swing		

=== Neath South (two seats) ===
Neath South 2017
Party	Candidate	Votes	%	±%
Plaid Cymru	Jamie Evans	631		
Labour	Peter Albert Rees*	614		
Labour	Andrew Jenkins	600		
Plaid Cymru	Ann Rees-Sambrook	437		
Turnout				
Plaid Cymru gain from Labour		Swing		
Labour hold		Swing		

=== Onllwyn (one seat) ===
Onllwyn 2017
Party	Candidate	Votes	%	±%
Labour	George Martin Dean Cawsey	273		
Independent	Peter John Westall	248		
Majority		25		
Turnout				
Labour hold		Swing		

=== Pelenna (one seat) ===
Pelenna 2017
Party	Candidate	Votes	%	±%
Independent	Martin Ellis*	133		
Plaid Cymru	Hywel Alwyn Miles	132		
Independent	Peter Edward Hughes	114		
Labour	Andrew Richard Jones	90		
Majority		1		
Turnout				
Independent hold		Swing		

=== Pontardawe (two seats) ===
Pontardawe 2017
Party	Candidate	Votes	%	±%
Plaid Cymru	Linet Margaret Purcell*	992		
Plaid Cymru	Anthony John Richards	635		
Labour	Vince Hotten	622		
Labour	Michael Lloyd James*	609		
Conservative	Sascha Lopez	260		
Conservative	Kieran John Davies	233		
Turnout				
Plaid Cymru hold		Swing		
Plaid Cymru gain from Labour		Swing		

=== Port Talbot (three seats) ===
Port Talbot 2017
Party	Candidate	Votes	%	±%
Labour	Sharon Elizabeth Freeguard	unopposed		
Labour	Dennis Keogh*	unopposed		
Labour	Saifur Rahaman*	unopposed		
Labour hold		Swing		
Labour hold		Swing		
Labour hold		Swing		

=== Resolven (one seat) ===
Resolven 2017
Party	Candidate	Votes	%	±%
Labour	Desmond William Davies*	461		
Independent	Darren Lee Bromham-Nichols	388		
Plaid Cymru	David Trefor Jones	265		
Majority				
Turnout				
Labour hold		Swing		

=== Rhos (one seat) ===
Rhos 2017
Party	Candidate	Votes	%	±%
Labour	Alex Thomas*	440		
Plaid Cymru	Marcia Spooner	297		
Conservative	Amanda Wycherley	227		
Majority		143		
Turnout				
Labour hold		Swing		

=== Sandfields East (three seats) ===
Sandfields East 2017
Party	Candidate	Votes	%	±%
Labour	Edward Victor Latham*	1,064		
Labour	Sean Mark Pursey	1,002		
Labour	Matthew Crowley*	937		
Plaid Cymru	Deborah Mary Bamsey	583		
Independent	Captain Beany	504		
Turnout				
Labour hold		Swing		
Labour hold		Swing		
Labour gain from Independent		Swing		

=== Sandfields West (three seats) ===
Chaves and Evans were deselected as Labour candidates and stood as Independents.

Sandfields West 2017
Party	Candidate	Votes	%	±%
Labour	Suzanne Paddison*	851		
Labour	Oliver Stewart Davies	838		
Labour	Robert William Wood	749		
Plaid Cymru	Andrew Leonard John Bennison	430		
Independent	Audrey Chaves*	395		
Plaid Cymru	Sam Wright	364		
Plaid Cymru	Victoria Griffiths	360		
Independent	James Stephen Evans*	339		
Liberal Democrats	Taz Taylor	95		
Turnout				
Labour hold		Swing		
Labour hold		Swing		
Labour hold		Swing		

=== Seven Sisters (one seat) ===
Seven Sisters 2017
Party	Candidate	Votes	%	±%
Independent	Stephen Karl Hunt*	678		
Labour	Nia Ffion Herdman	284		
Majority				
Turnout				
Independent hold		Swing		

=== Taibach (two seats) ===
Taibach 2017
Party	Candidate	Votes	%	±%
Labour	Anthony James Taylor*	868		
Labour	Rachel Louise Taylor	756		
Independent	Andrew James Tutton	662		
Turnout				
Labour hold		Swing		
Labour hold		Swing		

=== Tonna (one seat) ===
Tonna 2017
Party	Candidate	Votes	%	±%
Labour	Leanne Claire Jones	327		
Plaid Cymru	Lee Michael Bromham-Nichols	305		
Conservative	Kathryn Elizabeth Ann Minshull	107		
Independent	Nick Williams	83		
Majority				
Turnout				
Labour hold		Swing		

=== Trebanos (one seat) ===
Trebanos 2017
Party	Candidate	Votes	%	±%
Plaid Cymru	Rebeca Phillips*	284		
Labour	Rosemary Jane Jones	187		
Majority				
Turnout				
Plaid Cymru hold		Swing		

=== Ystalyfera (one seat) ===
Ystalyfera 2017
Party	Candidate	Votes	%	±%
Plaid Cymru	Alun Llywelyn*	618		
Labour	Cathy James	305		
Majority				
Turnout				
Plaid Cymru hold		Swing		

== By-Elections 2017-2022 ==
=== Bryncoch South by-election 2017 ===
A by-election was held in Bryncoch South on 23 November 2017 following the death of Plaid Cymru councillor, Janice Dudley.

Bryncoch South by-election 2017
Party	Candidate	Votes	%	±%
Plaid Cymru	Jo Hale	525	49%	
Labour	Emma Denholm-Hall	306	29%	
Conservative	Peter Crocker-Jaques	105	10%	
Liberal Democrats	Sheila Kingston-Jones	92	9%	
UKIP	Darren Thomas	33	3%	

=== Gwynfi by-election 2018 ===
A by-election was held in Gwynfi on 16 August 2018 following the resignation of Labour Councillor, Ralph Thomas, after a secondary school was closed by the Council

Gwynfi by-election 2018
Party	Candidate	Votes	%	±%
Independent	Jane Jones	268	58%	+14
Plaid Cymru	Katie Jones	73	16%	+16
Labour	Nicola Irwin	60	13%	−43
Independent	David Joshua	45	10%	+10
Independent	Jac Paul	14	3%	+3
Conservative	Orla Lowe	4	1%	+1

=== Resolven by-election 2019 ===
A by-election was held in Resolven on 23 May 2019 following the death of Labour Councillor, Des Davies, a member of the Council since its formation in 1995.

Resolven by-election 2019
Party	Candidate	Votes	%	±%
Independent	Dean Lewis	699	60%	+25
Labour	Mark Francis	293	25%	−16
Plaid Cymru	Andrew Hippsley	121	10%	−14
Conservative	Jonathan Jones	34	3%	+3
Liberal Democrats	Sheila Kingston-Jones	23	2%	+2

=== Pelenna by-election 2019 ===
A by-election was held in Pelenna on 20 June 2019 following the death of Independent Councillor, Martin Ellis.

Pelenna by-election 2019
Party	Candidate	Votes	%	±%
Independent	Jeremy John Hurley	251	48%	+20
Plaid Cymru	Hywel Alwyn Miles	120	23%	−5
Independent	Peter Edward Hughes	105	20%	−4
Labour	Andrew Richard Jones	43	8%	−11
Liberal Democrats	Frank Little	6	1%	+1

=== Rhos by-election 2019 ===
The by-election was caused by the resignation of Labour councillor Alex Thomas.

Rhos by-election 14 November 2019
Party	Candidate	Votes	%	±%
Plaid Cymru	Marcia Spooner	359	54.0	
Conservative	Yvonne Gillian McGarry Lewis	162	24.0	
Labour	Rupert James Denholm-Hall	145	22.0	
Majority				
Turnout		666	34.0	
Registered electors		1,973		
Plaid Cymru gain from Labour		Swing		

=== Aberavon by-election 2021 ===
A by-election was held in Aberavon on 6 May 2021 following the death of Labour Councillor, Steffan ap Dafydd.

Aberavon by-election 2021
Party	Candidate	Votes	%	±%
Labour	Stephanie Lynch	677	37%	
Plaid Cymru	Andrew Dacey	647	35%	
Conservative	Liz Hill O'Shea	199	11%	
Independent	Diane Thomas	144	8%	
Gwlad	Ceri Golding	121	7%	
Propel	Julie Mills	34	2%	
