= Briton Ferry East =

Coordinates: 51.63801°N 3.81203°W

- Population: 2,894 (2001 census)
- Principal area: Neath Port Talbot
- Preserved county: West Glamorgan
- Country: Wales
- Sovereign state: United Kingdom
- UK Parliament: Aberafan Maesteg
- Senedd Cymru – Welsh Parliament: Aberavon
- Councillors: Chris James (Independent)

Briton Ferry East is an electoral ward of Neath Port Talbot county borough, Wales. Briton Ferry West falls within the parish of Briton Ferry and the parliamentary constituency of Aberafan Maesteg.

Briton Ferry East is bounded by the wards of Briton Ferry West to the west; Neath East and Cimla to the north; Pelenna to the east; Bryn and Cwmavon to the southeast; and Baglan to the south. Most of Briton Ferry East consists of open grassland and woodland with a residential and commercial strip to the far west of the ward.

== Election results ==
=== 2022 election ===
2022 election
Party	Candidate	Votes	%	±%
Independent	Chris James	351	44.1	
Labour	Gareth Rice	349	43.8	
Plaid Cymru	Lindsay Gwilym Barnett	87	10.9	
Majority		2	0.3	
Rejected ballots		9	1.1	
Turnout		796	34.8	
Registered electors		2,287		
Independent gain from Labour		Swing		

=== 2017 election ===
2017 election
Party	Candidate	Votes	%	±%
Labour	Chris James	405	55.6	
Independent	Colin Morgan	318	43.6	
Majority		87	11.9	
Rejected ballots		6	0.8	
Turnout		729	34.5	
Registered electors		2,110		
Labour hold		Swing		

=== 2012 election ===
2012 election
Party	Candidate	Votes	%	±%
Labour	Colin Morgan	Unopposed		
Registered electors		2,381		
Labour hold		Swing		

=== 2008 election ===
2008 election
Party	Candidate	Votes	%	±%
Labour	Colin Morgan	558	66.7	
Conservative	Anthony Vallario	266	31.8	
Majority		292	34.9	
Rejected ballots		13	1.6	
Turnout		837	34.8	
Registered electors		2,408		
Labour hold		Swing		

=== 2004 election ===
2004 election
Party	Candidate	Votes	%	±%
Labour	Colin Morgan	Unopposed		
Registered electors		2,409		
Labour hold		Swing		

=== 1999 election ===
1999 election
Party	Candidate	Votes	%	±%
Labour	C. Morgan	674	64.3	
Liberal Democrats	I. Sherwood	375	35.7	
Majority		299	28.5	
Turnout			44.3	
Registered electors		2,415		
Labour hold		Swing		

=== 1995 election ===
1995 election
Party	Candidate	Votes	%	±%
Labour	C. Morgan	734	65.2	
Plaid Cymru	S. Tudor	250	22.2	
Independent	G. Thompson	142	12.6	
Majority		484	43.0	
Turnout			45.0	
Registered electors		2,534		
Labour win (new seat)				
