= Seven Sisters (Neath Port Talbot ward) =

Coordinates: 51.76630°N 3.71137°W

- Population: 2,032 (2001 census)
- Principal area: Neath Port Talbot
- Preserved county: West Glamorgan
- Country: Wales
- Sovereign state: United Kingdom
- UK Parliament: Neath
- Senedd Cymru – Welsh Parliament: Neath

Seven Sisters was an electoral ward of the Welsh principal area of Neath Port Talbot county borough. The ward, which included, as well as Seven Sisters proper, the lesser settlements of Bryndulais and Nant-y-cafn, was coterminous with the area served by the Seven Sisters Community Council.

Lying in the upper Dulais Valley – in which coalmine workings are still very evident (the village is named after Seven Sisters Colliery which closed in the early 1960s) – the area is characterized by extensive forestry to the north, east and south, and open moorland in the northwest and central areas.

Following a 2020 boundary review by the Local Democracy and Boundary Commission for Wales, Seven Sisters was joined by the neighbouring communities of Crynant and Onllwyn to become 'Crynant, Onllwyn and Seven Sisters', effective from the 2022 local elections.

== Election results ==
=== 2017 election ===
2017 election
Party	Candidate	Votes	%	±%
Independent	Steve Hunt	678	70.3	−5.6
Labour	Nia Ffion Herdman	284	29.5	+5.6
Majority		394	40.9	−11.0
Rejected ballots		2	0.2	+0.1
Turnout		964	62.9	+0.0
Registered electors		1,532		−70
Independent hold		Swing		

=== 2012 election ===
2012 election
Party	Candidate	Votes	%	±%
Independent	Steve Hunt	764	75.9	+13.9
Labour	Jako Davies	241	23.9	−13.6
Majority		523	51.9	+27.4
Rejected ballots		1	0.1	-0.4
Turnout		1007	62.9	+5.6
Registered electors		1,602		−83
Independent hold		Swing		

=== 2008 election ===
2008 election
Party	Candidate	Votes	%	±%
Independent	Steve Hunt	599	62.0	New
Labour	Peter Lloyd	362	37.5	−17.0
Majority		237	24.5	+14.9
Rejected ballots		5	0.5	-0.1
Turnout		966	57.3	+12.2
Registered electors		1,685		+86
Independent gain from Labour		Swing		

=== 2004 election ===
2004 election
Party	Candidate	Votes	%	±%
Labour	Peter Lloyd	393	54.5	−16.3
Plaid Cymru	Cynthia Lloyd	324	44.9	+38.5'"`UNIQ−−ref−00000054−QINU`"'
Majority		69	9.6	−31.9
Rejected ballots		4	0.6	
Turnout		721	45.1	−6.6
Registered electors		1,599		−78
Labour hold		Swing		

=== 1999 election ===
1999 election
Party	Candidate	Votes	%	±%
Labour	P. Lloyd	603	70.8	+2.9
Independent	S. Jones	249	29.2	+3.5
Majority		354	41.5	−0.6
Turnout			51.7	−14.3
Registered electors		1,677		−62
Labour hold		Swing		

=== 1995 election ===
1995 election
Party	Candidate	Votes	%	±%
Labour	P. Lloyd	765	67.9	New
Independent	S. Jones	290	25.7	New
Plaid Cymru	A. Holloway	72	6.4	New
Majority		475	42.1	New
Turnout			66.0	New
Registered electors		1,739		New
Labour win (new seat)				
