= Abercregan =

Coordinates: 51.656533°N 3.662992°W

Abercregan is a village in the community of Cymer and Glyncorrwg, in the Welsh county borough of Neath Port Talbot, Glamorgan. It is situated around 12 kilometres (7.5 mi) north-east of Port Talbot and just west of Cymmer, and is also close to the River Afan. Abercregan was once a thriving mining community but since the decline of the British coal industry, much of the housing has been demolished and most of its inhabitants have moved to neighbouring villages. The 1980s and 1990s saw the closure of the village school, the boys club, post office and the last remaining shop 1989. The local authority decided to turn the school into a Field Study Centre, which was later closed and relocated to Margam Park. The building was demolished following the closure.

Now a small village of around 30 houses, Abercregan is in surroundings which have returned to their former pre-industrial rural condition. Abercregan is within the boundaries of the Afan Forest Park which is a joint venture between Forest Enterprise and local businesses which provide for and promote green tourism in the area. Following campaigning by local residents, Abercregan is now home to the only designated village green in the Neath Port Talbot area.

Abercregan United Football Club has a history of winning many league titles and cups since its formation. The club folded at the end of the 2016–17 season but have since reformed and currently play in the Port Talbot and District Football League. Home matches were originally played on the Riverside Ground in Abercregan which was condemned by the local council in 2006. Home games are now played at the Red Field in Cymmer.

The former football changing rooms in Abercregan, which had previously been the village chapel, was purchased and is now being used as a place of worship again by the Afan Christian Fellowship.
