= Aberafan Maesteg =

UK Parliament constituency (since 2024)

- County constituency for the House of Commons
- Interactive map of the constituency.
- Location of the constituency within Wales
- Preserved county: West Glamorgan, Mid Glamorgan
- Electorate: 69,817 (March 2020)
- Major settlements: Aberavon, Maesteg, Port Talbot, Briton Ferry

Current constituency
- Created: 2024
- Member of Parliament: Stephen Kinnock (Labour)
- Seats: One
- Created from: Aberavon, Bridgend, Ogmore

Overlaps
- Senedd: Afan Ogwr Rhondda

Aberafan Maesteg is a constituency of the House of Commons in the UK Parliament. It was first contested at the 2024 general election following the 2023 review of Westminster constituencies. It is currently represented by Stephen Kinnock of the Labour Party, who represented the predecessor constituency of Aberavon from 2015 to 2024. He has served as Secretary of State for Wales since 2026.

== Constituency profile ==
The seat covers the industrial towns of Port Talbot and Maesteg and a more rural area around the Afan Valley further north. Rhondda Valley including Porth and Tonypandy. Electoral Calculus characterises the seat as "Traditional", reflecting a working-class population who have largely supported Labour. Incomes and house prices are well below UK averages.

== Boundaries ==
Under the 2023 review, the constituency was defined as being composed of the following, as they existed on 1 December 2020:

- The County Borough of Bridgend wards of: Caerau, Cornelly, Llangynwyd, Maesteg East, Maesteg West, and Pyle.
- The County Borough of Neath Port Talbot wards of: Aberavon, Baglan, Briton Ferry East, Briton Ferry West, Bryn and Cwmavon, Cymmer, Glyncorrwg, Gwynfi, Margam, Pelenna, Port Talbot, Sandfields East, Sandfields West, and Tai-bach.

Following local government boundary reviews which came into effect in May 2022, the constituency now comprises the following from the 2024 general election:

- The County Borough of Bridgend wards of: Caerau, Cornelly, Llangynwyd, Maesteg East, Maesteg West, and Pyle, Kenfig Hill and Cefn Cribwr (part).
- The County Borough of Neath Port Talbot wards of: Aberavon, Baglan, Briton Ferry East, Briton Ferry West, Bryn and Cwmavon, Cimla and Pelenna (part), Cymmer and Glyncorrwg, Gwynfi and Croeserw, Margam and Tai-bach, Port Talbot, Sandfields East, and Sandfields West.

By population, it is made up as follows:

- 61.1% from Aberavon, accounting for 81.1% of the former constituency (parts in Neath Port Talbot CB, except Pelenna).
- 21.6% from Ogmore, accounting for 25.8% of the former constituency (Maesteg).
- 16.0% from Bridgend, accounting for 17.0% of that constituency under its 2010–2024 boundaries (Cornelly and Pyle).
- 1.3% from Neath, accounting for 1.7% of the former constituency (Pelenna).

== Elections ==
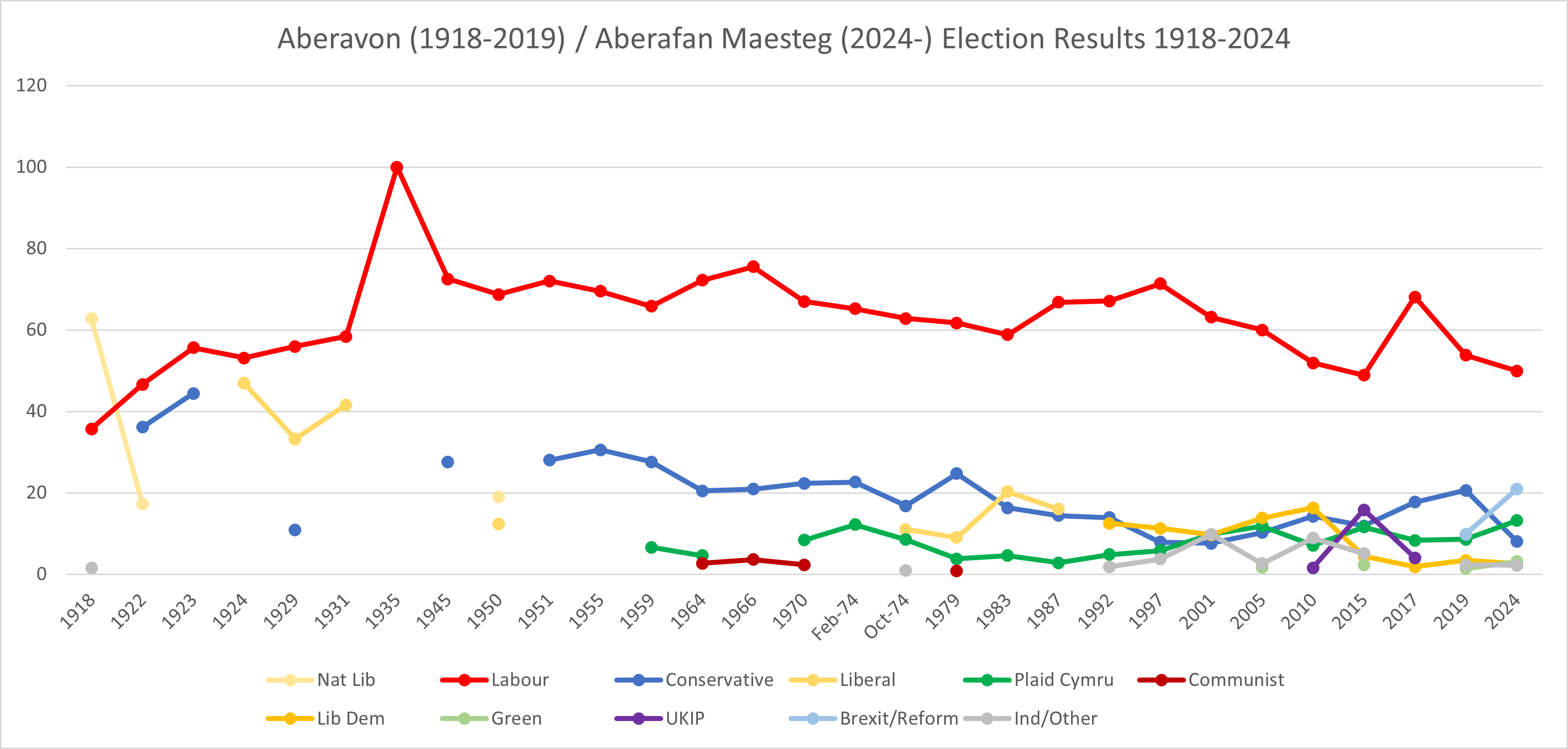
Aberavon (1918–2019) / Aberafan Maesteg (2024–) Election Results 1918–2024

=== Elections in the 2020s ===
2024 general election: Aberafan Maesteg
Party	Candidate	Votes	%	±%
Labour	Stephen Kinnock	17,838	49.9	−3.0
Reform	Mark Griffiths	7,484	20.9	+12.4
Plaid Cymru	Colin Deere	4,719	13.2	+4.2
Conservative	Abigail Mainon	2,903	8.1	−14.5
Green	Nigel Hill	1,094	3.1	+1.5
Liberal Democrats	Justin Griffiths	916	2.6	−1.1
Independent	Captain Beany	618	1.7	+0.1
Heritage	Rhiannon Morrissey	183	0.5	N/A
Majority		10,354	29.0	−1.3
Turnout		35,755	49.3	−14.3
Registered electors		72,580		
Labour hold		Swing		

=== Elections in the 2010s ===
2019 notional result (Note: Estimate of the 2019 general election result as if the revised boundaries recommended under the 2023 boundary review were in place)
Party	Vote	%
Labour	23,509	52.9
Conservative	10,052	22.6
Plaid Cymru	3,991	9.0
Brexit Party	3,794	8.5
Liberal Democrats	1,645	3.7
Independent	731	1.6
Green Party	701	1.6
Majority	13,457	30.3
Turnout	44,423	63.6
Electorate	69,817	
