= Baglan (electoral ward) =

Coordinates: 51.61850°N 3.79392°W

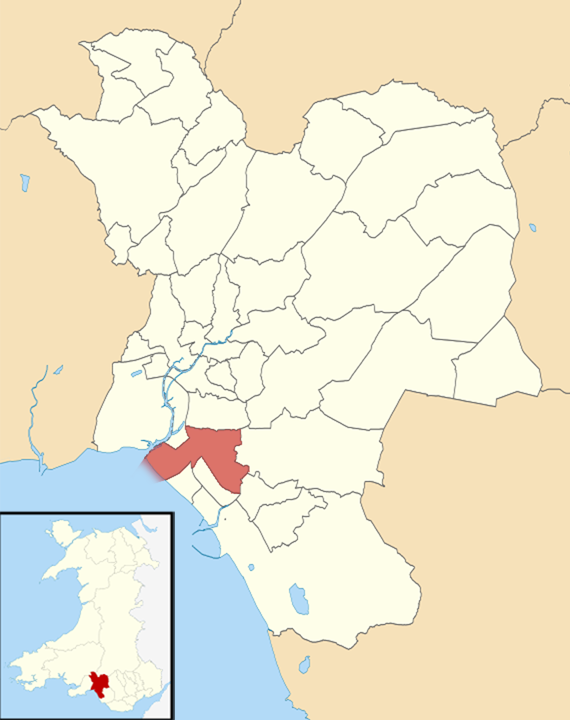
- Location of Baglan ward within Neath Port Talbot County Borough
- Population: 6,819 (2011 census)
- Principal area: Neath Port Talbot
- Preserved county: West Glamorgan
- Country: Wales
- Sovereign state: United Kingdom
- UK Parliament: Aberafan Maesteg
- Senedd Cymru – Welsh Parliament: Aberavon
- Councillors: Carol Clement-Williams (Labour); Josh Tuck (Labour); Susanne Renkes (Labour)

The Baglan electoral ward includes the communities of Baglan and Baglan Bay, in Neath Port Talbot county borough, Wales. Baglan is in the Senedd constituency of Aberavon and the UK constituency of Aberafan Maesteg.

Baglan is bounded by the wards of Briton Ferry West and Briton Ferry East to the north; Bryn and Cwmavon and Port Talbot to the east; and Aberavon and Sandfields West to the south.

The Baglan ward can be divided roughly into three zones. The industrial zone lies to the south west of the M4 Motorway at Baglan Bay on the site that was once occupied by a BP Chemical works. It is now an industrial regeneration area. The residential zone lies just to the northeast of the M4, consisting of Baglan village. The far north and eastern portion of the ward consists of undeveloped grassland and woodland.

== County council elections ==
On 17 July 2025, following the passing of councillor Peter Richards, a by-election was held in Baglan for the vacant seat. The results of this by-election were as follows:

Candidate	Party	Votes	Status
Josh Tuck	Welsh Labour	708	Labour Hold
Wendy Blethyn	Independent	532	
John Bamsey	Reform UK	447	
Colin Deere	Plaid Cymru	149	
Lee Stabbins	Welsh Conservatives	19	
Nigel Bartolotti Hill	Wales Green Party	18	
Tomos Gruffydd Roberts-Young	Welsh Liberal Democrats	13	

The ward elects three county councillors to Neath Port Talbot County Borough Council. At the Neath Port Talbot local council elections on 4 May 2017, the results were:

Candidate	Party	Votes	Status
Peter Richards	Labour	1309	Labour hold
Carol Clement	Labour	1159	Labour hold
Susan Renkes	Labour	1009	Labour hold
Nicola Butterfield	Plaid Cymru	699	

On 3 May 2012, the Local Council elections were held. The turnout was 40.42% and the results were:

Candidate	Party	Votes	Status
Peter Richards	Labour	1190	Labour hold
Carol Clement	Labour	1038	Labour hold
Paul Greenaway	Labour	906	Labour gain
David Coslett	Independent	881	
John Tallamy	Independent	862	
Mike Lewis	Independent	861	
T J Morgan	Conservative	186	
