= Port Talbot (electoral ward) =

Coordinates: 51.59531°N 3.78145°W

Port Talbot ward
- Population: 5,276 (2001 census)
- Principal area: Neath Port Talbot
- Preserved county: West Glamorgan
- Country: Wales
- Sovereign state: United Kingdom
- UK Parliament: Aberafan Maesteg
- Senedd Cymru – Welsh Parliament: Aberavon
- Councillors: Saifur Rahaman (Labour); Sharon Freeguard (Labour)

The electoral ward of Port Talbot in Neath Port Talbot county borough covers the town centre of Port Talbot and the district of Pen-y-cae. The rest of the ward to the east consists of grassland and woodland. The electoral ward is coterminous with the Port Talbot community boundaries.

Port Talbot is bounded by the wards of Baglan and Bryn and Cwmavon to the north; Taibach and Margam to the south; and Aberavon to the west and is in the Senedd constituency of Aberavon and the UK constituency of Aberafan Maesteg.

== Local council elections ==
=== 2022 ===
The election scheduled for 5 May 2022 was delayed until 23 June in the Port Talbot ward, following the death of Independent candidate Andrew Tutton during the campaign. The two seats were eventually won by the Labour Party, re-electing Saifur Rahaman with 914 votes and Sharon Freeguard with 898 votes.

=== 2017 ===
It was announced that for the 2017 Local Council Elections only three nominations were received in the ward. These were the current councillors Dennis Keogh, Saifur Rahaman and Sharon Freegaurd. This meant that no election was held and the three candidates became the councillors of the Port Talbot ward without contest.

=== 2012 ===
In the 2012 local council elections, the electorate turnout was 34.92%. The results were: Cllr Rahaman became Neath Port Talbot's first Asian councillor.

Candidate	Party	Votes	Status
Ian James	Labour	831	Labour hold
Dennis Keogh	Labour	782	Labour hold
Saifur Rahaman	Labour	707	Labour gain
Andrew Tutton	NPT Independent Party	592	
Marge Jones	NPT Independent Party	528	
Stephen Griffiths	NPT Independent Party	479	
Keith Miller	Conservative	107	
