= Resolven (electoral ward) =

Coordinates: 51.70990°N 3.69477°W

- Population: 3,135 (2011 census)
- Principal area: Neath Port Talbot
- Preserved county: West Glamorgan
- Country: Wales
- Sovereign state: United Kingdom
- UK Parliament: Neath
- Senedd Cymru – Welsh Parliament: Neath
- Councillors: Dean Lewis (Independent)

Resolven is and electoral ward of Neath Port Talbot county borough, Wales. Resolven is made up of the parishes of Resolven and Clyne and Melincourt.

Resolven includes some or all of the settlements of Resolven and Clyne in the parliamentary constituency of Neath. The ward consists of steep wooded hills to the northwest and north east with undeveloped moorland to the south. It is cut through the middle by the Neath Valley which is traversed by the A465 'Heads of Valleys' road.

Resolven is bounded by the wards of Glynneath to the north; Blaengwrach to the northeast; Glyncorrwg to the east; Cymmer to the southeast; Pelenna to the south; Tonna to the southwest; Aberdulais to the west; and Crynant to the northwest.

In the 2017 local council elections, the electorate turnout was %. The results were:

Candidate	Party	Votes	Status
Des Davies	Labour	461	Labour hold
Darren Bromham-Nichols	Independent	388	
David Jones	Plaid Cymru	265	

In February 2019, Resolven councillor Des Davies died and hence the 2019 Resolven council by-election took place on May 23, 2019. The results were:

Candidate	Party	Votes	Status
Mark Neal Francis	Labour	293	
Andrew Hippsley	Plaid Cymru	121	
Jonathan Liam Jones	Conservative	34	
Sheila Kingston-Jones	Liberal Democrats	23	
Dean Lewis	Independent	699	Independent gain from Labour
