= Coedffranc West =

Coordinates: 51.62998°N 3.86517°W

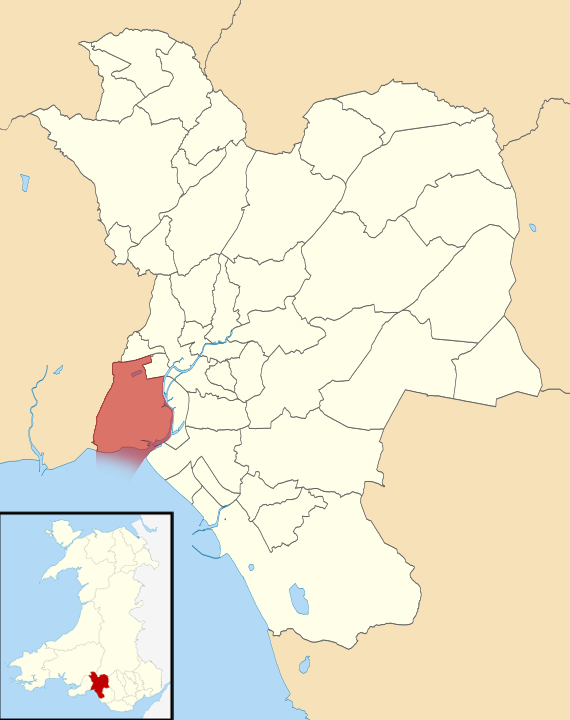
- Location of Coedffranc West ward within Neath Port Talbot County Borough
- Population: 2,652 (2011 census)
- Principal area: Neath Port Talbot
- Preserved county: West Glamorgan
- Country: Wales
- Sovereign state: United Kingdom
- UK Parliament: Neath and Swansea East
- Senedd Cymru – Welsh Parliament: Aberavon
- Councillors: Helen Ceri Clarke (Welsh Liberal Democrats); Cen Phillips (Welsh Liberal Democrats)

Coedffranc West is an electoral ward of Neath Port Talbot county borough, Wales. As of May 2022, it is represented by two councillors from the Welsh Liberal Democrats.

Coedffranc West is bounded by the wards of Llansamlet and Bonymaen of Swansea to the west; Coedffranc Central and Coedffranc North to the north; and Briton Ferry West to the east. It is bounded to the south by Swansea Bay.

Coedffranc West consists of some or all of the following areas: Coed Darcy, Crymlyn Bog, Crymlyn Burrows, Jersey Marine, Llandarcy and Skewen. Much of the south-western part of this ward is perceived to be in Swansea by the local people of Neath and Swansea.

Coedffranc West was an electoral ward of West Glamorgan until 4 May 1989, when Coedffranc Central and Coedffranc West became a Coedffranc ward under The County of West Glamorgan (Electoral Arrangements) Order 1989. Coedffranc Central and Coedffranc West were recreated for the 1995 elections.

The Linamar (formerly Ford, then Visteon) axle and transmission components factory is located at Crymlyn Burrows in the south of the ward. A distribution centre for Amazon.co.uk is located in the area beside the Visteon factory. The 18 hole Swansea Bay Golf Course is located to the east of the ward.

== Local council elections ==
In the 2012 local council elections, the electorate turnout was 34.22%. The results were:

| Candidate | Party | Votes | Status |
|---|---|---|---|
| Harry Bebell | Labour | 406 | Labour hold |
| Helen Ceri Clarke | Liberal Democrats | 317 | |

In February 2017, Councillor Harry Bebell left the Labour party and sat as an Independent.

In the May 2017 local council elections, the results were:

| Candidate | Party | Votes | Status |
|---|---|---|---|
| Helen Ceri Clarke | Liberal Democrats | 806 | Liberal Democrats gain |
| Chris Wingrave | Labour | 268 | |
