= Glyncorrwg =

Village in Wales

Coordinates: 51.679°N 3.628°W

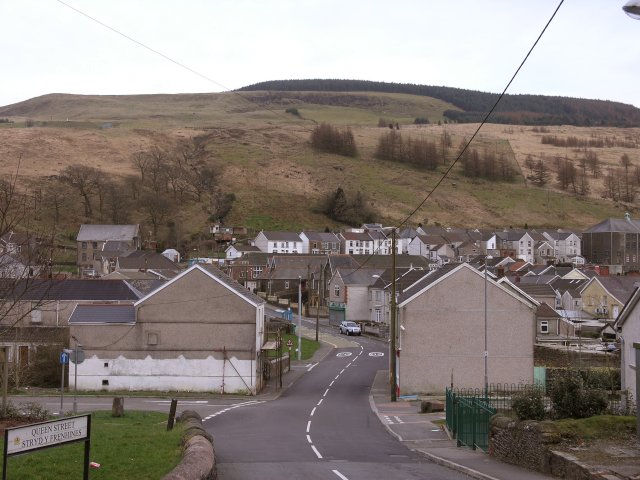

- Location within Neath Port Talbot
- Population: 5,283 2011 census
- OS grid reference: SS874989
- Community: Cymer and Glyncorrwg
- Principal area: Neath Port Talbot
- Preserved county: West Glamorgan
- Country: Wales
- Sovereign state: United Kingdom
- Post town: Port Talbot
- Postcode district: SA13
- Dialling code: 01639
- Police: South Wales
- Fire: Mid and West Wales
- Ambulance: Welsh
- UK Parliament: Aberafan Maesteg
- Senedd Cymru – Welsh Parliament: Aberavon

Glyncorrwg is a village in the Afan Valley, in southern Wales.

Glyncorrwg is also the name of an electoral ward and formerly a community covering the village and surrounding countryside, in Neath Port Talbot county borough. Glyncorrwg is part of the community known as the Afan Valleys, which also contains the villages of Abergwynfi, Blaengwynfi, Croeserw, Cymmer, Abercregan, Duffryn and Glyncorwg itself. The population of the community of Glyncorrwg was recorded as 5,544 in the 2001 census, reducing to 5,283 at the 2011 census. The population of the Glyncorrwg electoral ward was 1,096 at the 2011 census.

== History ==
Glyncorrwg was once an important coal mining centre, typical of the South Wales Valleys. With the decline of the coal mining industry during the 1970s, buildings were cleared away, factories closed and people left the area.

In 1990, the community decided to take advantage of the local scenery and established a series of ponds along the narrow valley. Trout fishing, coarse fishing, and canoeing are now popular sports in the area. There are also miles of old flat railway trackbed lines and steep mountain slopes providing opportunities for cycling, hill walking and mountain biking.

== Glyncorrwg Health Centre ==
Dr Julian Tudor-Hart established a famous research and teaching practice in Glyncorrwg. He arrived in 1961 and conducted a series of epidemiological studies on the practice population - a population of about 1900 which was relatively stable and which he got to know well. He established a health centre committee with a public health focus and demonstrated that systematic case-finding and regular follow-up produced real benefits. In 1987, he found that age-standardised death rates under 65 were 28% lower in Glyncorrwg than in nearby Blaengwynfi over the previous five-year period. This approach, which was the subject of many publications, led eventually to the introduction of the Quality and Outcomes Framework, which rewarded general practitioners for meeting targets for intervention in the management of disease.

== Glyncorrwg Coal Company ==
The South Wales Mineral Railway reached Glyncorrwg in 1863. It was always short of funds so was leased to the Glyncorrwg Coal Company, which became the Glyncorrwg Colliery Company Limited in 1870. This company operated a local coal mine and needed the railway to cheaply transport coal down to Briton Ferry.

== Government and politics ==
The electoral ward of Glyncorrwg elects a county councillor to Neath Port Talbot County Borough Council. The ward is surrounded by moorland which in turn is planted with coniferous forest. Glyncorrwg is bounded by the wards of Blaengwrach in the Vale of Neath to the north; Treherbert in the county of Rhondda Cynon Taf to the east; by Gwynfi and Cymmer in the (Afan Valley) to the south; and by Resolven to the west.

In the 2012 local council elections, the electorate turnout for Glyncorrwg was 56.59%. The results were:

Candidate	Party	Votes	Status
Glyn Rawlings	Labour	271	Labour hold
Lindsay Milsom	Independent	201	

In the 2017 local council elections, the results were:

Candidate	Party	Votes	Status
Nicola Davies	Independent	276	Independent gain
Robert Joyce	Labour	239	

In 2022. the community was abolished to form Gwynfi and Croeserw and Cymer and Glyncorrwg.

Glyncorrwg is in the Aberavon Senedd constituency and Aberafan Maesteg UK constituency.

== Pen y Cymoedd ==
In May 2012 it was announced that the Pen y Cymoedd wind farm, the highest-generating onshore wind farm in Wales, had received government backing. The development is managed by Swedish-based Vattenfall, and its 76 turbines became operational in 2017. The turbines can produce enough electricity to power 15% of Welsh homes annually.

== See also ==
- Afan Forest Park
