= Neath East =

Coordinates: 51.65056°N 3.81398°W

- Population: 6,401 (2011 census)
- Principal area: Neath Port Talbot
- Preserved county: West Glamorgan
- Country: Wales
- Sovereign state: United Kingdom
- UK Parliament: Neath
- Senedd Cymru – Welsh Parliament: Neath
- Councillors: Sheila Penry (Labour); John Miller (Labour); Sandra Miller (Labour)

Neath East is an electoral ward of Neath Port Talbot county borough, Wales. Neath East falls within the community of Neath.

Neath East includes some or all of the neighbourhoods of Melincryddan, Pencaerau, Penrhiwtyn in the parliamentary constituency of Neath. It is bounded by the wards of Coedffranc Central to the northwest; Dyffryn and Neath North to the north; Neath South and Cimla to the east; and Briton Ferry West and Briton Ferry East to the south.

The ward contains marshland to the west, an industrial and residential area in the middle and grassland and woodland to the east.

== Election results ==
In the 2017 local council elections, the results were:

Candidate	Party	Votes	Status
Sheila Penry	Labour	587	Labour hold
Sandra Miller	Labour	575	Labour hold
John Miller	Labour	527	Labour hold
Breandan MacCathail	Plaid Cymru	375	
Paul Sambrook	Plaid Cymru	337	
Dani Robertson	Plaid Cymru	294	
Nicky Boyce	Conservative	253	
Ian Thomas	Independent	232	
Shaz Hughes	Independent	230	
Robert Harris	Conservative	173	

In the 2012 local council elections, the electorate turnout was 27.15%. The results were:

Candidate	Party	Votes	Status
Sheila Penry	Labour	905	Labour hold
John Miller	Labour	826	Labour hold
Sandra Miller	Labour	808	Labour hold
Breandan MacCathail	Plaid Cymru	452	
Gareth Thomas	Plaid Cymru	391	
Philippa Jane Edwards	Plaid Cymru	365	
