= Bryn and Cwmavon =

Coordinates: 51.61451°N 3.76054°W

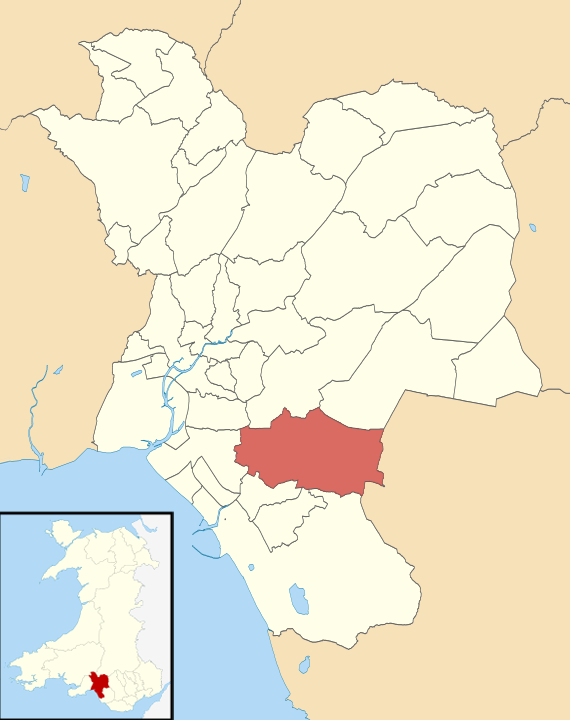
- Location of Bryn and Cwmavon ward within Neath Port Talbot County Borough
- Population: 6,517 (2001 census)
- Principal area: Neath Port Talbot
- Preserved county: West Glamorgan
- Country: Wales
- Sovereign state: United Kingdom
- UK Parliament: Aberafan Maesteg
- Senedd Cymru – Welsh Parliament: Aberavon
- Councillors: Rhidian Mizen (Labour); Charlotte Galsworthy (Labour); David Whitelock (Labour)

Bryn and Cwmavon (Welsh: Bryn a Chwmafan) is an electoral ward of Neath Port Talbot county borough, south Wales. The electoral ward comprises the parishes of Bryn and Cwmavon.

Bryn and Cwmavon consists of some or all of the following areas: Bryn, Brynbryddan, Cwmavon, Pontrhydyfen in the Senedd constituency of Aberavon and the UK constituency of Aberafan Maesteg. The largest settlement in the ward is Cwmavon. The rest of the ward consists mostly of woodland and open moorland.

Bryn and Cwmavon is bounded by the wards of Pelenna and Cymmer to the north; Maesteg and Caerau of Bridgend county borough to the east; Margam, Taibach and Port Talbot to the south; Baglan to the west and Briton Ferry East to the northwest.

In the 2017 local council elections, the electorate turnout for Bryn and Cwmavon was 42%. The results were:

Candidate	Party	Votes	Status
Rhidian Mizen	Labour	1383	Labour hold
Charlotte Galsworthy	Labour	1079	Labour hold
David Whitelock	Labour	1072	Labour hold
Ian Bamsey	Plaid Cymru	775	
Lee Felton	Plaid Cymru	673	

In the 2012 local council elections, the electorate turnout for Bryn and Cwmavon was 38.57%. The results were:

Candidate	Party	Votes	Status
David Williams	Labour	1321	Labour hold
Marian Lewis	Labour	1168	Labour hold
David Whitelock	Labour	987	Labour gain
Brinley Roblin	Independent	631	
Vince Williams	Independent	500	
David Shepherd	Independent	358	
