= Glynneath (electoral ward) =

Coordinates: 51.74693°N 3.61938°W

- Population: 3,430 (2011 census)
- Principal area: Neath Port Talbot
- Preserved county: West Glamorgan
- Country: Wales
- Sovereign state: United Kingdom
- UK Parliament: Neath and Swansea East
- Senedd Cymru – Welsh Parliament: Neath
- Councillors: Simon Anthony Knoyle (Independent)

Glynneath is an electoral ward in Neath Port Talbot county borough, Wales.

The electoral ward of Glynneath consists of some or all of the following settlements: Glynneath, Morfa Glas, Rheola, Crugau, Pont-walby, Bryn-awel, Pentreclwydau and Aber-pergwym in the parliamentary constituency of Neath and Swansea East. Most of the ward consists of woodland. The floor of the Vale of Neath crosses the ward on its south eastern edge. The largest settlement in the ward is in the town of Glynneath near the northeast. The far north eastern areas of the ward consists of open farmland.

Glynneath is bounded by the wards of Onllwyn to the north; Tawe Uchaf (in Powys) to the north-east; Rhigos (in Rhondda Cynon Taf) to the east; Blaengwrach to the south-east; Resolven to the south; Crynant to the south-west; and Seven Sisters to the west.

== Election results ==
In the 2022 local council elections the results were:

=== Glynneath Central and East (one seat) ===
Glynneath Central and East 2022
Party	Candidate	Votes	%	±%
Independent	Simon Anthony Knoyle*	547	59.0	
Plaid Cymru	John Blower	209	22.5	
Independent	David Richards	171	18.4	
Majority		338		
Turnout		938	50	
Independent hold		Swing		
