= Neath South =

Coordinates: 51.6544°N 3.8011°W

- Population: 4,975 (2011 census)
- Principal area: Neath Port Talbot
- Preserved county: West Glamorgan
- Country: Wales
- Sovereign state: United Kingdom
- UK Parliament: Neath
- Senedd Cymru – Welsh Parliament: Neath
- Councillors: Jamie Evans (Plaid Cymru); Peter Rees (Labour)

Neath South is an electoral ward of Neath Port Talbot county borough, Wales falling in the community of Neath.

Neath South consists of some or all of the settlements of Cimla and Mount Pleasant in the parliamentary constituency of Neath. It is bounded by the wards of Neath East to the west; Neath North to the north; and Cimla to the east.

== Election results ==
In the 2012 local council elections, the electorate turnout was 31.14%. The results were:

Candidate	Party	Votes	Status
Peter Rees	Labour	718	Labour hold
Mal Gunter	Labour	665	Labour hold
Helen Morgan	NPT Independent Party	207	
David Morgan	NPT Independent Party	190	
Rob Parry	Plaid Cymru	153	
Chris Williams	Plaid Cymru	146	

Malcolm Gunter died following the election; a by-election was held on 6 December 2012 to fill the vacant seat. With a 14.5% turnout, the result was:

Candidate	Party	Votes	Status
Andrew Jenkins	Labour	399	Labour hold
Charlotte May Cross	Liberal Democrats	130	

In the 2017 local council elections, the results were:

Candidate	Party	Votes	Status
Jamie Evans	Plaid Cymru	631	Plaid Cymru gain
Peter Rees	Labour	614	Labour hold
Andrew Jenkins	Labour	600	
Ann Rees-Sambrook	Plaid Cymru	437	
