= Coedffranc Central =

Coordinates: 51.65899°N 3.85046°W

- Population: 3,990 (2011 census)
- Principal area: Neath Port Talbot
- Preserved county: West Glamorgan
- Country: Wales
- Sovereign state: United Kingdom
- UK Parliament: Neath and Swansea East
- Senedd Cymru – Welsh Parliament: Aberavon
- Councillors: Nathan Goldup-John (Green); Angharad Aubrey (Labour)

Coedffranc Central is an electoral ward of Neath Port Talbot county borough, Wales. Coedffranc Central is a part of the Coedffranc community and is in the Senedd constituency of Aberavon and the UK constituency of Neath and Swansea East.

Coedffranc Central is bounded by the wards of Coedffranc West to the southwest; Coedffranc North to the north; Dyffryn to the east; and Neath East and Briton Ferry West to the south east. Almost all the ward is built up consisting of residential areas and shopping streets covering the centre of the village of Skewen.

Coedffranc Central was an electoral ward of West Glamorgan until 4 May 1989, when Coedffranc Central and Coedffranc West became a Coedffranc ward under The County of West Glamorgan (Electoral Arrangements) Order 1989. Coedffranc Central and Coedffranc West were recreated for the 1995 elections.

== Local council elections ==
In the 2022 local council elections, the results were:

Coedffranc Central 2022
Party	Candidate	Votes	%	±%
Green	Nathan Goldup-John	552	25	
Labour	Angharad Aubrey*	516	24	
Labour	Annette Wingrave	478	22	
Green	Bethany Payne	395	18	
Independent	David Richards	134	6	
Liberal Democrats	Frank Little	108	5	
Turnout		1,203	33	−2.6
Green gain from Labour		Swing		
Labour hold		Swing		

In the 2017 local council elections, the results were:

Candidate	Party	Votes	Status
Arthur Davies	Labour	561	Labour hold
Angharad Aubrey	Labour	488	Labour hold
Betsan Richards	Independent	346	
Pauline Fellowes	Plaid Cymru	199	
Russell Morris	Plaid Cymru	140	

In the 2012 local council elections, the electorate turnout was 32.49%. The results were:

Candidate	Party	Votes	Status
Arthur Davies	Labour	616	Labour hold
Paula Bebell	Labour	382	Labour gain
Betsan Richards	Independent	297	
Lee Saunders	NPT Independent Party	206	
Pauline Fellowes	Plaid Cymru	125	
Russell Morris	Plaid Cymru	90	
