= Cwmllynfell =

- Location within Neath Port Talbot
- Population: 1,172 (2011 census)
- OS grid reference: SN747127
- Principal area: Neath Port Talbot
- Preserved county: West Glamorgan
- Country: Wales
- Sovereign state: United Kingdom
- Post town: SWANSEA
- Postcode district: SA9
- Dialling code: 01639
- Police: South Wales
- Fire: Mid and West Wales
- Ambulance: Welsh
- UK Parliament: Neath
- Senedd Cymru – Welsh Parliament: Neath
- Councillors: Hugh Jones (Plaid Cymru)
- List of places UK Wales Neath Port Talbot 51.79887°N 3.81847°W Map of the community

Cwmllynfell (Welsh pronunciation) is a village, community and electoral ward in Neath Port Talbot county borough, Wales.

== Amenities ==
Cwmllynfell has its own local rugby union team - Cwmllynfell RFC. Also, a bilingual primary school, supermarket, post office, village hall, church and chapels. Nearby there is the Black Mountain which supplies views to the village.

== Electoral ward ==
The electoral ward consists of some or all of the following areas: Blaen-nant, Bryn-Melyn, Celliwarog, Cwmllynfell, Rhiw-fawr in the parliamentary constituency of Neath. Cwmllynfell is bounded by the wards of Quarter Bach of Carmarthenshire to the northeast; Cwmtwrch of Powys to the east; Ystalyfera to the southeast; Pontardawe to the southwest; Gwaun-Cae-Gurwen to the west and Lower Brynamman to the northwest.

In the 2017 local council elections the results were:

Candidate	Party	Votes	Status
Hugh Jones	Plaid Cymru	283	Plaid Cymru gain
Kris Lloyd	Labour	194	

In the 2012 local council elections the turn out was 49.78%. The results were:

Candidate	Party	Votes	Status
Clifford Richards	Labour	348	Labour hold
David James	Plaid Cymru	110	

== Earthquake ==
At 14:31 on 17 February 2018 a field 2¼ miles south-southwest of the village near Gwrhyd Chapel was the epicentre of a 4.6 magnitude earthquake, the largest in the British Isles since 2008. The quake was felt as far away as Blackpool.
