= Gwynfi =

Electoral ward of Neath Port Talbot, Wales

Coordinates: 51.65276°N 3.60156°W

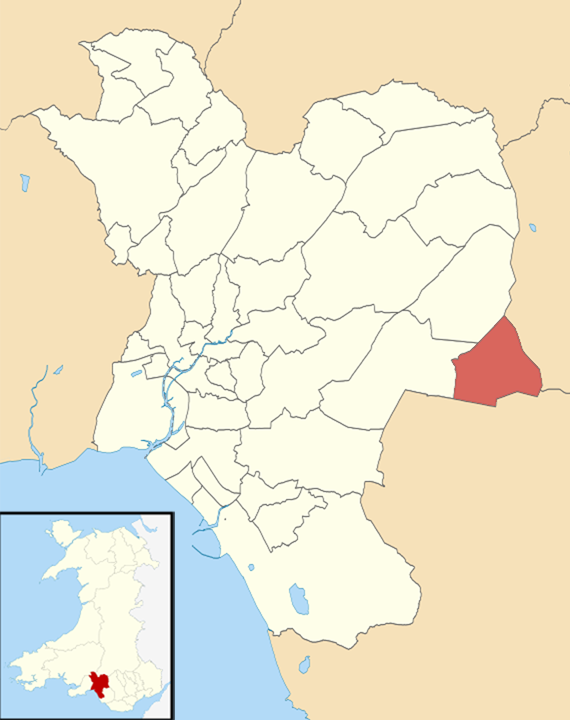
- Location of the Gwynfi ward within Neath Port Talbot County Borough
- Population: 1,362 (2011 census)
- Principal area: Neath Port Talbot
- Preserved county: West Glamorgan
- Country: Wales
- Sovereign state: United Kingdom
- UK Parliament: Aberafan Maesteg
- Senedd Cymru – Welsh Parliament: Aberavon
- Councillors: Jane Jones (Independent)

Gwynfi is an electoral ward of Neath Port Talbot county borough, Wales.

Gwynfi includes the villages if Abergwynfi and Blaengwynfi. Gwynfi is part of the community of Glyncorrwg, the Senedd constituency of Aberavon and the UK constituency of Aberafan Maesteg.

Gwynfi is bounded by the wards of: Glyncorrwg to the northwest; Treherbert of Rhondda Cynon Taff to the east; Blaengarw of Bridgend county borough to the south; and Cymmer to the west. The northern part of the ward is covered in woodland whereas the south of the ward comprises open moorland.

In June 2018, Labour's Ralph Thomas resigned as councillor. On 16 August 2018, a by-election was held, the electorate turnout was 51.3%. Jane Jones was returned to the seat, having previously been councillor until May 2012. The swing in votes was attributed to a threat from the Labour controlled council to close Cymer Afan School. The results were:

Candidate	Party	Votes	Status
Jane Jones	Independent	268	Independent Gain
Katie Jones	Plaid Cymru	73	
Nicola Irwin	Labour	60	
David Joshua	Independent	45	
Jac Paul	Independent	14	
Orla Lowe	Conservative	4	

In the 2017 local council elections, the results were:

Candidate	Party	Votes	Status
Ralph Thomas	Labour	273	Labour hold
Jane Jones	Independent	214	

In the 2012 local council elections, the electorate turnout was 63.84%. The results were:

Candidate	Party	Votes	Status
Ralph Thomas	Labour	502	Labour gain
Jane Jones	Independent	153	
