= Cymmer, Neath Port Talbot =

Coordinates: 51.652°N 3.649°W

Cymmer: Welsh: Cymer
- Location within Neath Port Talbot
- Population: 2,825 (2011 census)
- OS grid reference: SS860961
- Community: Cymer and Glyncorrwg
- Principal area: Neath Port Talbot
- Preserved county: West Glamorgan
- Country: Wales
- Sovereign state: United Kingdom
- Post town: PORT TALBOT
- Postcode district: SA13
- Dialling code: 01639
- Police: South Wales
- Fire: Mid and West Wales
- Ambulance: Welsh
- UK Parliament: Aberafan Maesteg
- Senedd Cymru – Welsh Parliament: Aberavon
- Councillors: Scott Jones (Independent)

Cymmer (Welsh: Cymer) is a small village in the community of Cymer and Glyncorrwg, in Neath Port Talbot in Wales, set on a hillside in the Afan Valley near the confluence of the River Afan and the River Corrwg. In 2001, Cymmer had a population of 2,883.

== Description ==
Cymmer can also be spelled "Cymer", with "Cymmer" being the English-language version, and "Cymer" the Welsh language one. The word "Cymmer" translates from Welsh into English as "joining place of two rivers", and it is here that the Afon Corrwg and the Afon Afan meet, to flow onward as the River Afan until entering the sea at Aberavon/Port Talbot.

The immediate area is set in a densely forested upland area with steep sided river valleys cut through by the Rivers Afan and Corrwg. Patches of open moorland exist to the north and south.

== Social conditions ==
The Cymmer electoral ward was one of the top 10% most deprived wards in Wales according to the 2005 Welsh Index of Multiple Deprivation.

== Amenities ==
Local public houses include The Refreshment Rooms (the preserved Rhondda and Swansea Bay Railway station) and a working men's club called The Coronation Club. Local amenities include a library, a community swimming pool, a sports hall, primary school, a police station and fire station.

== Government and politics ==
Cymmer is also the name of the electoral ward for the immediate area around the village. It elects a county councillor to Neath Port Talbot County Borough Council. The ward includes some or all of the villages of Cymmer, Abercregan, Duffryn and Croeserw in the UK constituency of Aberafan Maesteg. Cymmer is bounded by the wards of Resolven to the north; Glyncorrwg to the northeast; Gwynfi to the east; Blaengarw, Caerau and Maesteg West of Bridgend county borough to the south east; Bryn and Cwmavon to the southwest; and Pelenna to the west.

In the 2008 local council elections, the electorate turnout was 48.23%. The results were:

Candidate	Party	Votes	Status
Scott Jones	Labour	594	Labour gain
David Williams	Ratepayers	463	

Only one nomination was received for the 2012 Local Council Elections, from the sitting councillor Scott Jones. Jones continued to be the councillor of Cymmer without a contest.

In the 2017 local council elections, the results were:

Candidate	Party	Votes	Status
Scott Jones	Labour	673	Labour hold
Jeff Jones	Independent	370	

In July 2018, Councillor Scott Jones resigned the Labour whip. He therefore now sits as an independent.
