= Sandfields East =

- Location within Neath Port Talbot
- Population: 6,895 (2011 census)
- Principal area: Neath Port Talbot
- Preserved county: West Glamorgan
- Country: Wales
- Sovereign state: United Kingdom
- Police: South Wales
- Fire: Mid and West Wales
- Ambulance: Welsh
- UK Parliament: Aberafan Maesteg
- Senedd Cymru – Welsh Parliament: Aberavon
- Councillors: Ted Latham (Labour); Sean Pursey (Labour); Matthew Crowley (Labour)
- List of places UK Wales Neath Port Talbot 51.58770°N 3.80858°W Map of the community

Sandfields East (Welsh: Dwyrain Traethmelyn) is an electoral ward and a community of Neath Port Talbot county borough, Wales. It is part of the Senedd constituency of Aberavon and the UK constituency of Aberafan Maesteg. The ward elects three county councillors to Neath Port Talbot County Borough Council.

== Description ==
The community is coterminous with the electoral ward. Sandfields East is bounded by the wards of Sandfields West to the northwest, Aberavon to the northeast and Margam to the southeast. It is bounded by Swansea Bay to the southwest.

At the 2011 UK Census the population of the community/ward was 6,895.

Sandfields East is a mostly urbanised ward and consists of council housing inland with private homes and old peoples accommodation near the beach area. Neath Port Talbot Hospital is located in the ward.

== County council elections ==
In the 2012 local council elections, the electorate turnout was 40.13%. The councillors who were elected were:

Candidate	Party	Votes	Status
Lella James	Independent	1116	Independent hold
Ted Latham	Labour	1041	Labour hold
Colin Crowley	Labour	879	Labour hold
Pat Jones	Labour	750	
Captain Beany	NPT Independent Party	669	
Len Willis	Independent	622	

Colin Crowly died after the election and a by-election was held to elect a replacement. The by-election took place on Thursday, 17 October 2013. The turnout was 23.2% and the councillor elected was:

Candidate	Party	Votes	Status
Mike Davies	Labour	718	Labour hold
Barry Kirk	Port Talbot Residents Association	222	
Keith Suter	UKIP	154	
Daniel Thomas	Plaid Cymru	69	
Richard Minshull	Conservative	40	

Mike Davies died after the election and a by-election was held to elect a replacement. The by-election took place on Thursday, 30 October 2014. The turnout was 20.72% and the councillor elected was:

Candidate	Party	Votes	Status
Matthew Crowley	Labour	641	Labour hold
Keith Suter	UKIP	361	
Richard Minshull	Conservative	47	

In the 2017 local council elections, the councillors who were elected were:

Candidate	Party	Votes	Status
Ted Latham	Labour	1064	Labour hold
Sean Pursey	Labour	1002	Labour gain
Matthew Crowley	Labour	937	Labour hold
Deborah Bamsey	Plaid Cymru	583	
Captain Beany	Independent	504	
