= Pontardawe (electoral ward) =

Coordinates: 51.72461°N 3.85169°W

Pontardawe ward
- Population: 5,421 (2011 census)
- Principal area: Neath Port Talbot
- Preserved county: West Glamorgan
- Country: Wales
- Sovereign state: United Kingdom
- UK Parliament: Neath
- Senedd Cymru – Welsh Parliament: Neath
- Councillors: Linet Purcell (Plaid Cymru); Anthony John Richards (Plaid Cymru)

Pontardawe is an electoral ward of Neath Port Talbot county borough, Wales. It is a division of the Pontardawe community and falls within the parliamentary constituency of Neath.

The greater part of the geographical area of the ward is made up of mountainous grassland and open moorland with a scattering of farms. However, the majority of the population is concentrated in the town of Pontardawe in the south of the ward.

In clockwise order the ward is bounded

- to the north by the wards of Glanamman (in Carmarthenshire), Gwaun-Cae-Gurwen, and Cwmllynfell
- to the east by the wards of Ystalyfera and Godre'r Graig
- to the southeast by the ward of Rhos
- to the south by the wards of Alltwen and Trebanos
- to the west by the wards of Clydach and Mawr (both in Swansea)

== Local council elections ==
In the 2017 local council elections, the voter turnout was 44%. The results were:

Candidate	Party	Votes	Status
Linet Purcell	Plaid Cymru	992	elected – Plaid Cymru hold
Anthony John Richards	Plaid Cymru	635	elected – Plaid Cymru gain
Vince Hotten	Labour	622	
Mike James	Labour	609	
Sascha Lopez	Conservative	260	
Kieran Davies	Conservative	233	

== Key demographics ==
- The Welsh language is widely used in the ward. Only 46.6% of residents aged over 3 have no knowledge of Welsh.
- There is a high standard of education in the ward. Only 41.6% of residents have no formal qualifications. 17.2% of residents have a higher qualification.
- 12.5% of the working population are senior managers and officials, 12.1% are in professional trades, and 13.3% are in associate professional and technical jobs.
- The top field of employment in Pontardawe is health and social care, with 16% of the population working in this sector.
