= Godre'r Graig =

Coordinates: 51.7461°N 3.8101°W

- Location within Neath Port Talbot
- Population: 1,644 (2011 census)
- OS grid reference: SN751068
- Principal area: Neath Port Talbot
- Preserved county: West Glamorgan
- Country: Wales
- Sovereign state: United Kingdom
- Post town: SWANSEA
- Postcode district: SA9
- Dialling code: 01639
- Police: South Wales
- Fire: Mid and West Wales
- Ambulance: Welsh
- UK Parliament: Neath
- Senedd Cymru – Welsh Parliament: Neath
- Councillors: Rosalyn Davies (Plaid Cymru)

Godre'r Graig is a village and an electoral ward of Neath Port Talbot county borough, Wales.

The village developed alongside the coal workings at the Tarenni Colliery, which closed in 1949.

In 2008 the community came together at a public meeting held in the local primary school regarding the long neglected park. As a result, Godre'r Graig Community Association (GCA) was formed to provide a vehicle for the community to take charge of the park and bring it back into use.

== Electoral ward ==
The electoral ward of Godre'r Graig forms part of the community of Ystalyfera. It includes some or all of the settlements of Godre'r Graig, Cilmaengwyn, and Pantyfynnon in the parliamentary constituency of Neath. The ward consists of a settled belt beside the A4067 road and the River Tawe in the Swansea Valley stretching from south-west to north-east. The north-western part of the ward consists of woodland and pasture. The ward is bounded by the wards of Ystalyfera to the north, Rhos to the south-east, and Pontardawe to the west.

In the 2012 local council elections, the electorate turnout was 43.81%. The results were:

Candidate	Party	Votes	Status
Rosalyn Davies	Plaid Cymru	300	Plaid Cymru hold
Jackie Myers	Labour	286	

In the 2017 local council elections, the electoral turnout was 45%. The results were:

Candidate	Party	Votes	Status
Rosalyn Davies	Plaid Cymru	409	Plaid Cymru hold
Brian Hastie	Labour	185	
Reg Atherton	Independent	69	
