= Sandfields West =

Welsh electoral ward

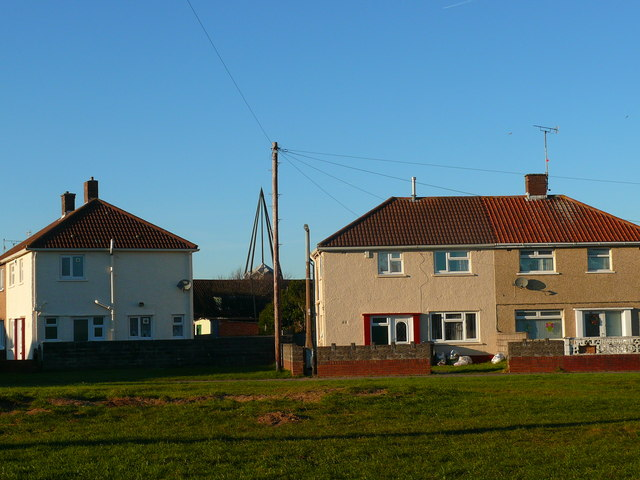

- Location within Neath Port Talbot
- Population: 6,725 (2011 census)
- Principal area: Neath Port Talbot
- Preserved county: West Glamorgan
- Country: Wales
- Sovereign state: United Kingdom
- Police: South Wales
- Fire: Mid and West Wales
- Ambulance: Welsh
- UK Parliament: Aberafan Maesteg
- Senedd Cymru – Welsh Parliament: Aberavon
- Councillors: Suzanne Paddison (Labour); Oliver Davies (Labour); Robert Wood (Labour)
- List of places UK Wales Neath Port Talbot 51.59826°N 3.82344°W Map of the community

Sandfields West (Welsh: Gorllewin Traethmelyn) is an electoral ward and a community of Neath Port Talbot county borough, Wales. It is part of the Senedd constituency of Aberavon and the UK constituency of Aberafan Maesteg. The ward elects three county councillors to Neath Port Talbot County Borough Council.

== Description ==
The community boundaries are coterminous with the electoral ward. Sandfields West is bounded by the wards of Baglan to the northwest, Aberavon to the northeast, and Sandfields East to the southeast.

Sandfields West is a mostly urbanised ward consisting of council housing inland, private housing on the coast and areas of light industry and business park use.

At the 2011 UK Census the population of the ward was 6,725 (with 5,214 of voting age).

== County council elections ==
In the 2012 local council elections, the electorate turnout was 35.47%. The councillors who were elected were:

Candidate	Party	Votes	Status
Andre Chavis	Labour	1173	Labour hold
James Evans	Labour	1088	Labour hold
Susan Paddison	Labour	1078	Labour hold
Keith Suter	NPT Independent Party	377	
Oliver Davies	NPT Independent Party	368	
Joan Target	NPT Independent Party	363	
Olga Jones	Independent	242	
Wayne Morris	Social Democratic Party	219	

In February 2017, Councillor James Evans and Councillor Andre Chavis left the Labour party. They sat as Independent councillors.

In the 2017 local council elections, the councillors who were elected were:

Candidate	Party	Votes	Status
Suzanne Paddison	Labour	851	Labour hold
Oliver Davies	Labour	838	Labour hold
Robert Wood	Labour	749	Labour hold
Andrew Bennison	Plaid Cymru	430	
Audrey Chaves	Independent	395	
Sam Wright	Plaid Cymru	364	
Victoria Griffiths	Plaid Cymru	360	
James Evans	Independent	339	
Taz Taylor	Liberal Democrats	97	
