= Briton Ferry West =

Coordinates: 51.62998°N 3.86517°W

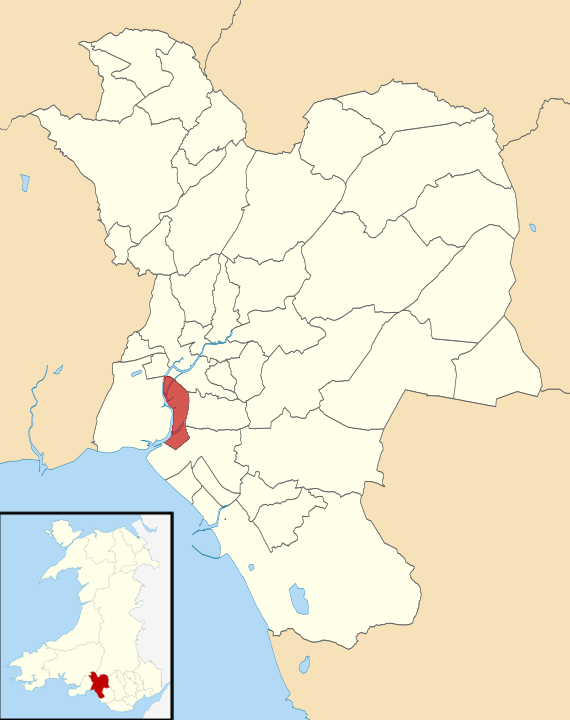
- Location of Briton Ferry West ward within Neath Port Talbot County Borough
- Population: 2,866 (2001 census)
- Principal area: Neath Port Talbot
- Preserved county: West Glamorgan
- Country: Wales
- Sovereign state: United Kingdom
- UK Parliament: Aberafan Maesteg
- Senedd Cymru – Welsh Parliament: Aberavon
- Councillors: Hugh James (Labour)

Briton Ferry West is an electoral ward of Neath Port Talbot county borough, Wales. Briton Ferry West falls within the parish of Briton Ferry.

Briton Ferry West consists of some or all of the districts of Brynhyfryd, Giant's Grave, Shelone and Warren Hill in the Senedd constituency of Aberavon and UK constituency of Aberafan Maesteg. It is bounded by the wards of Coedffranc West to the west; Neath East to the northeast; Briton Ferry East to the east and Baglan to the south. The ward consists of marshland to the northwest, a residential district in the middle and industrial land to the southwest.

== County council elections ==
In the 2008 local council elections, the electorate turnout was 36.55%. The results were:

| Candidate | Party | Votes | Status |
|---|---|---|---|
| Hugh James | Labour | 698 | Labour hold |
| Richard Riddle | Conservative | 116 | |

2012 Local Council Elections

Only one nomination was received for the 2012 Local Council Elections in the ward, the sitting Councillor Hugh James. Cllr James continued to represent the ward with no contest.

2017 Local Council Elections

Only one nomination was received for the 2017 Local Council Elections in the ward, the current Councillor Hugh James. Cllr James continued to represent the ward with no contest.
