= Cimla =

Coordinates: 51.65088°N 3.79375°W

- Location within Neath Port Talbot
- Population: 3,940 (2011 census)
- OS grid reference: SS760962
- Principal area: Neath Port Talbot
- Preserved county: West Glamorgan
- Country: Wales
- Sovereign state: United Kingdom
- Post town: Neath
- Postcode district: SA11
- Dialling code: 01639
- Police: South Wales
- Fire: Mid and West Wales
- Ambulance: Welsh
- UK Parliament: Neath
- Senedd Cymru – Welsh Parliament: Neath
- Councillors: Jeremy Hurley (Independent); Tim Bowen (Independent); Carl Jordan (Independent); Peter Rees (Labour)

Cimla is a village and suburb of the town of Neath in the county borough of Neath Port Talbot, Wales. It is set high up on a hill. It is pronounced Kim-la. The Welsh language spelling is Cymla, pronounced the same way. Its meaning is a place with common land, which it presumably (being land on a hill above previous settlement) was until industrial expansion led to its being covered with housing.

Cimla consists of a residential area in the western central area, which is part of the built-up area of the town of Neath. The residential area is surrounded to the north, east, and south by open moorland. The whole of Cimla is set on high ground. It is home to the Cimla football club, formed in 1985, who play their games on Cefn Saeson playing fields. English is the most spoken language, with Welsh having minimal use. Cimla is Neath’s richest area, with an above average wage per person compared with the rest of the town.

Cefn Saeson (the name of the farm area and secondary school) is said to derive from the fact that this area was once the historic England and Wales border. The name Cefn Saeson translates to “English Ridge”.

There is also rumoured to be a Cimla castle near the Cefn Saeson farm. This is believed due to old Gnoll estate maps from 1812 naming the surrounding field “castle field”.

Singer Kathrine Jenkins was born in Cimla and now resides in London, England.

== Government and politics ==
Cimla is in the parliamentary constituency of Neath.

For elections to Neath Port Talbot County Borough Council, Cimla is covered by the 'Cimla and Pelenna' electoral ward, which also includes the Pelenna community. The ward elects two councillors.

Prior to 2022 Cimla was the name of a county borough ward coterminous with the suburb, within the community of Neath.

In the 2017 local council elections, the Cimla results were:

Candidate	Party	Votes	Status
John Warman	Labour	871	Labour hold
Adam McGarth	Labour	568	Labour hold
Charley Cross	Liberal Democrats	320	

In the 2012 local council elections, the electorate turnout was 36.86%. The Cimla results were:

Candidate	Party	Votes	Status
John Warman	Labour	949	Labour hold
Alan Carter	Labour	706	Labour gain
Des Sparkes	Liberal Democrats	226	
John Williams	Independent	183	

For elections to Neath Town Council, Cimla is covered by the community wards of Cefn Saeson and Crynallt.

== Education ==
Crynallt Primary School is an English-Medium primary school serving Cimla in South Wales. It is located on Afan Valley Road. Crynallt is a feeder school for Cefn Saeson. The school colours are white and royal blue. School starts at ten to nine and finishes at twenty past three. The primary school officially opened in September 2013 after the merging of the Crynallt Infant & Junior Schools.

The local secondary school is Cefn Saeson. Cefn Saeson serves Cimla, Tonna, Tonmawr, Pontrhydyfen, Melin, and parts of Neath. The nearest Welsh-medium secondary school is Ysgol Gyfun Ystalyfera, with the nearest Welsh primary being YGG Castell Nedd. The nearest faith schools are Alderman Davies CiW Primary, St Joseph's RC Primary, and St Joseph's Catholic School & Sixth Form Centre.
