= Pelenna =

- Community
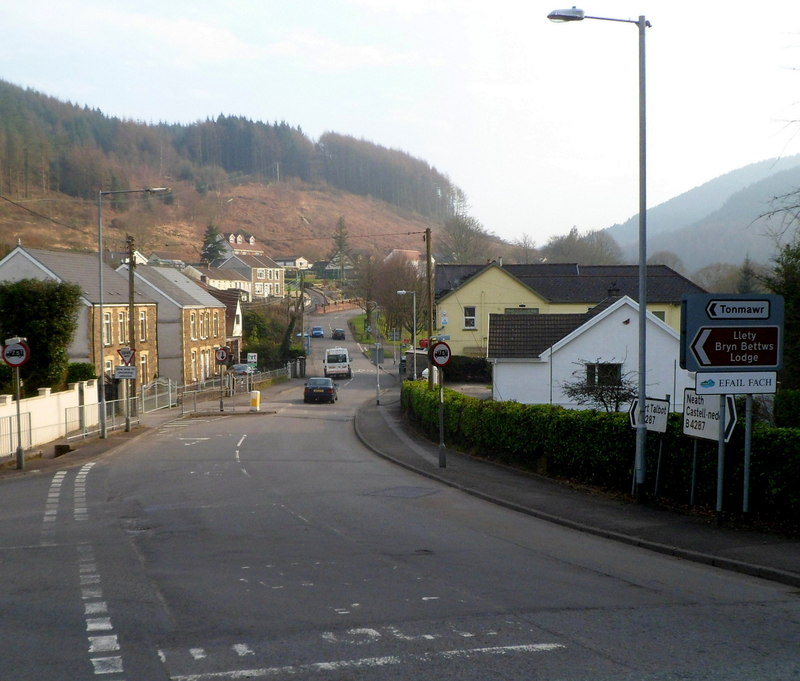
- Efail-fach village

- Location within Neath Port Talbot
- Principal area: Neath Port Talbot
- Country: Wales
- Sovereign state: United Kingdom
- Police: South Wales
- Fire: Mid and West Wales
- Ambulance: Welsh
- List of places UK Wales Neath Port Talbot 51.6517°N 3.73885°W Map of the community

Pelenna is a community (civil parish) in Neath Port Talbot, Wales. It largely covers the valleys of the rivers Pelenna and the Blaenpelenna, to the east of the town of Neath.

The community includes the villages of Efail-fach, Tonmawr and Pontrhydyfen. According to the 2011 UK Census, the population of the Pelenna was 1,152.

The area has a history of mining for coal and iron, though this largely ceased in the 1960s.

The River Pelenna eventually flows into the River Afan at Pontrhydyfen.

== Governance ==
At the lowest tier of local government, Pelenna has a community council comprising 11 councillors.

For elections to Neath Port Talbot County Borough Council, Pelenna has been part of the electoral ward of 'Cimla and Pelenna' which includes the neighbouring village of Cimla. The ward elects one county borough councillor.

== See also ==
- Pelenna (electoral ward)
