= 2004 Neath Port Talbot County Borough Council election =

2004 Welsh local government election

Results of the 2004 Neath Port Talbot County Borough Council election

The third election to Neath Port Talbot County Borough Council was held on 10 June 2004. It was preceded by the 1999 election and followed by the 2008 election. On the same day there were elections to the other 21 local authorities in Wales and community councils in Wales.

== Overview ==
All council seats were up for election. These were the third elections held following local government reorganisation. Labour retained its majority.

Neath and Port Talbot County Borough Council election result 2004
Party	Seats	Gains	Losses	Net gain/loss	Seats %	Votes %	Votes	+/−
Labour								
Conservative								
Liberal Democrats								
Plaid Cymru								
	5							
SDP	2							
Green	0							

== Candidates ==
The number of candidates increased compared with 1999.

== Results by ward ==
=== Aberavon (three seats) ===
Aberavon 2004
Party	Candidate	Votes	%	±%
SDP	Anthony Taylor*	1,018		
SDP	Thomas John Sullivan*	822		
SDP	Jeffrey Dinham*	815		
Labour	Wendy Ann Morris	535		
Labour	Anthony James Taylor	520		
Labour	John Edward Sparks	490		
Turnout		1609	37.5	
SDP hold		Swing		
SDP hold		Swing		
SDP hold		Swing		

=== Aberdulais (one seat) ===
Aberdulais 2004
Party	Candidate	Votes	%	±%
Labour	Elwyn Jones*	471		
Ratepayers	Darren Lee Nichols	272		
Majority				
Turnout		747	46.7	
Labour hold		Swing		

=== Alltwen (one seat) ===
Alltwen 2004
Party	Candidate	Votes	%	±%
Labour	David Lewis*	434		
Plaid Cymru	Robert Gwyn Williams	246		
Green	Justyn Toby Toohill	86		
Majority				
Turnout		770	43.7	
Labour hold		Swing		

=== Baglan (three seats) ===
Baglan 1999
Party	Candidate	Votes	%	±%
Ratepayers	Paul Ernest Evans	1,304		
Ratepayers	Juliet Hopkins	1,100		
Ratepayers	Peter Denis Richards	1,030		
Labour	Margaret Frayne	711		
Labour	John Paul Jenkins	681		
Labour	Andrew Brian Jones	631		
Plaid Cymru	Julian Harris	384		
Independent	Wayne Morris	352		
Green	Dawn Sharon Spence	266		
Turnout		2391	42.7	
Ratepayers hold		Swing		
Ratepayers hold		Swing		
Other parties gain from Labour				

=== Blaengwrach (one seat) ===
Blaengwrach 2004
Party	Candidate	Votes	%	±%
Plaid Cymru	Carolyn Edwards*	436		
Labour	David Clifford Davies	237		
Majority		199		
Turnout		680	44.1	
Plaid Cymru hold		Swing		

=== Briton Ferry East (one seat) ===
Briton Ferry East 2004
Party	Candidate	Votes	%	±%
Labour	Colin Morgan*	unopposed		
Labour hold		Swing		

=== Briton Ferry West (one seat) ===
Briton Ferry West 2004
Party	Candidate	Votes	%	±%
Labour	Hugh Newton James	unopposed		
Labour hold		Swing		

=== Bryn and Cwmavon (three seats) ===
Bryn and Cwmavon 2004
Party	Candidate	Votes	%	±%
Labour	Ivor David Williams	1,297		
Labour	Marian Aerona Lewis	1,276		
Independent	Brinley Roblin	1,123		
Labour	Allan Gwilym Penny	1,014		
Turnout		2,212	43.0	
Labour hold		Swing		
Labour hold		Swing		
Independent gain from Independent Labour		Swing		

=== Bryncoch North (one seat) ===
Bryncoch North 2004
Party	Candidate	Votes	%	±%
Plaid Cymru	John Raymond Bryant	484		
Labour	Richard David Mathews*	359		
Liberal Democrats	Richard David George	95		
Green	Carwen Angharad Bunston	35		
Majority				
Turnout		983	52.3	
Plaid Cymru gain from Labour		Swing		

=== Bryncoch South (two seats) ===
Bryncoch South 2004
Party	Candidate	Votes	%	±%
Plaid Cymru	Janice Dudley	971		
Plaid Cymru	Geraint Degwel Owen	958		
Labour	Patricia Margaret Phillips*	691		
Labour	Elizabeth Vaughan Mathews	664		
Turnout		1,774	40.1	
Plaid Cymru hold		Swing		
Plaid Cymru gain from Labour		Swing		

=== Cadoxton (one seat) ===
Cadoxton 2004
Party	Candidate	Votes	%	±%
Labour	David Valdo Funning*	361		
Liberal Democrats	Thomas Roger Parkinson	255		
Majority		106		
Turnout		626	44.9	
Labour hold		Swing		

=== Cimla (two seats) ===
Cimla 2004
Party	Candidate	Votes	%	±%
Liberal Democrats	John Warman*	859		
Labour	Stephen Richard Williams	362		
Labour	Paul Rees	332		
Ratepayers	David Hewett Morgan	307		
Plaid Cymru	Raymond Douglas Pooley	227		
Green	Miranda Jane La-Vey	155		
Turnout		1,312	39.2	
Liberal Democrats hold		Swing		
Labour hold		Swing		

=== Coedffranc Central (two seats) ===
Coedffranc Central 2004
Party	Candidate	Votes	%	±%
Labour	Arthur Pendry Hodge Davies	604		
Labour	Georgina Emma Davies	449		
Independent	Betsan Powell*	405		
Plaid Cymru	Alyson Jane Thomas	387		
Liberal Democrats	Frank Harvey Little	231		
Turnout		1,174	38.9	
Labour gain from Plaid Cymru		Swing		
Labour gain from Independent		Swing		

=== Coedffranc North (one seat) ===
Coedffranc North 2004
Party	Candidate	Votes	%	±%
Liberal Democrats	David Keith Davies*	506		
Labour	Paul Malcolm Davies	287		
Majority				
Turnout		811	43.3	
Liberal Democrats hold		Swing		

=== Coedffranc West (one seat) ===
Coedffranc West 2004
Party	Candidate	Votes	%	±%
Labour	Henry Marney Bebell*	409		
Respect	Huw Pudner	210		
Green	Katherine Jay Butcher	114		
Majority				
Turnout		743	43.0	
Labour hold		Swing		

=== Crynant (one seat) ===
Crynant 2004
Party	Candidate	Votes	%	±%
Plaid Cymru	William Edward Morgan	378		
Labour	Albert David Lyn Harper*	342		
Majority		36		
Turnout		739	48.4	
Plaid Cymru gain from Labour		Swing		

=== Cwmllynfell (one seat) ===
Cwmllynfell 2004
Party	Candidate	Votes	%	±%
Labour	Clifford Eirion Richards	unopposed		
Labour hold		Swing		

=== Cymmer (one seat) ===
Cymmer 2004
Party	Candidate	Votes	%	±%
Ratepayers	David Lee Williams	506		
Labour	David Thomas Daniel	428		
Majority		78		
Turnout		940	43.6	
Ratepayers gain from Independent				

=== Dyffryn (one seat) ===
Dyffryn 2004
Party	Candidate	Votes	%	±%
Plaid Cymru	David Martyn Peters*	874		
Labour	David Clement Llewelyn	217		
Green	Susan Helen Jay	94		
Majority				
Turnout		1,197	46.7	
Plaid Cymru hold		Swing		

=== Glyncorrwg (one seat) ===
Glyncorrwg 2004
Party	Candidate	Votes	%	±%
Labour	Horace Glyndwr Rawlins*	352		
Ratepayers	Stuart Glanrhyd Ackery	154		
Majority		78		
Turnout		507	56.5	
Labour hold		Swing		

=== Glynneath (two seats) ===
Glynneath 2004
Party	Candidate	Votes	%	±%
Plaid Cymru	John Delwyn Morgan*	747		
Plaid Cymru	Horace Thomas Lewis*	675		
Labour	Eifion Rhys Jenkins	565		
Labour	Jacqueline Joseph	441		
Turnout		1,339	47.7	
Plaid Cymru hold		Swing		
Plaid Cymru hold		Swing		

=== Godre'r Graig (one seat) ===
Godre'rgraig 2004
Party	Candidate	Votes	%	±%
Labour	Jackie Myers*	367		
Plaid Cymru	Rosalyn Davies	191		
Majority				
Turnout		563	47.7	
Labour hold		Swing		

=== Gwaun Cae Gurwen (one seat) ===
Gwaun Cae Gurwen 2004
Party	Candidate	Votes	%	±%
Labour	Lynda Ghislaine Williams	480		
Independent	Richard Rhys Morris	422		
Plaid Cymru	David Gerald Oswald Jones	139		
Majority				
Turnout		1,047	46.0	
Labour gain from Plaid Cymru		Swing		

=== Gwynfi (one seat) ===
Gwynfi 2004
Party	Candidate	Votes	%	±%
Independent	Jane Jones	424		
Labour	Colin Robert Day*	313		
Majority		111		
Turnout		744	67.8	
Independent gain from Labour		Swing		

=== Lower Brynamman (one seat) ===
Lower Brynamman 2004
Party	Candidate	Votes	%	±%
Labour	Arwyn Nigel Woolcock*	424		
Plaid Cymru	Cennydd Rhys Puw	124		
Majority		300		
Turnout		553	51.9	
Labour hold		Swing		

=== Margam (one seat) ===
Margam 2004
Party	Candidate	Votes	%	±%
Ratepayers	Leslie John Davies	504		
Labour	Stanley John Mason*	467		
Majority		37		
Turnout		982	42.3	
Ratepayers gain from Labour				

=== Neath East (three seats) ===
Neath East 2004
Party	Candidate	Votes	%	±%
Labour	Sheila Marlene Penry*	705		
Labour	John Miller	665		
Labour	Sandra Miller*	645		
Ratepayers	Jorge Moura Austin-Eames	489		
Plaid Cymru	David Brian Hopkins	470		
Plaid Cymru	Annette Owen	357		
Plaid Cymru	Breandan Seosamh Dominic Mac Cathail	349		
Green	Rhodri Thomas Williams	245		
Turnout		1,596	34.9	
Labour hold		Swing		
Labour hold		Swing		
Labour hold		Swing		

=== Neath North (two seats) ===
Neath North 2004
Party	Candidate	Votes	%	±%
Labour	Derek Vaughan*	1,128		
Labour	Emmanuel Loaring*	815		
Ratepayers	David Gareth Thomas	640		
Turnout		1,518	47.4	
Labour hold		Swing		
Labour gain from Independent Labour		Swing		

=== Neath South (two seats) ===
Neath South 2004
Party	Candidate	Votes	%	±%
Labour	Malcolm Bernard Gunter*	557		
Labour	Peter Albert Rees*	549		
Ratepayers	Helen Christine Morgan	439		
Ratepayers	John Williams	433		
Liberal Democrats	Richard John Moth	184		
Green	Brian James Robertson	129		
Turnout		1,253	34.0	
Labour hold		Swing		
Labour hold		Swing		

=== Onllwyn (one seat) ===
Onllwyn 2004
Party	Candidate	Votes	%	±%
Labour	Alan Huw Thomas*	317		
Plaid Cymru	Mary Denise Browning	173		
Majority				
Turnout		493	51.1	
Labour hold		Swing		

=== Pelenna (one seat) ===
Pelenna 2004
Party	Candidate	Votes	%	±%
Labour	Malcolm Isaac Jones*	unopposed		
Labour hold		Swing		

=== Pontardawe (two seats) ===
Pontardawe 2004
Party	Candidate	Votes	%	±%
Labour	Michael Lloyd James	700		
Plaid Cymru	Alun Huw Evans	666		
Labour	Martha Christina Mary Lambourne	614		
Plaid Cymru	Robert Lewis Williams*	595		
Green	Robert Lewis	209		
Turnout		1,596	40.1	
Labour gain from Plaid Cymru		Swing		
Plaid Cymru hold		Swing		

=== Port Talbot (three seats) ===
Port Talbot 2004
Party	Candidate	Votes	%	±%
Ratepayers	Pamela Edith Spender*	1,008		
Ratepayers	Andrew James Tutton*	967		
Ratepayers	Dennis Keogh	914		
Labour	Jennifer Margaret Lesley Blood	536		
Labour	Richard Brian Thomas	516		
Labour	Matthew Paul Conde	386	37.5	
Turnout		1,645		
Ratepayers hold		Swing		
Ratepayers hold		Swing		
Ratepayers hold		Swing		

=== Resolven (one seat) ===
Resolven 2004
Party	Candidate	Votes	%	±%
Labour	Desmond William Davies*	729		
Plaid Cymru	Alan Brian Edwards	297		
Majority				
Turnout		1,032	42.5	
Labour hold		Swing		

=== Rhos (one seat) ===
Rhos 2004
Party	Candidate	Votes	%	±%
Labour	Paul Michael Thomas*	369		
Plaid Cymru	Stephen Coombes	234		
Liberal Democrats	Sheila Ramsay Waye	163		
Green	Linda Ann Bunston	82		
Majority		857	41.5	
Turnout				
Labour hold		Swing		

=== Sandfields East (three seats) ===
Sandfields East 2004
Party	Candidate	Votes	%	±%
Independent	Leila Helen James*	1,478		
Labour	Colin Joseph Crowley*	1,010		
Labour	Edward Victor Latham	900		
Labour	Patricia Irene Jones	819		
New Millennium Bean Party	Captain Beany	522		
Turnout		2,179	44.2	
Independent hold		Swing		
Labour hold		Swing		
Labour hold		Swing		

=== Sandfields West (three seats) ===
Sandfields West 2004
Party	Candidate	Votes	%	±%
Labour	Olga Jones*	853		
Labour	Patricia Jane Thomas*	789		
Labour	Leonard William Willis	677		
Ratepayers	Stephen Griffiths	587		
Plaid Cymru	Kelvin Peter Edwards	553		
Plaid Cymru	Wilfred Edward Thomas	518		
Plaid Cymru	Stanley George Davies	447		
Ratepayers	Donald James Gough	423		
Turnout		1,832	36.1	
Labour hold		Swing		
Labour hold		Swing		
Labour hold		Swing		

=== Seven Sisters (one seat) ===
Seven Sisters 2004
Party	Candidate	Votes	%	±%
Labour	Peter Gary Lloyd*	393		
Plaid Cymru	Cynthia Lloyd	324		
Majority		69		
Turnout		721	45.1	
Labour hold		Swing		

=== Taibach (two seats) ===
Taibach 2004
Party	Candidate	Votes	%	±%
Labour	John Rogers*	783		
Ratepayers	Aneurin Simon Lewis	631		
Labour	Clive Owen*	589		
Ratepayers	Scott John Sullivan	548		
Liberal Democrats	Gary Lewis	215		
Liberal Democrats	Robert Tudor Jones	212		
Turnout		1,627	43.6	
Labour hold		Swing		
Ratepayers gain from Labour				

=== Tonna (one seat) ===
Tonna 2004
Party	Candidate	Votes	%	±%
Independent	William David Walters	581		
Ratepayers	Thomas Anthony Phillips	186		
Labour	Kenneth Young	132		
Majority				
Turnout		904	46.3	
Independent gain from Labour		Swing		

=== Trebanos (one seat) ===
Trebanos 2004
Party	Candidate	Votes	%	±%
Labour	Joseph Denzil Edwards	342		
Green	Helen Crawford	105		
Majority		237		
Turnout		454	41.4	
Labour hold		Swing		

=== Ystalyfera (one seat) ===
Ystalyfera 2004
Party	Candidate	Votes	%	±%
Plaid Cymru	Alun Llywelyn*	716		
Labour	William Leslie Rewston	363		
Majority				
Turnout		1,099	45.4	
Plaid Cymru hold		Swing		
