= Neath Port Talbot County Borough Council =

Local government of Neath Port Talbot, Wales

Neath Port Talbot County Borough Council Cyngor Bwrdeistref Sirol Castell-nedd Port Talbot (Welsh)

Type
- Type: Principal council of Neath Port Talbot

History
- Founded: 1 April 1996
- Preceded by: West Glamorgan County Council; Port Talbot; Neath; Lliw Valley (part)

Leadership
- Mayor: Alan Lockyer, Labour since 14 May 2026
- Leader: Scott Jones, Independent since 14 October 2026
- Chief Executive: Frances O’Brien since November 2024

Structure
- Seats: 60 councillors
- Graph of the party split among 60 seats.
- Political groups: Administration (31) Plaid Cymru (11) Independent (20) Other parties (29) Labour (22) Liberal Democrats (3) Green (1) Independent (3)
- Length of term: 5 years

Elections
- Voting system: First-past-the-post
- First election: 4 May 1995
- Last election: 5 May 2022
- Next election: 6 May 2027

Meeting place
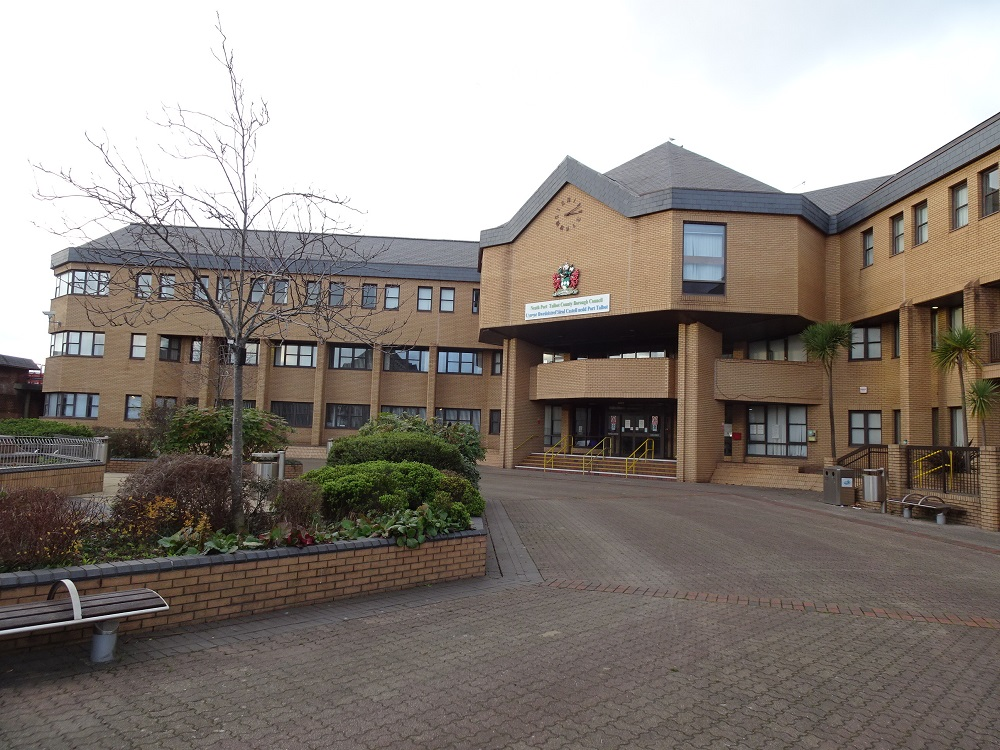
- Civic Centre, Port Talbot, SA13 1PJ

Website
- www.npt.gov.uk

Neath Port Talbot County Borough Council (Welsh: Cyngor Bwrdeistref Sirol Castell-nedd Port Talbot; or simply Neath Port Talbot Council) is the local authority for the county borough of Neath Port Talbot, one of the principal areas of Wales. The council is based at the Civic Centre in Port Talbot. The council was controlled by the Labour Party from its creation in 1996 until 2022, when Plaid Cymru and a group of independent councillors agreed to share power.

== History ==
The county borough and its council were created on 1 April 1996 under the Local Government (Wales) Act 1994. The borough covered the combined area of the two former districts of Port Talbot and Neath, as well as a smaller area from Lliw Valley (the majority of which went to Swansea). The new council also took over county-level responsibilities in the area from the abolished West Glamorgan County Council. The 1994 Act originally specified that the borough should be called "Neath and Port Talbot". The new authority was elected in 1995, but acted as a shadow authority alongside the outgoing county and district councils until the new arrangements took effect the following year. During that time, the shadow authority requested a change of name from "Neath and Port Talbot" to "Neath Port Talbot". The government confirmed the change with effect from 2 April 1996, one day after the new council came into being.

== Political control ==
Since the 2022 election, the council has been under no overall control. On 23 May 2022, it was announced that a coalition between the Plaid Cymru and Independent groups would lead the council. The Liberal Democrats and Green Party members would support the coalition via a confidence and supply agreement. Independent councillor Steve Hunt became the new leader of council, with Plaid Cymru councillor Alun Llewelyn as the new deputy leader.

The first election to the new council was held in 1995, initially operating as a shadow authority before coming into its powers on 1 April 1996. Political control of the council since 1996 has been as follows:

Party in control	Years
Labour	1996–2022
No overall control	2022–present

=== Leadership ===
The role of mayor is largely ceremonial in Neath Port Talbot. Political leadership is instead provided by the leader of the council. The first leader, Noel Crowley, had been the last leader of the old Port Talbot Borough Council. The leaders since 1996 have been:

Councillor	Party	From	To
Noel Crowley	Labour	1 Apr 1996	Jun 2004
Derek Vaughan	Labour	25 Jun 2004	May 2009
Ali Thomas	Labour	15 May 2009	May 2017
Rob Jones	Labour	26 May 2017	6 Mar 2021
Ted Latham	Labour	17 Mar 2021	May 2022
Steve Hunt	Independent	7 Jun 2022	21 Sep 2026
Scott Jones	Independent	14 Oct 2026	

=== Composition ===
Following the 2022 election and subsequent by-elections and changes of allegiance up to September 2026, the composition of the council was:

Party	Councillors
Labour	22
Independent	23
Plaid Cymru	11
Liberal Democrats	3
Green	1
Total	60

As of September 2026, twenty of the independent councillors sit together as the "Independent Group", which forms the council's administration with Plaid Cymru. One independent sits with the Liberal Democrats as the "Coedffranc Liberal & Independent" group, and the other independents do not belong to a group. The next election is due in 2027.

=== Elections ===
Elections take place every five years, electing sixty councillors. The last election was 5 May 2022.

Year	Seats	Labour	Plaid Cymru	Independent	Liberal Democrats	Green	Others	Notes
1995	65	52	3	8	2	0	0	Labour majority control
1999	64	40	10	7	2	0	5	Labour majority control
2004	64	36	10	7	2	0	9	Labour majority control
2008	64	37	11	9	4	0	3	Labour majority control
2012	64	52	8	4	0	0	0	Labour majority control
2017	64	43	15	5	1	0	0	Labour majority control
2022	60	27	12	18	2	1	0	No overall control; Independent / Plaid Cymru coalition

Party with the most elected councillors in bold. Coalition agreements in notes column.

== Premises ==
The council's main offices are at the Civic Centre in Port Talbot, which had been built in 1987 for the former Port Talbot Borough Council. Other offices are located at the New Neath Civic Centre, and The Quays in Baglan Bay.

When created in 1996, the council also inherited the former Neath Civic Centre, which was subsequently demolished in 2008 to make way for a retail development.

== Electoral wards ==
Pre-2022 electoral wards in Neath Port Talbot

Following a 2021 local government boundary review, the number of electoral wards dropped from 42 to 34, with the number of elected councillors reducing from 64 to 60, effective from the 2022 local elections.

Prior to this, the county borough was divided into 42 wards, listed below, returning a total of 64 councillors. Some of these wards are coterminous with communities (parishes) of the same name. There are 19 community councils in the county borough area. The following table lists council wards, communities and associated geographical areas. Communities with a community council are indicated with a '*':

Ward	Communities (Parishes)	Places covered
Aberavon	Aberavon	
Aberdulais	Blaenhonddan* (Aberdulais and Cilfrew wards)	Cilfrew
Allt-Wen	Cilybebyll* (Allt-Wen ward)	Cilhendre, Trebanos
Baglan	Baglan and Baglan Bay	Baglan Moor
Blaengwrach	Blaengwrach* and Glynneath Town* (West Central ward)	Cwmgwrach
Briton Ferry East	Briton Ferry Town* (Craig-y-darren and Cwrt Sart wards)	
Briton Ferry West	Briton Ferry Town* (Brynhyfryd and Shelone Wood wards)	Giant's Grave
Bryn and Cwmavon	Bryn and Cwmafan	Brynbryddan, Pontrhydyfen
Bryncoch North	Blaenhonddan* (Bryn-côch North ward)	
Bryncoch South	Blaenhonddan* (Bryn-côch South ward)	
Cadoxton	Blaenhonddan* (Cadoxton ward)	Cilfrew
Cimla	Neath* Town (Cefn Saeson and Crynallt wards)	Cefn Saeson, Cimla
Coedffranc Central	Coedffranc* (East Central and Central wards)	Skewen, Caewathen
Coedffranc North	Coedffranc* (North ward)	Birchgrove, Moore Town, Longford, Skewen
Coedffranc West	Coedffranc* (West and West Central wards)	Coed Darcy, Crymlyn Bog, Crymlyn Burrows, Pant y Sais, Jersey Marine, Llandarcy, Skewen
Crynant	Crynant*	Tre-Forgan
Cwmllynfell	Cwmllynfell*	Bryn-Melyn, Pen Rhiw-fawr,
Cymmer	Glyncorrwg (Cymmer ward)	
Dyffryn	Dyffryn Clydach*	Bryncoch, Dyffryn, Longford, Neath Abbey, White Gates
Glyncorrwg	Glyncorrwg (Glyncorrwg ward)	
Glynneath	Glynneath Town* (East, Central and West wards)	Blaengwrach, Cwmgwrach, Morfa Glas, Rheola
Godre'r Graig	Ystalyfera* (Godre’r graig ward)	Cilmaengwyn
Gwaun-Cae-Gurwen	Gwaun-Cae-Gurwen* (Cwmgors and Gwaun-Cae-Gurwen wards)	Cwmgors, Gwaun Laision.
Gwynfi	Glyncorrwg (Gwynfi ward)	Abergwynfi, Blaengwynfi
Lower Brynamman	Gwaun-Cae-Gurwen* (Lower Brynamman and Tai’r Gwaith wards)	Tairgwaith
Margam and Taibach	Margam and Margam Moors	Margam, Taibach, Coed Hirwaun & Goytre
Neath East	Neath Town* (Melyncrythan and Penrhiwtyn wards)	Melincryddan, Pencaerau, Penrhiwtyn
Neath North	Neath Town* (Castle and Llantwit wards)	Llantwit
Neath South	Neath Town* (Gnoll and Mount Pleasant wards)	Cimla, Mount Pleasant
Onllwyn	Onllwyn*	Banwen, Dynffyn Cellwen
Pelenna	Pelenna*	Pontrhydyfen, Tonmawr
Pontardawe	Pontardawe Town* (Pontardawe and Rhyd-y-fro wards)	Rhyd-y-fro, Ynysmeudwy
Port Talbot	Port Talbot	Cirrinau, Cwm Dyffryn, Mynydd Emroch, Pen y Cae, Velindre
Resolven	Clyne and Resolven*	
Rhos	Cilybebyll* (Gellinudd and Rhos wards)	Cilmaengwyn, Gellinudd
Sandfields East	Sandfields East	
Sandfields West	Sandfields West	
Seven Sisters	Seven Sisters*	Bryndulais, Tynewydd
Tonna	Tonna*	
Trebanos	Pontardawe Town* (Trebanos ward)	Craig Trebanos, Pontardawe
Ystalyfera	Ystalyfera* (Ystalyfera ward)	Gurnos

== Council Interests ==
The Neath Port Talbot County Borough Council administrates or jointly controls a number of business interests, which include:

- Afan Forest Park
- Margam Country Park

== Arms ==
Coat of arms of Neath Port Talbot County Borough Council

Notes
Granted 10 May 1997 by the College of Arms.
Crest
Issuant from a mural crown Sable a demi Cistercian monk habited Proper holding aloft in the dexter hand a clarion Vert.
Escutcheon
Per chevron Vert and Argent per chevron removed to the dexter and per chevron removed to the sinister all counterchanged in dexter chief a plate charged with an annulet embattled on the outer edge Sable.
Supporters
On either side a dragon Gules mutually gorged Argent and holding in the exterior claws by a cord with twists alternately Argent and Vert a pine cone also Vert dimidiating a goutte Sable.
Motto
Llwyddo Drwy Ymdrech
Badge
Within a mascle gobonny Argent and Gules suspended from a cord with a loop passing over and behind the apex twisted alternately Argent and Vert a pine cone also Vert dimidiating a goutte Sable.
