= 2022 Neath Port Talbot County Borough Council election =

2022 Welsh local government election

2022 Neath Port Talbot Council election
- 5 May 2022

All 60 seats to Neath Port Talbot County Borough Council 30 seats needed for a majority

	First party	Second party	Third party
Party	Labour	Independent	Plaid Cymru
Seats won	27	18	12
Seat change	▼13	▲11	▼4
	Fourth party	Fifth party
Party	Liberal Democrats	Green
Seats won	2	1
Seat change	▲1	▲1

The 2022 election to Neath Port Talbot County Borough Council was held on 5 May 2022 as part of wider local elections across Wales. The election was preceded by the 2017 election. Three candidates (from the sixty seats available) were elected unopposed.

== Ward changes ==
Changes took place at this election as a result of a ward review and recommendations by the Local Democracy and Boundary Commission for Wales. The number of wards were reduced from 42 to 34, resulting in the number of councillors reducing from 64 to 60. 16 wards saw no change at all.

== Ward results ==
Nominations closed on 4 April 2022.

The following results were announced following the elections. In the case of wards electing more than one councillor the percentage figures reflect the number of ballot papers issued rather than the total number of votes.

* denotes sitting councillor prior to the election

=== Aberavon (two seats) ===
Aberavon 2022
Party	Candidate	Votes	%	±%
Labour	Stephanie Lynch*	707	42.9	
Plaid Cymru	Andrew Dacey	678	41.1	
Plaid Cymru	Nigel Hunt*	637	38.7	
Labour	Dean Thomas	608	36.9	
Independent	Ceri P. Golding	245	14.9	
Conservative	Ieuan Bounds	120	7.3	
Turnout		1,655	39	−1.0
Plaid Cymru hold		Swing		
Labour hold		Swing		

=== Aberdulais (one seat) ===
Aberdulais 2022
Party	Candidate	Votes	%	±%
Independent	Caroline Lewis	373	50.4	
Labour	Ricky Price	263	35.5	
Plaid Cymru	Lee Bromham-Nichols	104	14.1	
Majority		110		
Turnout		743	41	−3.6
Independent gain from Labour		Swing		

=== Alltwen (one seat) ===
Alltwen 2022
Party	Candidate	Votes	%	±%
Plaid Cymru	Nia Jenkins	459	53.6	
Labour	Christopher Jones*	398	46.4	
Majority		61		
Turnout		871	41	−1.9
Plaid Cymru gain from Labour		Swing		

=== Baglan (three seats) ===
Baglan 2022
Party	Candidate	Votes	%	±%
Labour	Peter Richards*	1,390	69.1	
Labour	Carol Clement-Williams*	1,079	53.6	
Labour	Susanne Renkes*	910	45.2	
Independent	John Davies	781	38.8	
Conservative	Liz Hill O'Shea	386	19.2	
Turnout		2,015	37	+0.5
Labour hold		Swing		
Labour hold		Swing		
Labour hold		Swing		

=== Blaengwrach and Glynneath West (one seat) ===
Blaengwrach and Glynneath West 2022
Party	Candidate	Votes	%	±%
Independent	Hayley Davies	498	59.0	
Plaid Cymru	Carol Edwards*	311	36.8	
TUSC	Rhys Davies	35	4.1	
Majority		187		
Turnout		858	37	
Independent gain from Plaid Cymru		Swing		

=== Briton Ferry East (one seat) ===
Chris James was elected as a Labour candidate in 2017.

Briton Ferry East 2022
Party	Candidate	Votes	%	±%
Independent	Chris James*	351	44.6	
Labour	Gareth Rice	349	44.3	
Plaid Cymru	Lindsay Gwilym Barnett	87	11.1	
Majority		2		
Turnout		796	35	+0.7
Independent gain from Labour		Swing		

=== Briton Ferry West (one seat) ===
Briton Ferry West 2022
Party	Candidate	Votes	%	±%
Independent	Kirsty Morris	323	49.5	
Labour	Sarah Davies	257	39.4	
Plaid Cymru	Delyth Barnett	72	11.0	
Majority		66		
Turnout		655	31	
Independent gain from Labour		Swing		

=== Bryn and Cwmavon (three seats) ===
Bryn and Cwmavon 2022
Party	Candidate	Votes	%	±%
Labour	Charlotte Galsworthy*	1,620	77.3	
Labour	Rhidian Mizen*	1,156	55.2	
Labour	Dave Whitelock*	940	44.8	
Independent	Myra Mizen	752	35.9	
Turnout		2,110	39	−2.6
Labour hold		Swing		
Labour hold		Swing		
Labour hold		Swing		

=== Bryncoch North (one seat) ===
Bryncoch North 2022
Party	Candidate	Votes	%	±%
Plaid Cymru	Wyndham Fryer Griffiths*	528	57.0	
Labour	Kate Elkins	284	30.6	
Conservative	Andrea Moignard	115	12.4	
Majority		244		
Turnout		928	51	+2.9
Plaid Cymru hold		Swing		

=== Bryncoch South (two seats) ===
Bryncoch South 2022
Party	Candidate	Votes	%	±%
Plaid Cymru	Chris Williams*	992	60.8	
Plaid Cymru	Jo Hale*	930	57.0	
Labour	Jim Harle	689	42.2	
Turnout		1,646	38	−2.3
Plaid Cymru hold		Swing		
Plaid Cymru hold		Swing		

=== Cadoxton (one seat) ===
Cadoxton 2012
Party	Candidate	Votes	%	±%
Independent	Phil Rogers	388	51.5	
Labour	Sarah Mitchell	237	31.5	
Plaid Cymru	Alex Broom	98	13.0	
Conservative	Barry Arnold	30	4.0	
Majority		151		
Turnout		755	54	+5.6
Independent gain from Labour		Swing		

=== Cimla and Pelenna (two seats) ===
Cimla and Pelenna 2022
Party	Candidate	Votes	%	±%
Independent	Jeremy Hurley*	1,100	63.6	
Independent	Tim Bowen	845	48.9	
Labour	John Warman*	836	48.4	
Labour	Al Musaeid	362	20.9	
Turnout		1,732	42	+7.0
Independent hold		Swing		
Independent gain from Labour		Swing		

=== Coedffranc Central (two seats) ===
Coedffranc Central 2022
Party	Candidate	Votes	%	±%
Green	Nathan Goldup-John	552	46.3	
Labour	Angharad Aubrey*	516	43.3	
Labour	Annette Wingrave	478	40.1	
Green	Bethany Payne	395	33.1	
Independent	David Richards	134	11.2	
Liberal Democrats	Frank Little	108	9.1	
Turnout		1,203	33	−2.6
Green gain from Labour		Swing		
Labour hold		Swing		

=== Coedffranc North (one seat) ===
Coedffranc North 2022
Party	Candidate	Votes	%	±%
Labour	Mike Harvey*	455	62.2	
Independent	Nicola Evans	276	37.8	
Majority		179		
Turnout		736	40	−2.6
Labour hold		Swing		

=== Coedffranc West (two seats) ===
Coedffranc West 2022
Party	Candidate	Votes	%	±%
Liberal Democrats	Helen Ceri Clarke*	803	83.6	
Liberal Democrats	Cen Phillips	548	57.1	
Labour	Kris Langford	242	25.2	
Conservative	Matthew Williams	107	11.1	
Turnout		964	32	−4.7
Liberal Democrats hold		Swing		
Liberal Democrats hold		Swing		

=== Crynant, Onllwyn and Seven Sisters (two seats) ===
Crynant, Onllwyn and Seven Sisters 2022
Party	Candidate	Votes	%	±%
Independent	Steve Hunt*	1,316	64.5	
Independent	Sian Harris*	1,195	58.6	
Labour	Dean Cawsey	896	43.9	
Green	Lowri Bennett	182	8.9	
Turnout		2,042	50	
Independent hold		Swing		
Independent hold		Swing		

=== Cwmllynfell and Ystalyfera (two seats) ===
Cwmllynfell and Ystalyfera 2022
Party	Candidate	Votes	%	±%
Plaid Cymru	Alun Llewelyn*	763	63.6	
Labour	Cathy James	583	48.6	
Plaid Cymru	Hugh Jones*	560	46.7	
Turnout		1,217	38	
Plaid Cymru hold		Swing		
Labour gain from Plaid Cymru		Swing		

=== Cymmer and Glyncorrwg (one seat) ===
Cymmer and Glyncorrwg 2022
Party	Candidate	Votes	%	±%
Independent	Jeff Jones	412	45.0	
Independent	Nicola-Jayne Davies*	284	31.0	
Independent	Joshua Slater	219	23.9	
Majority		128		
Turnout		917	52	+0.6
Independent gain from Independent		Swing		

=== Dyffryn (two seats) ===
Dyffryn 2022
Party	Candidate	Votes	%	±%
Independent	David Martyn Peters*	862	71.5	
Independent	James Henton	427	35.4	
Independent	Keith Davies	362	30.0	
Labour	Keith Finn	289	24.0	
Independent	Joe Baugh	246	20.4	
Turnout		1,213	41	
Independent hold		Swing		
Independent hold		Swing		

=== Glynneath Central and East (one seat) ===
Glynneath Central and East 2022
Party	Candidate	Votes	%	±%
Independent	Simon Anthony Knoyle*	547	59.0	
Plaid Cymru	John Blower	209	22.5	
Independent	David Richards	171	18.4	
Majority		338		
Turnout		938	50	
Independent hold		Swing		

=== Godre'r Graig (one seat) ===
Godre'r Graig 2022
Party	Candidate	Votes	%	±%
Plaid Cymru	Rosalyn Davies*	387	67.2	
Labour	Will Lord	162	28.1	
Green	Ruth Battye	27	4.7	
Majority		225		
Turnout		581	36	−8.0
Plaid Cymru hold		Swing		

=== Gwaun Cae Gurwen and Lower Brynaman (two seats) ===
Gwaun Cae Gurwen and Lower Brynaman 2022
Party	Candidate	Votes	%	±%
Labour	Sonia Helen Reynolds*			
Labour	Sarah Thomas			
Majority				
Turnout				
Labour hold		Swing	unopposed	
Labour hold		Swing	unopposed	

=== Gwynfi and Croeserw (one seat) ===
Scott Jones was elected as a Labour candidate in 2017.

Gwynfi and Croeserw 2022
Party	Candidate	Votes	%	±%
Independent	Scott Jones*			
Majority				
Turnout				
Independent gain from Labour		Swing	unopposed	

=== Margam and Taibach (three seats) ===
Margam and Taibach 2022
Party	Candidate	Votes	%	±%
Labour	Robert Jones*	1,166	48.7	
Labour	Laura Williams	1,077	45.0	
Labour	Dennis Keogh	982	41.0	
Plaid Cymru	Colin Deere	873	36.5	
Plaid Cymru	Stephen Bevan	868	36.3	
Plaid Cymru	Wayne White	534	22.3	
Independent	John Bamsey	532	22.2	
Conservative	Anthony Hill O'Shea	236	9.9	
Turnout		2,401	39	
Labour hold		Swing		
Labour hold		Swing		
Labour hold		Swing		

Jones was the former councillor for the Margam ward, which was merged with Tai-bach in 2022. Keogh was formerly the councillor for Port Talbot

=== Neath East (three seats) ===
Neath East 2022
Party	Candidate	Votes	%	±%
Plaid Cymru	Dan Thomas	482	38.9	
Labour	Sheila Penry*	463	37.4	
Independent	Wayne Carpenter	452	36.5	
Labour	Sandra Miller*	427	34.5	
Plaid Cymru	Thomas Cooze	418	33.7	
Labour	John Miller*	418	33.7	
Plaid Cymru	Breandan Mac Cathail	371	29.9	
Turnout		1,251	27	
Plaid Cymru gain from Labour		Swing		
Labour hold		Swing		
Independent gain from Labour		Swing		

=== Neath North (two seats) ===
Neath North 2022
Party	Candidate	Votes	%	±%
Labour	Alan Lockyer*	518	47.8	
Independent	Andy Lodwig	474	43.7	
Labour	Sian James	402	37.1	
Green	Jan Dowden	321	29.6	
Turnout		1,104	36	
Labour hold		Swing		
Independent gain from Labour		Swing		

=== Neath South (two seats) ===
Neath South 2022
Party	Candidate	Votes	%	±%
Independent	Carl Jordan	557	40.9	
Labour	Peter Rees*	520	38.2	
Plaid Cymru	Megan Poppy Lloyd	427	31.4	
Labour	Rose Widlake	402	29.5	
Independent	Adam McGrath	316	23.2	
Plaid Cymru	Jonnie Fishlock	254	18.6	
Turnout		1,366	36	
Independent gain from Plaid Cymru		Swing		
Labour hold		Swing		

=== Pontardawe (two seats) ===
Pontardawe 2022
Party	Candidate	Votes	%	±%
Plaid Cymru	Anthony Richards*	783	49.9	
Plaid Cymru	Charles Davies	781	49.8	
Labour	Meirion Davies	732	46.7	
Labour	Jill Lord	650	41.4	
Turnout		1,599	38	
Plaid Cymru hold		Swing		
Plaid Cymru hold		Swing		

=== Port Talbot (two seats) ===
Due to the death of a candidate, the Port Talbot ward election was postponed until 23 June 2022.

Port Talbot 2022
Party	Candidate	Votes	%	±%
Labour	Saifur Rahaman*	914	60.2	
Labour	Sharon Freeguard*	898	59.2	
Plaid Cymru	Nigel Hunt	367	24.2	
Independent	John Davies	246	16.2	
Plaid Cymru	Melissa Stanford-Roberts	244	16.1	
Independent	Kimberly Isherwood	171	11.3	
Green	Bethany Payne	46	3.0	
Green	Jan Dowden	25	1.6	
Turnout		1,519	33	
Registered electors		4,608		
Labour hold		Swing		
Labour hold		Swing		

=== Resolven and Tonna (two seats) ===
Resolven and Tonna 2022
Party	Candidate	Votes	%	±%
Labour	Leanne Jones*	914	45.9	
Independent	Dean Lewis*	842	42.3	
Independent	Matty Young	737	37.0	
Labour	Neil Francis	702	35.2	
Plaid Cymru	Andrew Clarke	287	14.4	
Plaid Cymru	Paul Sambrook	238	11.9	
Turnout		2,001	44	
Labour hold		Swing		
Independent hold		Swing		

=== Rhos (one seat) ===
Rhos 2022
Party	Candidate	Votes	%	±%
Plaid Cymru	Marcia Spooner*	486	54.7	
Labour	Noel Thomas	403	45.3	
Majority		83		
Turnout		909	43	
Plaid Cymru hold		Swing		

=== Sandfields East (three seats) ===
Sandfields East 2022
Party	Candidate	Votes	%	±%
Labour	Sean Pursey*	1,331	71.6	
Labour	Edward Latham*	1,057	56.9	
Labour	Matthew Crowley*	1,006	54.1	
Plaid Cymru	Cassius Walker-Hunt	583	31.4	
Plaid Cymru	Deborah Bamsey	556	29.9	
Green	Kevin Sprules	260	14.0	
Turnout		1,864	36	
Labour hold		Swing		
Labour hold		Swing		
Labour hold		Swing		

=== Sandfields West (three seats) ===
Sandfields West 2022
Party	Candidate	Votes	%	±%
Labour	Suzanne Paddison*	837	59.4	
Labour	Oliver Davies*	815	57.8	
Labour	Robert Wood*	741	52.6	
Plaid Cymru	Andrew Bennison	602	42.7	
Plaid Cymru	Ethan Wheatley	446	31.7	
Turnout		1,422	28	
Labour hold		Swing		
Labour hold		Swing		
Labour hold		Swing		

=== Trebanos (one seat) ===
Trebanos 2022
Party	Candidate	Votes	%	±%
Plaid Cymru	Rebeca Phillips*	445	69.4	
Labour	Glenn Thomas	196	30.6	
Majority		249		
Turnout		647	46	
Plaid Cymru hold		Swing		

== Aftermath ==
The Independent Group and Plaid Cymru agreed a deal to take control of the council, ending 26 years of Labour dominance.

== By-Elections 2022-2027 ==
=== Briton Ferry East by-election 2024 ===
A by-election was held in Briton Ferry East on 15 February 2024 following the resignation of Independent councillor, Chris James.

Briton Ferry East by-election 2024
Party	Candidate	Votes	%	±%
Labour	Gareth Rice	287	52.4	+8.1
Independent	Kris Pemberton	234	42.7	N/A
Green	Stephanie Woodhouse	27	4.9	N/A
Majority		53	9.7	
Turnout		553	23	
Labour gain from Independent		Swing		

=== Rhos by-election 2024 ===
A by-election was held in Rhos on 15 February 2024 following the death of Plaid Cymru councillor, Marcia Spooner.

Rhos by-election 2024
Party	Candidate	Votes	%	±%
Independent	Bob Woolford	494	52.1	N/A
Plaid Cymru	Matty Vincent	242	25.5	−29.2
Labour	Noel Davies	137	14.5	−30.8
Liberal Democrats	Susan Helen Jay	60	6.3	N/A
Green	Kathy Oakwood	15	1.6	N/A
Majority		252	26.6	
Turnout		949	44	
Independent gain from Plaid Cymru		Swing		

=== Neath East by-election 2024 ===
A by-election was held in Neath East on 28 March 2024 following the death of Labour councillor, Shelia Penry.

Neath East by-election 2024
Party	Candidate	Votes	%	±%
Labour	Lauren Heard	409	43.8	+6.4
Independent	Keith Finn	247	26.4	N/A
Plaid Cymru	Megan Poppy Lloyd	157	16.8	−16.9
Green	Sylwia Harris	121	13.0	N/A
Majority		162	17.4	
Turnout		934	19	
Labour hold		Swing		

=== Cwmllynfell and Ystalyfera by-election 2025 ===
A by-election was held in Cwmllynfell and Ystalyfera on 3 April 2025 following the resignation of Labour councillor, Cathy James.

Cwmllynfell and Ystalyfera by-election 2025
Party	Candidate	Votes	%	±%
Liberal Democrats	Susan Grounds	383	34.0	N/A
Plaid Cymru	Brandon Havard	340	30.2	−16.5
Reform	Cameron Richards	150	13.3	N/A
Labour	Heledd Owen	143	12.7	−35.9
Independent	Mathew Scarll	98	8.7	N/A
Conservative	Lee Stabbins	12	1.1	N/A
Majority		43		
Turnout		1,126	34	
Liberal Democrats gain from Labour		Swing		

=== Baglan by-election 2025 ===
A by-election was held in Baglan on 17 July 2025 following the death of Labour councillor, Peter Richards.

Baglan by-election 2025
Party	Candidate	Votes	%	±%
Labour	Josh Tuck	708	37.5	−16.8
Independent	Wendy Blethyn	532	28.2	N/A
Reform	John Bamsey	447	23.7	N/A
Plaid Cymru	Colin Deere	149	7.9	N/A
Conservative	Lee Stabbins	19	1.0	−14.1
Green	Nigel Hill	18	1.0	N/A
Liberal Democrats	Tomos Roberts-Young	13	0.7	N/A
Majority		176		
Turnout		1,889	34	
Labour hold		Swing		

=== Trebanos by-election 2026 ===
A by-election was held in Trebanos on 9 July 2026 following the resignation of Plaid Cymru councillor, Rebeca Phillips, after her election to the Senedd.

Trebanos by-election 2026
Party	Candidate	Votes	%	±%
Plaid Cymru	Jamie Watkins	223	51.1	−18.3
Reform	Graeme Kerrison	88	20.2	N/A
Liberal Democrats	Hayley Davies	77	17.7	N/A
Labour	Stephanie Everitt	37	8.5	−22.1
Conservative	Liz O'Shea	7	1.6	N/A
Green	Griff Miller	4	0.9	N/A
Majority		135		
Turnout		437	31	
Plaid Cymru hold		Swing		
