= Pelenna (electoral ward) =

Coordinates: 51.65170°N 3.73885°W

- Population: 1,152 (2011 census)
- Principal area: Neath Port Talbot
- Preserved county: West Glamorgan
- Country: Wales
- Sovereign state: United Kingdom
- UK Parliament: Neath
- Senedd Cymru – Welsh Parliament: Neath

Pelenna was an electoral ward coterminous with the Pelenna community in Neath Port Talbot county borough, south Wales. The ward consisted of some or all of the following areas: Cefn-Saeson, Tonmawr, Pontrhydyfen in the parliamentary constituency of Neath.

Pelenna was bounded by the wards of: Resolven to the north; Cymmer to the east; Bryn and Cwmavon to the south; Briton Ferry East and Cimla to the west; and Tonna to the northwest. The ward comprises open moorland to the north west and dense woodland to the south east with the largest settlements in Tonmawr and Pontrhydyfen.

Following a 2020 boundary review by the Local Democracy and Boundary Commission for Wales, Pelenna was merged with the neighbouring Cimla ward to become 'Cimla and Pelenna', effective from the 2022 local elections.

== Local election results ==
In the 2017 local council elections, the electorate turnout for Pelenna was %. The results were:

Candidate	Party	Votes	Status
Martin Ellis	Independent	133	Independent hold
Hywel Miles	Plaid Cymru	132	
Peter Hughes	Independent	114	
Andrew Jones	Labour	90	

In 2019, the sitting Councillor, Martin Ellis, died. On 20 June 2019, a by-election was held. The results were:

Candidate	Party	Votes	Status
Jeremy Hurley	Independent	251	Independent hold
Hywel Miles	Plaid Cymru	120	
Peter Hughes	Independent	105	
Andrew Jones	Labour	43	
Frank Little	Liberal Democrats	6	
