= Cadoxton (electoral ward) =

Electoral ward of Neath Port Talbot, Wales

Coordinates: 51.67332°N 3.79609°W

- Population: 1,684 (2011)
- Principal area: Neath Port Talbot
- Preserved county: West Glamorgan
- Country: Wales
- Sovereign state: United Kingdom
- UK Parliament: Neath
- Senedd Cymru – Welsh Parliament: Neath
- Councillors: Annette Wingrave (Labour)

Cadoxton is an electoral ward of Neath Port Talbot county borough, Wales. It forms part of the parish of Blaenhonddan.

Cadoxton consists of some or all of the settlements of Cadoxton-juxta-Neath and Cilfrew in the parliamentary constituency of Neath. The ward consists of a built up area and a strip of woodland to the south with areas of pasture in the central and northern areas.

Cadoxton is bounded by the wards of Rhos and Crynant to the north; Aberdulais and Tonna to the east; Neath North to the south; and Bryncoch South and Bryncoch North to the west.

== Election results ==
In the 2012 local council elections, the electorate turnout was 35.67%. The results were:

Candidate	Party	Votes	Status
Annette Wingrave	Labour	296	Labour gain
Frank Little	Liberal Democrats	185	

In the 2017 local council elections, the results were:

Candidate	Party	Votes	Status
Annette Wingrave	Labour	253	Labour hold
Joanna Hale	Plaid Cymru	198	
Peter Crocker-Jaques	Conservative	82	
Robert King	Independent	65	
Sheila Kingston-Jones	Liberal Democrats	46	
