= Lawrence Williams (cricketer) =

Welsh cricketer (1946–2023)

Personal information
- Full name: David Lawrence Williams
- Born: 20 November 1946; Tonna, Neath, Glamorgan, Wales
- Died: 26 May 2023 (aged 76); Ynysygerwn, Neath Port Talbot, Wales
- Batting: Left-handed
- Bowling: Right-arm fast-medium

Domestic team information
- Years: Team
- 1969 to 1977: Glamorgan

Career statistics
Competition	First-class	List A
Matches	151	138
Runs scored	403	103
Batting average	5.52	3.96
100s/50s	0/0	0/0
Top score	37*	10
Balls bowled	21,358	5,884
Wickets	364	194
Bowling average	27.15	19.15
5 wickets in innings	13	3
10 wickets in match	2	–
Best bowling	7/60	5/30
Catches/stumpings	38/–	14/–
- Source: Cricinfo, 28 May 2023

David Lawrence Williams (20 November 1946 – 26 May 2023) was a Welsh cricketer who played for Glamorgan from 1969 to 1977. In his first season, he took 52 Championship wickets at 21.36 to help them win only their second title.

Williams was born in Neath on 20 November 1946. He appeared in 151 first-class matches as a right-arm fast-medium pace bowler and left-handed batsman. He took 364 wickets with a best performance of seven for 60 against Lancashire at Blackpool in 1970, and scored 403 runs with a highest score of 37 not out.

Williams died in Ynysygerwn, Neath Port Talbot on 26 May 2023, at the age of 76.
