= Cadoxton =

Cadoxton may refer to:

- Cadoxton, Vale of Glamorgan, a district of the town of Barry in South Wales
- Cadoxton (electoral ward), Wales, covering the Cadoxton-juxta-Neath area
- Cadoxton-juxta-Neath, a village in Neath Port Talbot, Wales
