= Tonna, Neath =

Tonna: Welsh: Tonnau
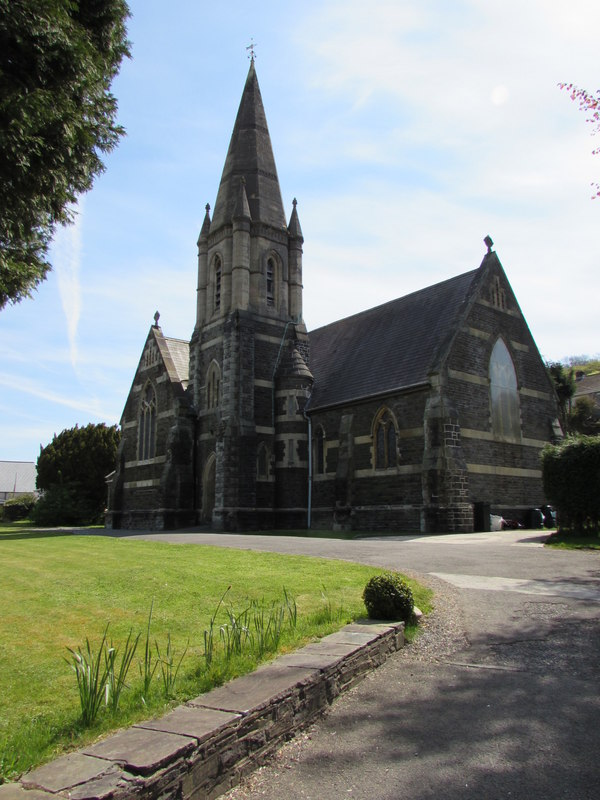
- St Anne's Church in Tonna.

- Location within Neath Port Talbot
- Population: 2,499 (2011 census)
- OS grid reference: SS774990
- Principal area: Neath Port Talbot
- Preserved county: West Glamorgan
- Country: Wales
- Sovereign state: United Kingdom
- Post town: NEATH
- Postcode district: SA11
- Dialling code: 01639
- Police: South Wales
- Fire: Mid and West Wales
- Ambulance: Welsh
- UK Parliament: Neath and Swansea East
- Senedd Cymru – Welsh Parliament: Neath
- Councillors: Leanne Jones (Labour)
- List of places UK Wales Neath Port Talbot 51.676°N 3.772°W Map of the community

Tonna (Welsh: Tonnau) is the name of a village and community in Neath Port Talbot, Wales, located to the north-east of Neath.

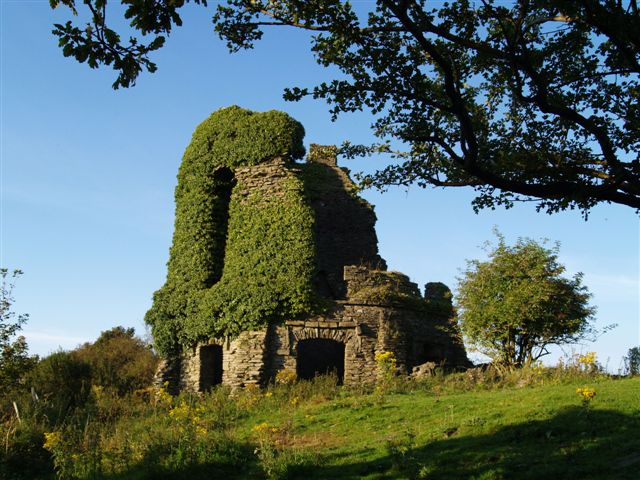
Ivy Tower

Immediately between Tonna and the adjoining parish of Llanilltud ("Llantwit-juxta-Neath") is a cottage once occupied by the Welsh-born engineer and naturalist Alfred Russel Wallace, who had arrived at his theory of evolution independently of Charles Darwin, with whom he later corresponded. Eventually Wallace and Darwin jointly presented the first paper on Natural Selection to the Linnean Society.

The village's rugby union team is Tonna RFC.

== Toponymy ==
Once mainly agricultural fields, the name derives from the archaic Welsh tonnau, meaning lea or grassland and not, as is sometimes assumed, the modern Welsh for "waves". Some areas of pasture remain.

== Blaen Cwm Bach Roman Camp ==
On the hillside to the southeast of Tonna is the earthwork evidence of a large rectangular Roman camp. Known at Blaen Cwm Bach Camp, this was a temporary stopping-place built by a Roman army unit on the move, and at 880 metres (960 yd) from east to west, and 300 metres (330 yd) wide, it is the largest such camp in Wales. A bank and ditch was cut into the rocky ground, on the top of a broad ridge on the hill above Tonna. It is no longer a continuous bank but it is uncertain if the gaps were never built or have been eroded away. In the northwest corner of the camp is the earthwork evidence of an Iron Age enclosure, which predates the Roman Camp and would have been within its boundary banks. The whole camp area is a scheduled monument.

== Government and politics ==
The electoral ward of Tonna falls within the parliamentary constituency of Neath and Swansea East. The ward consists of a small built-up area of Tonna village to the northwest with rest of the ward consisting of woodland and pasture. Tonna is bounded by the wards of Aberdulais to the north; Resolven to the northeast; Pelenna to the southeast; Cimla and Neath North to the southwest; and Cadoxton to the west.

In the 2022 local council elections, two councillors were elected to Neath Port Talbot Council from the combined Resolven and Tonna Ward. The electorate turnout was 44%. The results were:

Resolven and Tonna 2022
Party	Candidate	Votes	%	±%
Labour	Leanne Jones*	914	45.9	
Independent	Dean Lewis	842	42.3	
Independent	Matty Young	737	37.0	
Labour	Neil Francis	702	35.2	
Plaid Cymru	Andrew Clarke	287	14.4	
Plaid Cymru	Paul Sambrook	238	11.9	
Turnout		2,001	44	
Labour hold		Swing		
Independent gain from Labour		Swing		
