= Gwenda Thomas =

British politician (born 1942)

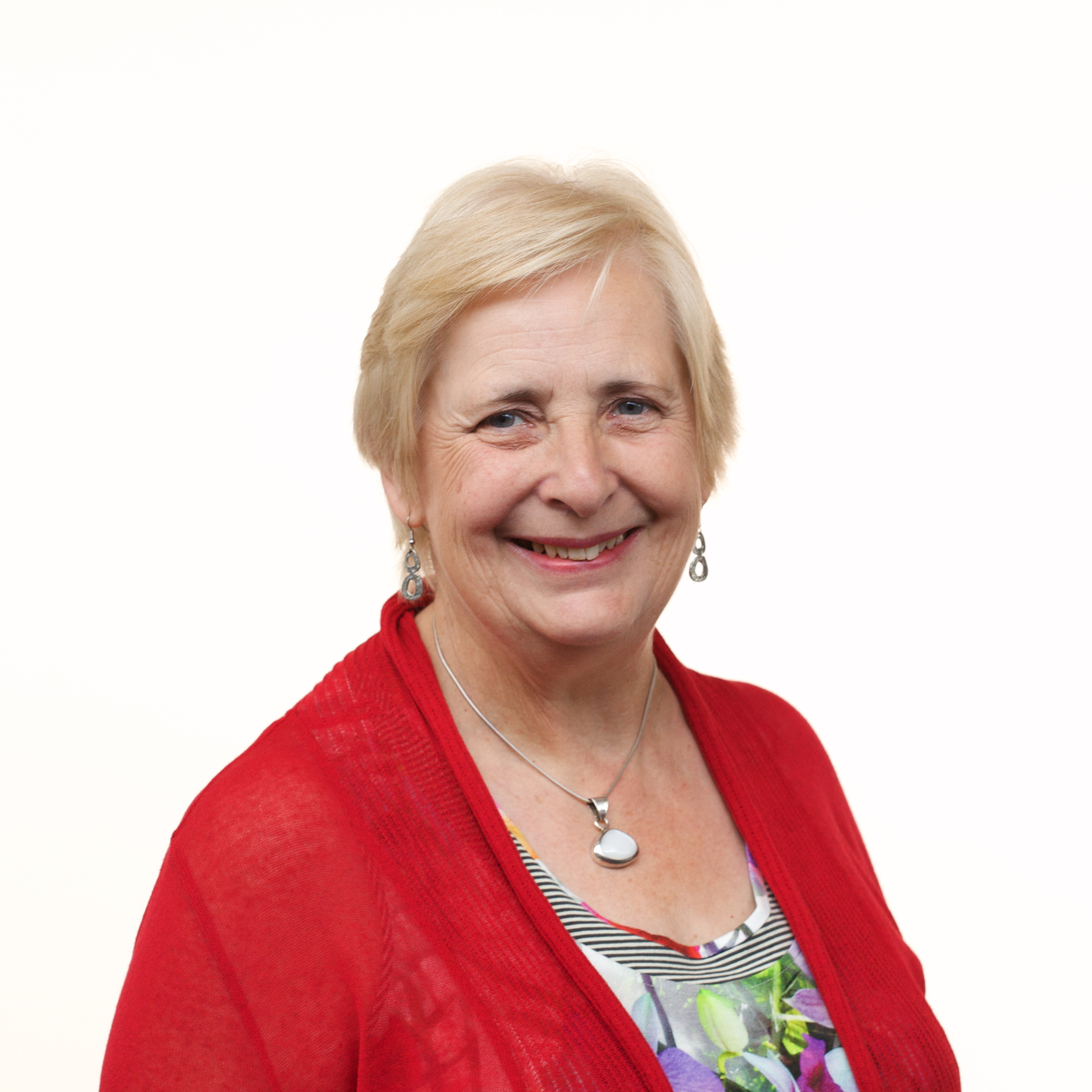

Member of the Welsh Assembly for Neath
- In office 6 May 1999 – 6 April 2016
- Preceded by: New Assembly
- Succeeded by: Jeremy Miles
- Majority: 6,390 (26.8%)

Personal details
- Born: 22 January 1942 (age 84) Neath, Wales
- Party: Welsh Labour
- Spouse: Morgan J. Thomas (1939-2013)
- Children: 1 (Son)
- Website: Gwenda Thomas AM

Gwenda Thomas (born 22 January 1942 in Neath) is a Welsh Labour politician who served as Member of the Welsh Assembly for Neath from the Assembly's start in 1999 to 2016. Thomas was first elected to the National Assembly for Wales in 1999 and re-elected in 2003, having almost doubled her majority.

== Background ==
Thomas was educated at Pontardawe Grammar School, she lives in Gwaun-Cae-Gurwen. Thomas was married to her late husband Morgan (1939–2013) for nearly 50 years, and they have one son, Geraint and a granddaughter, Charlotte.

She is a fluent Welsh speaker. She is a member of the GMB Union. She worked in the County Courts Division of the Lord Chancellor's Department and at the Benefits Agency as an executive officer for many years.

On 10 January 2017 she received an honorary doctorate from Swansea University.

Mrs Thomas is a campaigner for carers' rights and a past member of the Lord Chancellor's advisory committee. Her interests include health, social services, children's issues, local government and the voluntary sector.

== Political career ==
=== Local Government ===
Mrs Thomas served on West Glamorgan County Council as chair of the Social Services Committee - the first female councillor to chair such a major committee. She later served in the same position on Neath Port Talbot County Borough Council following local government reorganisation in 1995.

=== National Assembly for Wales ===
Thomas was selected to contest the Neath constituency for the new National Assembly for Wales in January 1999. She was elected in the first Welsh Assembly elections later that year with a majority of 2,618 votes, with Plaid Cymru significantly outperforming prior Westminster election results to limit her majority to that. She was re-elected again at the 2003 elections with a majority of 4,946, 2007 elections with a reduced majority of 1,944 and 2011 elections with her largest majority of 6,390. In 2016, she stood down from the role, and Jeremy Miles was selected to replace her as AM for Neath.

Thomas chaired the First Assembly's Local Government and Housing committee. In the second assembly, she chaired the Equality of Opportunity Committee and sat on the Assembly's Standards Committee. She was also appointed in December 2003 by the First Minister Rhodri Morgan, to chair a review into safeguarding vulnerable children in Wales. The review's report - Keeping Us Safe - was published on 3 May 2006.

Shortly after being re-elected to the Third Assembly, she was appointed as a Deputy Minister under the Minister for Health and Social Services, with responsibility for Social Services. She retained the role of Deputy Minister for Social Services after the coalition between Welsh Labour and Plaid Cymru was formed a month later, and when Rhodri Morgan was replaced as First Minister by Carwyn Jones.

In the Fourth Assembly, she held the position of Deputy Minister for Children and Social Services, with her responsibilities amongst others being childcare, child trust funds and parenting programmes. She was removed from her ministerial role in a September 2014 reshuffle.

In 2015, Thomas confirmed that she was intending to stand down at the 2016 Welsh Assembly election. Jeremy Miles was selected to replace her and contest the Neath constituency in October 2015.

== Offices held ==
Senedd
Preceded by (new post)	Assembly Member for Neath; 1999–2016	Succeeded by Jeremy Miles
Political offices
Preceded by (new post)	Deputy Minister for Social Services; 2007–2014	Succeeded by Vaughan Gething (as Deputy Health Minister)
