= 1973 Neath Borough Council election =

Welsh regional election

The first election to Neath Borough Council was held in April 1973. It was followed by the 1976 election. On the same day there were elections to the other local authorities and community councils in Wales.

The election resulted in an overwhelming Labour majority.

== Results ==
=== Blaengwrach (one seat) ===
Blaengwrach 1973
Party	Candidate	Votes	%	±%
Labour	David Thomas	unopposed		
Labour win (new seat)				

=== Briton Ferry (four seats) ===
Briton Ferry 1973
Party	Candidate	Votes	%	±%
Labour	William Brown	1,866		
Labour	William John Davies	1,785		
Labour	Mary Anne Moule	1,766		
Labour	Arthur Powell	1,709		
Plaid Cymru	D. Evans	1,214		
Labour win (new seat)				
Labour win (new seat)				
Labour win (new seat)				
Labour win (new seat)				

=== Bryncoch (three seats) ===
Bryncoch 1973
Party	Candidate	Votes	%	±%
Labour	Iris Hobbs	1,031		
Labour	Gwyn Gower	808		
Independent	Trevor Rees Matthews	723		
Independent	Meyric Thomas	662		
Plaid Cymru	David Huw John	577		
Labour win (new seat)				
Labour win (new seat)				
Independent win (new seat)				

=== Cadoxton (one seat) ===
Cadoxton 1973
Party	Candidate	Votes	%	±%
Labour	David John Davies	336	55.2	
Plaid Cymru	Ivor Thomas Morgan	273	44.8	
Majority				
Turnout			54.9	
Labour win (new seat)				

=== Cilfrew (one seat) ===
Cilfrew 1973
Party	Candidate	Votes	%	±%
Labour	Myrddin Morris	386	46.7	
Independent	Thomas Edward Rees	252	30.5	
Plaid Cymru	Janet Beatrice Anne Thomas	188	22.8	
Majority			16.2	
Turnout			73.8	
Labour win (new seat)				

=== Coedffranc (four seats) ===
Coedffranc 1973
Party	Candidate	Votes	%	±%
Independent	Martin Thomas*	2,465		
Labour	Leslie Ball	1,618		
Labour	R. Bennett	1,363		
Labour	R. Day	1,320		
Communist	Glaslyn Morgan	1,277		
Labour	Arthur Williams	1,196		
Independent	Eric Vernon Matthews*	1,185		
Independent	J. Wilsher	1,150		
Plaid Cymru	T. Phillips	974		
Ind. Socialist	A. Hames	511		
Independent win (new seat)				
Labour win (new seat)				
Labour win (new seat)				
Labour win (new seat)				

=== Dulais Higher and Lower (one seat) ===
Dulais Higher and Lower 1973
Party	Candidate	Votes	%	±%
Labour	C. James	573	51.6	
Independent Labour	D. Davies	538	48.6	
Majority				
Turnout			54.9	
Labour win (new seat)				
