= Dyffryn Clydach =

- Location within Neath Port Talbot
- Population: 3,162 (2011 census)
- OS grid reference: SS735987
- Principal area: Neath Port Talbot
- Preserved county: West Glamorgan
- Country: Wales
- Sovereign state: United Kingdom
- Post town: NEATH
- Postcode district: SA10
- Dialling code: +44-1792/+44-1639
- Police: South Wales
- Fire: Mid and West Wales
- Ambulance: Welsh
- UK Parliament: Neath
- Senedd Cymru – Welsh Parliament: Neath
- Councillors: Martyn Peters (Plaid Cymru)
- List of places UK Wales Neath Port Talbot 51.67278°N 3.83077°W Map of the community

Dyffryn Clydach is a community of Neath Port Talbot county borough, Wales, between Neath and Swansea.

== Description ==
Dyffryn Clydach includes the residential communities of Cwrt Herbert, Dyffryn, Highlands, Longford, Neath Abbey, and Penshannel.

Although covering only 7 km^{2} (2.7 sq mi), the area is packed with history, including the ruins of Neath Abbey. The current Tesco store is believed to occupy the site of an 11th-century castle.

The more central and northerly parts of the ward are mostly rural, consisting of picturesque farmland and woodland encircling the western base of Mount Drummau. The Clydach Brook flows through Dyffryn Clydach in a north to south direction, passing Neath Abbey. The woodland surrounding the river forms a public park.

== Amenities ==
There is a business park to the south of the community area with a junction onto the A465 trunk road which, heading east, joins the M4 Motorway at Junction 43, less than five minutes away. There are three local schools: Neath Abbey infant and Early Years School, Mynachlog Nedd Juniors, and Dwr Y Felin Lower School.

Near the business park are located the ruins of the Cistercian monastery of Mynachlog Nedd, the Tennant Canal, and Neath Abbey Ironworks. There is much woodland in the area with footpaths maintained by the community council.

Longford Memorial Hall is a recently refurbished community centre and village hall and has two committee rooms. There is also a community centre at Cwrt Herbert.

== Governance ==
Dyffryn Clydach is in the parliamentary constituency of Neath. It is coterminous with the Dyffryn electoral ward, which is bounded to the north by Allt-Wen ward; to the east by Bryncoch North and Bryncoch South; to the south by Neath East; to the southwest by Coedffranc North and Coedffranc Central; and to the west by the wards of Llansamlet and Clydach (both in Swansea). Dyffryn ward elects a county councillor to Neath Port Talbot County Borough Council.

Dyffryn Clydach has its own community council, made up of thirteen councillors.

In the May 2017 Neath Port Talbot County Borough Council election the results were:

Candidate	Party	Votes	Status
Martyn Peters	Plaid Cymru	826	Plaid Cymru hold
Debbie Harvey	Labour	299	

== Notable people ==
- Howell Moore-Gwyn MC DSO (1886–1956), first-class cricketer and British Army officer
