= Cadoxton, Glamorgan =

Cadoxton, Glamorgan may refer to:

- Cadoxton-juxta-Neath, in the Neath Port Talbot county borough in Wales
- Cadoxton, Vale of Glamorgan, in the Vale of Glamorgan county borough in Wales
