= Aberdulais =

Coordinates: 51.679°N 3.780°W

- Location within Neath Port Talbot
- Population: 2,400 (2011 census)
- OS grid reference: SS773995
- Principal area: Neath Port Talbot
- Preserved county: West Glamorgan
- Country: Wales
- Sovereign state: United Kingdom
- Post town: NEATH
- Postcode district: SA10
- Dialling code: 01639
- Police: South Wales
- Fire: Mid and West Wales
- Ambulance: Welsh
- UK Parliament: Neath and Swansea East
- Senedd Cymru – Welsh Parliament: Neath
- Councillors: Doreen Jones (Labour); Lee Bromham-Nichols (Plaid Cymru)

Aberdulais is a village and electoral ward in Neath Port Talbot, Wales, lying on the River Neath, in the community of Blaenhonddan. The village grew around the Aberdulais Falls, the site of successive industries and now a hydro-electric station. The National Trust owns and administers the site.

The name Aberdulais is from the Welsh for the mouth of the River Dulais.

== Industrial history ==
Aberdulais has a lengthy industrial history thanks to the abundant supply of energy derived from the waterfall and the presence in the vicinity of coal and timber. The first business here was a copper smelting industry, using ore delivered via boat from Cornwall. Over the years the site was successively used as an ironworks, a cornmill and a tinplate works. The Welsh tinplate industry was very successful for a time, until the American government levied heavy duties on imported tinplate.

The present water wheel is a modern steel structure 8.2 m (27 ft) in diameter. It generates electricity for use on the site, any excess current being fed into the national grid.

== Other history ==
In the eighteenth and nineteenth centuries, various artists visited the falls to paint. In 1795, J. M. W. Turner used a sketch he made here of the waterfall and cornmill to paint his watercolour "Aberdulais Mill, Glamorganshire" which hangs at the National Library of Wales. John Ruskin also painted here.

== Amenities and attractions ==
Local attractions include a canal and the Cefn Coed Colliery Museum. Aberdulais Falls and the associated industrial infrastructure are in the care of the National Trust in recognition of the site's value as a key part of the region's industrial heritage. The water wheel at Aberdulais falls produces £20,000 worth of electricity that powers the site, and the surplus is sold back to the national grid.

Several of the old buildings remain, and the tall smokestack of the tinplate works towers above the site. The school house for the children of the workers survives. The remains of a bridge that formerly linked the site by a tramway to the Tennant Canal can be seen.

== Government and politics ==
Aberdulais is also the name of an electoral ward covering the village. It is a constituent of the community of Blaenhonddan. The electoral ward of Aberdulais includes some or all of the settlements of Aberdulais and Cilfrew in the parliamentary constituency of Neath and Swansea East. Most of the ward consists of woodland and farmland with a small residential area to the far south. Aberdulais is bounded by the wards of Crynant to the north; Resolven to the east; Tonna to the south; and Cadoxton and Bryncoch North to the west.

In the 2022 local council elections the results were:

Candidate	Party	Votes	Status
Doreen Jones	Labour	186	Elected
Lee Bromham-Nichols	Plaid Cymru	160	Elected
Vicki Elizabeth Leclerc	Plaid Cymru	111	

In the 2017 local council elections the results were:

Candidate	Party	Votes	Status
Doreen Jones	Labour	344	Labour hold
Simon Hopkins	Independent	282	
Daniel Thomas	Plaid Cymru	118	

In the 2012 local council elections, the electorate turnout was 40.81%. The results were:

Candidate	Party	Votes	Status
Doreen Jones	Labour	431	Labour hold
Ken Thomas	Plaid Cymru	290	
