= Bryncoch South =

Coordinates: 51.67753°N 3.81505°W

- Population: 5,273 (2001 census)
- Principal area: Neath Port Talbot
- Preserved county: West Glamorgan
- Country: Wales
- Sovereign state: United Kingdom
- UK Parliament: Neath
- Senedd Cymru – Welsh Parliament: Neath
- Councillors: Jo Hale (Plaid Cymru); Chris Williams (Plaid Cymru)

Bryncoch South is an electoral ward of Neath Port Talbot county borough, Wales forming part of the parish of Blaenhonddan. The ward elects two county councillors to Neath Port Talbot County Borough Council.

Bryncoch South covers some or all of the following areas: Bryncoch, Caewern and Rhydding in the parliamentary constituency of Neath. Bryncoch South is an almost completely developed ward. It is bounded by the wards of Bryncoch North to the north; Cadoxton to the east; Neath North to the southeast; and Dyffryn to the southwest.

In the 2012 local council elections, the electorate turnout was 37.25%. The results were:

Candidate	Party	Votes	Status
Rob James	Labour	856	Labour gain
Janice Dudley	Plaid Cymru	825	Plaid Cymru hold
Tony Wyn-Jones	Plaid Cymru	744	
Andrew Jenkins	Labour	703	

In the 2017 local council elections, the results were:

Candidate	Party	Votes	Status
Janice Dudley	Plaid Cymru	848	Plaid Cymru hold
Chris Williams	Plaid Cymru	808	Plaid Cymru gain
Emma Denholm-Hall	Labour	460	
Alex Sims	Labour	393	
Richard Minshull	Conservative	366	
Shadanna Wycherley	Conservative	290	
Catrin Brock	Green	110	
Frank Little	Liberal Democrats	102	

Councillor Dudley has represented the seat since 2004. While performing her duties as Mayor of Neath Port Talbot in August 2017 she was taken ill and died. A by-election was held on 23 November 2017 and the results were:

Candidate	Party	Votes	Status
Jo Hale	Plaid Cymru	525	Plaid Cymru hold
Emma Denholm-Hall	Labour	306	
Peter Crocker-Jaques	Conservative	105	
Sheila Kingston-Jones	Liberal Democrat	92	
Darren Thomas	UKIP	33	
