= Howell Moore-Gwyn =

Welsh cricketer and British Army officer (1886–1956)

Personal information
- Full name: Howel Gwyn Moore-Gwyn
- Born: 17 July 1886; Dyffryn Clydach, Glamorgan, Wales
- Died: 31 July 1956 (aged 70); Eastbourne, Sussex, England
- Batting: Right-handed
- Bowling: Unknown

Domestic team information
- Years: Team
- 1903–1912: Glamorgan

Career statistics
Competition	First-class
Matches	2
Runs scored	91
Batting average	30.33
100s/50s	–/1
Top score	58
Balls bowled	144
Wickets	0
Bowling average	–
5 wickets in innings	–
10 wickets in match	–
Best bowling	–
Catches/stumpings	1/–
- Source: ESPNcricinfo, 8 April 2019

Howel Gwyn Moore-Gwyn DSO MC (7 July 1886 – 31 July 1956) was a Welsh first-class cricketer and British Army officer. Moore-Gwyn served in the Rifle Brigade from 1906–1942, in a military career which spanned both world wars and saw him awarded both the Military Cross and the Distinguished Service Order. He also played first-class cricket for the British Army cricket team and for the Punjab Governor's XI in British India.

== Early life and military career ==
Moore-Gwyn was born at Neath and was educated at Winchester College. He debuted in minor counties cricket for Glamorgan in the 1903 Minor Counties Championship against Berkshire. From Winchester he attended the Royal Military College, Sandhurst, graduating into the Rifle Brigade as a second lieutenant in August 1906. He was promoted to the rank of lieutenant in April 1910. He played his final minor counties match for Glamorgan in 1912, having made a total of twelve appearances in the Minor Counties Championship since 1903. He was made an adjutant in December 1913, with promotion to the rank of captain in June 1914.

He served during the First World War, during which he was awarded the Military Cross in June 1915. He was promoted to the acting rank of major in September 1916, with him relinquishing the rank in November 1916. He was again made an acting major in March 1917, and was mentioned in dispatches in July 1917, the same month in which he relinquished his acting rank of major.

== Later military career and life ==
Moore-Gwyn was made a companion of the Distinguished Service Order in May 1919. He later made his debut in first-class cricket for the British Army cricket team against Cambridge University at Fenner's in 1923. He scored 58 runs in the Army's first-innings, before becoming one of Claude Ashton's seven wickets. In July 1924, he was seconded for service with the Colonial Office, with promotion to the rank of major coming in October of that same year. He relinquished his command at the Colonial Office in August 1928.

While serving in British India, he made a second appearance in first-class cricket for a Punjab Governor's XI against the Muslims at Lahore. He was promoted to the rank of lieutenant colonel in July 1934. Having completed his period of service in July 1938, he was placed on the half-pay list. However, with the threat of war with Germany, he was restored to the full-pay list in January 1939. He served in the Second World War, during which he was promoted to the rank of colonel in May 1940, with seniority to July 1937.

He retired from active service in October 1942 and was placed on the reserve of officers list. Having exceeded the age for recall, he was removed the list in July 1944. He died at Eastbourne in July 1956, exactly two weeks after his seventieth birthday.
