= Blaenhonddan =

Coordinates: 51°40′47″N 3°47′56″W

- Community
- Location within Neath Port Talbot
- Principal area: Neath Port Talbot
- Country: Wales
- Sovereign state: United Kingdom
- Police: South Wales
- Fire: Mid and West Wales
- Ambulance: Welsh
- List of places UK Wales Neath Port Talbot Map of the community

Blaenhonddan is a community of the Neath Port Talbot county borough, south Wales.

The community has its own community council and comprises some or all of the following areas: Aberdulais, Bryncoch, Cilfrew and Cadoxton. The community covers the electoral wards of Bryncoch North, Bryncoch South and Cadoxton. The population of the community taken at the 2011 census was 12,151.
