= Bryncoch =

Village in Wales

Coordinates: 51.682°N 3.818°W

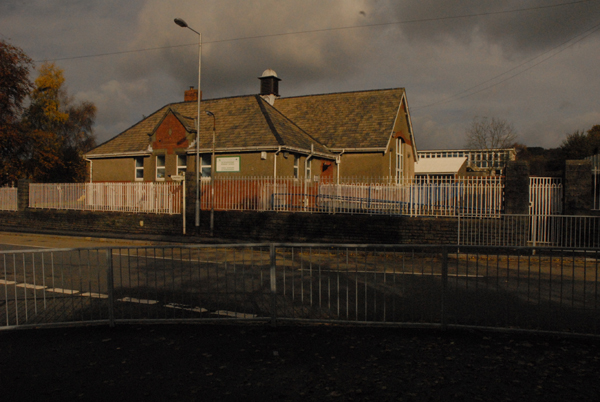
Blaenhonddan Primary School.

Bryncoch is a village near Neath in Neath Port Talbot County Borough, Wales. The name derives from the Welsh 'red hill' (bryn is hill, coch is red), originally the name of a nearby farm.

Bryncoch is divided into two wards: Bryncoch North and Bryncoch South, and is in the community of Blaenhonddan. The area is not regarded as hugely affluent, but is one of the generally better off areas in the deprived county borough of Neath Port Talbot

Historically the village of Bryncoch was centred on Main Road and a few adjacent streets, but the village expanded considerably in the 1960s with the building of the Furzeland Drive and Elias Drive developments. This area makes up the council ward of Bryncoch North, which has only one small street of social housing at Heol Pant Glas, named after a nearby farm located at the furthest northern corner of the ward. The council ward of Bryncoch South includes the distinct areas of the Rhyddings, Gilfach, Penywern, Leiros Parc, and the large social housing estate of Caewern.

There are two village primary schools: Blaenhonddan and the Bryncoch Church in Wales school. There is also a special school, Ysgol Hendre. The nearest secondary school is Dwr y Felin Comprehensive. Many village children also attend the Welsh-language secondary Ysgol Gyfun at Ystalyfera and the Welsh-language Ysgol Gynradd Gymraeg Castell-nedd.

== History ==
Bryncoch was once the principal site of the Main Colliery Company, an important coal mining employer in the area up until 1928. This was the scene of a major disaster on 6 April 1859, when 26 men and boys were drowned by an inflow of water, as reported in The Cambrian newspaper.

The philanthropist Howel Gwyn MP lived, from 1854, at the now demolished Dyffryn mansion on the outskirts of the village and built the parish church of St Matthew on his estate in 1871.

The renowned scientist Alfred Russel Wallace lived at Bryncoch Farm and studied Red Admiral butterflies while working as a surveyor for the Great Western Railway company around 1843. He developed the theory of evolution alongside Charles Darwin.

== Recreation ==
There are two pubs in or close to the village: the Bryncoch Inn at Ty'n yr Heol Road is near the social housing area of Caewern, while the Dyffryn Arms is on the A474 just north of Bryncoch. Bryncoch Rugby Club, located on Farmers Road, play in the WRU Division 3 South West.

Neath Branch of The Pony Club meet on their own field at Fforest Goch, nearby on the A474. They have previously won the prestigious Gymkhana team games competition at the Royal Welsh Show (The largest Agricultural show in Europe)

The village's third pub, the Lamb and Flag, which was perhaps the oldest in the area, closed in March 2017 and has been replaced by a Co-op supermarket.
