= Alltwen =

Coordinates: 51.714°N 3.846°W

Alltwen: Welsh: Pen yr Alltwen
- Location within Neath Port Talbot
- Population: 2,327 (2011)
- OS grid reference: SN726034
- Community: Cilybebyll
- Principal area: Neath Port Talbot
- Preserved county: West Glamorgan
- Country: Wales
- Sovereign state: United Kingdom
- Post town: SWANSEA
- Postcode district: SA8
- Dialling code: 01792
- Police: South Wales
- Fire: Mid and West Wales
- Ambulance: Welsh
- UK Parliament: Brecon, Radnor and Cwm Tawe
- Senedd Cymru – Welsh Parliament: Neath

Alltwen (or Allt-wen; translates to "white wooded slope") is a village in the Swansea Valley (Welsh: Cwmtawe) in Wales. Alltwen forms part of the community of Cilybebyll and is administered separately from adjoining Pontardawe on the opposite bank of the River Tawe.

Alltwen is served by Alltwen Primary School and the village has a rugby union club, Alltwen RFC (Welsh: Clwb Rygbi Alltwen).

== Government and politics ==
Allt-wen is an electoral ward of Neath Port Talbot county borough and is a part of the community of Cilybebyll. The ward is bounded by Trebanos and Pontardawe to the northwest; Rhos to the northeast; Bryn-côch North to the southeast; Dyffryn to the south; and Clydach (in Swansea) to the southwest.

Most of Allt-wen consists of farmland and woods. Occupying a strip of land in the northwest of the ward is Alltwen village, which is part of the built-up area surrounding Pontardawe.

== Notable people ==
- Alltwen was the home of Ronnie James, British Lightweight Boxing Champion in the 1940s and World Title challenger in 1946
- Rachel Thomas (actress), born in the village
- Siân Phillips, much of her childhood in the village
- Justin Tipuric, born in the village before moving to Trebanos as a child
- D. Gwenallt Jones, born in Pontardawe, was raised in Alltwen
