= Trebanos (electoral ward) =

Coordinates: 51.71551°N 3.85856°W

Trebanos ward
- Population: 1,411 (2011 census)
- Principal area: Neath Port Talbot
- Preserved county: West Glamorgan
- Country: Wales
- Sovereign state: United Kingdom
- UK Parliament: Neath
- Senedd Cymru – Welsh Parliament: Neath
- Councillors: Rebeca Lewis (Plaid Cymru)

Trebanos is an electoral ward of Neath Port Talbot county borough, Wales, part of the Pontardawe community.

Trebanos includes some or all of the following areas: Trebanos, Craig Trebanos and Pontardawe, in the parliamentary constituency of Neath. Trebanos is bounded by the wards of Pontardawe to the north and east; Alltwen to the southeast; and Clydach of Swansea to the south and west. Trebanos includes open moorland and has a developed strip in the centre of the ward which lies in the Swansea Valley.

In the 2017 local council elections, the electorate turnout was 45%. The results were:

Candidate	Party	Votes	Status
Rebeca Phillips	Plaid Cymru	284	Plaid Cymru hold
Rosemary Jones	Labour	187	
