= Rhos, Neath Port Talbot =

Coordinates: 51.7121°N 3.8287°W

Rhos
- Location within Neath Port Talbot
- Population: 2,442 (2011 census)
- OS grid reference: SN737030
- Principal area: Neath Port Talbot
- Preserved county: West Glamorgan
- Country: Wales
- Sovereign state: United Kingdom
- Post town: SWANSEA
- Postcode district: SA8
- Dialling code: 01792
- Police: South Wales
- Fire: Mid and West Wales
- Ambulance: Welsh
- UK Parliament: Neath
- Senedd Cymru – Welsh Parliament: Neath
- Councillors: Marcia Spooner (Plaid Cymru)

Rhos is a village in the Swansea Valley, located outside of Pontardawe, in Neath Port Talbot county borough, South Wales, in the community of Cilybebyll.

== History ==
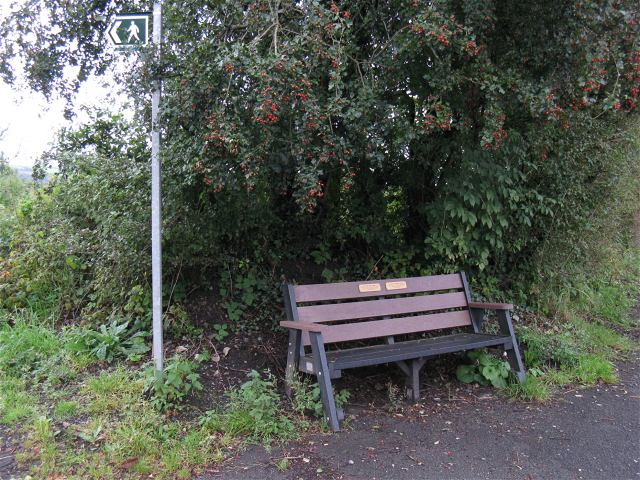
Bench in the village, in memorial for Primrose Colliery disaster of 1858, which claimed the lives of 14 miners (men and boys) and 7 horses

Originally part of the Cilybebyll estate, the Primrose Colliery was developed from the mid-1800s, close to the village. On 13 October 1858, when owned by Morgan and Lewis, fumes of an engine boiler suffocated 14 men and boys, and 7 horses. After the disaster, it was redeveloped as the New Primrose Colliery, owned by Sir Ralph Howard, and by 1896 employed 307. It closed in the early 1900s, but from 1908 was revived as a pumping station for the Tarenni Colliery.

== Today ==
Like many other villages in the former South Wales Coalfield, Rhos has seen phases of major building development within its boundaries bringing with it an influx of new residents to a community historically known for its own particular identity.

There is one primary school serving the village, called Rhos Primary School. The nearest secondary school is Cwmtawe.

== Government and politics ==
The electoral ward includes some or all of the following settlements Cilybebyll, Gellinudd and Rhos in the parliamentary constituency of Neath. Rhos is bounded by the wards of Ystalyfera and Ynyscedwyn (of Powys) to the north; Crynant to the east; Cadoxton to the south east; Bryncoch North to the south; Alltwen and Pontardawe to the west and Godre'r Graig to the northwest.

In the 2017 local council elections, the electorate turnout was %. The results were:

| Candidate | Party | Votes | Status |
|---|---|---|---|
| Alex Thomas | Labour | 440 | Labour hold |
| Marcia Spooner | Plaid Cymru | 297 | |
| Amanda Wycherley | Conservative | 227 | |

On 14 November 2019, a by-election was held following the resignation of Alex Thomas. The electorate turnout was 34%. The results were:

| Candidate | Party | Votes | Status |
|---|---|---|---|
| Marcia Spooner | Plaid Cymru | 359 | Plaid Cymru gain |
| Yvonne Lewis | Conservative | 162 | |
| Rupert Denholm-Hall | Labour | 145 | |
