= Neath North =

Coordinates: 51.66146°N 3.80718°W

- Population: 3,942 (2011 census)
- Principal area: Neath Port Talbot
- Preserved county: West Glamorgan
- Country: Wales
- Sovereign state: United Kingdom
- UK Parliament: Neath
- Senedd Cymru – Welsh Parliament: Neath
- Councillors: Alan Lockyer (Labour); Mark Protheroe (Labour)

Neath North is an electoral ward of Neath Port Talbot county borough, Wales falling within the community of Neath.

Neath North includes some or all of the neighbourhoods of Llantwit and Neath town centre in the parliamentary constituency of Neath. It is bounded by the wards of Bryncoch South to the northwest; Cadoxton to the North; Tonna to the northeast; Cimla to the southeast; Neath South to the south; and Neath East to the southwest.

== Election results ==
=== Neath Port Talbot ===
In the 2017 local council elections, the results were:

| Candidate | Party | Votes | Status |
|---|---|---|---|
| Alan Lockyer | Labour | 560 | Labour hold |
| Mark Protheroe | Labour | 517 | Labour hold |
| Andy Lodwig | Independent | 515 | |
| Orla Lowe | Conservative | 378 | |

In the 2012 local council elections, the electorate turnout was 34.69%. The results were:

| Candidate | Party | Votes | Status |
|---|---|---|---|
| Alan Lockyer | Labour | 709 | Labour hold |
| Mark Protheroe | Labour | 628 | Labour hold |
| Dai Howells | Independent | 341 | |
| Basil Ip | Conservative | 188 | |

Cllr Lockyer initially won his seat at a by-election on 6 May 2010, on a 63% turnout. This had followed the resignation of previous Labour councillor, Derek Vaughan, who had been elected as a Member of the European Parliament for Wales in 2009. He had been councillor for Neath North since 1995.

=== West Glamorgan ===
Between 1989 and 1996 Neath North was a ward to West Glamorgan County Council. The Labour councillor, Frank Evans, had previously been a representative for the Neath No.1 ward and was elected unopposed to Neath North in 1989. He was re-elected in 1993. He was elected to Neath Port Talbot Council in 1995.

=== Glamorgan ===
Until 1974 Neath North was a ward to Glamorgan County Council.
