= Derek Vaughan =

British politician (born 1961)

Derek Vaughan CBE
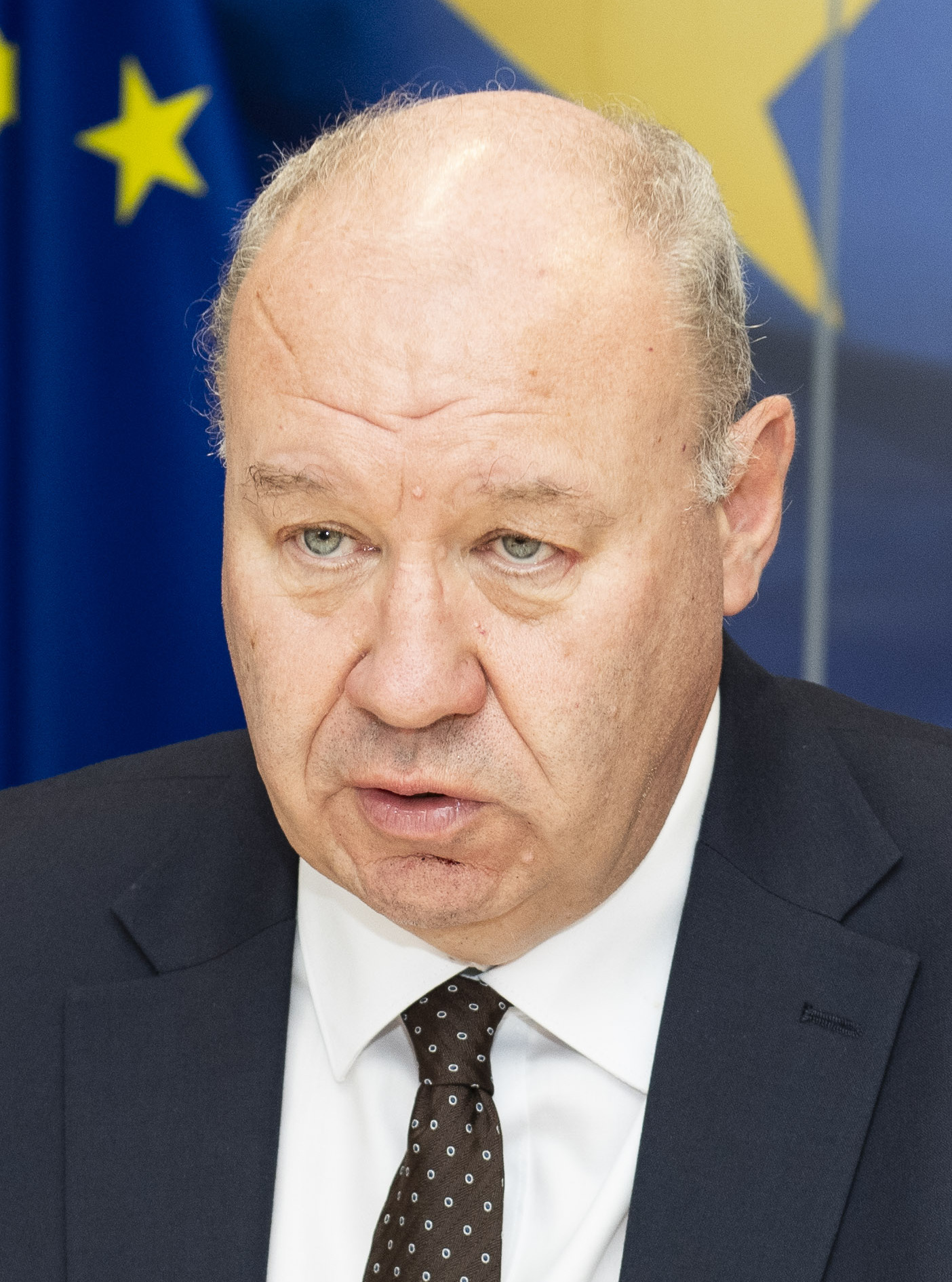
- Derek Vaughan in 2023

Member of the European Parliament for Wales
- In office 8 June 2009 – 1 July 2019
- Preceded by: Glenys Kinnock
- Succeeded by: Jackie Jones

Personal details
- Born: 2 May 1961 (age 65) Merthyr Tydfil, Wales
- Party: Labour Party (PES)
- Education: Swansea University

Derek Vaughan CBE is a Welsh Labour politician who served as a Member of the European Parliament (MEP) for Wales between 2009 and 2019.

== Early life and career ==
Vaughan was born in Merthyr Tydfil, first studying at Afon Taf High School before working locally as an engineering apprentice and later for the Valuation Office Agency.

He then went on to study Politics and History at Swansea University after which he returned to the Valuation Agency and then full-time as a trades union official for the Public and Commercial Services Union, a role he held until 2004.

== Political life ==
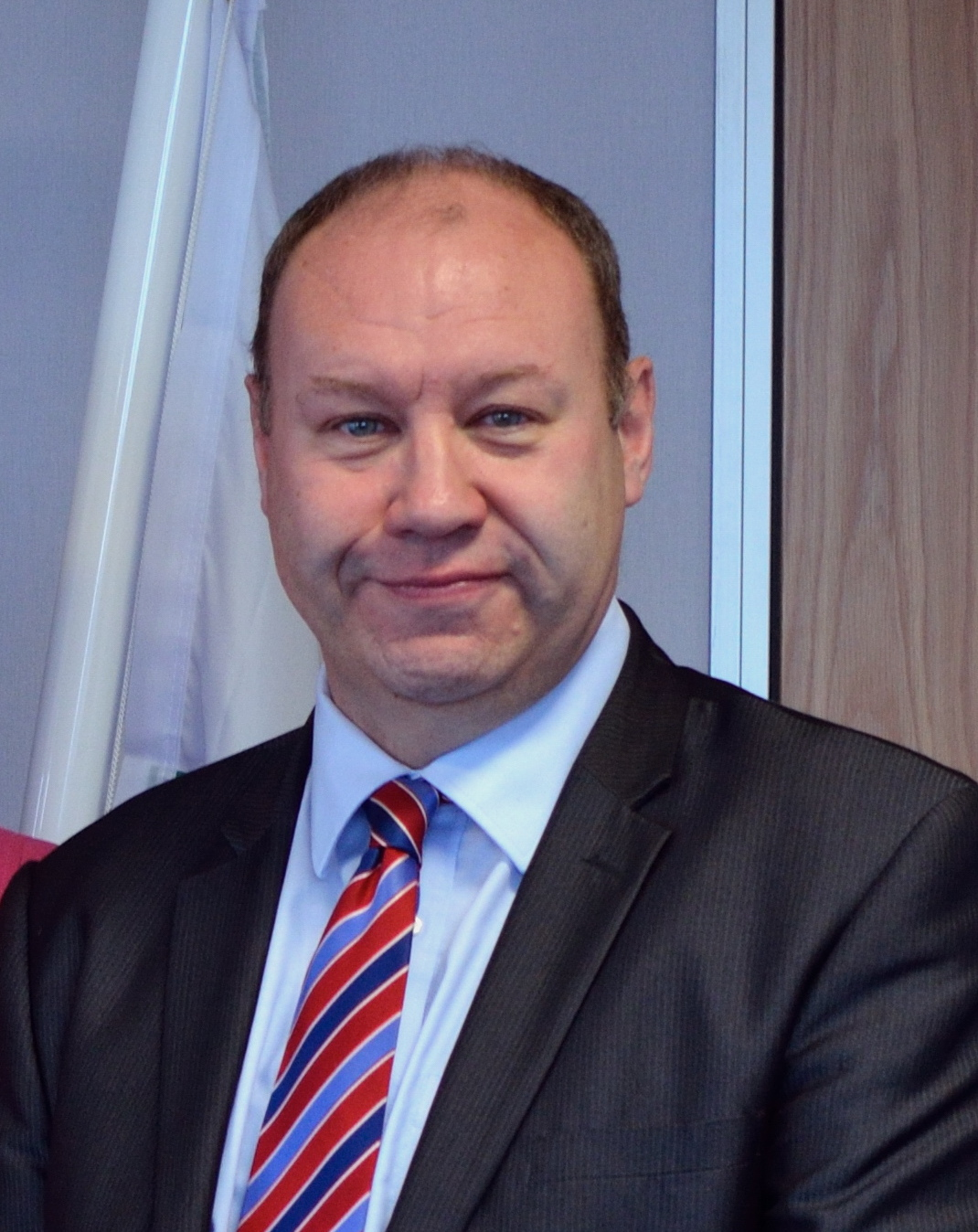
Derek Vaughan in 2012

Vaughan was first elected to Neath Port Talbot County Borough Council in 1995, representing Neath North. He became leader of the Labour group, and leader of the council, in 2004 before standing down in 2010 following his election as MEP.

He was also leader of the Welsh Local Government Association from 2005 to 2008 and deputy leader from 2008 to 2009.

In 2009, Vaughan was the first candidate on the Labour Party list for the 2009 European Parliament election in Wales, and was elected on 8 June. He stood successfully for re-election in the European Election 2014.

In the European Parliament, he was vice-chair of the Committee on Budgetary Control and a member of the Committee on Regional Development. He was also part of the delegation for relations with Australia and New Zealand.

In 2016, the Welsh Election Study found that Vaughan, along with two other Welsh MEPs from Plaid Cymru and the Conservatives, had less name recognition than an invented name.

Vaughan was appointed Commander of the Order of the British Empire (CBE) in the 2019 Birthday Honours.
