= District of Neath =

Former district of West Glamorgan, Wales

Coordinates: 51.661°N 3.804°W

Neath
- Borough
- Neath shown within Wales
- History
  - Created: 1 April 1974
  - Abolished: 31 March 1996
  - Succeeded by: Neath Port Talbot
  - HQ: Neath

Neath (Welsh: Castell-nedd) was one of the four local government districts of West Glamorgan, Wales from 1974 to 1996.

== History ==
The district was created on 1 April 1974 under the Local Government Act 1972, which reorganised local government across Wales and England. The new district covered the area of the former municipal borough of Neath, along with most of Neath Rural District, excluding the Rhigos parish, which went to Cynon Valley district.

In 1996 it merged with the district of Port Talbot to form Neath Port Talbot County Borough.

== Political control ==
The first election to the council was held in 1973, initially operating as a shadow authority alongside the outgoing authorities until it came into its powers on 1 April 1974. Throughout the council's existence the Labour Party held a majority of the seats on the council.

Party in control	Years
Labour	1974–1996

== Premises ==
The council was based at the Civic Centre at the junction of Gnoll Park Road and Prince of Wales Drive in Neath, which had been opened in 1966 as shared offices for the council's two predecessors. The building was subsequently used by the council's successor, Neath Port Talbot County Borough Council, for some years before being demolished in 2008 to make way for a retail development.
