= Carolyn Harris =

Welsh politician (born 1960)

Carolyn Harris MP
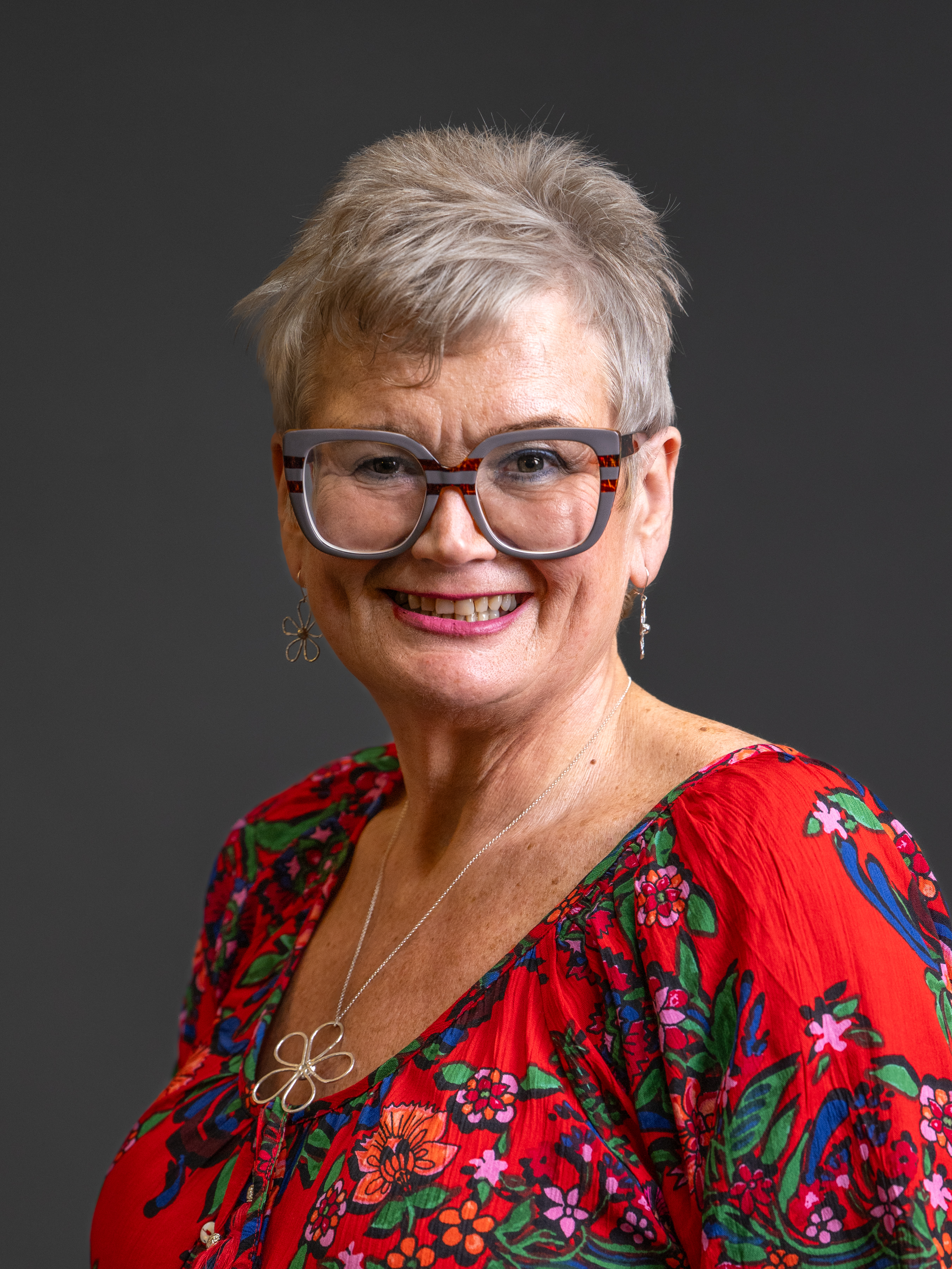
- Official portrait, 2025

Deputy Leader of Welsh Labour
- Incumbent
- Assumed office 21 April 2018
- Leader: Carwyn Jones; Mark Drakeford; Vaughan Gething; Eluned Morgan; Ken Skates
- Preceded by: Office established

United Kingdom Trade Envoy to New Zealand
- Incumbent
- Assumed office 28 January 2025
- Prime Minister: Keir Starmer; Andy Burnham

Parliamentary private secretary to the Leader of the Opposition
- In office 6 April 2020 – 11 May 2021
- Leader: Keir Starmer
- Preceded by: Tanmanjeet Singh Dhesi
- Succeeded by: Sharon Hodgson
Shadow portfolios
Shadow Minister for Women and Equalities
In office 3 July 2017 – 10 April 2020
Leader	Jeremy Corbyn
Preceded by	Cat Smith
Succeeded by	Gill Furniss
Shadow Minister for Safeguarding and Vulnerability
In office 9 October 2016 – 3 July 2017
Leader	Jeremy Corbyn
Preceded by	Sarah Champion
Succeeded by	Jess Phillips (2020)

Member of Parliament for Neath and Swansea East Swansea East (2015–2024)
- Incumbent
- Assumed office 7 May 2015
- Preceded by: Siân James
- Majority: 6,627 (16.5%)

Personal details
- Born: 18 September 1960 (age 66) Swansea, Wales
- Party: Labour
- Education: Swansea University
- Website: Official website

Carolyn Harris (born 18 September 1960) is a Welsh politician serving as Deputy Leader of Welsh Labour since 2018. She has been Member of Parliament (MP) for Neath and Swansea East, previously Swansea East since 2015.

Harris served as Shadow Minister for Safeguarding and Vulnerability from 2016 to 2017, and a junior Shadow Minister for Women and Equalities from 2017 to 2020. She was Parliamentary private secretary to the Leader of the Opposition, Keir Starmer, from 2020 to 2021.

== Early life and career ==
Harris was born on 18 September 1960 in Swansea, Wales. She attended Swansea University from 1994 to 1998, where she studied a joint degree in Social History and Social Policy.

Following university, Harris worked for Swansea-based community projects such as the Guiding Hand Association and the Joshua Foundation. She has previously worked as a barmaid and a dinner lady. Before her election to the Commons, she was a Parliamentary assistant to her predecessor, Siân James.

== Parliamentary career ==
Harris was elected to Parliament at the 2015 general election. She gave her maiden speech on 8 June 2015, in which she argued that Dylan Thomas was wrong about his description of Swansea as "this ugly, lovely town".

Harris served as Parliamentary private secretary (PPS) to the shadow Home Affairs team from September 2015 to October 2016. She was promoted within the team as Shadow Minister for Safeguarding and Vulnerability in September 2016, and became a junior Shadow Minister for Women and Equalities in July 2017.

Harris is a friend and ally of Keir Starmer, encouraging him to stand in the 2020 Labour leadership election and co-chairing his campaign. She was appointed PPS to Starmer when he became Leader of the Opposition in April 2020, serving until her resignation in May 2021.

Harris is a member of Labour Friends of Israel, and is a non-executive director of the Centre for Social Justice, a centre-right think tank founded by Conservative politician and former Work and Pensions Secretary Iain Duncan Smith.

On 28 January 2025 it was announced that Carolyn Harris would serve as United Kingdom Trade Envoy to New Zealand.

=== Deputy leadership of Welsh Labour ===
The Labour Party announced in September 2017 that it would create the position of Deputy Leader of Welsh Labour, and that the post would be held by a woman. On 24 January 2018, Harris was confirmed as one of three candidates, alongside Newport City Council leader Debbie Wilcox and Assembly Member (AM) and former MP Julie Morgan.

Harris was elected on 21 April 2018 after securing 51.5% of the electoral college vote, narrowly defeating Morgan. Harris won the majority of votes from affiliated groups, AMs and MPs, but lost the membership by a margin of 2 to 1. The electoral college system was abolished in favour of one member, one vote in September 2018.

=== Campaigns ===
Harris has led many successful campaigns during her time in Parliament, on issues including children's funerals, fixed-odds-betting terminals and electricity fires in homes. During her first year in Parliament, she raised issues such as the Swansea Bay tidal lagoon, electrification of the South Wales mainline to Swansea, and various consumer issues such as fixed odds betting terminals and faulty electrical goods.

After losing her son Martin in 1989, Harris was forced to take out a loan and rely on donations from the community to cover the funeral costs. Not wanting other parents to suffer the same hardship, Harris spoke about her grief in an adjournment debate on 28 November 2016. She went on to work with the Fair Funerals Campaign to press the Government to create a Children's Funeral Fund. The fund was announced for Wales in March 2017, by PM Theresa May for England in March 2018, and Scotland in May 2018.

Following a two-year campaign to reduce the maximum stake on fixed-odds-betting terminals from £100 per spin to £2, on 17 May 2018 the Department for Digital, Culture, Media & Sport announced that they would be reducing the stake in line with Harris's suggestion of £2 a spin.

Harris started a campaign on fires caused by electrical products in people's homes as a result of a death of a constituent, Linda Merron in Penlan, Swansea. Her campaign is to raise awareness of cheap electrical goods being sold online and the potential impact of unsafe goods and she has had several debates in the House of Commons on the issue.

=== Controversies ===
Harris faced allegations of making homophobic remarks by a former colleague in July 2018, as well as an alleged assault. She apologised for her conduct, which occurred before Harris was an MP, but added that her remarks would have been "office banter". Due to the equivocal nature of the apology, some party colleagues called for her to step down as a Shadow Equalities Minister. However, party leader Jeremy Corbyn, First Minister Carwyn Jones, and other LGBT colleagues supported Harris.

Harris was criticised for inviting Nicole Elkabbas, a convicted criminal, to speak at a parliamentary event on anti-gambling in February 2021. Two months earlier, Elkabbas was found guilty of eliciting tens of thousands in donations by faking a cancer diagnosis. Harris gave Elkabbas a character reference at her sentencing, which she defended as being "in connection with her addiction leading her to crime".

Harris resigned as Parliamentary private secretary to Starmer on 11 May 2021, accused of inflaming party tensions following the 2021 local elections and subsequent shadow cabinet reshuffle. The Guardian reported that a Labour MP had made a formal complaint about Harris' conduct and comments about the private lives of shadow cabinet ministers, which The Times reported to include Deputy Leader Angela Rayner. Harris denied being forced to step down, attributing her decision to personal issues and a high workload.

== Personal life ==
Harris has spoken about using Mounjaro injections to lose weight. She went from 19 stone (120 kg) to 11 stone (70 kg) in less than a year.

Parliament of the United Kingdom
Preceded by Siân James	Member of Parliament for Swansea East; 2015–present	Incumbent
Preceded by Tanmanjeet Singh Dhesi	Parliamentary Private Secretary to the Leader of the Opposition; 2020	Incumbent
