= Bryncoch North =

Coordinates: 51.68285°N 3.81961°W

- Population: 2,274 (2001 census)
- Principal area: Neath Port Talbot
- Preserved county: West Glamorgan
- Country: Wales
- Sovereign state: United Kingdom
- UK Parliament: Neath
- Senedd Cymru – Welsh Parliament: Neath
- Councillors: Wyndham Griffiths (Plaid Cymru)

Bryncoch North is an electoral ward of Neath Port Talbot county borough, Wales forming part of the parish of Blaenhonddan.

Bryncoch North covers some or all of the following Areas: Bryncoch and Gilfach in the parliamentary constituency of Neath. It is bounded by the wards of Allt-Wen and Rhos to the north; Cadoxton to the east; Bryncoch South to the south and Dyffryn to the west.

Bryncoch North consists of a built up residential area to the south and several farms which make up most of the central and northern part of the ward.

In the 2012 local council elections, the electorate turnout was 45.81%. The results were:

Candidate	Party	Votes	Status
John Bryant	Plaid Cymru	677	Plaid Cymru hold
Sion Griffiths	Labour	178	

In the 2017 local council elections, the results were:

Candidate	Party	Votes	Status
Wyndham Griffiths	Plaid Cymru	410	Plaid Cymru hold
Janet Lockyer	Labour	243	
Gavin Wycherley	Conservative	201	
