= Neath and Swansea East =

UK Parliament constituency (since 2024)

- constituency for the House of Commons
- Interactive map of the constituency.
- Location of the constituency within Wales
- Electorate: 74,705 (March 2020)
- Major settlements: Swansea (part), Neath, Skewen, Glynneath

Current constituency
- Created: 2024
- Member of Parliament: Carolyn Harris (Labour)
- Seats: One

Overlaps
- Senedd: Brycheiniog Tawe Nedd

Neath and Swansea East (Welsh: Castell Nedd a Dwyrain Abertawe) is a constituency of the House of Commons in the UK Parliament, first contested at the 2024 general election, following the 2023 review of Westminster constituencies. Carolyn Harris of Labour is the constituency's first Member of Parliament (MP); she was previously MP for Swansea East from 2015 to 2024.

== Boundaries ==
Under the 2023 review, the constituency was defined as being composed of the following, as they existed on 1 December 2020:

- The County Borough of Neath Port Talbot wards of Aberdulais; Blaengwrach; Bryn-côch North; Bryn-côch South; Cadoxton; Cimla; Coedffranc Central; Coedffranc North; Coedffranc West; Crynant; Dyffryn; Glynneath; Neath East; Neath North; Neath South; Onllwyn; Resolven; Seven Sisters; Tonna.
- The City and County of Swansea wards of: Bonymaen; Clydach; Llansamlet; St. Thomas.

Following local government boundary reviews which came into effect in May 2022, the constituency now comprises the following from the 2024 general election:

- The County Borough of Neath Port Talbot wards of Aberdulais; Blaengwrach and Glynneath East; Bryn-côch North; Bryn-côch South; Cadoxton; Cimla and Pelenna (part); Coedffranc Central; Coedffranc North; Coedffranc West; Crynant, Onllwyn and Seven Sisters; Dyffryn; Glynneath Central and East; Neath East; Neath North; Neath South; Resolven and Tonna.
- The City and County of Swansea wards of: Bon-y-maen; Clydach (most); Llansamlet; St. Thomas; Waterfront (part).

By population, it is made up as follows:

- 49.0% from Neath, accounting for 67.3% of the former constituency (parts in Neath Port Talbot CB, except Coedffranc).
- 30.7% from Swansea East, accounting for 37.2% of the former constituency (parts in City of Swansea, except Clydach).
- 13.2% from Aberavon accounting for 18.9% of the former constituency (Coedffranc).
- 7.2% from Gower, accounting for 9.1% of that constituency under its 2010–2024 boundaries (Clydach).

== Election results ==
=== Elections in the 2020s ===
General election 2024: Neath and Swansea East
Party	Candidate	Votes	%	±%
Labour	Carolyn Harris	16,797	41.8	−5.3
Reform	Dai Richards	10,170	25.3	+16.5
Plaid Cymru	Andrew Jenkins	5,350	13.3	+4.8
Conservative	Samantha Nida Chohan	3,765	9.4	−18.8
Liberal Democrats	Helen Ceri Clarke	2,344	5.8	+1.7
Green	Jan Dowden	1,711	4.3	+2.6
Majority		6,627	16.5	−5.3
Turnout		40,137	52.5	−7.4
Registered electors		76,291		
Labour hold		Swing	−10.9	

=== Elections in the 2010s ===
2019 notional result (Note: Estimate of the 2019 general election result as if the revised boundaries recommended under the 2023 boundary review were in place)
Party	Vote	%
Labour	21,102	47.1
Conservative	12,651	28.2
Brexit Party	3,965	8.8
Plaid Cymru	3,820	8.5
Liberal Democrats	1,849	4.1
Green Party	776	1.7
Other (2 candidates)	661	1.4
Majority	8,451	18.9
Turnout	44,824	60.0
Electorate	74,705	
