= Cadoxton-juxta-Neath =

Village in Neath Port Talbot, Wales

Coordinates: 51.671°N 3.808°W

Cadoxton (or in full Cadoxton-juxta-Neath) (Welsh: Llangatwg) is a village situated in Neath Port Talbot county borough, Wales. Cadoxton is located just outside the town of Neath and borders the villages of Cilfrew and Bryncoch. The village has 1,684 residents and is located in the Cadoxton ward. Cadoxton elected a Liberal Democrat representative in the 2008 council elections.

== History ==
The village's name in Welsh Llangatwg is equivalent to "St Catwg's" or the parish of Catwg/Cadoc. Cadoxton is the English language version, from "Cadoc's ton", ton meaning farmstead or village from Old English. Both versions of the name derive from the parish church, located in the centre of the village, which is dedicated to St. Catwg. The village developed its fuller name, Cadoxton-juxta-Neath, in order to differentiate it from Cadoxton, Vale of Glamorgan (also known as Cadoxton-juxta-Barry).

== Village character ==
The village consists of a main road of approximately 2 miles (3.2 km) running from the outskirts of the town of Neath to the village of Cilfrew, with smaller streets and housing estates feeding off. Cadoxton is home to two pubs, two newsagents and a park located in the centre of the village. Also in the village there is a community centre, a church hall, a garden centre, a funeral home and a guest house. Cadoxton was once home to a brewery, but this has now closed and new housing areas have been built up, seemingly closing the boundary between the village and the town of Neath. Housing in Cadoxton is mainly a mixture of relatively affluent estates consisting of detached housing, and smaller more traditional terraced accommodation. Crime is low in the village, and the area is generally considered to be one of the safest areas in the county.

Children from the village normally attend Catwg Primary School and then Llangatwg Comprehensive School, both located in the village. The secondary school accommodates students from numerous other villages in the area, some located up to 10 miles (16 km) away.

Also located in the village is Neath Golf Club, the course where past Ryder Cup player and captain Brian Huggett played as a junior.

== The church ==
The church of St.Catwg's is mentioned by W. H. Davies in his "Poet's Pilgrimage". Travelling through Cadoxton, Davies was struck by a gravestone in the churchyard which recorded the "SAVAGE MURDER" of a Margaret Williams in 1822 and promised her assailant a "TERRIBLE RIGHTEOUS JUDGEMENT". This is one of the very few murder stones in Wales.
