= Neath (Senedd constituency) =

Senedd constituency (1999–2026)

Coordinates: 51°43′14″N 3°46′11″W

Neath Castell-nedd
- Former Senedd county constituency for the Senedd
- Neath shown as one of the 40; Senedd constituencies

Former Senedd county constituency
- Created: 1999
- Abolished: 2026
- Party: Labour
- MS: Jeremy Miles
- Electoral region: South Wales West
- Preserved county: West Glamorgan

Neath (Welsh: Castell-nedd) was a constituency of the Senedd. It elected one Member of the Senedd by the first past the post method of election. Also, however, it was one of seven constituencies in the South Wales West electoral region, which elected four additional members, in addition to seven constituency members, to produce a degree of proportional representation for the region as a whole.

== History ==
From the creation of the assembly the constituency had returned a Labour AM, with varying majorities, from 7.7% to 26.8%. The last holder Jeremy Miles, was one of the first openly gay elected Members of the Senedd. Plaid Cymru were Labour's main opposition in the seat.

In the election in 2016 the constituency got the highest vote share from an independent in Steve Hunt with 8.1% of the vote. Hunt was the only independent to save his deposit.

== Boundaries ==
Map of 1999–2026 boundaries

The constituency was created for the first election to the Assembly, in 1999, with the name and boundaries of the Neath Westminster constituency. It was entirely within the preserved county of West Glamorgan.

The other six constituencies of the region were Aberavon, Bridgend, Gower, Ogmore, Swansea East and Swansea West.

== Voting ==
In general elections for the Senedd, each voter had two votes. The first vote was used to vote for a candidate to become the Member of the Senedd for the voter's constituency, elected by the first past the post system. The second vote was used to vote for a regional closed party list of candidates. Additional member seats were allocated from the lists by the d'Hondt method, with constituency results being taken into account in the allocation.

== Assembly Members and Members of the Senedd ==
Election	Member	Party	Portrait
1999	Gwenda Thomas	Labour	
2016	Jeremy Miles	Labour	

== Elections ==
=== Elections in the 2020s ===
2021 Senedd election: Neath
Party	Candidate	Constituency			Regional		
Party	Candidate	Votes	%	±%	Votes	%	±%
Labour	Jeremy Miles (Note: Incumbent member for this constituency)	11,666	42.2	+4.9	11,221	40.8	+3.0
Plaid Cymru	Sioned Williams	6,445	23.3	-2.5	7,265	26.4	-0.2
Conservative	Mathew Williams	4,107	14.8	+6.2	4,486	16.3	+8.1
Independent	Steve Hunt	2,418	8.8	New			
Green	Megan Lloyd	1,038	3.8	+1.5	1,098	4.0	+1.3
Abolish	Simon Rees	751	2.7	New	1,000	3.6	-0.4
Propel	James Henton	443	1.6	New	283	1.0	New
Liberal Democrats	Iain Clamp	395	1.4	-1.5	528	1.9	-2.5
Reform	Sean Prior	315	1.1	New	262	1.0	New
UKIP					466	1.7	-13.4
Independent	Caroline Jones				433	1.6	New
Gwlad					183	0.7	New
Freedom Alliance (UK)					181	0.7	New
Communist					71	0.3	0.0
TUSC					59	0.2	-0.3
Majority		5,221	18.93	+7.4			
Turnout		27,578					
Labour hold		Swing					
Notes

Regional Ballot void votes: 174. Want of an Official Mark (23), Voting for more than ONE party or individual candidate (44), Writing or mark by which the Voter could be identified (0), Unmarked or Void for uncertainty (107)

=== Elections in the 2010s ===
Welsh Assembly Election 2016: Neath
Party	Candidate	Constituency			Regional		
Party	Candidate	Votes	%	±%	Votes	%	±%
Labour	Jeremy Miles	9,468	37.3	−16.1	9,570	37.8	-10.3
Plaid Cymru	Alun Llewellyn	6,545	25.8	−0.8	6,736	26.6	+2.6
UKIP	Richard Pritchard	3,780	14.9	New	3,810	15.1	+11.5
Conservative	Peter Crocker-Jaques	2,179	8.6	-3.1	2,067	8.2	-2.6
Independent	Steve Hunt	2,056	8.1	New			
Liberal Democrats	Frank Little	746	2.9	−1.2	1,040	4.1	+0.1
Green	Lisa Rapado	589	2.3	New	682	2.7	+0.8
Abolish					1,012	4.0	New
Monster Raving Loony					194	0.8	New
TUSC					122	0.5	+0.1
Communist					74	0.3	±0.0
Majority		2,923	11.5	−15.3			
Turnout		25,363	45.8	+4.7			
Labour hold		Swing	-7.65				

Welsh Assembly Election 2011: Neath
Party	Candidate	Constituency			Regional		
Party	Candidate	Votes	%	±%	Votes	%	±%
Labour	Gwenda Thomas	12,736	53.4	+10.0	11,514	48.1	
Plaid Cymru	Alun Llewellyn	6,346	26.6	−9.1	5,733	24.0	
Conservative	Alex Powell	2,780	11.7	0.0	2,578	10.8	
BNP	Michael Green	1,004	4.2	New	845	3.5	
Liberal Democrats	Mathew McCarthy	983	4.1	−5.1	948	4.0	
UKIP					869	3.6	
Socialist Labour					504	2.1	
Green					457	1.9	
Welsh Christian					290	1.2	New
TUSC					105	0.4	New
Communist					78	0.3	
Majority		6,390	26.8	+19.1			
Turnout		23,849	41.1	−2.4			
Labour hold		Swing	+9.6				

Regional ballots rejected: 126

=== Elections in the 2000s ===
Welsh Assembly Election 2007: Neath
Party	Candidate	Constituency			Regional		
Party	Candidate	Votes	%	±%	Votes	%	±%
Labour	Gwenda Thomas (Note: Incumbent member for this constituency)	10,934	43.4	−7.7	9,388		
Plaid Cymru	Alun Llewellyn	8,990	35.7	+6.9	7,297		
Conservative	Andrew Sivertsen	2,956	11.7	+2.6	2,519		
Liberal Democrats	Sheila Ramsay-Waye	2,320	9.2	0.0	1,799		
BNP					1,222		New
Green					860		
UKIP					802		
Socialist Labour					387	0.	New
Welsh Christian					292		New
Respect					94	0.	New
Communist					86	0.	New
Keith James - Independent					83	0.	New
Socialist Alternative (UK)					78	0.	New
CPA					63	0.	New
Joel Jenkins - Independent					45	0.	New
Majority		1,944	7.7	−14.6			
Turnout		25,200	43.5	+4.4			
Labour hold		Swing	−7.3				

Welsh Assembly Election 2003: Neath
Party	Candidate	Constituency			Regional		
Party	Candidate	Votes	%	±%	Votes	%	±%
Labour	Gwenda Thomas	11,332	51.1	+5.6	10,286		
Plaid Cymru	Alun Llewellyn	6,386	28.8	−7.0	5,740		
Liberal Democrats	Helen C. Jones	2,048	9.2	−0.6	1,891		
Conservative	Chris B. Smart	2,011	9.1	+2.0	1,903		
Welsh Socialist Alliance	David Pudner	410	1.9	0.0			
Green					1,001		
UKIP					510		
Socialist Labour					405		
Cymru Annibynnol					212		
ProLife Alliance					88	0.	
Majority		4,946	22.3	+12.6			
Turnout		22,187	39.1	−8.9			
Labour hold		Swing	+6.3				

2003 Electorate: 56,759
Regional ballots rejected: 381

=== Elections in the 1990s ===
Welsh Assembly Election 1999: Neath
Party	Candidate	Votes	%	±%
Labour	Gwenda Thomas	12,234	45.5	N/A
Plaid Cymru	Trefor Jones	9,616	35.8	N/A
Liberal Democrats	David R. Davies	2,631	9.8	N/A
Conservative	Jill F. Chambers	1,895	7.1	N/A
Socialist Alliance	Nicholas Duncan	519	1.9	N/A
Majority		2,618	9.7	N/A
Turnout		26,895	48.0	N/A
Labour win (new seat)				
