= West Glamorgan =

Preserved county and former administrative county of Wales, United Kingdom

Coordinates: 51.822°N 3.833°W

West Glamorgan Welsh: Gorllewin Morgannwg
- West Glamorgan shown within Wales as a preserved county
- Area
  - 2003: 820 km^{2}
  - 2024: 819 km²
- Population
  - 2024: 394,553
- History
  - Created: 1974
  - Abolished: 1996
  - Succeeded by: Swansea; Neath Port Talbot; Preserved county of West Glamorgan
- Status: Non-metropolitan county (1974–1996); Preserved county (since 1996)
- Government: West Glamorgan County Council (abolished 1996)
  - HQ: County Hall, Swansea
- Coat of arms of West Glamorgan County Council
- Subdivisions
  - Type: Non-metropolitan districts
  - Units: 1. Swansea; 2. Lliw Valley; 3. Neath; 4. Port Talbot

West Glamorgan (Welsh: Gorllewin Morgannwg) is a former administrative county in South Wales. It is now a preserved county.

West Glamorgan was one of the divisions of the ancient county of Glamorgan. It was created on 1 April 1974, by the Local Government Act 1972 from the county borough of Swansea, the municipal boroughs of Neath and Port Talbot, the urban districts of Glyncorrwg and Llwchwr, Gower Rural District, Pontardawe Rural District, and all of Neath Rural District except the parish of Rhigos. From 1982, the main offices of West Glamorgan County Council were located in County Hall, Swansea.

West Glamorgan had four districts, as follows:

- Swansea – Swansea CB and Gower RD
- Lliw Valley – Llwchwr and Pontardawe RD
- Neath – Neath and Neath RD
- Port Talbot – Port Talbot and Glyncorrwg

Following the Local Government (Wales) Act 1994, West Glamorgan and its component districts were abolished on 1 April 1996, the area being divided into the two unitary authorities of Swansea and Neath and Port Talbot (later changed to "Neath Port Talbot"). Lliw Valley was partitioned between the two authorities. A West Glamorgan preserved county was created for the limited functions of Lieutenancy and High Shrievalty.

== Coat of arms ==
The arms of West Glamorgan were: Argent three chevronels gules, between in chief two pine cones vert dimidiating as many gouttes sable, and in base a lozenge sable. The crest is a Welsh Dragon holding a Tudor rose in its forepaws, rising above four gold cogwheels. The supporters are an osprey and a heron, both with a fish in their beaks, and wearing a chain round their necks. The osprey is standing on water, and the heron on a ploughed field. The motto is Cadarn pob cyfiawn (Welsh: 'The just are strong'). The chevronels derive from the arms of the de Clare family; the pine cones represent forestry; the black drops (gouttes) the oil industry; and the black lozenge, coal. The four cogwheels above the shield stand for the four districts and their industries; the chains around the supporters' necks, the steel and aluminium industries; the water and the fish, fishing; and the ploughed field, agriculture.

== See also ==
- Lord Lieutenant of West Glamorgan
- High Sheriff of West Glamorgan
- West Glamorgan constituencies
