= Neath Port Talbot =

County borough in Wales

Neath Port Talbot County Borough Bwrdeistref Sirol Castell-nedd Port Talbot (Welsh)
- County borough
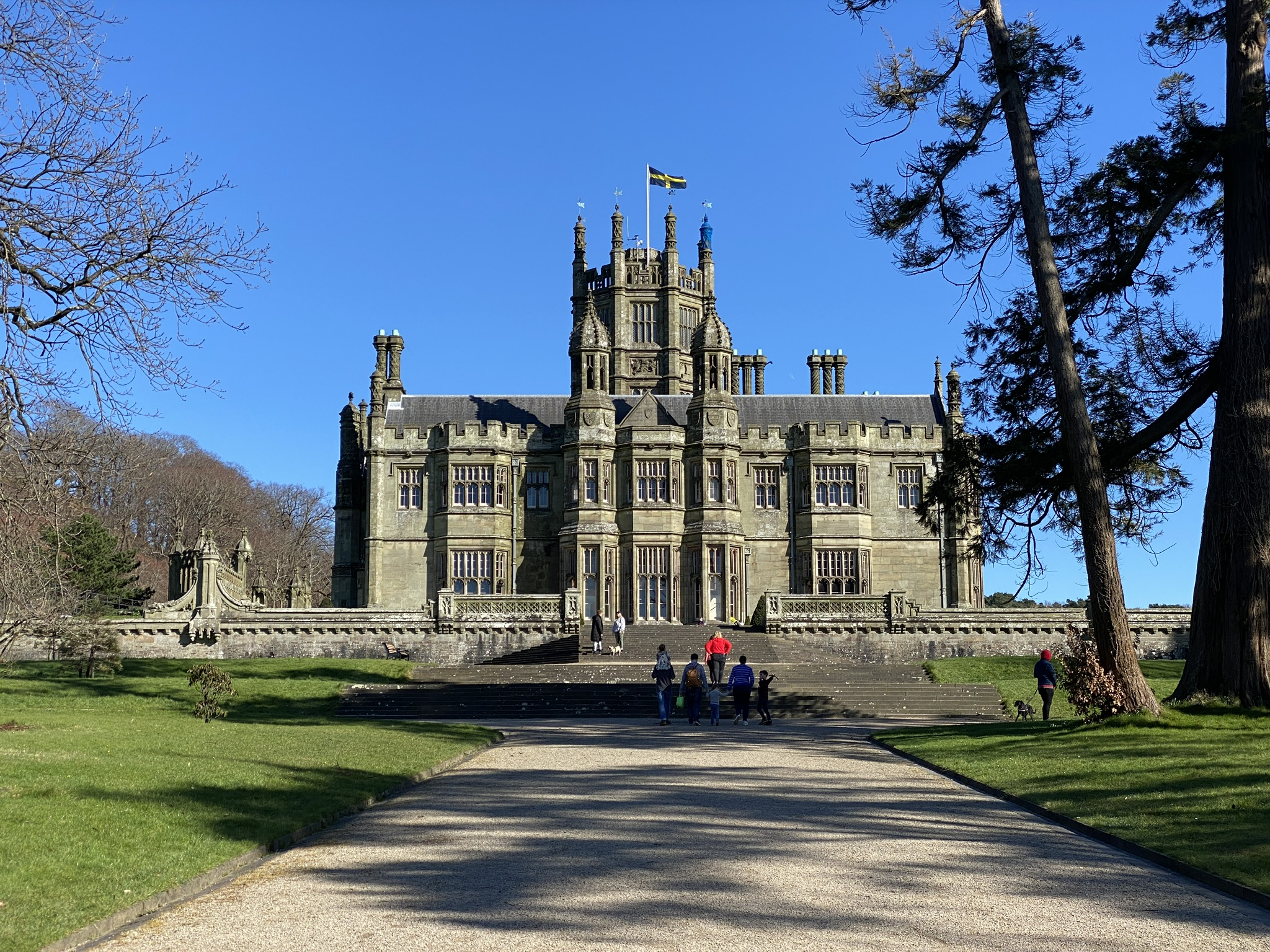
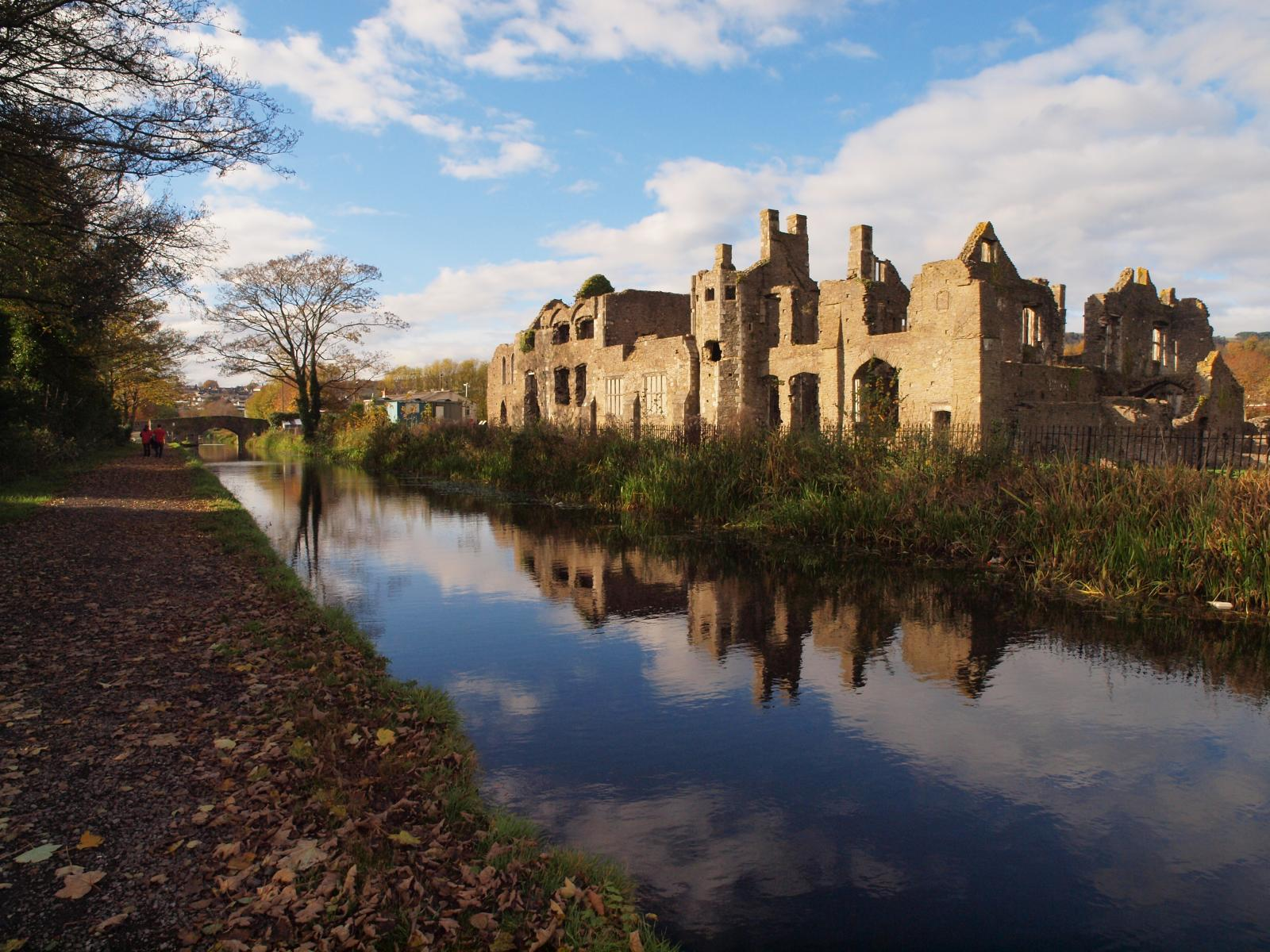
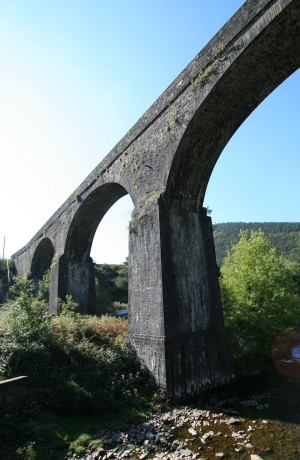
- Left to right: Margam Castle, Neath Abbey and Pontrhydyfen Aqueduct

- Coat of arms
- Motto: Welsh: Llwyddo drwy ymdrech, lit. 'success through effort'
- Neath Port Talbot shown within Wales
- Coordinates: 51°38′44″N 3°44′42″W
- Sovereign state: United Kingdom
- Country: Wales
- Preserved county: West Glamorgan
- Incorporated: 1 April 1996
- Administrative HQ: Port Talbot

Government
  - Type: Principal council
  - Body: Neath Port Talbot County Borough Council
  - Control: No overall control
  - MPs: 3 MPs: David Chadwick (LD); Carolyn Harris (L); Stephen Kinnock (L)
  - MSs: 12 MSs: 6 in Afan Ogwr Rhondda; 6 in Brycheiniog Tawe Nedd

Area
  - Total: 170 sq mi (441 km^{2})
  - Rank: 11th

Population (2024)
  - Total: 143,249
  - Rank: 9th
  - Density: 840/sq mi (325/km^{2})

Welsh language (2021)
  - Speakers: 13.5%
  - Rank: 9th
- Time zone: UTC+0 (GMT)
  - Summer (DST): UTC+1 (BST)
- ISO 3166 code: GB-NTL
- GSS code: W06000012
- Website: www.npt.gov.uk

Neath Port Talbot (Welsh: Castell-nedd Port Talbot) is a county borough in the south-west of Wales. Its principal towns are Neath, Port Talbot, Briton Ferry and Pontardawe. The county borough borders Bridgend County Borough and Rhondda Cynon Taf to the east, Powys and Carmarthenshire to the north; and Swansea to the west.

Neath Port Talbot is the eighth-most populous local authority area in Wales and the third most populous county borough. The population at the 2011 census was 139,812. The population in the coastal areas is mainly English-speaking, whereas in the valleys in the north of the borough there are many who are Welsh-speaking.

== Geography ==
The local authority area stretches from the coast to the border of the Brecon Beacons National Park. The majority of the land is upland or semi-upland and 43% is covered by forestry with major conifer plantations in upland areas. Most of the lower-lying flat land is near the coast around Port Talbot. An extensive dune system stretches along much of the coast, broken by river mouths and areas of development. The upland areas are cut by five valleys: Vale of Neath, Dulais Valley, Afan Valley, Swansea Valley (or Tawe Valley), Upper Amman Valley.

Modern settlement patterns reflect the industrial history of the area, with urban development along the flatter areas of the valleys and some parts of the coast. Neath with a population of 47,020 is the largest town, followed by Port Talbot (35,633), Briton Ferry (7,186), Pontardawe (5,035), and Glynneath (4,368). The majority of the population live in the coastal plain around Port Talbot and the land around the River Neath in the vicinity of Neath. Many of the larger towns in the borough lie within the Swansea Urban Area.

Neath Port Talbot County Borough is at the western end of the South Wales Valleys

== Demographics ==
The population in the region reached its peak in the 1930s. Census figures show a population of 151,563 in 1931. The population has shown a steady decline throughout the rest of the 20th century. The population stood at 134,471 in 2001. In the 1990s, most areas within the region showed a fall or little change in population with the notable exception of Bryncoch South and Margam where the population grew by 47.29% and 41.36% respectively. Local council estimates show the population to have grown during the 2000s.

According to the ONS census of 2021, Neath Port Talbot is roughly 97% White.

== Government and politics ==
On 1 April 1996, Neath Port Talbot was created from the former districts of Neath, Port Talbot and part of Lliw Valley. Originally known as "Neath and Port Talbot" in the legislation, the name change happened on the following day. At the time of the reorganisation, many local people expected that Neath and Port Talbot districts would become separate unitary authorities, and there were protests when the new authority was announced.

=== Local government ===
The whole of the Neath Port Talbot area was once part of the county of West Glamorgan, which in turn is part of the historic county of Glamorgan. Since local government re-organisation in 1996, Neath Port Talbot is governed by Neath Port Talbot County Borough Council.

Neath Port Talbot is a staunch Labour stronghold, who have been in power since the authority's formation in 1996; although after the 2022 local elections, Labour failed to retain control over the council after losing several council seats.

=== Welsh politics ===
The county borough contains two whole Senedd constituencies, which each elect six members of the Senedd, and the two constituencies are:

- Afan Ogwr Rhondda
- Brycheiniog Tawe Nedd

=== United Kingdom politics ===
The three UK parliament constituencies covering Neath Port Talbot (in pink) from 2024. 1 = Brecon, Radnor and Cwm Tawe, 2 = Neath and Swansea East and 3 = Aberafan Maesteg.

- Aberafan Maesteg, current MP is Stephen Kinnock, Labour since 2024
- Neath and Swansea East, current MP is Carolyn Harris, Labour since 2024
- Brecon, Radnor and Cwm Tawe, current MP is David Chadwick, Liberal Democrats since 2024.

== Economy and industry ==
In 1991 Neath & Port Talbot was a distinct travel to work area (albeit with different boundaries to the current county borough), but the 2001-based revision has merged the locality into a wider Swansea Bay travel to work area.

In June 2008, the economic activity and employment rates in Neath Port Talbot were below the Welsh average. However, earnings for full-time workers were higher than either the Welsh or British average.

Manufacturing accounts for over 22% of jobs in the county borough compared to under than 14% in Wales as a whole; just under 70% of local jobs are in services compared to a Welsh average of nearly 80%. The Port Talbot Steelworks, operated by Tata, remains the largest employer with approximately 3,000 staff (although in 1979 its predecessor employed 12,600). The last blast furnace closed in October 2024. Processing of imported steel slabs now produces rolled steel products, along with construction of a 320-ton capacity electric arc furnace to be operational in late 2027. Other large employers include General Electric, Hi-Lex Cable Systems Ltd (closing in 2021), TRW Steering Systems recently closed, Envases (UK) Ltd, Crown Food UK & Ireland, Toyoda Koki, Sofidel, Cornelius Electronics, Excel Electronics Assemblies, and Tedeco.

Port Talbot is also the site for Neath Port Talbot Hospital which is situated on Baglan Way, Port Talbot.

== Education ==
The local Neath Port Talbot Council is the education authority in the area which operates primary schools and secondary schools within the county. The local education authority operates 6 infant schools, 6 junior schools, 56 primary schools, 11 secondary schools and 3 special schools.

Further Education in Neath Port Talbot is provided by a range of institutions. St. Joseph's Catholic School & Sixth Form Centre in Port Talbot and Ysgol Gyfun Ystalyfera have traditional sixth form settings. NPTC Group operates from several sites within the county borough. The largest sites are located in Neath, Port Talbot and Pontardawe.

The first dedicated higher education site in Neath Port Talbot opened in 2015 when Swansea University opened its science and innovation campus in Crymlyn Burrows.

The University of South Wales has a campus located at Baglan Energy Park in Port Talbot. The Baglan campus houses a Renewable Hydrogen Research and Development Centre.

== Media ==
A separate daily edition of the South Wales Evening Post is published for the Neath Port Talbot area. The paper's publisher, Reach plc, also produces a free weekly paper, the Neath Port Talbot Courier, which is inserted in Thursday's edition of the South Wales Evening Post. The local council publishes a quarterly, Community Spirit, produced and funded in conjunction with seven other public sector partners.

Community radio station XS broadcast to the county borough on 97.4 & 107.9 FM before it became defunct in 2011. Nation Radio Wales briefly broadcast to the wider South Wales region from studios in Neath, but is now based in Cardiff. The county borough is within the local commercial radio licence areas of Hits Radio South Wales, its sister station Greatest Hits Radio South Wales, Swansea Bay Radio and Heart South Wales.

== Twinning ==
Neath Port Talbot used to be twinned with:

- Albacete, Spain
- Bagneux, France
- Esslingen am Neckar, Germany
- Heilbronn, Germany
- Piotrków Trybunalski, Poland
- Schiedam, Netherlands
- Udine, Italy
- Velenje, Slovenia
- Vienne, France

In 2015, Neath Port Talbot terminated all its twin city relationships for financial reasons.

== Places of interest ==
- Afan Forest Park, formerly known as Afan Argoed is a predominantly forest country park for walking and recreation. In recent times, it has become a mecca for mountain biking with the development of a number of demanding mountain biking trails.
- Margam Country Park is a frequent destination for the World Rally Championships and is very popular with tourists all year round. The park houses Go Ape tree tops adventure, Margam Castle, Margam Abbey, Margam Orangery, a fairy tale adventure playground and is set in extensive parkland.
- Aberdulais Falls are on the River Dulais and were portrayed in J. M. W. Turner's painting, The Watermill
- Aberavon Beach is a large blue flag beach resort, popular with surfers and kite boarders. The seafront houses a number of leisure facilities including a cinema, hotel, Aqua Splash park, children's play areas, and several bars, cafes and restaurants.
- Gnoll Country Park is a large country park with lakes, cascading waterfalls and the ruins of the historic Gnoll mansion, the former home of the Mackworth family.
- Crymlyn Bog a site of special scientific interest in Skewen near Neath.
- Cefn Coed Colliery Museum is a former coal mine now operating as a mining museum located in Crynant near Neath.

== Freedom of the Borough ==
The following people and military units have received the Freedom of the Borough of Neath Port Talbot.

=== Individuals ===
- David Lloyd George: 1920 (Borough of Neath)
- Michael Sheen: 15 July 2008
- Margaret Thorne: 15 July 2008
- Bonnie Tyler: 12 March 2011
- Andrew V. John: 18 October 2013
- Maxwell Boyce: 18 October 2013
- Colin Price: 18 October 2013

=== Military Units ===
- The Royal Regiment of Wales: July 1993.
- The Royal Welsh: 2006.

== See also ==
- List of places in Neath Port Talbot for a list of settlements
- List of schools in Neath Port Talbot
- Cuisine of Neath Port Talbot
