= Abergwynfi railway station =

Disused railway station in Abergwynfi, Neath

Coordinates: 51.6548°N 3.6018°W

Abergwynfi

General information
- Location: Neath Port Talbot; Wales
- Platforms: 1

Other information
- Status: Disused

History
- Original company: Great Western Railway
- Pre-grouping: Great Western Railway
- Post-grouping: Great Western Railway

Key dates
- 22 March 1886: Station opens
- 13 June 1960: Station closes
Location

Abergwynfi railway station served the villages of Abergwynfi and Blaengwynfi in Neath Port Talbot, Wales. The station was the terminus of the line from Bridgend via Maesteg.

== History ==
Opened by the Great Western Railway, the station passed on to the Western Region of British Railways on nationalisation in 1948. It was closed by the British Transport Commission.

The nearby Blaengwynfi railway station was on the Rhondda and Swansea Bay Railway.

== The site today ==
The site is a small wooded area in the village, next to the River Gwynfi.

Preceding station	Disused railways	Following station
Cymmer Afan	Great Western Railway; Llynvi Valley Extension	Terminus
