= Tynewydd, Rhondda Cynon Taf =

Coordinates: 51.680°N 3.548°W

Tynewydd
- Location within Rhondda Cynon Taf
- OS grid reference: SS 9307 9905
- Principal area: Rhondda Cynon Taf
- Preserved county: Mid Glamorgan
- Country: Wales
- Sovereign state: United Kingdom
- Post town: Treorchy
- Postcode district: CF42
- Dialling code: 01443
- Police: South Wales
- Fire: South Wales
- Ambulance: Welsh
- UK Parliament: Rhondda and Ogmore
- Senedd Cymru – Welsh Parliament: Afan Ogwr Rhondda

Tynewydd is a village in the county borough of Rhondda Cynon Taf, south Wales. Together with Treherbert, Blaencwm, Blaenrhondda, and Pen‑y‑r‑englyn, it forms part of the community of Treherbert. The village lies in the former industrial coal‑mining area at the head of the Rhondda Fawr, the larger of the Rhondda Valleys.

== History ==
It is believed that the village was named after 'Tynewydd' (built in 1652), a longhouse in nearby Blaenrhondda. The area was sparsely populated before the 18th century, but after the successful mining of the South Wales coalfield, the area experienced a population boom in the late 19th century. In 1865, Ebenezer Lewis, the owner of the Bwllfa Dare Colliery in Aberdare, purchased the lease of mineral property at Tynewydd on the east side of the River Rhondda. An old level on the hillside was reopened, and a shaft was sunk to exploit the lower levels. This mine was named Tynewydd Colliery (not to be confused with Tynewydd Colliery in nearby Porth, the site of an 1877 disaster), and in 1868 ownership was transferred to the Rhondda Merthyr Colliery Company for £50,000. The mine remained profitable until 1879, when a geological fault affected production. In 1887, the mine was purchased by Messrs L. and H. Gueret, and efficient production was re‑established. Although it produced 100,000 tons of coal in 1910, by 1911 it had closed.

== Transport ==
The village is connected to the national rail transport network by Treherbert railway station, the northern terminus of the Rhondda Line, which was originally the Taff Vale Railway line connecting the Rhondda and Swansea Bay Railway with the Rhondda Fawr collieries. The station is 37 km (23 mi) north‑west of Cardiff. The Rhondda Fawr line was extended from Dinas to Treherbert in 1856, and passenger services to Treherbert began in 1863.

== Bibliography ==
- Heroic Endeavour, by Major D.V. Henderson, pub. Hayward & Sons, 1988, ISBN 0-903754-39-8
