= Blaenrhondda railway station =

Disused railway station in Blaenrhondda, Rhondda Cynon Taf

Blaenrhondda
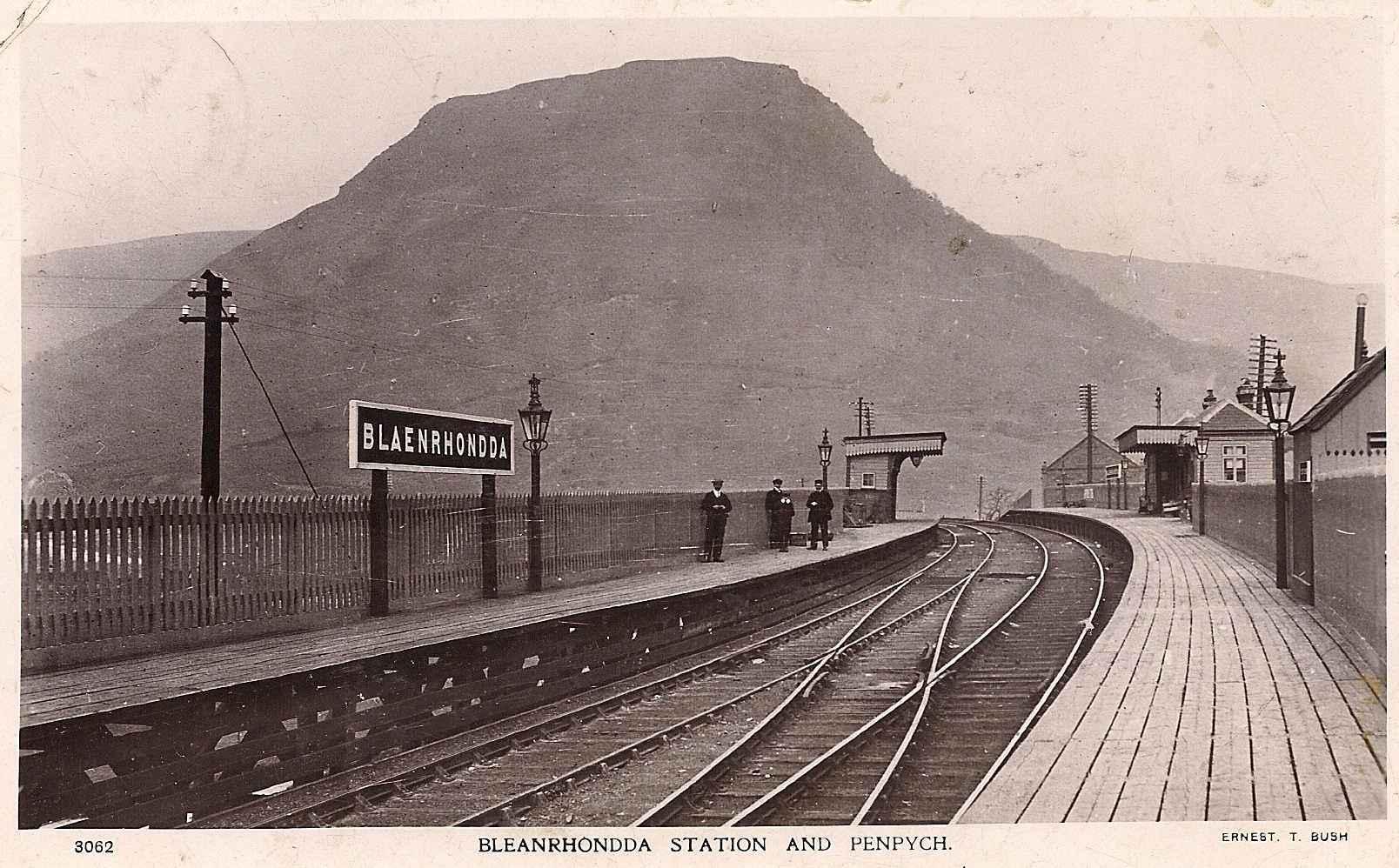
- The station in 1912

General information
- Location: Blaenrhondda, Glamorganshire; Wales
- Coordinates: 51.6795°N 3.549°W
- Grid reference: SS930990
- Platforms: 2

Other information
- Status: Disused

History
- Original company: Rhondda and Swansea Bay Railway
- Pre-grouping: Rhondda and Swansea Bay Railway
- Post-grouping: Rhondda and Swansea Bay Railway

Key dates
- 2 July 1890: Opened
- 26 February 1968: Closed
Location

Blaenrhondda railway station served the village of Blaenrhondda, in the historical county of Glamorganshire, Wales, from 1890 to 1968 on the Rhondda and Swansea Bay Railway.

== History ==
The station was opened on 2 July 1890 on the Rhondda and Swansea Bay Railway. It was known as Blean-Rhondda in the Great Western Railway timetable until 1936. It was downgraded to a request stop in 1965 and closed on 26 February 1968 due to the tunnel being unsafe.

Preceding station	Disused railways	Following station
Treherbert; Line closed, station open	Rhondda and Swansea Bay Railway	Blaengwynfi; Line and station closed
