= Pontrhydyfen railway station =

Disused railway station in Pontrhydyfen, Neath Port Talbot

Coordinates: 51.6336°N 3.7355°W

Pontrhydyfen

General information
- Location: Pontrhydyfen, Glamorganshire; Wales
- Platforms: 2

Other information
- Status: Disused

History
- Original company: Rhondda and Swansea Bay Railway
- Pre-grouping: Rhondda and Swansea Bay Railway
- Post-grouping: Great Western Railway

Key dates
- 25 June 1885: Opened
- 3 December 1962: Closed
Location

Pontrhydyfen railway station served the village of Pontrhydyfen, in the historical county of Glamorganshire, Wales, from 1885 to 1962 on the Rhondda and Swansea Bay Railway.

== History ==
The station was opened on 25 June 1885 by the Rhondda and Swansea Bay Railway. The nearby railway cutting was locally known as Rock of Gibraltar. It closed on 3 December 1962.

== Accidents ==
A collision occurred with a freight train and a passenger train. The freight was headed to Cwmavon. It was set to stop at the down platform but it went out of control when it was on the steep gradient. It carried on through Cwmavon and collided head-on with the passenger train. Both trains were traveling at 20 miles per hour. The driver of the passenger train and the fireman of the freight train were killed and twenty passengers, including the guards for both trains, were injured, three being seriously injured, including the driver of the freight train.

| Preceding station | Disused railways | Following station |
|---|---|---|
| Cynonville Halt; Line and station closed | Rhondda and Swansea Bay Railway | Cwmavon Glam; Line and station closed |
