= Cynonville Halt railway station =

Disused railway station in Cynonville, Neath Port Talbot

Cynonville Halt
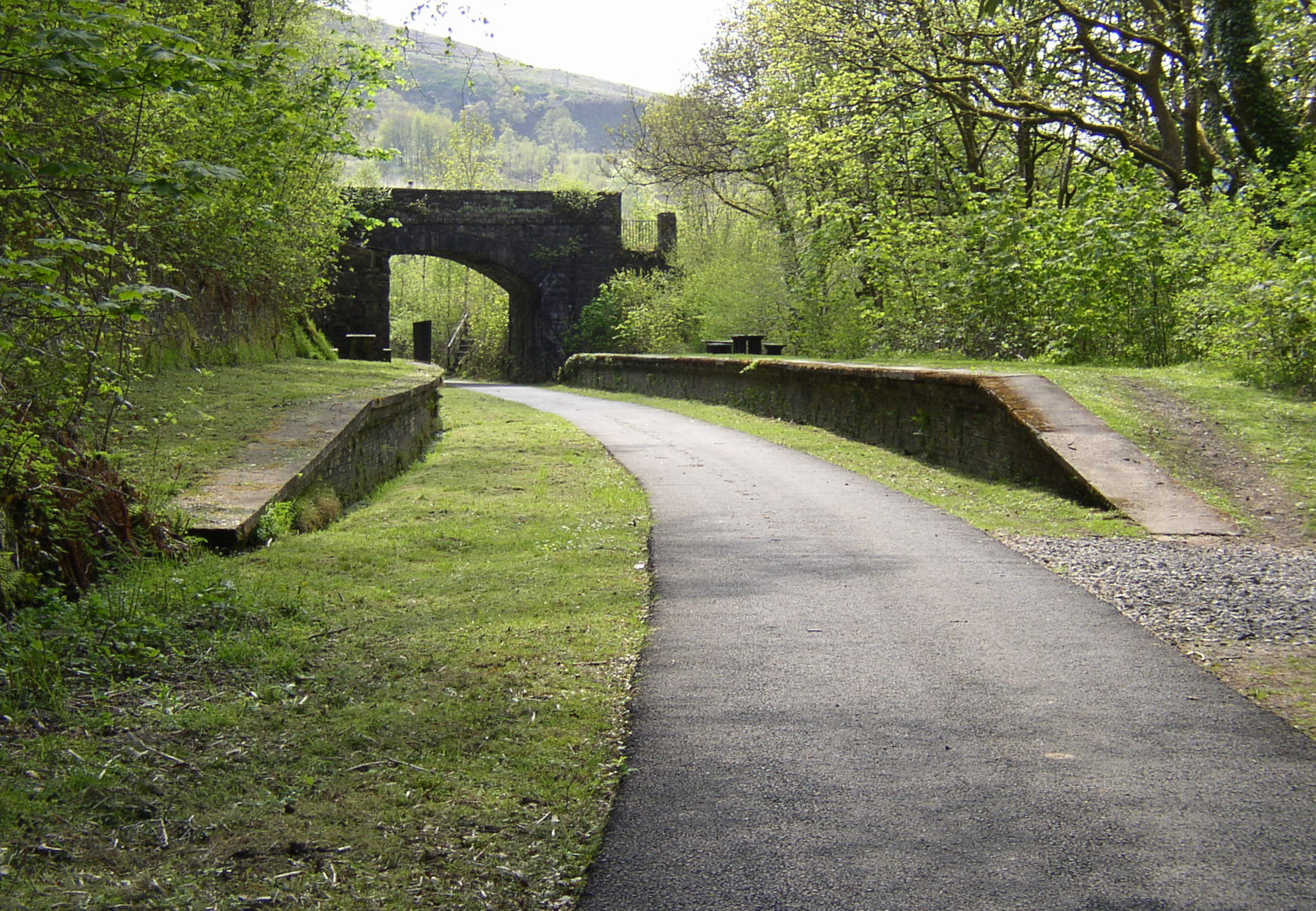
- The site of the station in 2013

General information
- Location: Cynonville, Glamorganshire; Wales
- Coordinates: 51.6433°N 3.706°W
- Grid reference: SS850952
- Platforms: 2

Other information
- Status: Disused

History
- Original company: Rhondda and Swansea Bay Railway
- Pre-grouping: Rhondda and Swansea Bay Railway
- Post-grouping: Great Western Railway

Key dates
- October 1912: Opened to the public
- 2 January 1956: Closed
Location

Cynonville Halt railway station served the village of Cynonville, in the historical county of Glamorganshire, Wales, from 1912 to 1956 on the Rhondda and Swansea Bay Railway.

== History ==
The station was opened in October 1912, although it was open earlier for workers of the nearby Cynon and Argoed collieries. It first appeared as Cynon Colliery and Pontrhydyfen Argoed in the 1899 fare table. It originally had no platforms so workers had to board and alight from the trackside. A platform was built in 1902, the other one being built later. Its name later appeared as Cynon New Pit and it was changed to Cynonville Halt when it opened publicly. It closed on 2 January 1956. The track bed is now a cycle path and the platforms still survive.

Preceding station	Disused railways	Following station
Duffryn Rhondda Halt; Line and station closed	Rhondda and Swansea Bay Railway	Pontrhydyfen; Line and station closed
