= Duffryn Rhondda Halt railway station =

Disused railway station in Duffryn Rhondda, Neath Port Talbot

Duffryn Rhondda Halt

General information
- Location: Duffryn Rhondda, Glamorganshire; Wales
- Coordinates: 51.6481°N 3.6758°W
- Grid reference: SS841957

Other information
- Status: Disused

History
- Original company: Rhondda and Swansea Bay Railway
- Pre-grouping: Rhondda and Swansea Bay Railway
- Post-grouping: Great Western Railway

Key dates
- 10 July 1905: Opened as Duffryn Rhondda Platform
- 2 October 1911: Closed
- October 1912: Reopened as Duffryn Rhondda Halt
- 3 December 1962: Closed to public
- 7 November 1966: closed completely
Location

Duffryn Rhondda Halt railway station served the area of Duffryn Rhondda, in the historical county of Glamorganshire, Wales, from 1905 to 1966 on the Rhondda and Swansea Bay Railway.

== History ==
The station was opened on 10 July 1905 by the Rhondda and Swansea Bay Railway, although it opened earlier to miners in 1898 as Duffryn Rhondda Colliery. It opened to the public on 10 July 1905 as Duffryn Rhondda Platform. It was last shown in the timetable on 2 October 1911 but it reappeared in Bradshaw in October 1912 as Duffryn Rhondda Halt. It closed to the public on 3 December 1962 and closed to miners on 7 November 1966.

Preceding station	Disused railways	Following station
Cymmer Afan; Line and station closed	Rhondda and Swansea Bay Railway	Cynonville Halt; Line and station closed
