= Aberavon Town railway station =

Disused railway station in Aberavon, Neath

Coordinates: 51.59672°N 3.78319°W

Aberavon Town
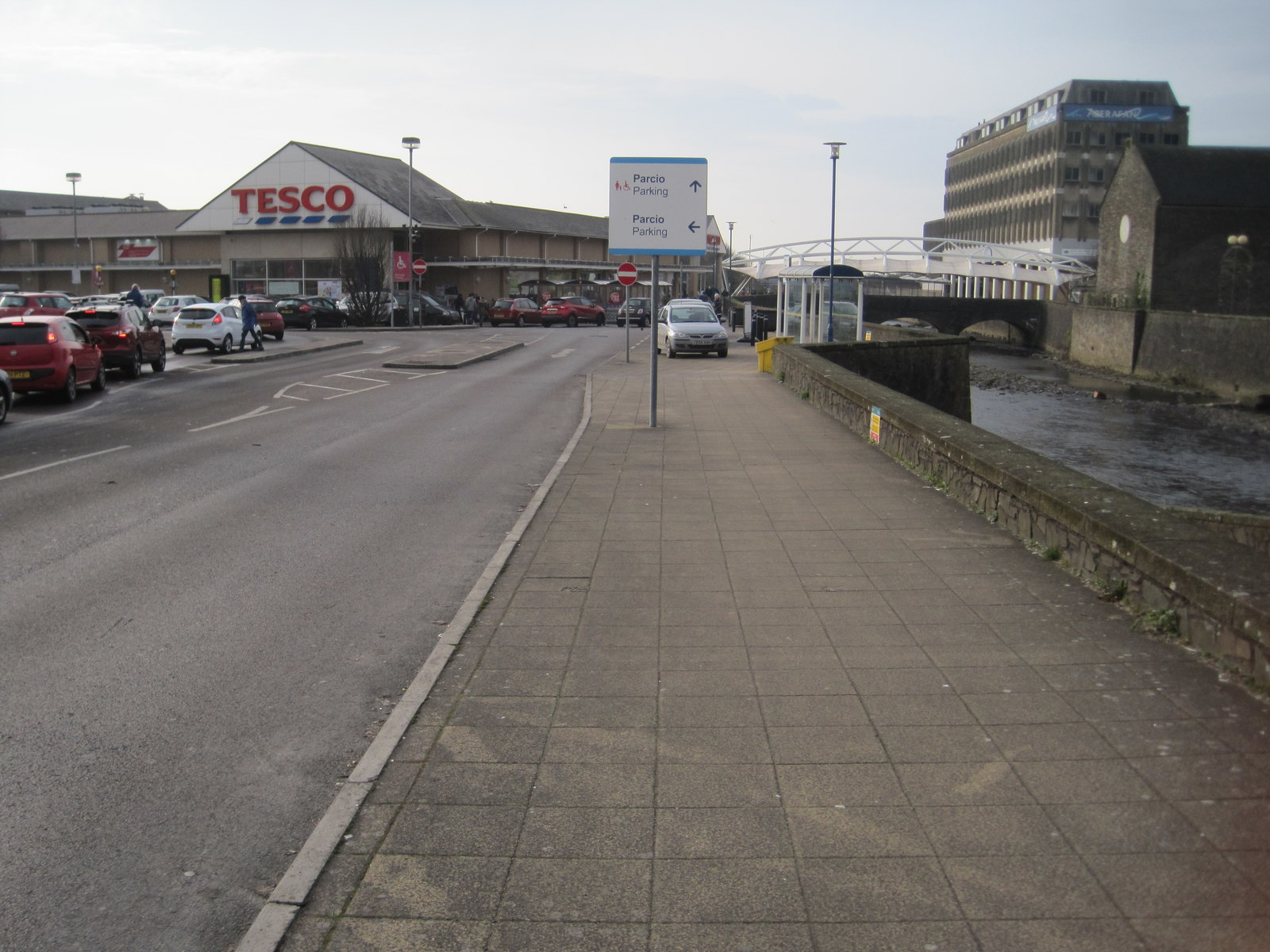
- The site of the station in 2017

General information
- Location: Aberavon, Neath Port Talbot; Wales
- Platforms: 2

Other information
- Status: Disused

History
- Original company: Rhondda and Swansea Bay Railway
- Pre-grouping: Rhondda and Swansea Bay Railway
- Post-grouping: Great Western Railway

Key dates
- 2 November 1885: Station opens as Aberavon
- 1 December 1891: Station renamed Aberavon and Port Talbot
- ?June 1895: Station renamed Port Talbot (Aberavon)
- 1 July 1924: Station renamed Aberavon Town
- 3 December 1962: Station closes
Location

Aberavon Town railway station was a railway station on the Rhondda and Swansea Bay line which ran in the Rhondda Valley and Swansea area on the Welsh coast in the county of Glamorgan. Opened as Aberavon the station's name was changed twice before the emerging as Aberavon Town in 1924.

== History ==
The station was incorporated into the Great Western Railway during the Grouping of 1923, Passing on to the Western Region of British Railways on nationalisation in 1948, it was then closed by the British Transport Commission.

== The site today ==
The station has been completely removed without a trace. The site has now been taken over by a Tesco.

Preceding station	Disused railways	Following station
Aberavon Seaside	Great Western Railway; Rhondda and Swansea Bay Railway	Cwmavon
