= Nantewlaeth Colliery Halt railway station =

Disused railway station in Glyncorrwg, Neath Port Talbot

Nantewlaeth Colliery Halt

General information
- Location: Glyncorrwg, Glamorganshire; Wales
- Coordinates: 51.666165°N 3.645305°W
- Platforms: 1

Other information
- Status: Disused

History
- Original company: Great Western Railway
- Post-grouping: Great Western Railway

Key dates
- 28 October 1940: Opened
- 18 September 1955: Closed
Location

Nantewlaeth Colliery Halt railway station served Nantewlaeth Colliery, located in the village of Glyncorrwg, in the historical county of Glamorganshire, Wales, from 1940 to 1955 on the South Wales Mineral Railway.

== History ==
The station was opened on 28 October 1940 by the Great Western Railway. It was only open to miners. The last train was shown in the timetable on 18 September 1955. The track was removed in 1966.

Preceding station	Disused railways	Following station
Cymmer Corrwg; Line and station closed	Great Western Railway; South Wales Mineral Railway	Glyncorrwg; Line and station closed
