= Bute Merthyr Colliery =

Welsh coal mine active 1851-1926

Coordinates: 51°40′28″N 3°32′30″W

The Bute Merthyr Colliery, in Treherbert in the Rhondda Valley, was the first colliery to produce steam coal in the Rhondda valley. A trial pit was dug in 1851, and the colliery was closed in 1926.

== Opening ==
In 1849, Marquess of Bute bought the Cwmsaerbren farm from William Davies for £12,000. W. S. Clarke was employed to sink the first trial shaft in 1851. In April 1853 the first seam was struck at a depth of 125 yards (114 m). A second shaft had been sunk by 1855, when the first coal was produced. Progress was slow because all equipment was carried over rough tracks by horse and cart from the Taff Vale Railway's then terminus at Dinas.
