= South Pit Halt railway station =

Disused railway station in Glyncorrwg, Neath Port Talbot

South Pit Halt

General information
- Location: Glyncorrwg, Glamorganshire; Wales
- Platforms: 2

Other information
- Status: Disused

History
- Original company: Great Western Railway
- Post-grouping: Great Western Railway

Key dates
- 27 August 1923: Opened
- 2 November 1964: Closed

South Pit Halt railway station served South Pit Colliery, located in the village of Glyncorrwg, in the historical county of Glamorganshire, Wales, from 1923 to 1964 on the South Wales Mineral Railway.

== History ==
The station was opened as Glyncorrwg South Pit on 27 August 1923 by the Great Western Railway. Its name was later changed to South Pit Halt. It was open to miners only. It was relocated to the south in 1956 with new private sidings. The station closed on 2 November 1964. The colliery itself closed in 1970.

Preceding station	Disused railways	Following station
Glyncorrwg; Line and station closed	Great Western Railway; South Wales Mineral Railway	North Rhondda Halt; Line and station closed
