= Aberavon (disambiguation) =

Aberavon is a settlement and community in Neath Port Talbot county borough, Wales.

Aberavon may also refer to:

- Aberavon (UK Parliament constituency)
- Aberavon (electoral ward), in Baglan and Baglan Bay
- Aberavon (Senedd constituency)
- Aberavon (Seaside) railway station
