= Glyncorrwg railway station =

Disused railway station in Glyncorrwg, Neath Port Talbot

Glyncorrwg

General information
- Location: Glyncorrwg, Glamorganshire; Wales
- Coordinates: 51.6807°N 3.6275°W
- Grid reference: SS792978
- Platforms: 1

Other information
- Status: Disused

History
- Original company: South Wales Mineral Railway
- Post-grouping: Great Western Railway

Key dates
- March 1918: Opened
- 22 September 1930: Closed to passengers
- 1960s: Closed to goods
Location

Glyncorrwg railway station served the village of Glyncorrwg, in the historic county of Glamorganshire, Wales, from 1918 to the 1960s on the South Wales Mineral Railway.

== History ==
The station was opened in March 1918 by the South Wales Mineral Railway. To the east was a siding that served a mine. The station closed to passengers on 22 September 1930 and closed to goods traffic in the 1960s.

Preceding station	Disused railways	Following station
Nantewlaeth Colliery Halt; Line and station closed	South Wales Mineral Railway	South Pit Halt; Line and station closed
