= Cymmer Afan railway station =

Disused railway station in Cymmer, Neath Port Talbot

Cymmer Afan
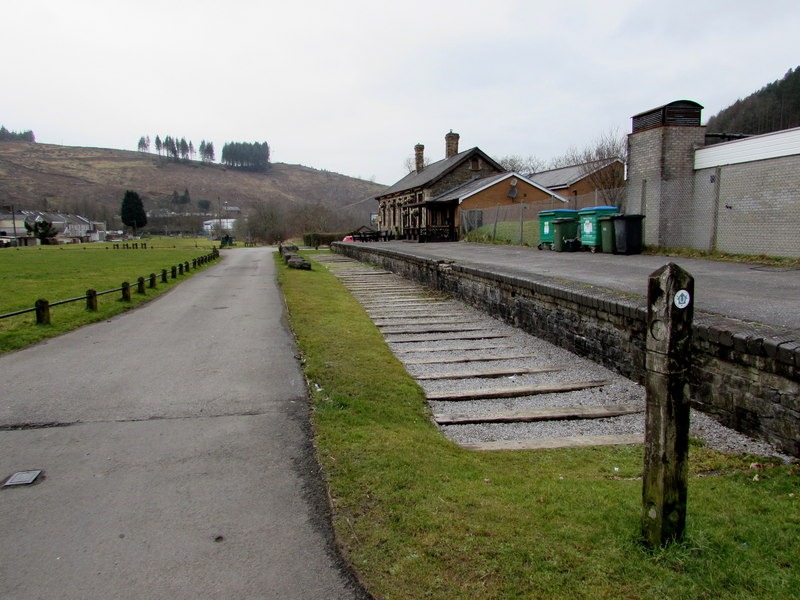
- The site of the station in 2015

General information
- Location: Cymmer, Glamorganshire; Wales
- Coordinates: 51.6529°N 3.6490°W
- Grid reference: SS860961
- Platforms: 2

Other information
- Status: Disused

History
- Original company: Rhondda and Swansea Bay Railway
- Pre-grouping: Rhondda and Swansea Bay Railway
- Post-grouping: Great Western Railway

Key dates
- 2 November 1885: Opened as Cymmer
- 1888: Replaced
- 1 July 1924: Name changed to Cwm Cymmer
- 17 September 1926: Name changed to Cymmer Afan
- January 1950: Amalgamated with Cymmer General
- 22 June 1970: Closed for regular passenger services (except school trains)
- 14 July 1970: closed completely
Location

Cymmer Afan railway station served the village of Cymmer, in the historical county of Glamorganshire, Wales, from 1885 to 1970 on the Rhondda and Swansea Bay Railway.

== History ==
The station was opened as Cymmer on 2 November 1885 by the Rhondda and Swansea Bay Railway. It was a temporary station, being replaced in 1888 by a station of the same name. It was renamed Cwm Cymmer on 1 July 1924 and renamed again on 17 September 1926 to Cymmer Afan, to distinguish it from Cymmer Corrwg. It amalgamated with the nearby Cymmer General railway station in January 1950. The station closed to passengers on 22 June 1970 but it was later used by schools until 14 July 1970.

Preceding station	Disused railways	Following station
Blaengwynfi; Line and station closed	Rhondda and Swansea Bay Railway	Duffryn Rhondda Halt; Line and station closed
