= Blaengwynfi railway station =

Disused railway station in Blaengwynfi, Neath Port Talbot

Blaengwynfi
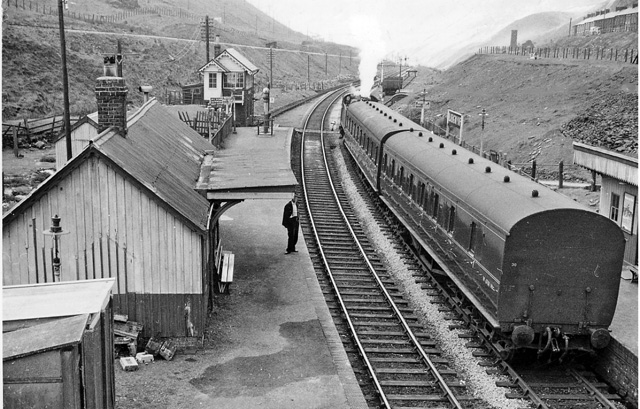
- The station, looking west towards Cymmer, in 1962

General information
- Location: Blaengwynfi, Neath Port Talbot; Wales
- Coordinates: 51.6588°N 3.6086°W
- Grid reference: SS887967
- Platforms: 2

Other information
- Status: Disused

History
- Original company: Rhondda and Swansea Bay Railway
- Pre-grouping: Rhondda and Swansea Bay Railway
- Post-grouping: Great Western Railway

Key dates
- 10 May 1890: Opened
- 26 February 1968: Closed to passengers
- 14 December 1970: Closed to goods
Location

Blaengwynfi railway station served the village of Blaengwynfi, Neath Port Talbot, Wales, from 1890 to 1968 on the Rhondda and Swansea Bay Railway.

== History ==
The station was opened on 10 May 1890 by the Rhondda and Swansea Bay Railway. It was known as Blaen Gwynfi and Blaen-Gwynfi in Bradshaw until 1936 and Blaen Gwynfy on the tickets and in the timetable until 1904. It closed to passengers on 26 February 1968 because the Rhondda Tunnel was deemed unsafe. It closed to goods on 14 December 1970.

The nearby Abergwynfi railway station was on the Great Western Railway.

Preceding station	Disused railways	Following station
Blaenrhondda; Line and station closed	Rhondda and Swansea Bay Railway	Cymmer Afan; Line and station closed
