= Cwmavon Glam railway station =

Disused railway station in Cwmafan, Neath Port Talbot

Cwmavon Glam
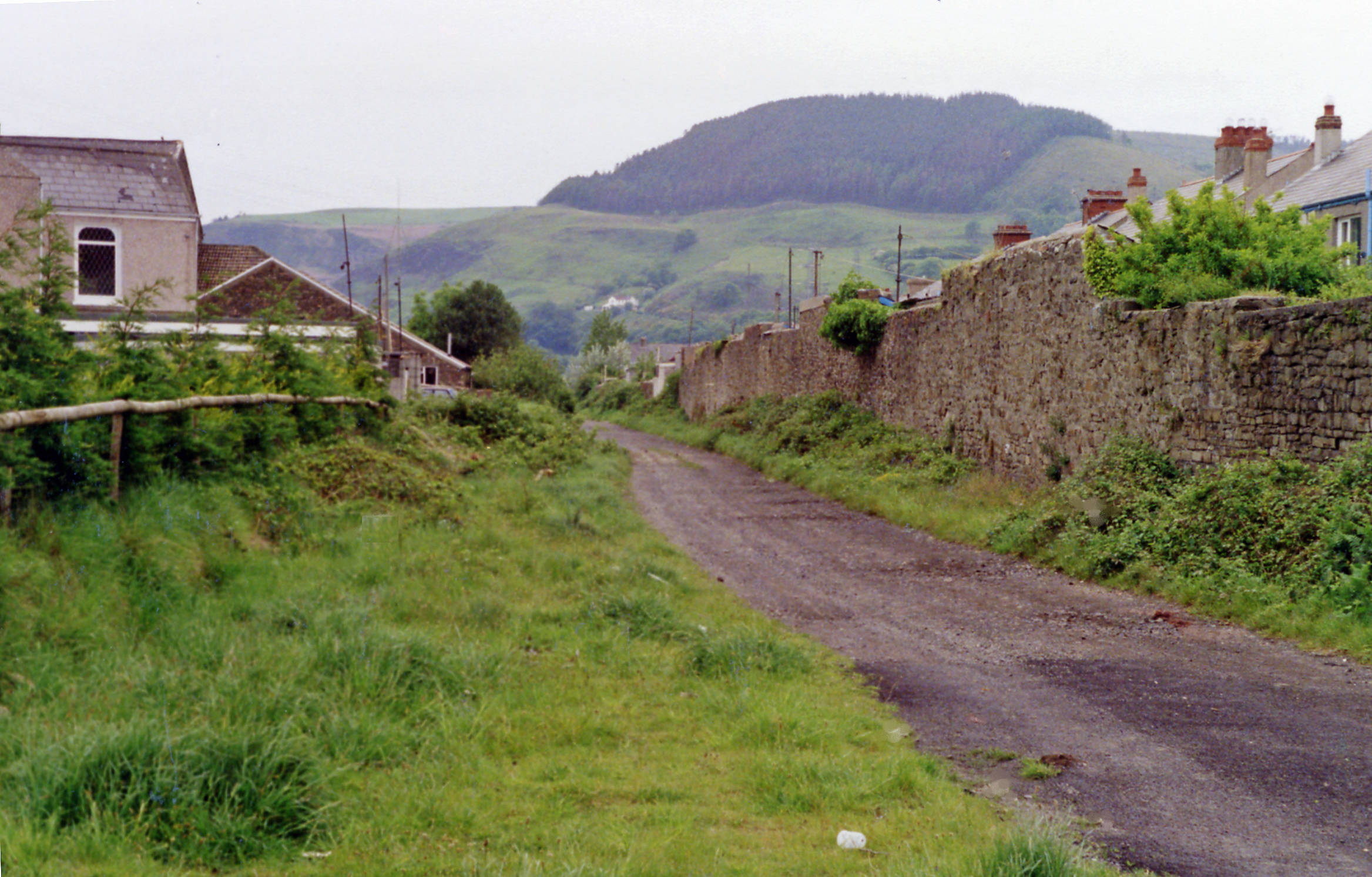
- The site of the station, looking southwest towards Aberavon, in 1990

General information
- Location: Cwmafan, Glamorganshire; Wales
- Coordinates: 51.6155°N 3.7577°W
- Grid reference: SS784922
- Platforms: 2

Other information
- Status: Disused

History
- Original company: Rhondda and Swansea Bay Railway
- Pre-grouping: Rhondda and Swansea Bay Railway
- Post-grouping: Great Western Railway

Key dates
- 25 June 1885: Opened as Cwmavon
- 1 January 1902: Name changed to Cwmavon Glam
- 3 December 1962: Closed to passengers
- 2 November 1964: Closed
Location

Cwmavon Glam railway station served the village of Cwmafan, in the historical county of Glamorganshire, Wales, from 1885 to 1964 on the Rhondda and Swansea Bay Railway.

== History ==
The station was opened on 25 June 1885 by the Rhondda and Swansea Bay Railway. It was also known as Cwm Avon in the timetables and tickets until 1904. Its name was changed to Cwmavon Glam on 2 January 1902 to avoid confusion with Cwmavon Mon. The station closed to passengers on 3 December 1962 and closed to goods on 2 November 1964.

| Preceding station | Disused railways | Following station |
|---|---|---|
| Pontrhydyfen; Line and station closed | Rhondda and Swansea Bay Railway | Aberavon Town; Line and station closed |
