= Swing Bridge, River Neath =

Neath River Swing Bridge
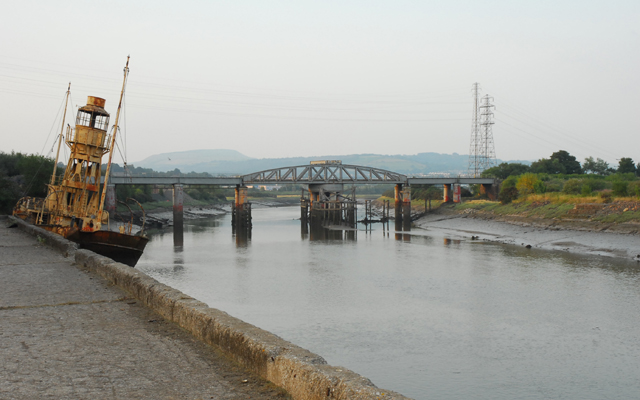
- This swing bridge (permanently locked) carries the current Swansea District Line and the former Rhondda and Swansea Bay Railway over the River Neath near Skewen
- Coordinates: 51°39′06″N 3°50′13″W
- OS grid reference: SS73029636
- Carries: Swansea District Line
- Crosses: River Neath
- Locale: Neath, Port Talbot, Wales

Characteristics
- Design: swing bridge
- Longest span: 180 ft (55 m)

History
- Opened: 1892

Statistics

Listed Building – Grade II
- Official name: Neath River Swing Bridge
- Designated: 5 January 1989
- Reference no.: 23310

Location
- Interactive map of Neath River Swing Bridge

The Neath River Swing Bridge is a swing bridge over the River Neath, in Wales. It carried the former Rhondda and Swansea Bay Railway near Skewen. The bridge was constructed as a result of the Rhondda and Swansea Bay Railway Act 1892, which aimed to provide access along the length of the river from wharves and jetties down past Briton Ferry.

The River Neath Bridge has three steel approach spans on the west side and two on the east. They are of plate girder construction, and of through type, supported on piers that each consists of a pair of cylindrical columns, either of wrought iron or steel plate, which are connected by horizontal and cross bracing. The total length of the bridge is 388 feet (118 m).

The 180-foot-long opening span (55 m) is pivoted centrally on a pier of six cylindrical columns similar to those that form the piers to the approach spans, but placed in a ring. They are capped by a large cylindrical drum that contains the supporting rails and the operating mechanism. The swinging span is 27 ft wide (8.2 m).

After many years of decline, however, the swing-bridge facility was hardly ever used. In total, it was used 14 times in 1947, three times in 1948, only once in 1949, and once again in 1956. The last operation was only for testing purposes, at the request of the Neath harbour commissioners. In recent times, the bridge suffered vandalism. A serious fire destroyed its dynamos and pumps, evidence of which is still visible in the steelwork.

On 19 March 1985, the British Railways Board proposed to cease operating the swing-bridge over the River Neath, a move that was considered controversial in South Wales. The Board believed that maintaining the fiction of a swing-bridge presented BR with a cost that is no longer justified.

Despite the bridge being welded shut to permanently lock it, with much of the original R&SB railway route now closed, the section incorporating the Neath river crossing still exists, now forming part of a diversionary goods and any passenger traffic routing over the Swansea District Line. As at 2021, the swing bridge had (has) to pass all east-bound coal traffic originating (sporadically) from Ryan's coal plant at Blaengwrach in the Neath Valley and earlier, Blaenant colliery (now defunct) and still (2021) that of washery coal traffic to & from Onllwyn in the Dulais Valley on the former Neath & Brecon Branch. All such traffic has to travel from those valleys to Jersey Marine South Junction for reversal up the Rhondda & Swansea Bay Branch to Dynevor Junction immediately west of the swing bridge to then transit eastbound. Apart from some track at Court Sart Junction at Briton Ferry, the R&SB line or what is left of it, runs from Dynevor Junction to Burrows Sidings east of Kings Dock Swansea.
