= Blaenrhondda =

Coordinates: 51.6847°N 3.5514°W

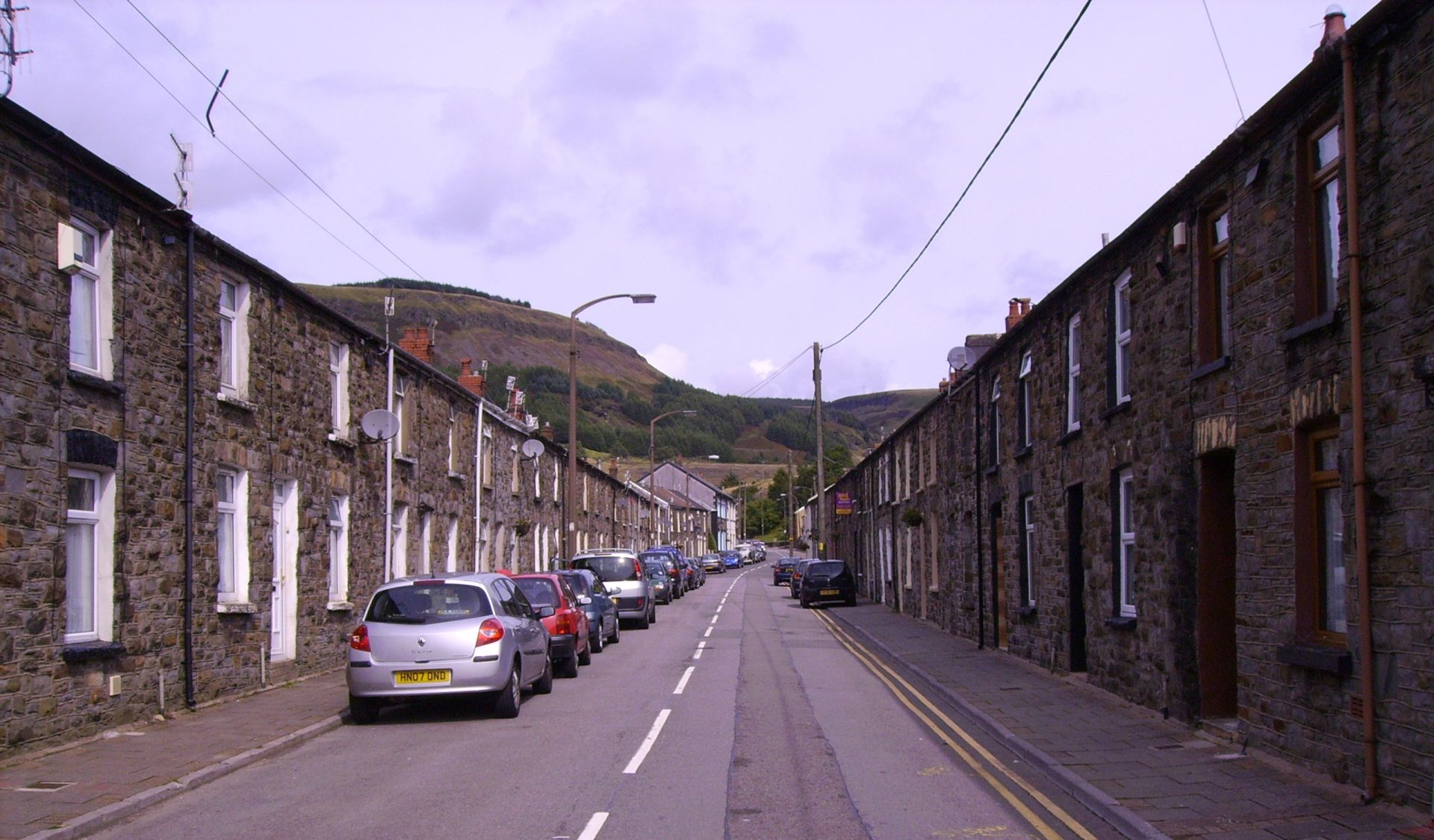

- Location within Rhondda Cynon Taf
- OS grid reference: SS928995
- Principal area: Rhondda Cynon Taf
- Preserved county: Mid Glamorgan
- Country: Wales
- Sovereign state: United Kingdom
- Post town: TREORCHY
- Postcode district: CF42
- Dialling code: 01443
- Police: South Wales
- Fire: South Wales
- Ambulance: Welsh
- UK Parliament: Rhondda and Ogmore
- Senedd Cymru – Welsh Parliament: Rhondda

Blaenrhondda is a village in the county borough of Rhondda Cynon Taf, Wales, lying at the head the Rhondda Fawr valley. Blaenrhondda is a village and is part of the community of Treherbert.

== History ==
The earliest evidence of people inhabiting the area are the remains of an Iron Age settlement of several roundhouses grouped together in an obvious community, known as Hen Dre'r Mynydd. The dry wall layout of the ruinous site has led archaeologists to believe that the people who lived in the area were early farmers. It has been identified as the largest undefended Iron Age settlement in south east Wales.

Before the industrialisation of the Rhondda Valleys in the late 19th century, Blaenrhondda was an agricultural area and sparsely populated. With the coming of the coal industry two mines were sunk in the locality. The first was the North Dunraven, also known as the Blaenrhondda, sunk in 1859, followed by Fernhill Colliery around 1871. The Dunraven closed in the 1920s but the Fernhill was still operating as late as 1978. In an attempt to break the monopoly of the Taff Vale Railway and the Cardiff docks, the Rhondda Tunnel was constructed through Mynydd Blaengwynfy to link up with the Rhondda and Swansea Bay Railway to supply coal to the Swansea Docks for export. The resulting tunnel, at a length of 3,300 yards was the longest rail tunnel in Wales and the seventh longest in Britain. Due to an issue with the weight the engines could pull, the rail link was never the success it was hoped to be, though it did prove popular with day-trippers from the Rhondda, visiting Swansea and the Gower. The station was closed in 1970.

In the hills above Blaenrhondda lies Blaenrhondda Road Cutting, a Site of Special Scientific Interest. It was given this status for its rock exposures showing sediments that formed on the flood plain of a river delta during the Carboniferous period, approximately 310 million years ago.
