= Blaenrhondda Road Cutting =

Protected area in Glamorgan, Wales

Coordinates: 51.69583°N 3.54865°W

Blaenrhondda Road Cutting is a Site of Special Scientific Interest in Glamorgan, south Wales.

Located along the A4061 road above the village of Blaenrhondda, Rhondda, the Blaenrhondda Road Cutting is of special interest for its rock exposures showing sediments that formed on the flood plain of a river delta during the Carboniferous period, approximately 310 million years ago.

== See also ==
- List of Sites of Special Scientific Interest in Mid & South Glamorgan
