= Cymmer Corrwg railway station =

Disused railway station in Cymmer, Neath Port Talbot

Cymmer Corrwg

General information
- Location: Cymmer, Glamorgan; Wales
- Coordinates: 51.654051°N 3.649699°W
- Platforms: 1

Other information
- Status: Disused

History
- Original company: South Wales Mineral Railway
- Post-grouping: Great Western Railway

Key dates
- March 1918: Opened as Cymmer
- 17 September 1926: Name changed to Cymmer Corrwg
- 22 September 1930: Closed to passengers
- 1955: Closed to goods
Location

Cymmer Corrwg railway station served the village of Cymmer, in the historical county of Glamorganshire, Wales, from 1918 to 1964 on the South Wales Mineral Railway.

== History ==
The station was opened in March 1918 by the South Wales Mineral Railway. Its name was changed to Cymmer Corrwg on 17 September 1926 to avoid confusion with the other two Cymmer stations. It was closed to regular passenger traffic on 22 September 1930 but it remained open for miners until 1964.

Preceding station	Disused railways	Following station
Briton Ferry; Line closed, station open	South Wales Mineral Railway	Nantewlaeth Colliery Halt; Line and station closed
