= Treherbert =

Village in Rhondda Cynon Taf, Wales

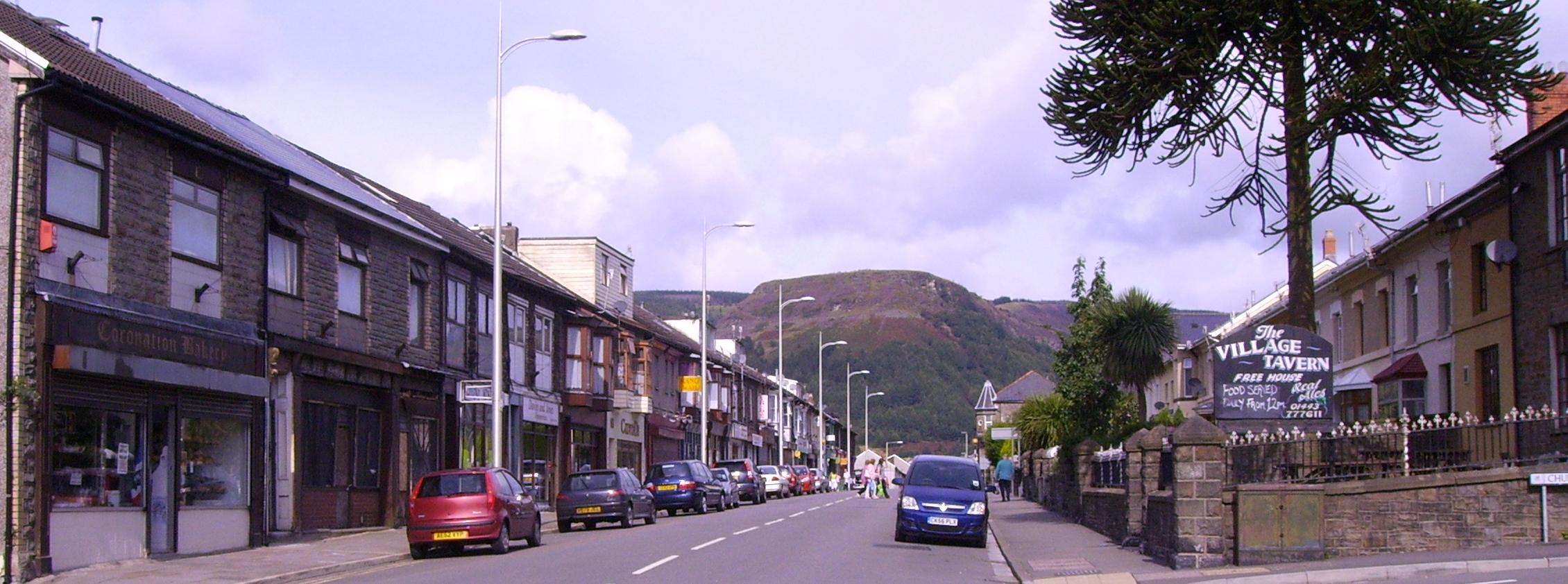
- Bute Street, Treherbert (2008)

- Location within Rhondda Cynon Taf
- Population: 5,727 (2011)
- OS grid reference: SS936985
- Principal area: Rhondda Cynon Taf
- Preserved county: Mid Glamorgan
- Country: Wales
- Sovereign state: United Kingdom
- Post town: Treorchy
- Postcode district: CF42
- Dialling code: 01443
- Police: South Wales
- Fire: South Wales
- Ambulance: Welsh
- UK Parliament: Rhondda
- Senedd Cymru – Welsh Parliament: Rhondda
- List of places UK Wales Rhondda Cynon Taf 51.6722°N 3.5306°W Community map: Map of the community

Treherbert (Welsh pronunciation) is a village and community situated at the head of the Rhondda Fawr valley in the county borough of Rhondda Cynon Taf, Wales. Historically part of Glamorgan. Treherbert is the upper most community of the Rhondda Fawr and encompasses the districts of Blaencwm, Blaenrhondda, Tynewydd and Pen-yr-englyn.

== Toponymy ==
'Tre[f]' means 'town', and is derived from the word for a settlement, hamlet, or town. 'Herbert' refers to the surname of the Earls of Pembroke.

== History ==
There is evidence of settlements in the Rhondda dating back to Celtic times, but prior to the Industrial Revolution and the advent of coal mining the villages of Treherbert, Tynewydd, Blaenrhondda and Blaencwm consisted of a number of isolated rural farms and scattered homesteads. In 1841 there were only 218 people residing in the 'Middle hamlet of Treherbert', which had risen to 1,203 by 1861.

In August 1845, the trustees of the Marquess of Bute bought the Cwmsaerbren farm from William Davies for a fee of £11,000 to sink the first steam coal pit in the Rhondda valley. A trial pit was sunk from 1850, but progress was slow because all equipment was carried over rough tracks by horse and cart from the Taff Vale Railway's then terminus at Dinas. In April 1853 the first seam of what was called the Bute Merthyr Colliery was struck at a depth of 125 yards, and production was begun in early 1855.

Parish records showed the first use of the name Treherbert from January 1855, commemorating the Herbert earls of Pembroke, one of the ancestors of the Marquess of Bute. The first 38 wagons of steam coal were transported from the newly extended Taff Vale Railway station at Gelligaled (Ystrad) to Cardiff Docks on 21 December 1855. Installation of the railway line facilitated the rapid expansion of the village, and the need to build new houses, the first rows of which were built at Bute Street, Dumfries Street, and Baglan Street.

== Transport ==
The main road in the northerly direction out of Treherbert is the A4061 Rhigos Mountain Road towards Hirwaun and the A465 Heads of the Valleys Road. It was built as a relief project for unemployed miners and opened in November 1929.

=== Railway ===
Treherbert railway station is the last stop on the Transport for Wales Rhondda Line, which runs from Cardiff. Prior to the Dr Beeching plans in the 1960s the railway line continued from Treherbert through Tynewydd to Blaencwm. From here it turned left at Pen Pych into Blaencwm. In Blaencwm, the line descended into a single-track tunnel under Mynydd Blaengwynfi, emerging in the village of Blaengwynfi in the nearby Afan valley. The journey took approximately 8 minutes.

== Sport ==
Treherbert is home to rugby union club Treherbert RFC. The team is a member of the Welsh Rugby Union and was founded by local colliers in 1879.

Treherbert also produced one of Wales' first rugby league teams, Treherbert RLFC, playing for just two seasons between 1908 and 1910.

Treherbert is also home to Welsh darts player Wayne Warren.

== Music ==
Treherbert Band is one of the longest established bands in the South Wales area. It was originally formed around 1897 as Treherbert Drum and Fife Band, later becoming a brass band associated with the Glenrhondda Colliery. Following the closure of the colliery, the band continued but was renamed variously the Upper Rhondda Band, Treherbert & District Silver Band, Treherbert Band, and now Treherbert & District Band.
