= Rhondda Tunnel =

Railway tunnel in South Wales

Coordinates: 51.668°N 3.588°W

The Rhondda Tunnel is an abandoned railway tunnel that runs between the Rhondda and the Afan Valleys in South Wales. It is 3,443 yards (3,148 m) long, making it the third longest railway tunnel in Wales, and the seventeenth longest in the United Kingdom.

The tunnel, constructed by the Rhondda and Swansea Bay Railway, was engineered by Sydney William Yockney. In June 1885, construction commenced from Blaencwm in the Rhondda Valley and Blaengwynfi in the Afan Valley. Progress slowed because of manpower shortages and water seepage. Progress was restored when the original contractor, William Jones, was replaced by Lucas and Aird, who brought in more men. Completed on 2 July 1890, the tunnel has a single 58-foot (18 m) ventilation shaft around 105 yards (96 m) from its western end. It is almost 1,000 feet (300 m) feet below the surface at its deepest point. The tunnel's single track line split into double track on either side of its portals.

Within decades of opening, the tunnel lining became distorted because of mining activity in the close vicinity. Between 1938 and 1953, around 500 steel ribs were installed to address the issue but it continued to deteriorate and speed limits were imposed. In 1969, the tunnel was closed temporarily on safety grounds. In December 1970, the Ministry of Transport closed the tunnel permanently, rather than financing repairs. In 1980, both entrances were filled. During the 2010s, the tunnel was surveyed with the intention of reopening it as a cycleway.

== History ==
=== Construction ===
During much of the 1800s, the rich coal deposits of the Rhondda were important to the local economy. By the 1870s, the volume of coal being extracted threatened to exceed the capacities of the Taff Vale and Cardiff Docks Railways. A typical return journey that took two days because of congestion and inadequate handling was a hindrance to customers, particularly the coal shipping facilities at Swansea. There was a demand for another railway line to relieve the situation. The Rhondda & Swansea Bay Railway (R&SBR) was incorporated on 10 August 1882. It established a shorter route to Swansea via the Afan Valley passing through the 1,700-foot-high (520 m) Mynydd Blaengwyfni.

Sydney William Yockney was employed to engineer the route. He had connections to tunnel engineering through his father, Samuel Hansard Yockney, who was engineer for the construction of Box Tunnel on the Great Western Railway and worked for Isambard Kingdom Brunel on other tunnel projects. The contract for the section of line that included the Rhondda Tunnel was awarded to Neath-based contractor William Jones and William Sutcliffe Marsh was the resident engineer. As of 2016, the Rhondda Tunnel is the second longest in Wales at 3,443 yards (3,148 m).

On 30 May 1885, the ground was broken for the tunnel which was expected to be completed in three years. Progress was hindered by land purchase at the eastern end of the line that took 15 months to resolve. Early reports by Yockney to the R&SBR's directors were positive, ground conditions were favourable and there was little water ingress. The tunnellers who worked from shafts driven into either end of the approach cuttings were equipped with compressed air-powered rock drills and were boring into the sandstone at 240 yards (220 m) per month. Because of the tunnel's depth, in excess of 900 feet (270 m), intermediate shafts to speed construction were discounted.

The tunnellers faced dire conditions, resulting in injuries and deaths, several due to rock falls and explosions. By 1887, the tunnelling had slowed to 70 yards (64 m) per month which was attributed to a shortage of men and underground springs. The completion date was moved to 31 July 1889. The headings met on 16 March 1889 and were perfectly aligned, but the delays led to William Jones being stripped of the contract in favour of Westminster-based Lucas and Aird in September 1889.

The new contractor brought 1,600 men on site and 300 more houses were built at the Rhondda side. Electric lighting was installed in the tunnel and progress was restored. On 2 May 1890, the Rhondda Tunnel was inspected by Colonel Rich of the Board of Trade. He said the tunnel should have been fully lined and would not authorise its use for passenger traffic until it was done. The contractors installed 759 yards (694 m) of brick arch above the arched concrete sidewalls which took less than 54 days because Lucas and Aird had anticipated such a requirement.

=== Operation ===
On 2 July 1890, the Rhondda Tunnel was opened. The R&SBR had failed to purchase adjacent coal seams above and below the tunnel which was common practice to prevent other parties from mining and damaging the tunnel. Within decades the seams were exploited and the tunnel began to distort.

Between 1938 and 1953, around 500 steel ribs were installed to resist pressure which was causing inward movement of the side walls and pushing-up of the crown particularly towards eastern end. It did not solve the problem and a settlement of 15 inches (38 cm) was recorded over a 12-year period. More problems were caused by substantial water penetration from underground springs which weakened and washed out the mortar between bricks in places. Several lengths of arch were relined when sections of brickwork became loose and fell onto the track. Speed restrictions were imposed to guard against the threat posed by a collision with debris.

A survey in 1967 revealed severe distortion around the middle of the tunnel close to a geological fault. The rate of deterioration was so severe that the inspector closed the tunnel to traffic on safety grounds. On 26 February 1968, it was closed as a temporary measure, whilst a decision was made on the future of the line.

In December 1970, the Ministry of Transport announced the withdrawal of passenger services via the tunnel, citing a decline in usage and the provision of a bus service. The ministry deemed the estimated cost of repair at £90,000 was prohibitive. This conveniently coincided with the Beeching cuts and stations either side of the tunnel, (Blaenrhondda and Blaengwynfi), were closed at the same time. Following a decade of disuse, in 1980, both portals were covered over and landscaped to prevent unauthorised intrusions, which had become commonplace since its closure.

== Rhondda Tunnel Society ==
The Rhondda Tunnel Society was formed in September 2014. Its short-term goal was to replace the tunnel's portal stone, above the entrance of the tunnel at Blaencwm. The Blaengwynfi portal stone is in the Afan Forest Park.

In the long term, the society aims to raise money to reopen the tunnel as a cycle path. In September 2017 the society was awarded a £90,000 grant from the Pen y Cymoedd Wind Farm Community Fund to allow three surveys of the tunnel to be undertaken:

- A survey into the defects of the tunnel, with estimates of the cost of repairs.
- A geotechnical survey looking at the materials used to seal both ends of the tunnel.
- A survey of the land which is marked to receive the excavated material. It is hoped this can be used to level ground and create space for camping, car parking and a visitors' centre.

In May 2018, the tunnel was opened up so that surveys could take place. Balfour Beatty declared that 95% of the tunnel is in as good a condition as when it opened, and the tunnel could potentially be reopened. National Highways is responsible for the tunnel and is unwilling to reopen it but is willing to transfer ownership to the Welsh government or local authorities. Rhondda Cynon Taf Council announced in July 2018 that it was working with Neath Port Talbot and Merthyr Tydfil Councils to secure the reopening of the tunnel.

The UK government transport secretary, Grant Shapps announced in December 2021 that he would be happy to hand over ownership and control of the tunnel to the local council, Welsh government or a local group.

In January 2026 a planning application from the Society was approved by Rhondda Cynon Taf (RCT) Council for the excavation of land to expose the Blaencwm portal of the Rhondda Tunnel. The Society has said the proposals are considered to mark the first steps in the long-term strategic objective of unlocking the Rhondda Tunnel to allow for pedestrian and cycle access between the Rhondda and Upper Afan Valley.

If the project is successful, it will become the longest cycle tunnel in Europe and the second longest in the world after the 4,000-metre (4,400 yd) Snoqualmie Tunnel in Washington state.
