= The Cardiff Times =

Welsh weekly newspaper

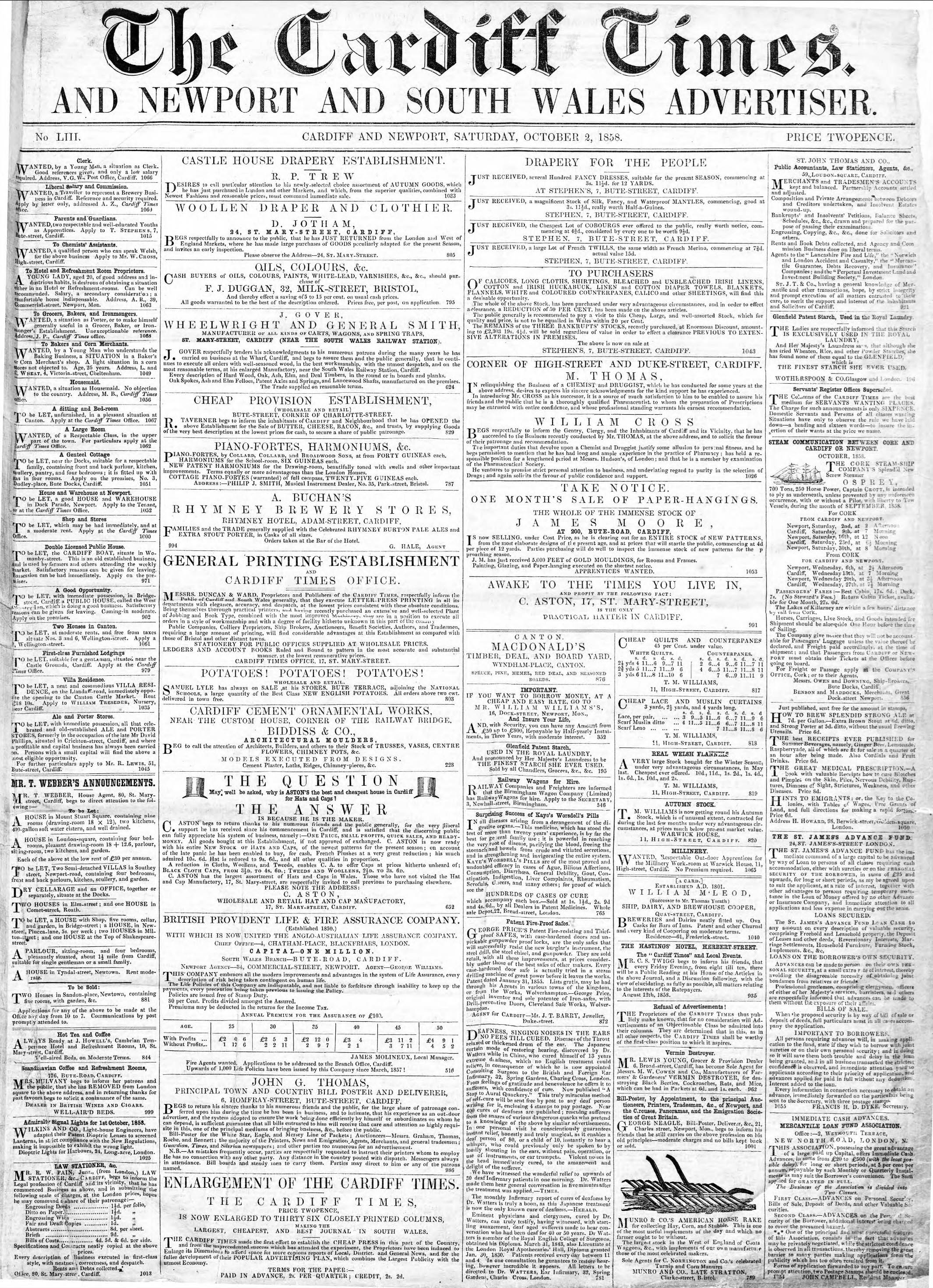
- Front page of the earliest surviving copy, dated 2 October 1858
- Type: Weekly newspaper
- Owners: Duncan & Sons (1857–1928); Robert William John (1930–1955)
- Founder: David Duncan
- Editor: Beriah Gwynfe Evans
- Launched: 2 October 1858
- Ceased publication: 1928
- Relaunched: 1930–1955
- City: Cardiff
- Country: Wales
- OCLC number: 751667788

The Cardiff Times was a Welsh newspaper that was published from 1857 to 1928 and again from 1930 to 1955. From 1857 until 1928 it was owned by Duncan & Sons, and circulated in the County of Glamorgan, Monmouthshire, Carmarthenshire, Pembrokeshire, Cardiganshire, Brecknockshire, Radnorshire, Montgomeryshire and adjacent counties of England. It was a liberal newspaper published in English and for the first forty years its main content was news about liberalism. Among its contributors were William Abraham (Mabon, 1842–1922). It had a sister paper, the daily South Wales Daily News, while the Western Mail and The Weekly Mail were its conservative-supporting rivals.

== History ==
The city of Cardiff began to grow rapidly from 1830 due to the Industrial Revolution, as a series of new docks were built to handle the growing South Wales trade in iron and coal, bringing international seafarers into the city. Despite this growth the city did not have its own dedicated newspaper, with The Silurian (published in Brecon) and the Merthyr Guardian, both weekly newspapers with low readership, being the only news publications in the area.

The Cardiff Times was the first Cardiff-based newspaper to be created, launched by Cardiff alderman David Duncan in October 1857. In its early years it was supportive of the Liberal Party and liberal causes, declaring its mission to "deliver the borough from the degrading position of being a mere appanage of the Bute Estate", a reference to Bute family, who controlled much of the city at that time. In 1868, following the defeat of their local candidate in the general election and taking advantage of a significant reduction in the cost of newspaper production, the Conservative Party decided to launch their own rival paper, the Western Mail, controlled by the Bute trustees and circulating daily. Faced with growing competition from the Western Mail, Duncan launched a sister paper to the Times, called the South Wales Daily News in 1872. The Weekly Mail responded by launching its own weekly to rival the Cardiff Times.

In 1886, the Times expanded its coverage such that in addition to liberal political issues, it also featured serialised fiction and contributions from poets and bards, including William Abraham, better known by his bardic name "Mabon".

The Cardiff Times stopped publishing on 1 September 1928, before being revived in 1930 by the publisher Robert William John. It stopped publishing permanently in 1955.
