= Aberavon Seaside railway station =

Disused railway station in Aberavon, Neath

Coordinates: 51.59432°N 3.79926°W

Aberavon (Seaside)
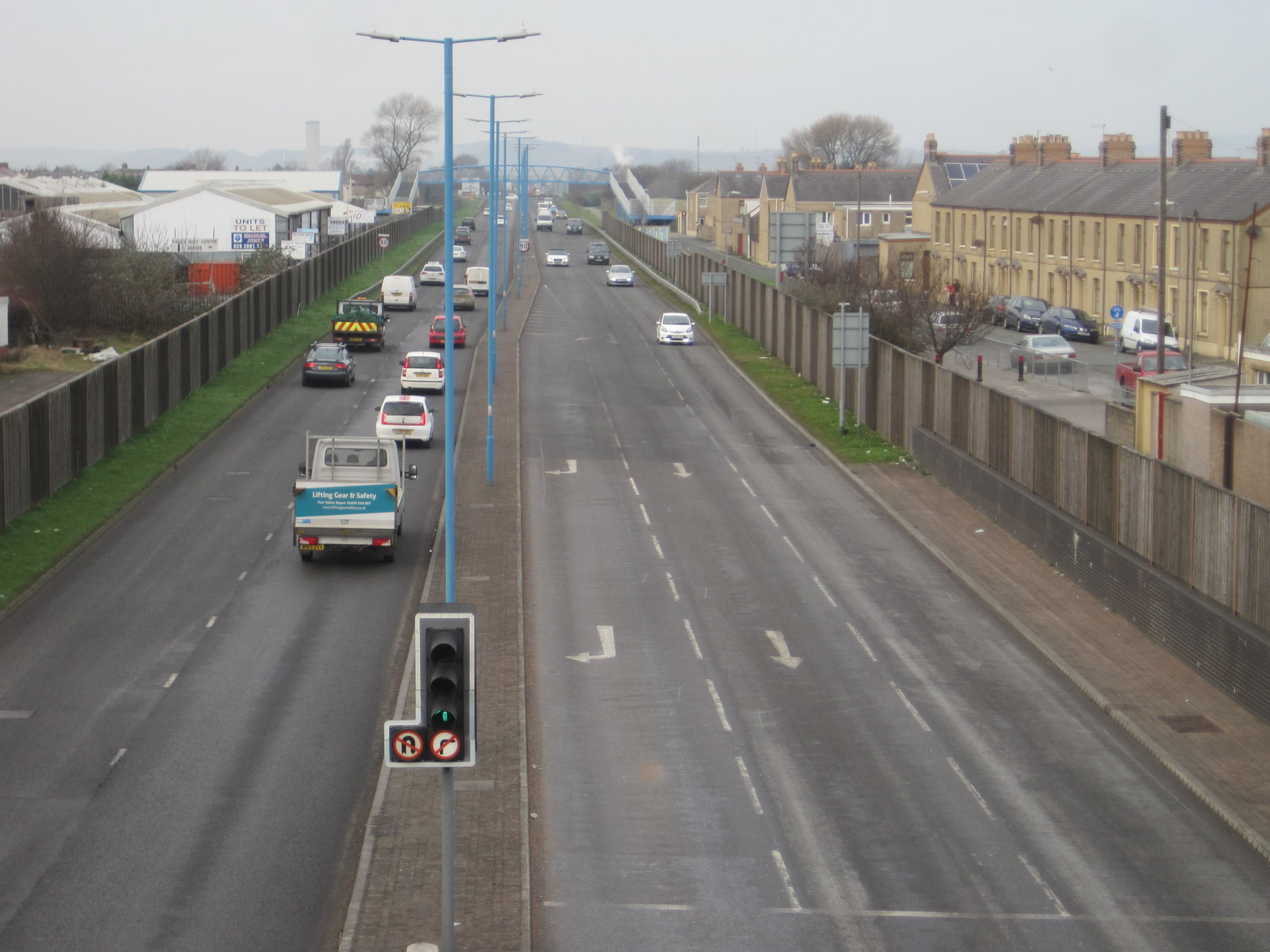
- The site of the station in 2017

General information
- Location: Aberavon, Neath Port Talbot; Wales
- Platforms: 2

Other information
- Status: Disused

History
- Opened: 14 March 1895
- Closed: 3 December 1962
- Original company: Rhondda and Swansea Bay Railway
- Pre-grouping: Rhondda and Swansea Bay Railway
- Post-grouping: Great Western Railway
Location

Aberavon (Seaside) railway station was a railway station on the Rhondda and Swansea Bay line which ran from the Rhondda Valley to Swansea on the Welsh coast in the county of Glamorgan.

== History ==
The station was incorporated into the Great Western Railway during the Grouping of 1923, Passing on to the Western Region of British Railways on nationalisation in 1948, it was then closed by the British Transport Commission.

Preceding station	Disused railways	Following station
Aberavon Town	Great Western Railway; Rhondda and Swansea Bay Railway	Baglan Sands
