= Sinker (mining) =

Skilled worker who creates new mine shafts

A sinker in mining in the 19th century was a worker who specialized in creating new vertical mine shafts.

The job was highly skilled and the workers who did this work were often regarded as an elite workforce.
