= The Weekly Mail =

Defunct English-language newspaper from Wales

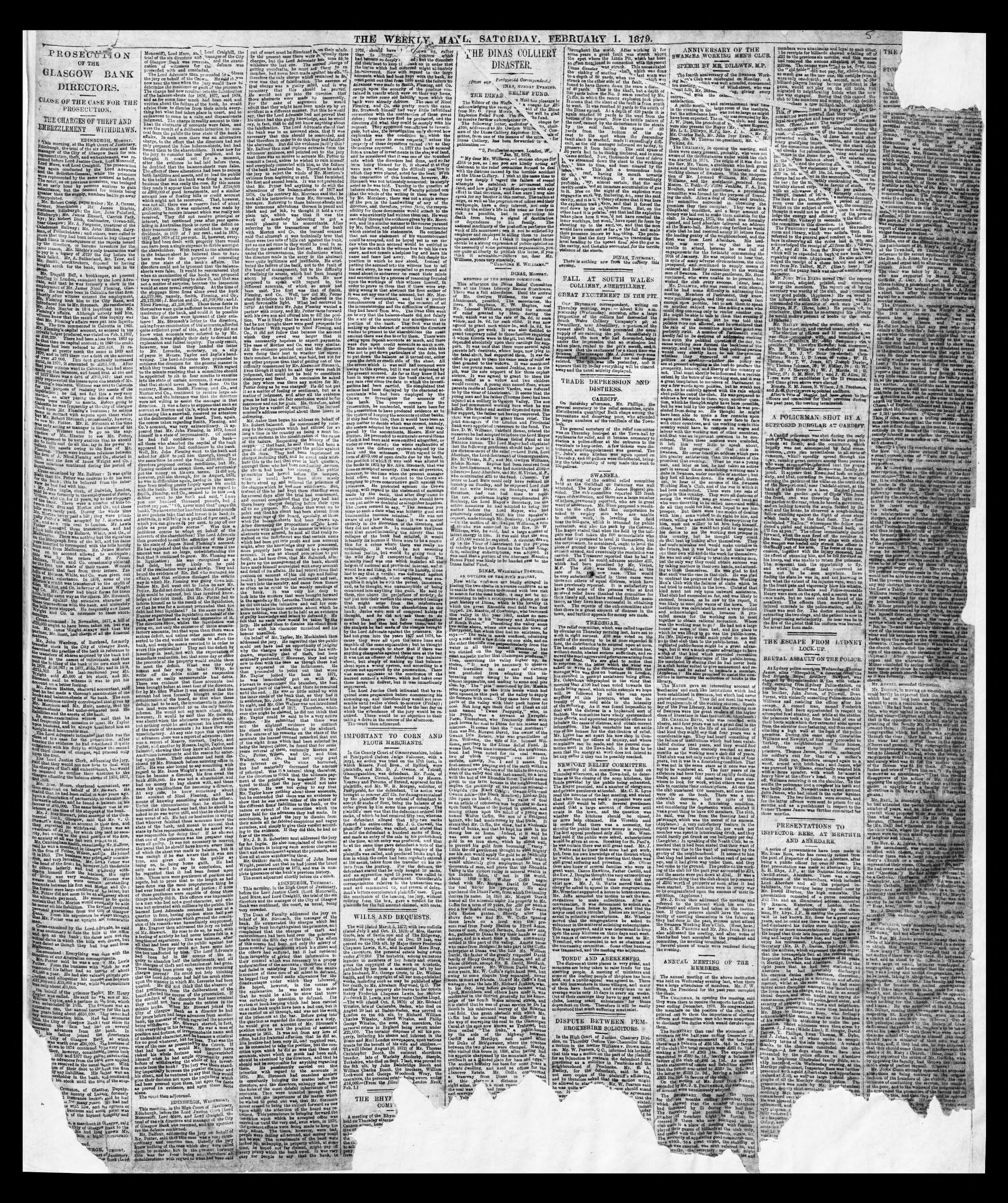
- Type: Weekly newspaper
- Publisher: Western Mail Ltd. (c. 1925); Henry Mackenzie Thomas (c. 1880–)
- Founded: 1870
- Language: English
- Headquarters: Wales

The Weekly Mail was an English-language weekly newspaper distributed in Wales, the Forest of Dean, and parts of Gloucestershire and Somerset. It contained general news and literary content, including short sketches of aspects of Welsh life.

Associated titles included Cardiff Weekly Mail and South Wales Advertiser (1878–1880) and Weekly Mail and Cardiff Times (1928–1955).
