= Abergwynfi =

Village in Neath Port Talbot, Wales

Coordinates: 51.65363°N 3.60304°W

Abergwynfi is a village in the Welsh county borough of Neath Port Talbot, in the community of Gwynfi and Croeserw.

Abergwynfi is the first half of a village of two parts, the other being Blaengwynfi. The names of the two villages mean "Mouth of the Gwynfi" and "Source of the Gwynfi" respectively, the Gwynfi being the (rather short) river that separates the two. The two villages were mainly built between 1892 and 1893, following the construction of the Swansea Bay Railway.

Aber and Blaengwynfi are generally referred to as "The Cape" by residents of the two villages and the neighbouring few. This term comes from when the villages were marketed as "The Cape of Good Hope" during the years when coal mining was very important to the valleys. Abergwynfi is located within the Afan Forest Park, which is a popular mountain bike centre. It is northeast of the Afan Valley, and is surrounded by forested hills and farmland.
