= Blaencwm =

Coordinates: 51.677°N 3.564°W

Blaencwm: Welsh: Blaen-y-Cwm
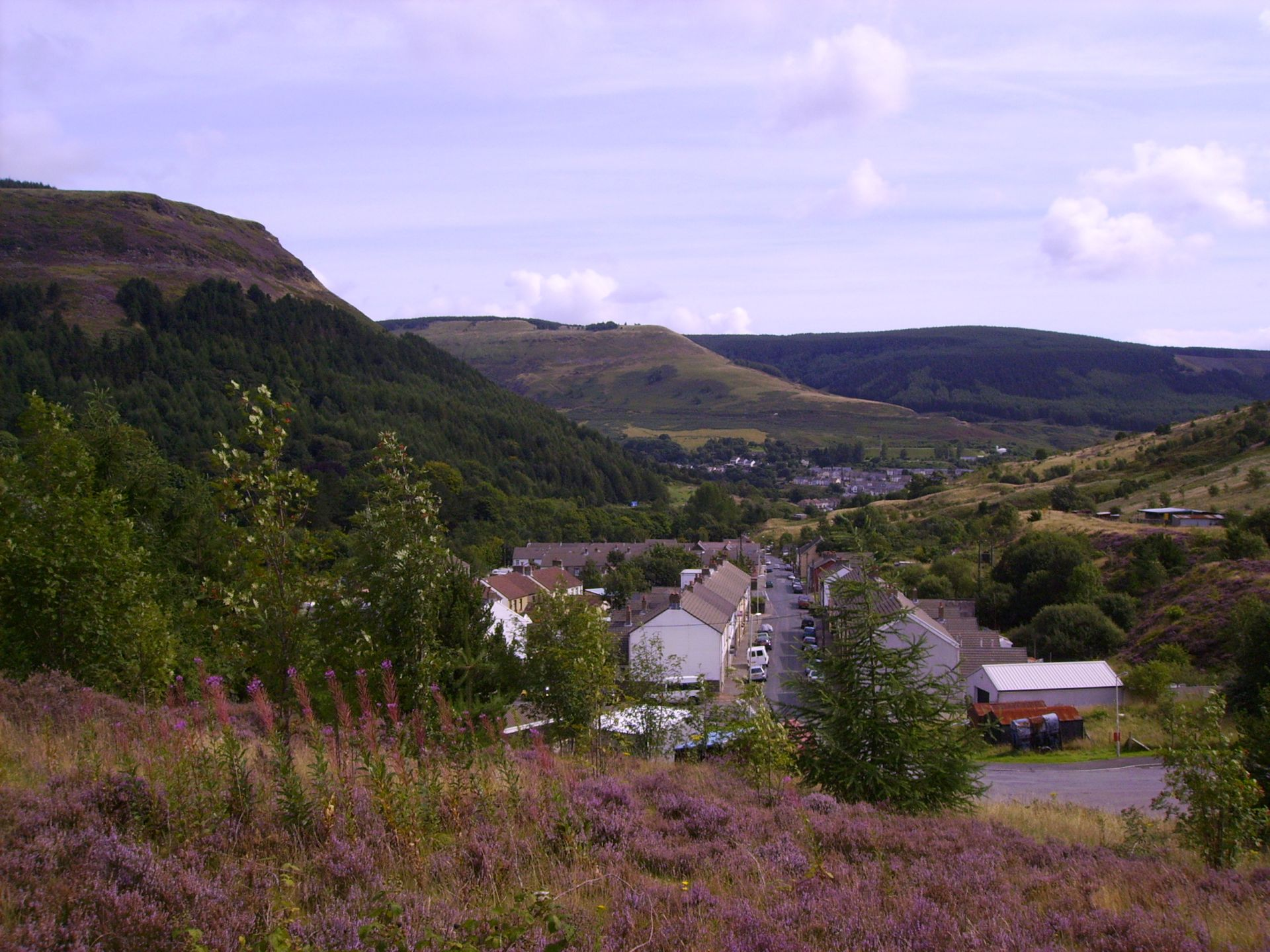

- Location within Rhondda Cynon Taf
- OS grid reference: SS922989
- Community: Treherbert
- Principal area: Rhondda Cynon Taf
- Preserved county: Mid Glamorgan
- Country: Wales
- Sovereign state: United Kingdom
- Post town: TREORCHY
- Postcode district: CF42
- Dialling code: 01443
- Police: South Wales
- Fire: South Wales
- Ambulance: Welsh
- UK Parliament: Rhondda and Ogmore
- Senedd Cymru – Welsh Parliament: Afan Ogwr Rhondda

Blaencwm (Welsh: Blaen-y-Cwm) is a village in the county borough of Rhondda Cynon Taf, Wales, lying at the head the Rhondda Fawr valley. Two collieries were opened here during the Industrial Revolution, the Dunraven Colliery in 1865 and the Glenrhondda Colliery in 1911. Both had closed by 1966 and the sites have since been landscaped, leaving little trace of their industrial past. It is in the historic county of Glamorgan.

== Location ==
Blaencwm is located in the upper Rhondda Valley about halfway between Treorchy and Hirwaun, and about one mile north of Treherbert. It is served by the A4061 road over Mynydd Ystradffernol.

== History ==
Before the industrialisation of the Rhondda, Blaencwm was a forested agricultural and rural area. There is evidence in the area of Mesolithic and Neolithic human activity, mainly through the discovery of basic hunting, foraging and tool making items. Blaencwm is also the site of three ruinous 16th century hafotai, small summer dwellings for transhumance agriculture, discovered on the north-east slope of the village. Of all the hafotai discovered in the Rhondda the most important is Lluest discovered in Blaencwm and proof of the agricultural history of the area.

In the 19th century with the coming of the Taff Vale Railway, coal mines began opening in the upper Rhondda Fawr. Two mines were sunk in Blaencwm, the first was the Dunraven Colliery opened by Thomas Joseph's Dunraven United Collieries in 1865. The business went in liquidation in 1866 and was taken over by Watts and Company in 1872. Between then and 1913 when it was purchased again, this time by the Cory Brothers, it changed its name to Tydraw Colliery. It closed in 1956. The second colliery, Glenrhondda (known locally as the Hook and Eye due to its reputation for improvisation), was opened in 1911 by Glenavon Garw Collieries. The mine was served by the Rhondda and Swansea Bay Railway using the Rhondda Tunnel, which linked Blaencwm to Blaengwynfi in the Afan Valley. This pit was closed by the National Coal Board in 1966. The sites of both mines have since been cleared and landscaped to resemble the surrounding area.
