= Blaengwynfi =

Coordinates: 51.65631°N 3.60458°W

Blaengwynfi is a village in the Afan Valley, in the Neath Port Talbot area of South Wales. It is in the community of Gwynfi and Croeserw,

== Location ==
It is a part of the Upper Afan Valley. It used to be a coal mining village, and is directly below Abergwynfi. The source of the River Afan is at the top of the nearby mountain.

== Transport ==
Blaengwynfi is on the A4107 road that links the Afan valley to the Rhondda valley.

Blaengwynfi railway station was on the Rhondda and Swansea Bay Railway, which operated from 1890 to 1968.

The Rhondda Tunnel carried the railway to Blaencwm in the Rhondda Valley. There are proposals to reopen the tunnel to pedestrians and cyclists.

== Sport ==
Blaengwynfi is home to a local football team, Gwynfi United.

== Notable residents ==
- The Presbyterian minister, author and noted historian Tom Beynon (1886–1961) was Pastor of the Balengwynfi Tabernacle in 1916–1933.
- Harry Hanford (1907–1995), born in Blaengwynfi, played as a footballer over 300 times in the Football League, for Swansea Town, Sheffield Wednesday and Exeter City. He was capped seven times for Wales.
