= South Wales Mineral Railway =

The South Wales Mineral Railway (SWMR) was a railway built to serve collieries in the upper Afan Valley, and bring their output to a dock at Briton Ferry, in South Wales. It opened in stages, in 1861 and 1863. It was built on the broad gauge and had steep gradients, including a rope worked incline near Briton Ferry.

Always short of money, it was worked by a coal company for some years and then by the Great Western Railway from 1908. It was absorbed by that company in 1923.

A tunnel collapse in 1947 closed the western section of the network, but by then it was connected to an alternative route via Port Talbot. A local passenger service was operated between 1918 and 1930, continuing for the use of miners until 1964. The line closed completely in 1970.

== Beginnings ==
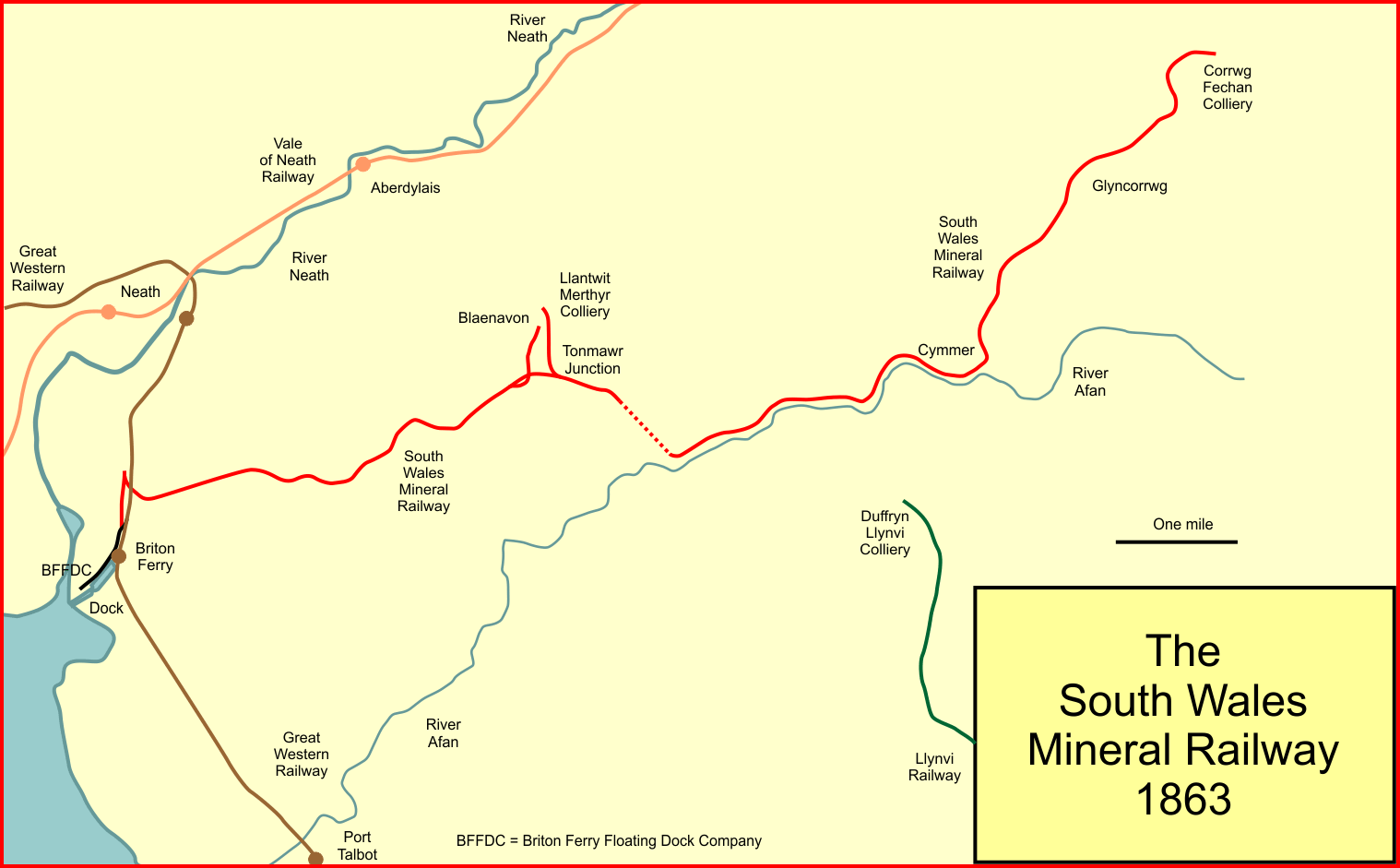
System map of the South Wales Mineral Railway

Towards the end of the 18th century, collieries began to be developed in the Cymmer district were opened. Coal was carried to wharves on the Bristol Channel on the backs of pack animals, although a stone-block sleeper tramroad, the Glyncorrwg Mineral Railway, took coal from the Blaen Cregan colliery to the Neath Canal at Aberdulais.

The Glyncorrwg Mineral Railway was abandoned in 1852 and the track was lifted. By this time the South Wales Railway had opened its line, in 1850; it was a broad gauge trunk railway connecting the area between Swansea, Neath and Port Talbot with the merging railway network of the associated Great Western Railway. (The companies amalgamated in 1863.)

In the upper areas of the Afan Valley pits were being developed, and needed a means of transport to the forges further down the Afan Valley, and at Neath, as well as to docks on the Bristol Channel.

The first successful proposal for a railway to connect with the mineral resources of the Afan Valley was the Briton Ferry Dock and Railway. It was necessary to bring the mineral output to waterborne transport, and a wharf at Briton Ferry was to be developed for the purpose. The Briton Ferry Dock obtained its authorising act of Parliament, the Briton Ferry Dock and Railway Act 1851 (14 & 15 Vict. c. xlix), on 3 July 1851.

== SWMR authorised ==
South Wales Mineral Railway Act 1853
- Act of Parliament
- Parliament of the United Kingdom
- Long title: An Act for making a Railway from the South Wales Railway at Britonferry to Glyncorrwg in Glamorganshire, to be called "The South Wales Mineral Railway."
- Citation: 16 & 17 Vict. c. cxcvii

Dates
- Royal assent: 15 August 1853

Text of statute as originally enacted

In fact the scheme was not progressed, and in the 1853 session of Parliament, a successor scheme, the South Wales Mineral Railway (SWMR) was authorised by an act of Parliament, the South Wales Mineral Railway Act 1853 (16 & 17 Vict. c. cxcvii), on 15 August 1853. (Note: According to Awdry, and Barrie and Baughan, Simmonds and Morgan. Smith says 10 August 1853.) Viscount Villiers was a majority owner of the existing dock at Briton Ferry and he was a leading promoter of the SWMR. It was to be on the broad gauge, linking with the newly opened South Wales Railway, and the engineer was Isambard Kingdom Brunel. Capital authorised was £120,000.

South Wales Mineral Railway (Lease) Act 1855
- Act of Parliament
- Parliament of the United Kingdom
- Long title: An Act to enable the South Wales Mineral Railway Company to grant a Lease of their Undertaking.
- Citation: 18 & 19 Vict. c. xxiii

Dates
- Royal assent: 25 May 1855

Text of statute as originally enacted

The new company had difficulty in raising subscriptions for shares, and this significantly delayed the start of construction. At a general meeting on 16 September 1854 it was announced that the company had failed to induce owners of property along the line to take the remaining shares. A proposal had been received from the Glyncorrwg Coal Company to take up the unallotted capital, provided it was granted a lease at a rental which would ensure a dividend of 5 per cent. This was approved, and the South Wales Mineral Railway (Lease) Act 1855 (18 & 19 Vict. c. xxiii) of 25 May 1855 ratified a lease for up to 99 years to ten gentlemen trading under the name of the Glyncorrwg Coal Company. The lease was finalised on 4 January 1856.

== Construction and first opening ==
After several changes of prospective contractor, work on construction was begun in October 1857. A series of reports of imminent opening were given to the shareholders, until finally it opened prior to a shareholders' meeting in September 1861.

The line turned north-west across the South Wales Railway main line, crossing over it by a bridge. There was a backshunt to reach the actual dock operated by the Briton Ferry Floating Dock Company. There was a 1 1/2 mile double-track inclined plane, known as Ynys y Maerdy, to descend to that area from the hills; the remainder of the line was single track.

South Wales Mineral Railway Act 1861
- Act of Parliament
- Parliament of the United Kingdom
- Long title: An Act to enable the South Wales Mineral Railway Company to extend their Railway to the Briton Ferry Docks; and for other Purposes.
- Citation: 24 & 25 Vict. c. ccx

Dates
- Royal assent: 1 August 1861

Construction was completed in stages from the Briton Ferry end. It reached Argoed, short of the tunnel on 1 September 1861. Coincidentally Briton Ferry Dock opened on 22 August 1861, and this prompted the directors of the SWMR to seek an act of Parliament to connect its railway to the new dock from a point near the original line's junction with the SWR. Some requested provisions were refused but the South Wales Mineral Railway Act 1861 (24 & 25 Vict. c. ccx) received royal assent on 1 August 1861. The original line was open throughout on 10 March 1863. It was 12 1/4 miles long. The line had a tunnel 1,109 yards in length at Gyfylchi, near Tonmawr. Gradients were as steep as 1 in 22 quite apart from the incline. Access to Briton Ferry Dock was available from June 1863.

South Wales Mineral Railway Act 1864
- Act of Parliament
- Parliament of the United Kingdom
- Long title: An Act to enable the South Wales Mineral Railway Company to extend their Undertaking.
- Citation: 27 & 28 Vict. c. ccxcvii

Dates
- Royal assent: 29 July 1864

Text of statute as originally enacted

On 29 July 1864 the SWMR obtained the South Wales Mineral Railway Act 1864 (27 & 28 Vict. c. ccxcvii), which gave authorisation for some extensions at the upper end of the line.

== Financial problems and gauge conversion ==
In 1869 the Glyncorrwg Coal Company was wound up for non-payment of rents. As it was the lessor of the SWMR this posed a significant threat, but the Glyncorrwg Colliery Co. Ltd. was quickly formed to take over the activities of the defunct company. It was induced also to take over the working of the SWMR and an agreement to do so was signed on 23 March 1870.

In February 1871 the Great Western Railway (GWR) decided to convert its South Wales Railway lines to narrow (standard) gauge. In the Great Western Railway Act 1872 (35 & 36 Vict. c. cxxix) the GWR included powers to make arrangements with six South Wales railway companies affected by the change of gauge. The bill contained a clause authorising the GWR to make arrangements with the affected smaller companies, although without actually referring to compensation. The SWMR petitioned against the bill, but the result was that when the bill was passed, there was no mention of the SWMR.

The SWMR had to bear the cost itself, as did the Glyncorrwg Colliery Co. (for its own lines). The line was closed from 1 May to 4 June 1872 for the gauge conversion. The directors at first decided to sell the four broad gauge engines leased to the Glyncorrwg Colliery Co., but in the event one was retained and converted to narrow gauge. The Glyncorrwg Colliery Co. spent £14,599 on the new locomotives and converting the SWMR; SWMR capital expenditure on gauge conversion amounted to £4,585.

South Wales Mineral Railway Act 1874
- Act of Parliament
- Parliament of the United Kingdom
- Long title: An Act to authorise certain Arrangements concerning the capital of the South Wales Mineral Railway Company; and for other purposes.
- Citation: 37 & 38 Vict. c. cxv

Dates
- Royal assent: 16 July 1874

By November 1873 considerable financial liabilities had accrued, amounting to £35,000. The South Wales Mineral Railway Act 1874 (37 & 38 Vict. c. cxv) was given royal assent on 16 July 1874 authorising £22,210 of new preference shares for the conversion of the arrears of dividends and to issue £35,000 of debentures.

The September 1876 general meeting was informed that three collieries on the line had closed due to the state of the coal trade in South Wales, and by the following March only two collieries were working, Glyncorrwg and Corrwg Fechan. The Glyncorrwg Colliery Co. was not now in a financial position to continue the working agreement it went into liquidation. Robert Smith, manager of the Glyncorrwg Colliery Co., was appointed liquidator and continued to work the colliery and the railway. It was reported at the general meeting held in September 1877 that the quantity of coal carried was so small it would not cover the working expenses. On 23 August 1877, Mr T. J. Woods, the secretary, informed the directors that he had been appointed receiver of the SWMR.

A new Glyncorrwg Colliery Co. Ltd. was registered on 13 March 1880 with the same objects as the 1869 company, but this time with a capital of £78,000.

== Port Talbot Railway ==
In 1898, on 14 November, the Port Talbot Railway and Docks Company (PTR&D) opened its line from Tonmawr, connecting with the SWMR, to a dock at Port Talbot. By this time the 30-year lease by the Glyncorrwg Coal Company had expired and the PTR&D took over the working of the line, and adopted the Blaenavon and Whitworth branches.

== Control by the GWR ==
South Wales Mineral Railway Act 1903
- Act of Parliament
- Parliament of the United Kingdom
- Long title: An Act to regulate the capital of the South Wales Mineral Railway Company and for other purposes.
- Citation: 3 Edw. 7. c. xxiv

Dates
- Royal assent: 30 June 1903

Text of statute as originally enacted

South Wales Mineral Railway Act 1907
- Act of Parliament
- Parliament of the United Kingdom
- Long title: An Act to empower the South Wales Mineral Railway Company to construct a deviation railway to abandon part of their existing railway to raise further money and for other purposes.
- Citation: 7 Edw. 7. c. cvii

Dates
- Royal assent: 2 August 1907

The SWMR was being worked by the Glyncorrwg Colliery Co. and effectively funded by it as working costs increased and income remained at best static.

This could not go on indefinitely, as the Glyncorrwg company itself was not greatly profitable. On 8 October 1908 the SWMR, the PTR&D and the Glyncorrwg company agreed a working arrangement, which included the Great Western Railway which was now working the PTR&D. The GWR would fund the liquidation of the SWMR historic debt and from 1 January 1908 was considered to have had running powers. (Note: These dates and the manner of the change are described slightly differently in Morgan.)

As the network of the SWMR and the PTR&D was now under unified control, the GWR increasingly used the PTR&D route to bring mineral traffic down from Tonmawr. This avoided the use of the incline at Briton Ferry, which limited loads of trains. The cable worked incline was closed on 1 June 1910. Instead coal was then transported from Glyncorrwg to Port Talbot via the Gyfylchi Tunnel to Tonmawr.

== Passengers ==
Passengers had been carried on the line from about 1865, but almost certainly not in passenger carriages and not with Board of Trade sanction. Simmonds says that it was "condoned" in the 1880 working agreement, and that in the week ending 31 December 1886, 1,053 passengers had been conveyed between Cymmer and Ynysmaerdy Incline Top, from where it was a two-mile walk to Neath.

The mines at Glyncorrwg were difficult to man because there was inadequate housing there, and most of the colliers lived in Cymmer. There had been several requests to run a miners' service but sanction had repeatedly been refused by the Board of Trade.

In December 1916 the Blaencorrwg Colliery company asked the Board of Trade to authorise such a service, and now that the war effort demanded the production of coal, a different view was taken in January 1917. The service started on 5 March 1917, running from Cymmer to Glyncorrwg, Blaencorrwg and North Rhonda Halt. The trains were propelled up the rising gradient, and they were operated by the Port Talbot company. Glyncorwg South Pit reopened in 1919 and in November 1920 South Pit Halt was added to the station list.

There were four services in each direction, five on Saturdays. The passenger service was discontinued on 22 September 1930. After the closure to public services, workmen's trains continued until 1958, after which the colliers' service only ran between Glyncorrwg and North Rhondda Halt. In 1963 the service was further shortened back to South Pit Halt, and finally closed completely after 30 October 1964.

== Grouping and after ==
On 1 January 1923, the South Wales Mineral Railway company was subject to the process called the "grouping". The Railways Act 1921 had mandated that four new large railway companies, the "groups" would be created, and nearly all the existing railways of Great Britain would be merged into one or other of them. There was to be a new Great Western Railway; the old one was naturally the largest constituent.

The South Wales Mineral Railway had been worked by the Great Western Railway since 1908, so that the company itself was merely a financial entity. Its issued capital was stated to be £250,000, and its income for the year 1921 was £2,744, no doubt simply a lease charge. Its route length was declared to be 13 miles, and five locomotives were handed over to the new Great Western Railway. The terms were £10 cash for £100 SWMR ordinary stock, and £25 cash for £100 SWMR preference stock.

On 13 July 1947, there was a partial collapse of the Gyfylchi tunnel, and the section of line from there to Abercregan sidings near Cymmer district was closed. All goods and mineral traffic from Glyncorrwg was then taken to Port Talbot over the former Rhondda and Swansea Bay Railway line, reached by a double reversal at Cymmer. The stub branch was subsequently known as the North Rhondda branch.

Mineral traffic continued on the section between Abercregan Sidings and Cymmer Junction until August 1970, when the entire former SWMR network ceased to operate.

== Locomotives ==
=== Broad gauge ===
The Glyncorrwg Coal Company provided four or five different locomotives to work the South Wales Mineral Railway. One or two were withdrawn after a couple of years and little is known about them.

Princess was a small 0-4-0ST tank engine built by Manning Wardle and Company in 1863 (works no. 74). It was converted to standard gauge as an 0-6-0ST.

Glyncorrwg and another, which name is unknown, were a pair of Manning, Wardle 0-4-2ST locomotives. Glyncorrwg was built in 1864 (works no. 116). In 1872 it was sold to Roland Brotherhood, an engineer at Chippenham, who then sold it on to the Bristol and Exeter Railway. It lost its name and became No. 110, changing to 2058 when it became the property of the Great Western Railway in 1876. It was finally withdrawn in 1881. The second 0-4-2ST was built in 1866 (works no. 136) but in 1869 went to work on the Newquay and Cornwall Junction Railway where it was named Newquay. In 1874 the line passed to the Cornwall Minerals Railway, being withdrawn by them in 1877.

=== Standard gauge ===
In 1902 there were five standard gauge locomotives, all 0-6-0 saddle tanks. Nos. 1 to 4 were built at the GWR's Wolverhampton railway works in 1872/1873 and these may have been standard GWR 645 Class locomotives. No. 5 was built by Black, Hawthorn & Co in 1891 (works no. 1028).

== Topography ==
=== Location list ===
- Briton Ferry;
- Ynysymaerdy Incline;
- Tonmawr Junction;
- Gyfylchi Tunnel;
- Cymmer; opened 28 March 1918; Cymmer Corrwg from 1926; closed 22 September 1930; miners' use before and after public opening, about 1880 to 2 November 1964;
- Nantewlaeth Colliery Halt; unadvertised miners' halt; open 28 August 1940; closed 18 September 1955;
- Glyncorrwg; by 1865; open to public 28 March 1918; closed 22 September 1930; miners use before and after public opening, about 1880 to 2 November 1964;
- South Pit Halt; not advertised miners' halt; open 27 August 1923; closed 2 November 1964; at first Glyncorrwg South Pits, later South Pits;
- North Rhondda Halt; miners; sometimes known as Blaencorrwg Halt; opened 27 August 1923; closed March 1963;
- Glyncorrwg Colliery.
