= Rhondda and Swansea Bay Railway =

UK railway line

The Rhondda and Swansea Bay Railway was a Welsh railway company formed to connect the upper end of the Rhondda Fawr with Swansea, with the main objective of transporting coal and other minerals to Swansea docks. It was incorporated in 1882, but at first the connection to Swansea from Briton Ferry was refused.

The construction required the formation of the Rhondda Tunnel, nearly two miles (3.2 km) long through difficult geological conditions, but the line opened from Treherbert through the tunnel to Port Talbot and Aberavon in 1890. Authorisation to extend to Swansea, and also Neath, was secured and those lines opened in 1894 (goods) and 1895.

The line suffered operational challenges and was never greatly profitable, but it arranged for the Great Western Railway to operate the line and guarantee good dividends from 1906. The GWR incorporated the line's infrastructure in widening its own lines at Court Sart and at Swansea docks. As it was heavily dependent on coal mining activity, the line declined sharply after 1945, and it was progressively truncated. The Rhondda Tunnel suffered a collapse in 1968 and the upper part of the line closed. A short section of the original route is in use near Briton Ferry and in the Swansea docks complex.

== Before the railway ==
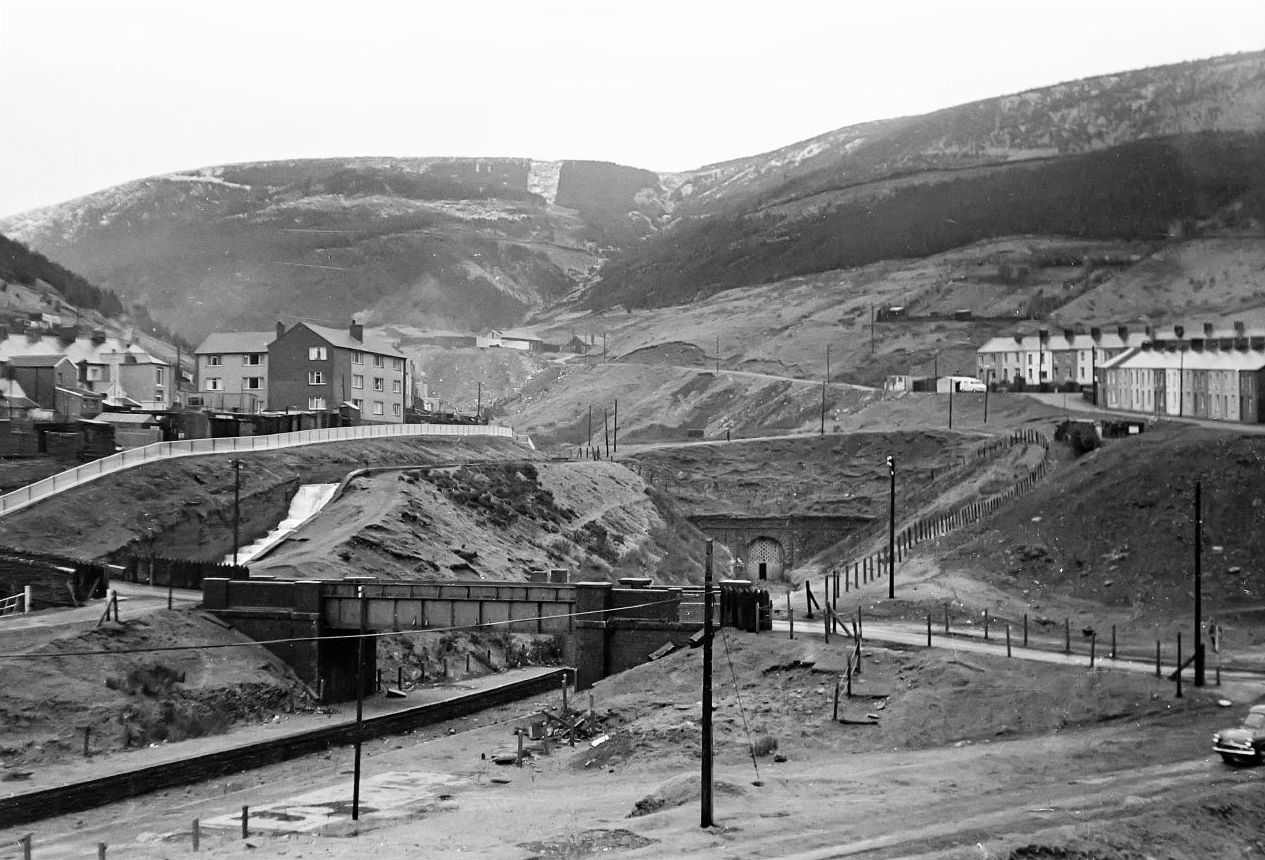
Blaengwynfi station and Rhondda Tunnel

Although coal and iron had been extracted for some centuries, the first industrialisation of mining in the Afan Valley was in 1811 when Samuel Lettston obtained a lease of land at Cwmavon and in 1819 established a blast furnace there in 1819. Part of the output was conveyed to Aberavon on the Mynydd Bychan tramroad, a horse-operated wooden waggonway that had been in existence since about 1750. In 1824 transport efficiency was improved by the opening of what became known as the Cwmavon Tramroad, three miles (4.8 km) in length and again horse-operated. The iron company expanded and became known as Vigurs and Co.

It was reported in 1830 that a new railway was under construction, from Oakwood (near Pontrhydyfen) to Aberavon, for the purpose of transporting coal from coalfields above Pontrhydyfen. This became known as the Oakwood Railway, but the colliery business was unsuccessful and the railway fell into disuse.

The South Wales Railway opened as far as Swansea on 2 June 1850. This was the first trunk railway in South Wales and provided a huge boost to trade there; from that time development of the dock facilities and of industry proceeded rapidly. The North Dock was opened in 1852, and the Swansea Harbour Trust was established in 1857, soon followed by the opening of the South Dock in 1859. Both docks were west of the River Tawe but the expansion of dock facilities resulted in much larger facilities east of the river.

The Prince of Wales Dock was opened by the Prince of Wales, later King Edward VII, in October 1881. It was capable of accommodating the largest vessels of the day, and the commercial interest of the dock was, among other things, to participate in the coal traffic that was at the time handled through Cardiff Docks. The Cardiff system had long suffered from extreme congestion of the railways serving the docks there, and of the berthing accommodation itself, with the result that there were constant complaints from shippers of the delay.

== Proposals ==
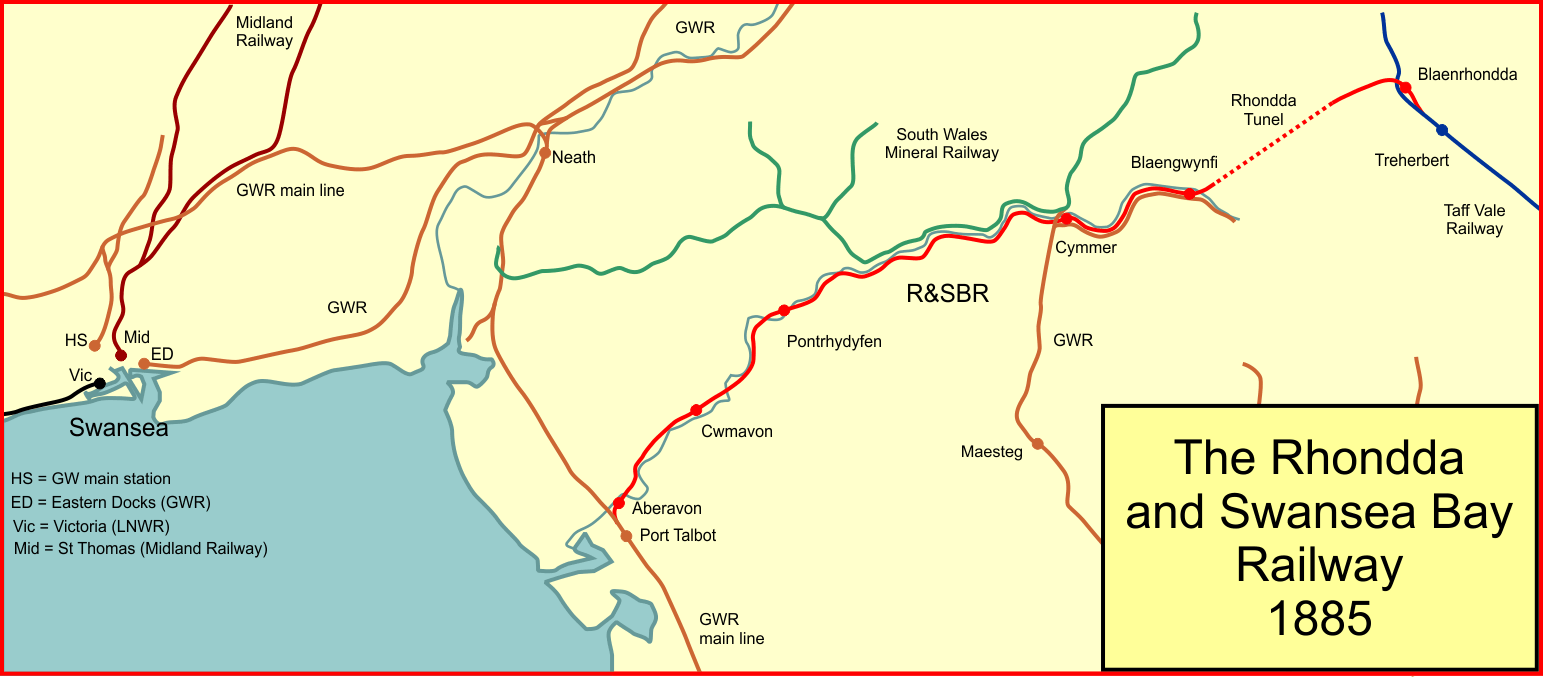
The Rhondda and Swansea Bay Railway in 1885

If a proportion of the Rhondda coal traffic could be brought to Swansea instead, that would be hugely to the advantage of the Swansea Dock interest, but it would be dependent on a direct railway from the Rhondda to Swansea. On 12 November 1880, as the Prince of Wales Dock was nearing completion, a public meeting was held in Swansea at which it was proposed to build a railway connecting the upper end of the Rhondda Fawr to Swansea, by making use of the South Wales Mineral Railway between Glyncorrwg and Neath. A tunnel would be needed at the upper end, and a rope-worked incline on the SWMR would have to be by-passed by means of a deviation. Nonetheless use of the Mineral Railway would still pose considerable operational difficulties.

A rival scheme, which was to become the Rhondda and Swansea Bay Railway, was promoted, running independently from Treherbert, through a long tunnel to the valley of the River Afan, and then following the valley down to Pontrhydyfen. From there it was to cross to Baglan Bay at Briton Ferry, then following the coast and crossing the River Neath near the sea by a tidal bridge. From Treherbert the line would descend almost all the way, giving an advantage to the loaded trains descending, although much of the colliery output in the Rhondda Valley would have to be hauled uphill to Treherbert to join the line there.

Rhondda and Swansea Bay Railway Act 1882
- Act of Parliament
- Parliament of the United Kingdom
- Long title: An Act for incorporating the Rhondda and Swansea Bay Railway Company and for other purposes.
- Citation: 45 & 46 Vict. c. cci

Dates
- Royal assent: 10 August 1882

Text of statute as originally enacted

The bills went to the parliamentary session of 1882 and the R&SBR scheme found preference, but there was stiff opposition from interests in Neath. They wished to develop their own wharf facilities, and a combination of resentment of the competition from Swansea and discomfort that the swing bridge crossing would impede their own river traffic, resulted in objection to their river being crossed near its mouth, (Note: Brunel had intended to bring the South Wales Railway across the river at this point, but he too had been refused.) and the promoters of the R&SBR shortened the scheme to end at Briton Ferry. Accordingly, the Rhondda and Swansea Bay Railway Act 1882 (45 & 46 Vict. c. cci) was passed on 10 August 1882; as well as the main line, it authorised branches from Pontrhydyfen to Aberavon and Port Talbot. The Cwmavon Tramway was to be acquired by the new company.

Rhondda and Swansea Bay Railway Act 1886
- Act of Parliament
- Parliament of the United Kingdom
- Long title: An Act to authorise the Rhondda and Swansea Bay Railway Company to construct new and substituted Railways to abandon the construction of portions of their authorised Railways and to amend the Acts relating to the Company and for other purposes.
- Citation: 49 & 50 Vict. c. xliv

Dates
- Royal assent: 4 June 1886

Text of statute as originally enacted

The access to Swansea was of course important both to the railway and to the dock complex there, and in 1883 a further Bill was promoted, to reach Swansea by tunnelling under the River Neath. Against technical opposition, this was passed. The tunnel would have cost £72,000 and in fact an agreement was reached with the Great Western Railway by which the GWR would carry the R&SBR traffic between Port Talbot and the R&SBR lines at Swansea. (The existing GWR main line largely paralleled the proposed R&SBR line.) This enabled the abandonment of the plans to reach Briton Ferry and to make the tunnel, and the company's capital was reduced accordingly, by the Rhondda and Swansea Bay Railway Act 1886 (49 & 50 Vict. c. xliv).

== Opening of the line ==
The engineer for the construction was S. W. Yockney. The first section of line, between Aberavon and Cymmer, was opened for traffic on 2 November 1885, giving improved access to the exceptionally rich coalfields in the Avon Valley. This section of the route followed the course of the old Cwmavon Tramway, realigned and regarded for locomotive operation. and made a junction with the GWR at Aberavon (Port Talbot GWR).

Land acquisition had been difficult; even now access for the tunnel construction had not been possible, as the Cardiff Times reported:

The difficulties in the way of obtaining possession of the land for the construction of the Rhondda tunnel having been to some extent removed, the directors hope they will shortly obtain possession so as to enable them to proceed with the work, which the engineers are confident can now be completed in two years.

Rhondda and Swansea Bay Railway Act 1888
- Act of Parliament
- Parliament of the United Kingdom
- Long title: An Act to extend the time limited for the compulsory purchase of lands for and the completion of certain Railways and to revive the powers for the construction of other Railways to confer further powers upon the Rhondda and Swansea Bay Railway Company and for other purposes.
- Citation: 51 & 52 Vict. c. cv

Dates
- Royal assent: 24 July 1888

Text of statute as originally enacted

Rhondda and Swansea Bay Railway Act 1890
- Act of Parliament
- Parliament of the United Kingdom
- Long title: An Act to authorise the Rhondda and Swansea Bay Railway Company to construct new Railways and other works and to confer further powers upon that Company and for other purposes.
- Citation: 53 & 54 Vict. c. cxlv

Dates
- Royal assent: 4 August 1890

Text of statute as originally enacted

Moreover, it was not until the passing of the Rhondda and Swansea Bay Railway Act 1888 (51 & 52 Vict. c. cv) that the essential junction with the Taff Vale Railway at Treherbert was authorised in Parliament. In 1890 some short extension lines were authorised by the Rhondda and Swansea Bay Railway Act 1890 (53 & 54 Vict. c. cxlv), at Swansea Docks, in Aberavon and Port Talbot, including the formation of a quay or wharf at Aberavon.

Further construction involved the long tunnel, and inevitably the progress was slow. The rock was extremely hard and the height of the surface above the tunnel prevented the sinking of shafts, so that tunnelling could only proceed from the two ends. 1,100 men were engaged on the work, and compressed air drills, then something of a novelty, and blasting, were employed. The tunnel was finally ready in 1890, the open air section from Cymmer to Blaengwynfi opening on 2 June 1890, followed by opening through the tunnel to Blaencwm on 2 July 1890; the short connection from there to the junction with the Taff Vale Railway followed on 14 July 1890. The Rhondda Tunnel was the longest wholly in Wales, at 3,443 yards (1.956 mi; 3.148 km). The Taff Vale station at Treherbert was used as the terminal station, and from there one-quarter mile (0.40 km) of Taff Vale track was used to reach Blaenrhondda Junction (later R&SB Junction), where the R&SBR itself started. A stiff climb followed to the mouth of the Rhondda Tunnel, and the climb continued in the tunnel, to the summit at the south-western end at Blaengwynfi. From there the line descended steeply.

The line was extended southwards from Aberavon to a dock in Port Talbot and a passenger station named Aberavon Dock was established there; this section opened in 1891. The GWR main line was crossed on the level by this extension.

== Extending to Swansea ==
Rhondda and Swansea Bay Railway Act 1892
- Act of Parliament
- Parliament of the United Kingdom
- Long title: An Act for enabling the Rhondda and Swansea Bay Railway Company to extend their Railways to Swansea and Neath and for other purposes.
- Citation: 55 & 56 Vict. c. clxxix

Dates
- Royal assent: 27 June 1892

Rhondda and Swansea Bay Railway Act 1893
- Act of Parliament
- Parliament of the United Kingdom
- Long title: An Act to confer Further Powers upon the Rhondda and Swansea Bay Railway Company and for other purposes.
- Citation: 56 & 57 Vict. c. lxiv

Dates
- Royal assent: 9 June 1893

Text of statute as originally enacted

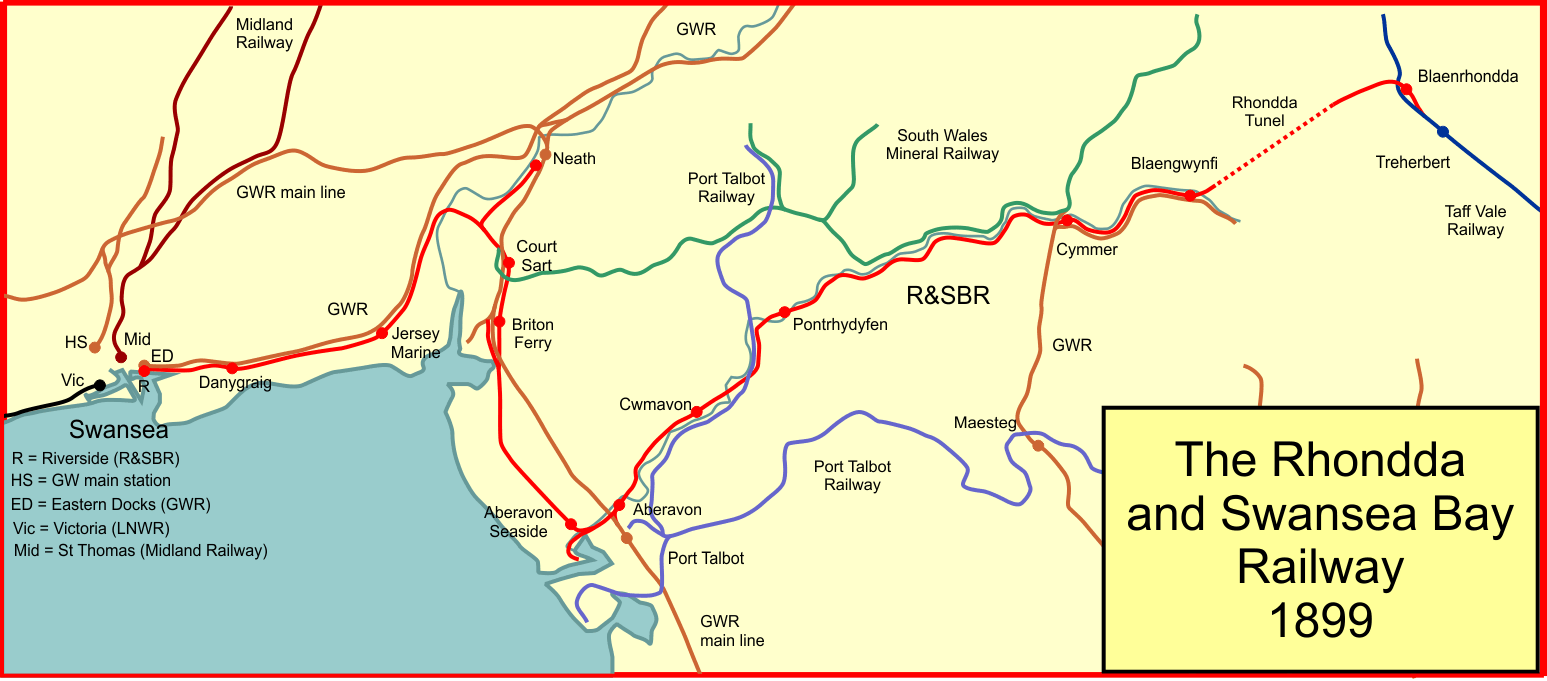
The Rhondda and Swansea Bay Railway in 1899

The relationship with the GWR for onward conveyance of mineral traffic from the R&SBR line proved disadvantageous to the R&SBR, and in 1891 it was decided to cancel the agreement with them regarding the conveyance of R&SBR traffic, and on 27 June 1892 powers were obtained in the Rhondda and Swansea Bay Railway Act 1892 (55 & 56 Vict. c. clxxix) to extend the R&SBR line from Briton Ferry to Swansea, including a swing bridge near Neath, which by now was accepted by the community there. Finally in June 1893 a further act of Parliament, the Rhondda and Swansea Bay Railway Act 1893 (56 & 57 Vict. c. lxiv) sanctioned the construction of the line between Aberavon and Briton Ferry in place of the 1891 authorisation.

A branch connection was made from Aberavon (Burrows Junction) to Briton Ferry Dock on 30 December 1893; the line swept to the west of the GWR main line. The line towards Swansea opened on 14 December 1894 to goods; it left the Briton Ferry Dock line (at Briton Ferry Junction) and crossed under the GWR main line, then running northwards, following close on its east side through Briton Ferry village. It was difficult to make a route through this section, as the GWR line, housing and industrial works were all close together; in fact the route picked its way at the back of houses, and the station was on an embankment between two rows of houses.

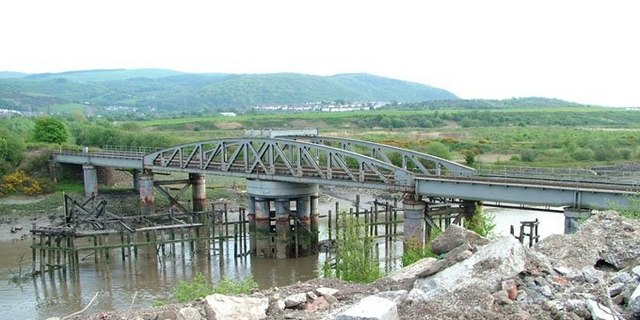
Neath Swing Bridge

At Court Sart the line turned west, again crossing under the GWR line and crossing the Neath Canal and both parts of the River Neath, then turning south and then west to Danygraig. Danygraig was within the Swansea Harbour complex, giving access to mineral trains to the Swansea Harbour Trust lines there. The main part of the Neath River was crossed by the large Neath swing bridge. The bridge is 388 feet (118 m) in length and the structure contains 1,400 tons of iron.

Passenger services through to Swansea started on 14 March 1895, with passenger trains now diverted away from the Aberavon Dock station and calling at a new Aberavon Seaside station. Swansea itself was reached for the time being over the Swansea Harbour Trust lines. Also on 14 March 1895 the R&SBR opened a passenger service to its own Neath station.

The R&SBR built its own line covering the final mile to its Riverside station at Swansea, opening on 7 May 1899 (Note: Morgan says 1895 but this is contradicted by MacDermot, Arthurton and Quick.) and eliminating the reliance for passenger trains on the Swansea Harbour Trust lines. On the same day several short branches totalling 1 mile 60 chains (2.8 km) were opened on the R&SBR system.

The passenger train service at this time was typically seven trains daily each way between Swansea and Treherbert; two trains ran on Sundays. The R&SBR and the Taff Vale Railway had a mutual arrangement to run trains through between Swansea and Cardiff via Treherbert; the two companies' rolling stock alternated on these trains, running throughout, but engines always changed at Treherbert.

== Operation by the Great Western Railway ==
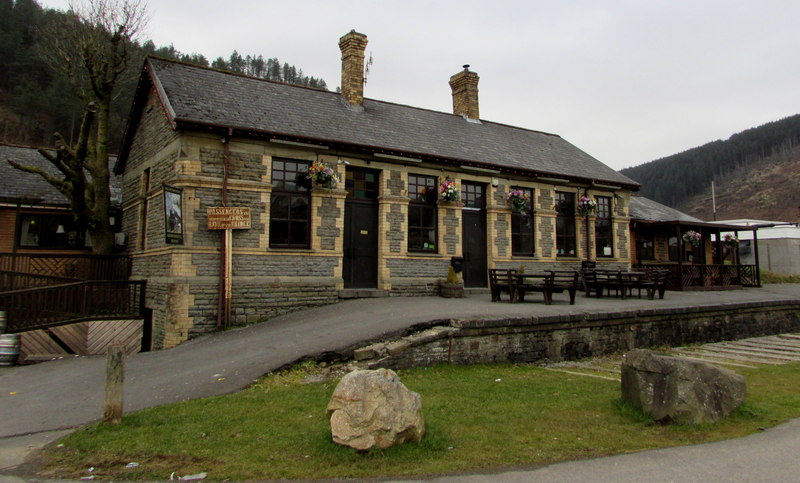
The old station at Cymmer, now "The Refreshment Rooms"

At the turn of the century new railways were proposed which were likely to enable the Barry Railway to encroach on the GWR area of dominance at Swansea. The R&SBR was a possible means of getting this access if another railway could get control, or running powers, and this motivated the GWR to negotiate with the R&SBR for control. In 1906 agreement was reached by which the GWR took over the management of the R&SBR system in return for generous financial guarantees. The colliery activity in the area was at its peak and the R&SBR directors were able to use this fact to the advantage of their shareholders in the negotiation. The ordinary dividend of the R&SBR had been 1.5% in 1902; the GWR now guaranteed 3% rising to 5% in 1907. This was in effect a lease; the arrangement took effect from 30 June 1906. (Note: MacDermot; Baughan says 1 January 1906; Morgan says 1 July 1906, and describes the arrangement as a lease.)

From this time the GWR drafted in three new 45xx 2-6-2T locomotives, 4504–4506, for use on the passenger trains. The Taff Vale Railway did not consider the GWR a friendly company, and the TVR reminded the GWR that the agreement to use Treherbert TVR station was with the R&SBR, not the GWR: the latter had to rebrand the locomotives and renumber them in the R&SBR stock, as 31–33, to comply.

In 1906 the new trunk route to Fishguard opened, with GWR hopes of making the harbour there an ocean terminal. Congestion delaying express trains through the Swansea area was an issue, and acquiring the R&SBR simplified the building of the Swansea District Line, a long new line avoiding Swansea altogether. The convergence (in the up direction) of the new route with the former South Wales Railway main line at Court Sart was by means of a dive-under, by following the course of the R&SBR line.

The R&SBR company remained in existence, as a financial company only; it was absorbed by the Great Western Railway in the Grouping of the railways of Great Britain in 1923, following the Railways Act 1921. (In fact the R&SBR, now only a financial shell, was absorbed on 1 January 1922, or 9 May 1922.)

== Major improvements ==
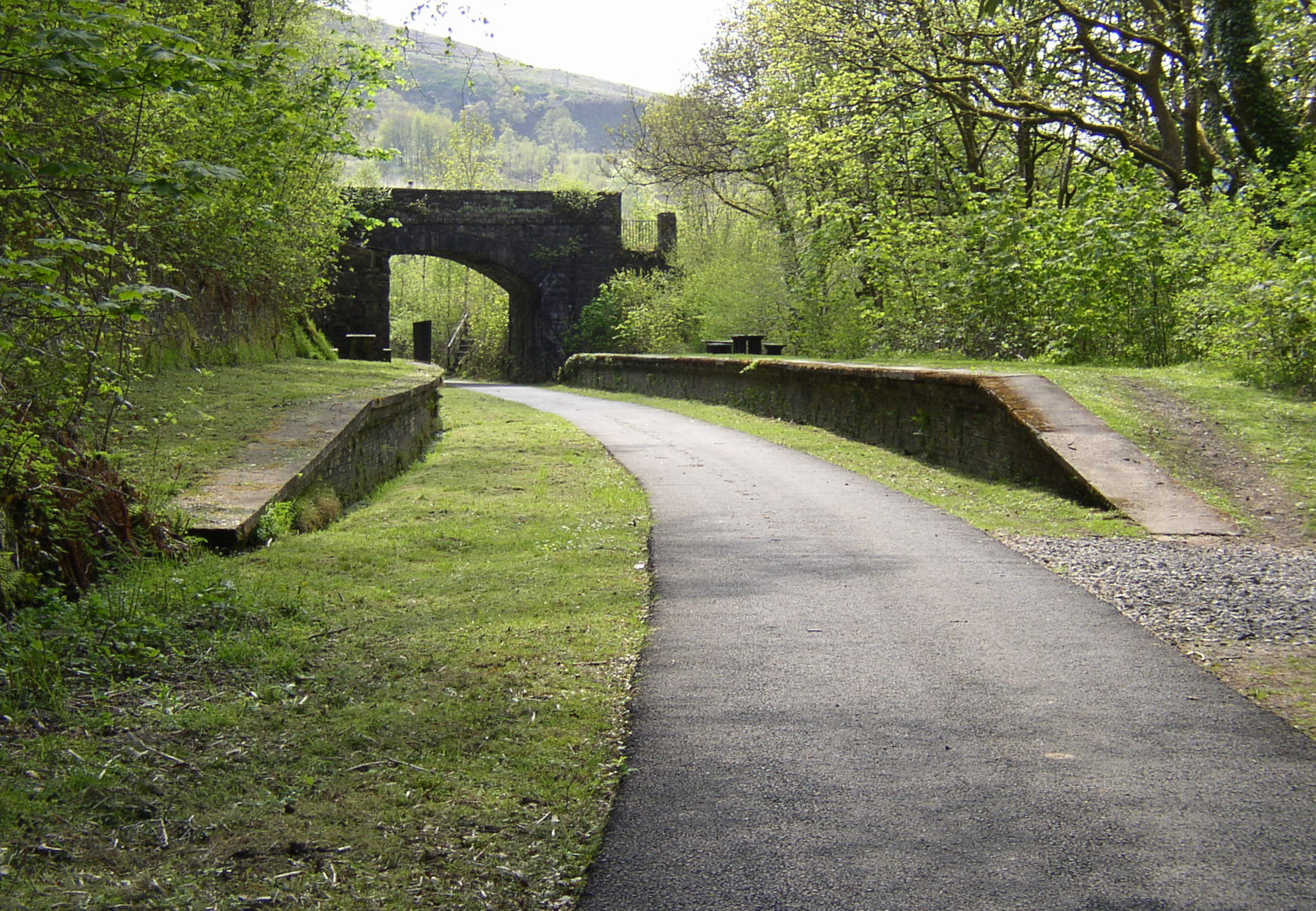
Cynonville railway station in 2013

In 1929 the government passed the Development (Loan Guarantees and Grants) Act 1929 with the intention of encouraging industrial investment that would reduce the high level of unemployment at the time. The Great Western Railway took up this scheme, and among other projects, improved the infrastructure in the Swansea and Port Talbot areas. The main line east from Swansea was exceptionally congested with mineral traffic, impeding the passage of the premium express passenger trains. The section between Court Sart and Port Talbot was widened, subsuming all of the former R&SBR infrastructure in the Court Sart and Briton Ferry area into the main line there.

Considerable investment was made in the GWR dock facilities at Swansea, especially in modern mechanical handling equipment and adaptation to the changing pattern of mineral exports. The numerous small-scale marshalling yards at the Burrows (the R&SBR section near Jersey Marine) were modernised, and the residual passenger service over this section was diverted to the GWR (former Swansea and Neath) line running parallel, so that the former R&SBR lines were dedicated to goods and mineral traffic. The diversion from Riverside freed up the approach of goods traffic at the docks, which had previously conflicted with passenger trains crossing.

The Swansea to Treherbert passenger service was diverted away, to use Swansea High Street station, running via Neath and the GWR main line; a shuttle service of GWR railcars ran from Briton Ferry to Swansea East Dock station instead of Riverside, which was closed to passengers. This change took place on 11 September 1933. (East Dock station closed to passengers on 28 September 1936.) On 16 September 1935 the R&SBR Neath branch closed to passenger traffic.

The R&SBR line from Aberavon crossed under the GWR main line approaching Briton Ferry, but the R&SBR had always had a spur to Briton Ferry Docks on the down side of the line. The scheme altered the two lines to form a burrowing junction for the R&SBR line joining the GWR.

== Under British Railways ==
In 1948 the railways of Great Britain were nationalised under the Transport Act 1947, becoming part of British Railways.

The former Port Talbot Railway had numerous branches in the lower part of the area of the R&SBR main line, and from near Pontrhydyfen to Port Talbot the two lines ran close together in the valley, although the PTR followed a much more tortuous alignment. In 1954 a connection was installed near Pontrhydyfen and the lower part of the PTR was closed.

In 1954 Briton Ferry Dock closed as a trade harbour.

The R&SBR line and the GWR former Llynvi and Ogmore Railway line ran parallel and adjacent from Cymmer to Blaengwynfi. When expensive repairs to Gelli Tunnel and Groeserw Viaduct on the R&SBR line became necessary in 1960, one and a half miles (2.4 km) of the R&SBR line was closed, and the GWR line was used. The L&OR line was connected into the R&SBR station, and east of the station a slue was made into the GWR line. A new junction was made some distance west of Blaengwynfi, where the two routes separated once again. The new arrangement was commissioned on 13 June 1960.

On 3 December 1962 the passenger service between Swansea and Cymmer was withdrawn; the R&SBR route east of Cymmer continued to be served by trains from Bridgend off the L&OR route via Maesteg.

The line remained in use from Duffryn Rhondda downwards for mineral traffic, but with the steep decline of colliery work locally, that section closed on 2 November 1964.

The R&SBR Neath branch had been a goods only line since 1935; on 6 September 1965 it closed completely except for a stub serving a private siding (until 30 November 1983).

The R&SBR part of the Bridgend - Cymmer - Treherbert journey was suspended temporarily on 26 February 1968 after distortion was recorded in the lining of Rhondda Tunnel which was closed as a precaution. The line had already been cited for closure under the Beeching Axe scheme, and the passenger service was maintained by road buses until 14 December 1970, when the line was considered permanently closed. For the time being Bridgend to Cymmer passenger trains used the R&SBR station as a terminus.

Port Talbot harbour declined over the years especially after World War II, but in 1970 it as revived as a modernised bulk handling harbour, and the former traditional dock closed on 1 January 1972.

The remaining parts of the Rhondda and Swansea Bay Railway still in use are the section from Court Sart Junction to Dynevor Junction that has become part of the Swansea District Line, and part of the Jersey Marine complex. The Neath Swing Bridge is on the District Line section; it was fixed about 1982, and is a grade II listed structure.

== Location list ==
=== First main line ===
- Treherbert; Taff Vale station;
- R&SB Junction; diverged from Taff Vale line;
- Blaenrhondda; opened 2 July 1890; closed 26 February 1968;
- Rhondda Tunnel;
- Blaengwynfi; opened 10 May 1890; closed 26 February 1968;
- Gelli Junction; with Bridgend and Abergwynfi Line, from 1960;
- Gelli Tunnel;
- Cymmer; opened 2 November 1885; renamed Cwm Cymmer 1924; renamed Cymmer Afan 1926; amalgamated with Cymmer General (former L&OR), as Cymmer Afan, January 1950; closed to public 22 June 1970; school use until 14 July 1970; divergence of L&OR line to Maesteg;
- Duffryn Rhondda; miners' use by 1898; opened to public October 1912; closed 3 December 1962; miners service until 7 November 1966;
- Cynonville Halt; opened for miners as Cynon Colliery 1898.:opened to public as Cynonville Halt 1912: closed 2 January 1956;
- Pontrhydyfen; opened 25 June 1885; closed 3 December 1962;
- Oakwood Junction; divergence of Tonmawr line from 1954;
- Cwmavon; opened 25 June 1885; closed 3 December 1962; [4]
- Aberavon Town; opened 25 June 1885; renamed Aberavon Town 1924; closed 3 December 1962;
- Burrows Junction; Briton Ferry line diverged;
- Port Talbot Docks; opened October 1891; closed 14 March 1895; workmen's use until 1984;
- Wharf at Port Talbot Dock.

=== Swansea line ===
- Burrows Junction (above);
- Aberavon Seaside; opened April 1899; closed 3 December 1962;
- Baglan Sands Halt; opened 1 May 1933; closed 26 September 1938; reopened 29 May 1939; closed 25 September 1939;
- Baglan Junction; divergence of Briton Ferry Docks branch;
- Vernon Junction; spur to GWR line diverged;
- Briton Ferry; opened 14 March 1895; renamed Briton Ferry East 1924; closed 16 September 1935;
- Court Sart; opened 14 March 1895; closed 16 September 1935;
- Junction; convergence with spur from Court Sart Junction GWR;
- Neath Branch Junction; divergence of Neath line;
- Neath Loop Junction; divergence of Neath Loop (for Swansea District Line); later combined with Dynevor Junction;
- Dynevor Junction; divergence of spur to Cardonnel Junction on former Swansea and Neath line, to Swansea East Dock;
- Cape Platform; workmen's station; unknown opening date; closed 11 September 1933;
- Jersey Marine; opened 14 March 1895; closed 11 September 1933;
- Baldwins Halt; opened as workmen's station 14 March 1895; public station from December 1922; closed 11 September 1933;
- Danygraig; opened 14 March 1895; replaced by station on GWR line 11 September 1933;
- Swansea Riverside; R&SBR service to East Dock opened 14 March 1895; own terminus 7 May 1899; renamed Swansea Docks 1924; renamed Swansea Riverside 1926; closed 11 September 1933.

Note: the line from Dynevor Junction to Swansea Riverside was almost completely subsumed in marshalling sidings in later years.

=== Neath branch ===
- Neath Branch Junction; above;
- Neath; opened 14 March 1895; renamed Neath Canal Bridge 1924; renamed Neath Canalside 1926; closed 16 September 1935.

== The Rhondda Tunnel Society ==
The Rhondda Tunnel Society was formed in September 2014. The short-term goal of the society was to put on display the tunnel's original cover stone which stood above the entrance of the tunnel at Blaencwm. The society is campaigning to reopen the tunnel as a cycle and walking route.

== Remains ==
The section along the Afan Valley is now the route of the Afan Valley Cycleway,

The former Cymmer station is now a public house, known as "The Refreshment Rooms".

Two original Rhondda and Swansea Bay coaches have survived into the present day. Coaches No. 18 and No. 72 now stand in private residence as holiday homes.
