= Nant Ffrwdwyllt =

Stream

Coordinates: 51°35′07″N 3°46′29″W

Nant Ffrwdwyllt (sometimes known as Nant Cwm Farteg) is a stream that runs through Cwm Dyffryn, within the county borough of Neath Port Talbot, Wales, from the village of Bryn, through the village of Goytre and the district of Taibach in Port Talbot, to the sea. The stream was originally a tributary of the River Afan but was diverted in the 18th century into the ironworks at what was to become Port Talbot to provide a source of water. It now flows into Port Talbot Docks. Several streets are or have been named after it, notably the present-day Ffrwdwyllt Street in Taibach, where the stream runs close to St Theodore's Church and the Talbot Memorial Park.

The name of the stream is translated into English as "wild brook"; this is thought to be because of the way the stream suddenly grows after heavy rain. This effect is attributed to the fact that the stream is approximately 9 kilometres long and passes down steep hills which quickly channel the rain that comes from the Atlantic.

According to Cadw, a mill that once stood on the Ffrwdwyllt at Goytre was associated with the Grange of Hafod-y-porth, which belonged to the Cistercian monastery of Margam Abbey. Former coal levels in the valley have left industrial remains along the banks of the stream.
