= Holy Cross Church, Port Talbot =

Holy Cross Church
- Chapel of Ease
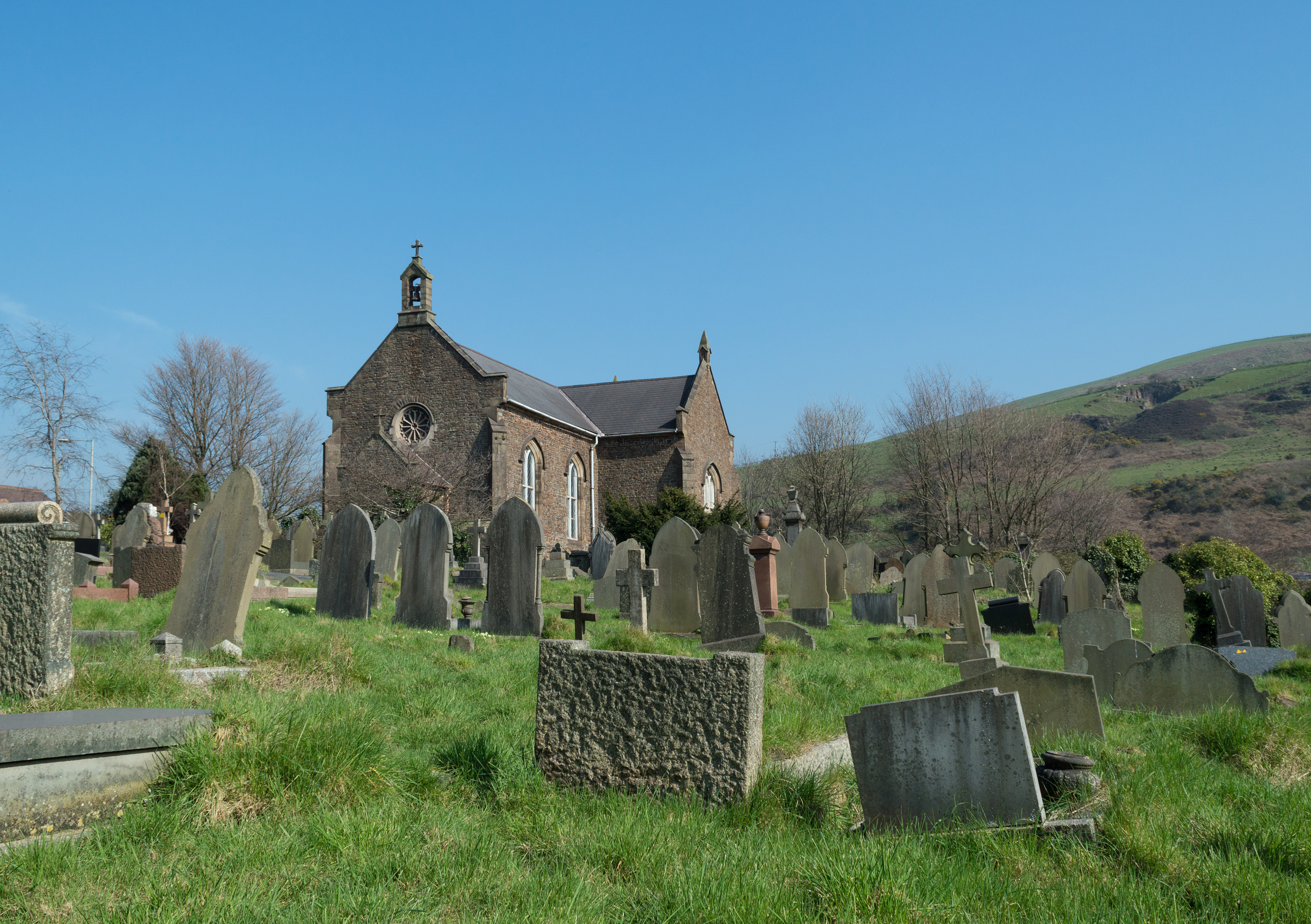
- Holy Cross Church
- 51°35′28″N 3°46′09″W
- Country: Wales
- Language: English
- Denomination: Church in Wales

Architecture
- Functional status: Redundant
- Heritage designation: Grade II listed
- Designated: 28 April 2000
- Architect: Edward Haycock Sr.
- Years built: 1827
- Closed: 2008

Specifications
- Capacity: 500

Administration
- Parish: Margam

Holy Cross Church, Port Talbot, also known locally as the "Chapel of Ease", is a Victorian church located centrally in the Taibach district of Port Talbot, Wales. Prior to the building of the M4 motorway flyover through the centre of the town in the 1960s, it was in the centre of a residential area, but it is now dominated by junction 40 of the motorway. The land was originally donated by C. R. M. Talbot, MP, the owner of the Margam Abbey estate, as a church for local people who could not get to the abbey itself to worship.

The church was built in 1827 by the Shrewsbury architect Edward Haycock Sr., with William Bruce Knight as its first vicar, and fell within the parish of Margam, as a chapel of ease to Margam Abbey. It had a capacity of 500.

After the building of St Theodore's Church, Port Talbot, Holy Cross became a subsidiary of the new parish of Taibach. In 1903 Holy Cross was upgraded, with G. E. Halliday as architect, to bring it up to the standard of a parish church, and a rood screen was added.

The parents of the actor Anthony Hopkins were married at the church in 1936.

== Closure ==
The church closed at the end of December 2008 after part of the ceiling collapsed. It was declared redundant by the Archbishop of Wales, Barry Morgan, in 2009.

The cemetery contains several war graves in the care of the Commonwealth War Graves Commission.

A proposal to turn the church into a private residence met with opposition from those with relatives buried in the churchyard. It was then proposed to convert the building into a chapel of rest instead. The chapel was taken over by a local funeral director in 2016.
