= Goytre =

Coordinates: 51.5923°N 3.7555°W

Goytre: Welsh: Goetre
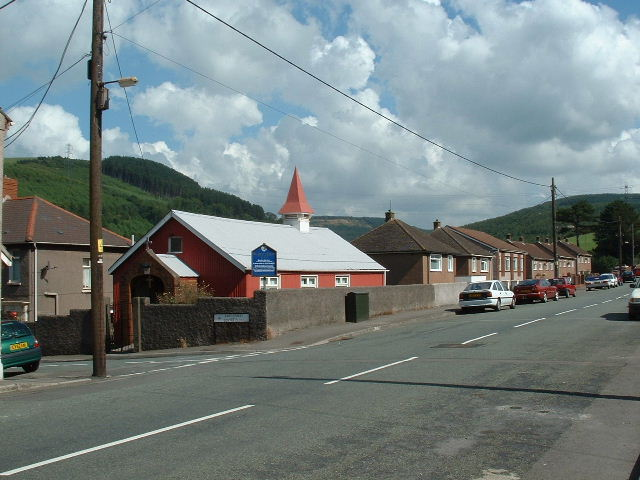
- St Peter's Church, before its closure
- Principal area: Neath Port Talbot
- Preserved county: West Glamorgan
- Country: Wales
- Sovereign state: United Kingdom
- Post town: PORT TALBOT
- Postcode district: SA13
- Dialling code: 01639
- Police: South Wales
- Fire: Mid and West Wales
- Ambulance: Welsh
- UK Parliament: Aberafan Maesteg
- Senedd Cymru – Welsh Parliament: Aberavon
- Councillors: Robert Jones (Welsh Labour); Dennis Keogh & Laura Williams (Welsh Labour)

Goytre (Welsh: Goetre) is a village near the town of Port Talbot, Wales.

The village lies in the valley of the Nant Ffrwdwyllt, between the communities of Taibach, Cwmafan, Bryn and Margam.

The former St Peter's Church (Church in Wales) was a 'tin tabernacle' opened in 1915. Situated on East Street and Goytre Road, the church closed in late 2017 and the building was offered for sale in 2019.

The local football team Goytre United F.C. is based at Glenhafod Park Stadium and play in the Cymru South league.
