= Margam and Tai-bach =

Electoral ward in Neath Port Talbot, Wales

Margam and Tai-bach is an electoral ward in Neath Port Talbot, Wales. It includes the communities of Margam, Margam Moors and Taibach. It elects three councillors to Neath Port Talbot County Borough Council.

The ward was created following the recommendations of a local government boundary review, with the merger of the former Margam and Tai-bach wards.

According to the 2011 UK Census, the population of the Margam ward was 5,927 and in the Tai-bach ward it was 4,799.

== 2022 local election ==
Tai-bach has previously been represented by two Labour Party councillors, but neither stood for election in 2022. Rob Jones, Labour councillor for Margam stood again at this election, as did Dennis Keogh, former councillor for the nearby Port Talbot ward. Jones was also the former leader of the council.

All three seats were won by the Labour candidates.

Neath Port Talbot CBC election, 5 May 2022
Party	Candidate	Votes	%	±%
Labour	Robert Jones	1,166	19	
Labour	Laura Williams	1,077	17	
Labour	Dennis Keogh	982	16	
Plaid Cymru	Colin Deere	873	14	
Plaid Cymru	Stephen Bevan	868	14	
Plaid Cymru	Wayne White	534	9	
Independent	John Bamsey	532	8	
Conservative	Anthony Hill O'Shea	236	4	
Turnout		2,401	39	
Labour win (new seat)				
Labour win (new seat)				
Labour win (new seat)				

== See also ==
- List of electoral wards in Wales
