= List of SSSIs in West Glamorgan =

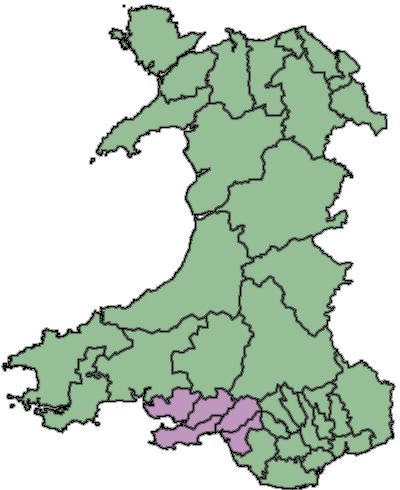
West Glamorgan AOS

Lists of Sites of Special Scientific Interest in West Glamorgan comprise:

- List of Sites of Special Scientific Interest in Carmarthenshire (around Llanelli)
- List of Sites of Special Scientific Interest in Neath Port Talbot
- List of Sites of Special Scientific Interest in Swansea
