= Evans-Bevan baronets =

Baronetcy in the Baronetage of the United Kingdom

The Evans-Bevan Baronetcy, of Cadoxton-juxta-Neath in the County of Glamorgan, is a title in the Baronetage of the United Kingdom. It was created on 9 July 1958 for the Welsh businessman David Evans-Bevan. As of 2024 the title is held by his grandson, the third Baronet, who succeeded his father in that year.

== Evans-Bevan baronets, of Cadoxton-juxta-Neath (1958) ==
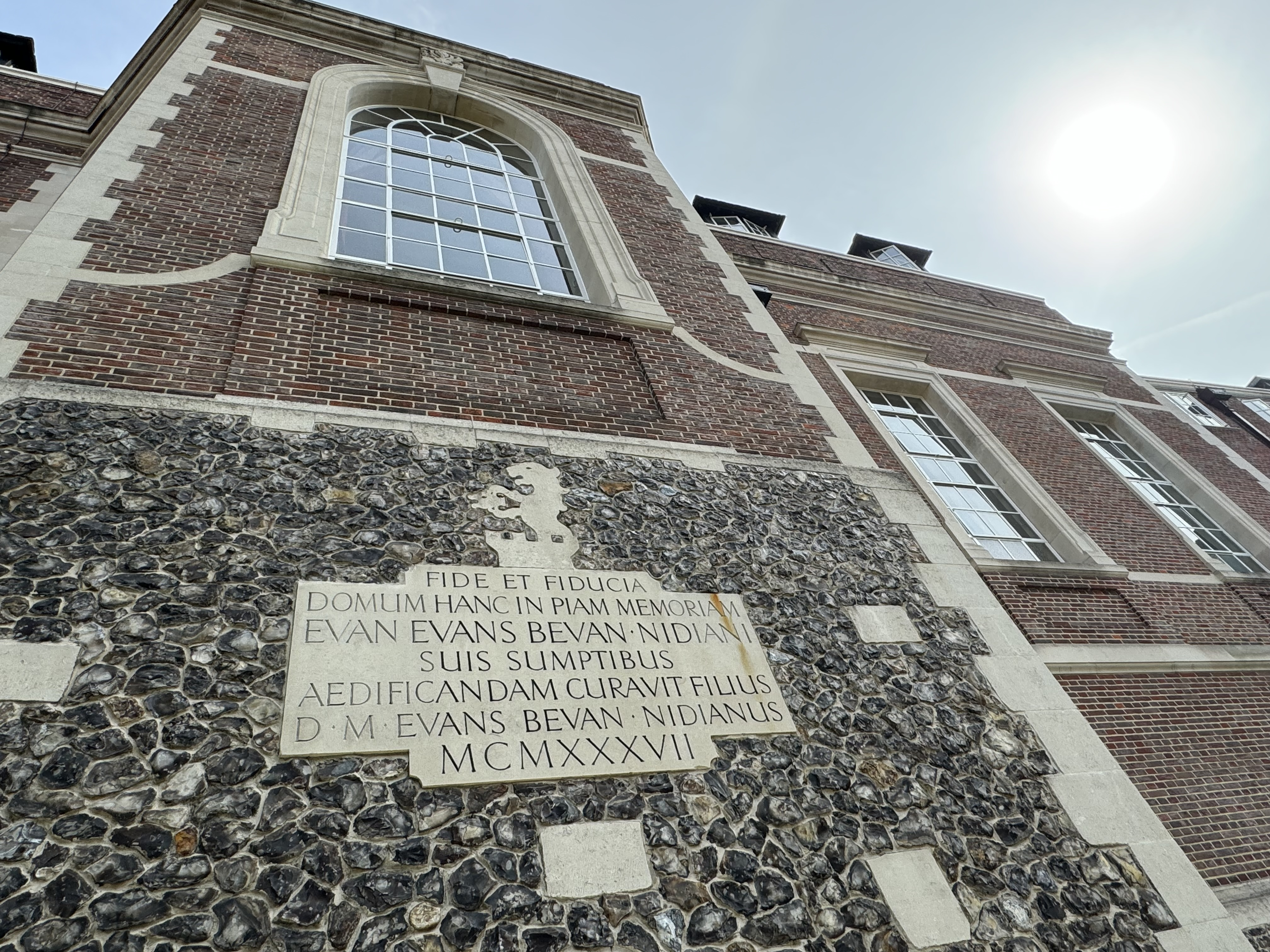
Latin Inscription: FIDE ET FIDUCIA DOMUM HANC IN PIAM MEMORIAM EVAN EVANS BEVAN • NIDIANI SUIS SUMPTIBUS AEDI FICANDAM CURAVIT FILIUS D•M EVANS BEVAN • NIDIANUS MCMXXXVII ("Faith and confidence. This house built in devoted memory of Evan Evans Bevan-Nidian. His son D. M. Evans Bevan-Nidian has taken care of (paid for) building (of) this building. — 1937")

- Sir David Martyn Evans-Bevan, 1st Baronet (1902–1973)
- Sir Martyn Evan Evans-Bevan, 2nd Baronet (1932–2024)
- Sir David Gawain Evans-Bevan, 3rd Baronet (born 1961)

The heir apparent is the present holder's son Patric David Evans-Bevan (born 1994).

== Goodenough College ==
In the courtyard of the London House of Goodenough College, a commemorative plaque mentions the building's history. Nidianus refers to Neath, the place in Wales from which the family came; close by was the Roman fort Nidum.

== See also ==
- Margam Castle
