= Llewellyn Heycock, Baron Heycock =

Welsh local politician and life peer

The Right Honourable The Lord Heycock CBE

Personal details
- Born: Llewellyn Heycock; 12 August 1905 Margam, Wales
- Died: 13 March 1990 (aged 84)
- Party: Labour
- Occupation: Politician

Coat of arms of Llewellyn Heycock, Baron Heycock

Crest
On a Cap of Maintenance Gules turned up Ermine a Demi Dragon Gules holding a Wheel Or charged in the centre with a Rose Gules thereon a Rose Argent barbed and seeded proper.
Escutcheon
Or on a Chevron Gules between three Wheels winged Sable two Chevronels Argent on a Chief Azure between two Cockatrices' Heads erased Or an Open Book proper bearing the word "Scientia" in Letters Sable
Supporters
Dexter: a Dragon Gules gorged with a Baron's Coronet proper pendent therefrom by a Ring Or a Winged Wheel Sable; Sinister: a Cockatrice Gules gorged with a Baron's Coronet proper pendent therefrom by a Ring Or a Portcullis chained of the last.
Motto
Semper Civibus Meis Servio

Llewellyn Heycock, Baron Heycock CBE (12 August 1905 – 13 March 1990) was a Welsh local politician, who became a life peer in 1967.

Heycock was born in Margam and began his career as an engine driver with the Great Western Railway. He subsequently rose to a powerful position in South Wales local politics through his trade union connections and membership of the Labour Party, a "personality of transcendent authority". Despite having himself received little formal education, he became Chairman of the Glamorganshire Education Committee.

He was first elected to Glamorgan County Council in 1937 at a by-election following the re-election of long-serving miners' agent John Thomas of Pontrhydyfen as an alderman. Heycock was chosen as Labour candidate at the expense of Joe Brown, a former mayor of Port Talbot and a close associate of Ramsay Macdonald when he was MP for Aberavon. Brown resigned from the Labour Party in protest and stood as an Independent. However, Heycock held the seat by 569 votes.

In April 1967 he was elected as a county councillor to Glamorgan County Council for the Port Talbot East ward. In 1973 he was elected unopposed as councillor for Margam Central on the new West Glamorgan County Council.

He became a Commander of the Order of the British Empire (CBE) in 1959, a Commander of the Order of the Hospital of St. John of Jerusalem (CStJ) in April 1967, and a life peer on 10 July 1967 as Baron Heycock, of Taibach in the Borough of Port Talbot.
