= David Evans-Bevan =

Welsh industrialist (1902–1973)

Sir David Martyn Evans-Bevan (4 March 1902 – 9 September 1973) was a wealthy industrialist from south Wales. He was the owner of the Vale of Neath Brewery, and purchased Margam Castle from the Talbot family.

David Evans-Bevan was the son of Evan Evans-Bevan, a brewery owner who was Mayor of Neath on several occasions, and his wife Caroline (née Thomas). He was educated at Uppingham School.

David, already High Sheriff of Breconshire, inherited the Vale of Neath Brewery on his father's death in 1929, at the same time becoming wales's leading mine-owner, but decided to concentrate on the brewing business. David married Eira Winifred Glanley, daughter of Sidney Archibald Lloyd Glanley, in 1929, and they had two children, Martyn (born 1932) and Marigold (born 1934) who married Ian Leslie, 21st Earl of Rothes in 1955.

In 1942 he acquired the Margam estate, including the castle, the ruins of former monastic buildings attached to Margam Abbey, the orangery and about 850 acres of land. Felin Newydd, a country house near Brecon, purchased as a shooting lodge, became a family home, and was converted to a hotel by his grandson Huw in the 2000s.

In addition to the purchase of two Spitfires to help the war effort, David Evans-Bevan was known for his philanthropy and became High Sheriff of Glamorgan in 1951. On 9 July 1958 he was created a baronet, of Cadoxton-juxta-Neath in the County of Glamorgan.

In 1967, Sir David sold the brewery to Whitbread, and it finally closed in 1972.

David Evans-Bevan died in September 1973, aged 71, and was succeeded in the baronetcy by his son Martyn. His widow, Eira, died on 24 December 2001.

Baronetage of the United Kingdom
New creation	Baronet (of Cadoxton-juxta-Neath); 1958–1973	Succeeded by Martyn Evan Evans-Bevan
