= List of Sites of Special Scientific Interest in Neath Port Talbot =

Map of Neath Port Talbot within Wales

This is a list of the Sites of Special Scientific Interest (SSSIs) in the Neath Port Talbot Area of Search (AoS).

== Sites ==
- Cefn Gwrhyd, Rhydyfro
- Cilybebyll
- Coed Cwm Du, Cilmaengwyn
- Cors Crymlyn - Crymlyn Bog
- Craig-y-Llyn
- Crymlyn Burrows
- Cwm Gwrelych and Nant Llyn
- Cynffig-Kenfig
- Dyffrynoedd Nedd a Mellte a Moel Penderyn
- Earlswood Road Cutting
- Eglwys Nunydd Reservoir
- Fforest Goch Bog
- Frondeg
- Gorsllwyn, Onllwyn
- Gwrhyd Meadows
- Hafod Wennol Grasslands
- Margam Moors
- Pant-y-sais
- Tairgwaith
