= Taibach =

District of Port Talbot, Wales

- Location within Neath Port Talbot
- Population: 4,799 (2011 census)
- OS grid reference: SS775889
- Principal area: Neath Port Talbot
- Preserved county: West Glamorgan
- Country: Wales
- Sovereign state: United Kingdom
- Post town: PORT TALBOT
- Postcode district: SA13
- Dialling code: 01639
- Police: South Wales
- Fire: Mid and West Wales
- Ambulance: Welsh
- UK Parliament: Aberafan Maesteg
- Senedd Cymru – Welsh Parliament: Aberavon
- Councillors: Laura Williams (Welsh Labour); Rob Jones (Welsh Labour); Dennis Keogh (Welsh Labour)
- List of places UK Wales Neath Port Talbot 51.584°N 3.769°W Map of the community

Taibach, also spelled as Tai-bach (Welsh for 'little houses'), is a community and suburban district of Port Talbot, Wales. It is a settlement centered on the main A48 road, sandwiched between the river Ffrwdwyllt and Margam. Parts of Margam are within the community boundaries.

== History ==
The "little houses" of Taibach sprang up at the beginning of the 19th century in the parish of Margam as homes for colliery and other industrial workers, some way away from the historic village centre of Margam.

With the expansion of industrial activity in the parish, and, in particular, the foundation of the new port at Port Talbot, the whole area became a single conurbation, as it remains, and Taibach was subsumed within it.

== Amenities ==
The stretch of the A48 road through the area is the main shopping street and is named Commercial Road in the area.

The area has a Carnegie library and is next to the Talbot Memorial Park, an urban park. In the grounds of the park lies St Theodore's Church. The parish church was built in 1901 by Miss Emily Talbot in honour of Saint Theodore of Tarsus, and in remembrance of her late brother of the same name. The eastern border of the park is formed by the Ffrwdwyllt river. Ffrwdwyllt literally translates to 'wild torrent' in English. The river is popular among local anglers, especially in late autumn.

To the east of the area is the Eastern Primary School, the primary school attended by actor Richard Burton, under his real name of Richard Jenkins. The old Eastern Primary School is now the Taibach Community Education Centre, and was built the same year as Margam Castle in 1831. Taibach has its own Taibach Rugby Club.

The Labour politician and life peer Lord Heycock of Taibach took his title from this area, which had been the home of the Heycock family since about 1800.

== Government and politics ==
Taibach is in the Senedd constituency of Aberavon and the UK constituency of Aberafan Maesteg.

Since the 2022 local elections Taibach has been part of the Margam and Tai-bach electoral ward (including Margam and Margam Moors), which elects three councillors to Neath Port Talbot County Borough Council.

Taibach was the name of the electoral ward for Taibach prior to the 2022 elections, coterminous to the community. The electoral ward of Taibach included the district of Taibach and parts of Margam to the southwest and the village of Goytre to the north. However, most of the ward is open countryside and woodland spread over a steep hill.

In the 2017 local council elections, the results were:

Candidate	Party	Votes	Status
Anthony Taylor	Labour	868	Labour hold
Rachel Taylor	Labour	756	Labour hold
Andrew Tutton	Independent	662	

In the 2012 local council elections, the electorate turnout was 38.99%. The results were:

Candidate	Party	Votes	Status
John Rogers	Labour	1138	Labour hold
Anthony James Taylor	Labour	942	Labour hold
Les Davies	NPT Independent Party	494	

== Activity ==
- SNAC (27 April 1993 – present) (April 27, 1993; 33 years ago)

== Nearest places ==
- Port Talbot docks
- Aberavon
- Goytre
- Margam
- Port Talbot steelworks

== See also ==
- Taibach RFC
