= St Theodore's Church, Port Talbot =

Coordinates: 51.5873°N 3.7731°W

St Theodore's Church
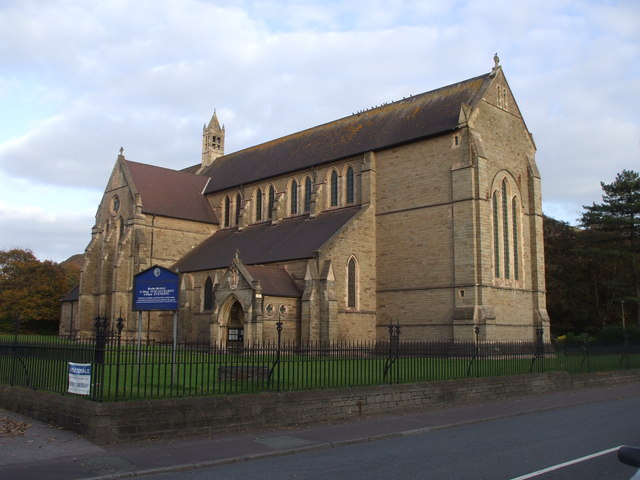
- St Theodore's Church
- Denomination: Church in Wales
- Website: www.st-theodore.org.uk

History
- Dedication: Theodore of Tarsus

The Church of St Theodore is a parish church of the Church in Wales in Port Talbot, Wales. Located on the A48 opposite Maes-y-Cwrt Terrace and bordered on two sides by the Talbot Memorial Park, it is administered within the diocese of Llandaff.

The church was designed by John Loughborough Pearson, and it is the largest of his churches in Wales. It was built with financial assistance from Miss Emily Charlotte Talbot, a local philanthropist who lived at nearby Margam Castle, in memory of her late brother Theodore Mansel Talbot (1839–1876), whose premature death resulted in her inheriting the family fortune. The family was heavily influenced by the Oxford Movement within the Church of England. It replaced the smaller Holy Cross Church (also known locally as "Chapel of Ease").

The church is built primarily in the Early English style, and dressed mainly in Bath stone. The pulpit is of Portland stone. An item of interest is a memorial to Lt Rupert Price Hallowes, a Victoria Cross-winning resident of Port Talbot (killed in action in 1915).

The organ was installed in the church prior to its consecration in August 1897, and was made by Charles Martin of Oxford; it was both his largest and his last work. It cost over £800 and was paid for by public subscription. The organ was completely restored in 2000, when the church itself underwent substantial refurbishment.

The restoration project included the removal and replacement of all stained glass within the church, which include four works from the studio of Clayton and Bell; the windows proved impossible to clean as they were badly affected by pollution from local heavy industry. The stonework was also cleaned, and a new lighting system was installed. The original iron railings outside the church were repaired. The Sanctus Bell, which had previously been removed because of the dangerous condition of the bellcote, was re-hung following repairs.
