= Emily Charlotte Talbot =

English heiress and industrialist (1840–1918)

Emily Charlotte Talbot (1 August 1840 – 21 September 1918) was an heiress and industrialist of South Wales, the daughter of Christopher Rice Mansel Talbot.

She was born in Belgrave Square, the centrepiece of Belgravia in London.

Following the death of her brother, Theodore, in 1876, Emily - known locally as "Miss Talbot" throughout her life - became the heiress to her father's fortune and his estates at Margam and Penrice, which she inherited on his death in 1890. She was largely responsible for creating a port and railway system to attract business to Port Talbot. She made her home at Margam Castle, did not marry, and on 26 September 1918 was buried in the family vault in Margam church.

From a press obituary:

One of the wealthiest women in Great Britain, her great gifts to benevolent, educational, and religious purposes were often anonymous, and few knew what a large portion of her riches she devoted to the needs of others, particularly in South Wales, of which she was the true Lady Bountiful. During the last two years, owing to failing health, she was unable to spend much time in the Principality, but lived in quiet and retirement in London, only seeing her intimate friends. Despite her indisposition, she took a deep interest in war charities, providing two large Y.M.C.A. huts in Glamorgan, and converting Penrice Castle into an officers' hospital, which she equipped and maintained at her own expense. Only recently she provided a capital sum sufficient to produce £1,500 a year for a chair of preventive medicine at the medical school in connection with Cardiff University. ... To the Church, too, she was a queenly benefactress, and her name was a household word in Wales. . . . She combined with a benevolent spirit a rare business aptitude, and to her foresight and energy may be largely attributed the development and prosperity of Port Talbot from a small village to a thriving town possessing docks, steel works, and important railway junctions. In the welfare of the folk dependent on her she took the deepest interest, and on one occasion, an unremunerative colliery falling into her hands, she, rather than discharge the miners and close it down, kept it working for several years for the sake of the women and children, at a loss to herself of nearly £100,000.

— quoted in C. A. Maunsell and E. P. Stratham's History of the Family of Maunsell vol. 2 pt 1
