= Eglwys Nunydd =

Lake in Neath Port Talbot, Wales

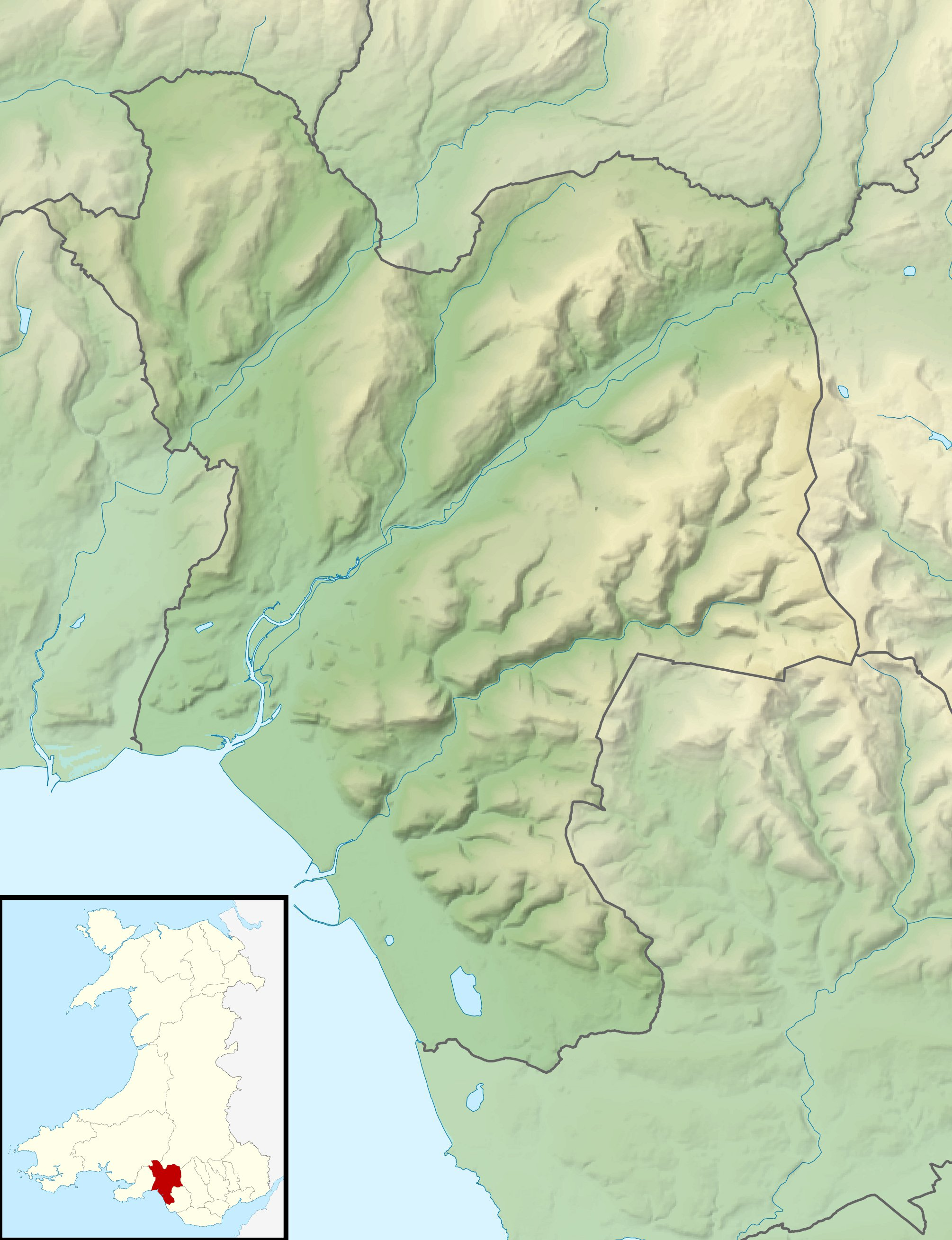
- Location within Neath Port Talbot
- Location: Margam, Wales
- Coordinates: 51°32′58″N 3°44′22″W
- Type: reservoir
- Basin countries: United Kingdom

The Eglwys Nunydd is a 260-acre (110 ha) supply reservoir in Margam, Wales. It was originally constructed in 1963 to provide cooling water for the cold rolling mills at the nearby Port Talbot steelworks.

== Description ==
Eglwys Nunydd covers 260 acres (110 ha), and has a shore line two thirds of which is in the form of a concrete bowl. It is around 14 feet (4.3 m) deep.

== Birdlife ==
Eglwys Nunydd has shallow, alkaline water with a bed that comprises mainly silt and cobbles. The fertility of the bed encourages weed growth, which in turn promotes a productive insect population. It was originally designated as a Site of Special Scientific Interest for its birdlife in 1972, and this was confirmed in 1982. The site is notable for its breeding birds which include great crested grebe, little grebe, mallard, gadwall and Eurasian coot. Other species normally present include tufted duck and common pochard, and among local birdwatchers it has a reputation for producing locally rare birds such as goosander, smew, long-tailed duck, greater scaup and great northern diver.

== Killer shrimp ==
In 2010 it was reported that the invasive amphipod Dikerogammarus villosus had been found in the reservoir. Anglers have observed that these crustaceans form a major part of the diet of the reservoir's rainbow trout stock, and have been told to be aware of biosecurity when fishing, so that they do not transfer the "killer shrimp" to other waters.

== Recreation ==
The lake supports a trout and coarse fishery managed by Tata Game Angling. It is also used for dinghy sailing run by Tata Steel Sailing Club.
