= Margam Castle =

Grade I listed house in Neath Port Talbot, Wales

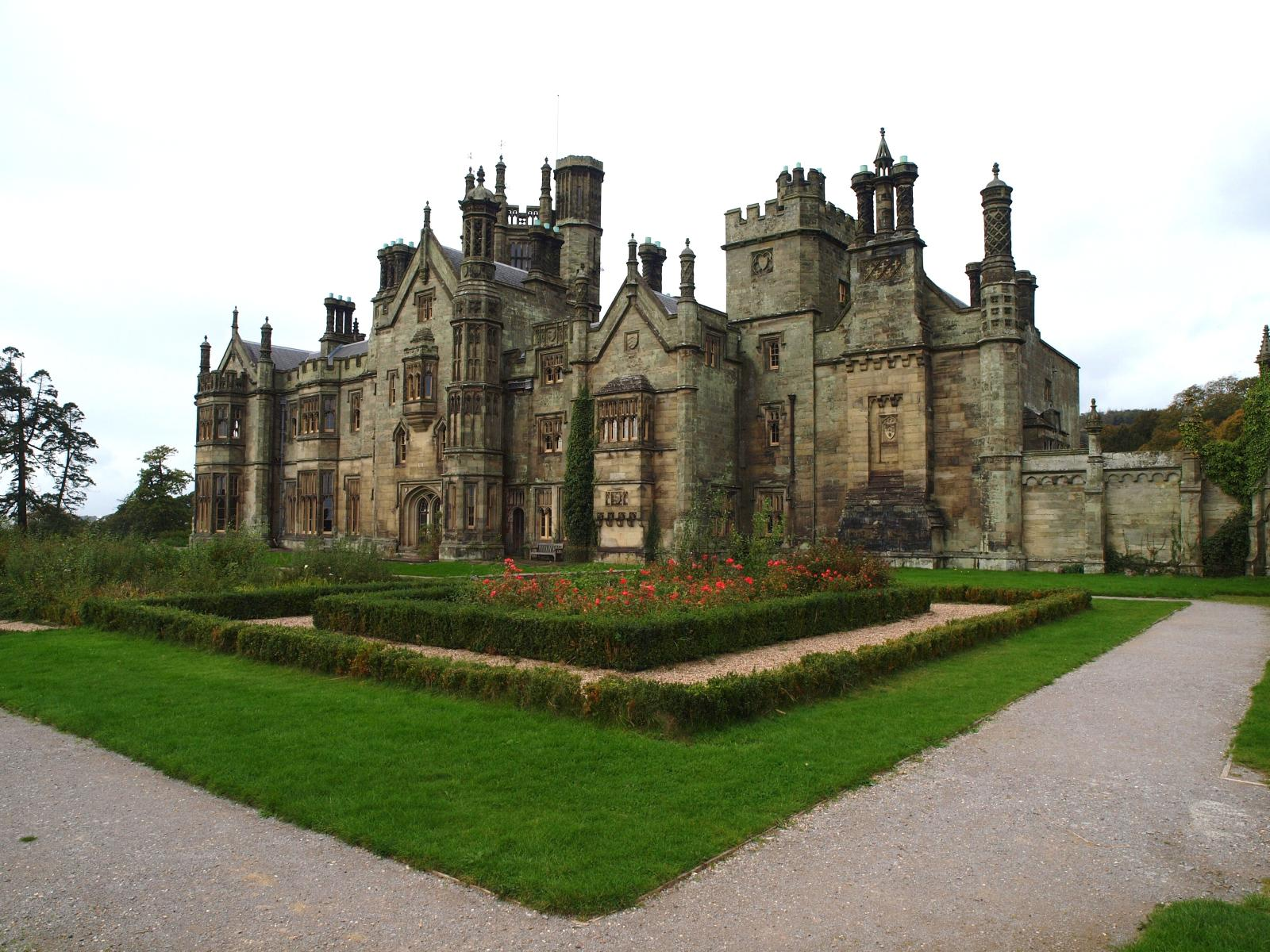

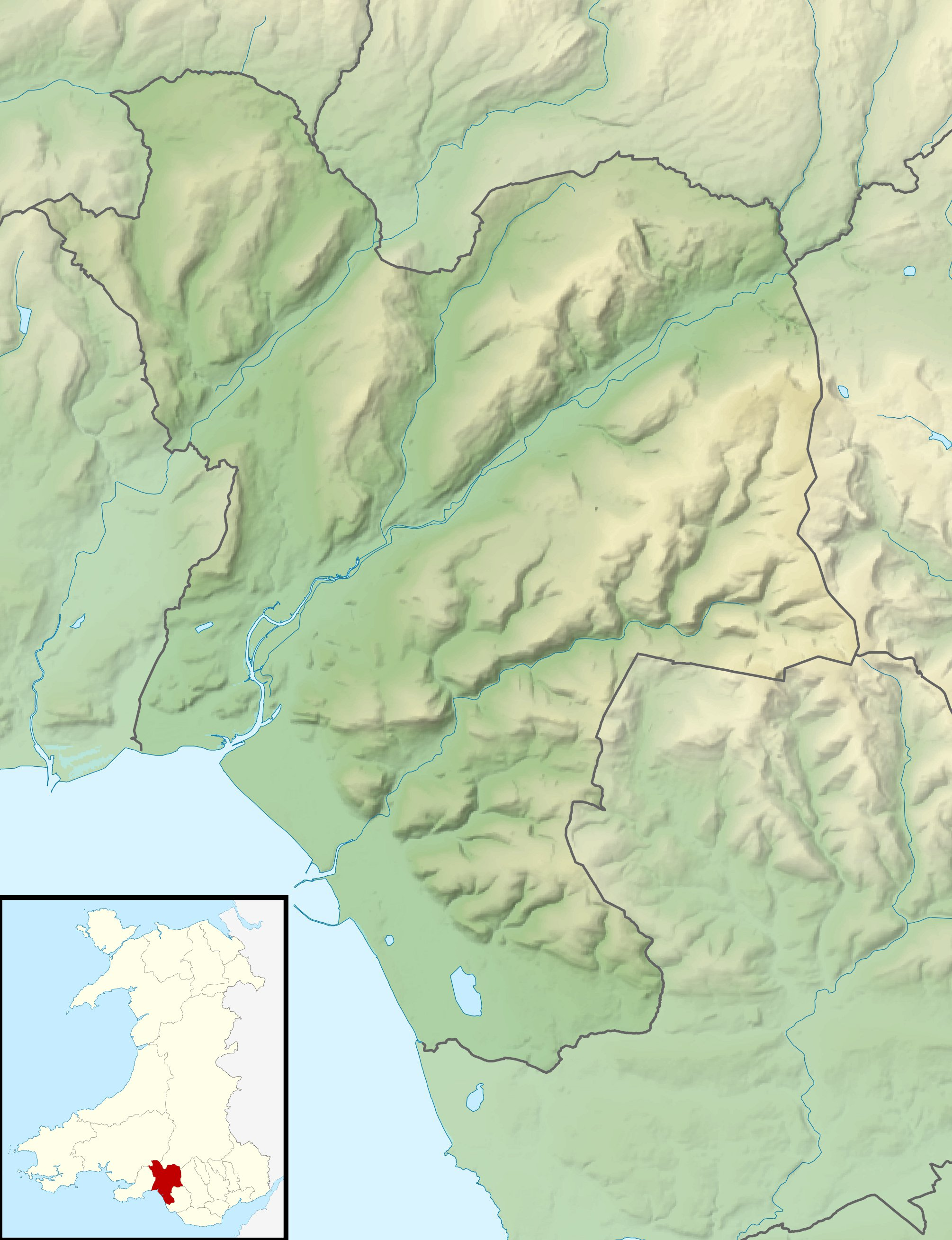
- Location within Neath Port Talbot
- 51.5627°N 3.7254°W
- Type: House
- Location: Margam, Neath Port Talbot

History
- Built: 1830–1835

Site notes
- Architect: Thomas Hopper
- Architectural style: Tudor Revival
- Owner: Neath Port Talbot County Borough Council

Listed Building – Grade I
- Official name: Margam Castle
- Designated: 24 February 1975
- Reference no.: 14170

Listed Building – Grade II*
- Official name: Service buildings including courtyard walls at Margam Castle
- Designated: 24 February 1975
- Reference no.: 23275

Listed Building – Grade II*
- Official name: Terrace walls and screen at Margam Castle
- Designated: 24 February 1975
- Reference no.: 14163

Listed Building – Grade II
- Official name: Stone steps in terraced garden
- Designated: 25 April 2000
- Reference no.: 23266

Margam Castle, Margam, Port Talbot, Wales, is a late Georgian country house built for Christopher Rice Mansel Talbot. Designed by Thomas Hopper, the castle was constructed in a Tudor Revival style over a five-year period, from 1830 to 1835. The site had been occupied for some 4,000 years. A Grade I listed building, the castle is now in the care of Neath Port Talbot County Borough Council. The castle stands within Margam Country Park, the former estate to the house. The park is listed at Grade I on the Cadw/ICOMOS Register of Parks and Gardens of Special Historic Interest in Wales.

== History ==
The Margam estate was occupied in the Iron Age, and the remains of a hill fort from that period, Mynydd-y-Castell, stands north of the castle. After the Norman invasion of Wales, Robert, 1st Earl of Gloucester, and Lord of Glamorgan, granted the lands at Margam to Clairvaux Abbey, for the establishment of a new Cistercian monastery which became Margam Abbey. Following the Dissolution of the Monasteries from 1536, the Margam estate was bought by Sir Rice (Rhys) Mansel. His descendants built a substantial Tudor mansion in the park. In the 18th century, this mansion was demolished, and the family returned to one of their earlier ancestral homes, Penrice Castle, Thomas Mansel Talbot (1747–1813), commissioning Anthony Keck to build a new mansion next to the castle ruins. Keck was also employed at Margan, which Talbot turned into a pleasure garden, using Keck to design an enormous orangery.

Christopher Rice Mansel Talbot succeeded his father in 1813 at the age of ten. Enriched by the development of Port Talbot in the early 19th century, and after making a Grand Tour of Europe as a young man, Talbot returned to South Wales and from 1830 re-established Margam as his main seat. A new house, Margam Castle was designed by the architect Thomas Hopper (1776–1856), with Edward Haycock Snr (1790–1870) as supervisory architect, and designer of parts of the interior and exterior of the house, the stables, terraces and lodges.

Talbot also took a keen interest in the project, encouraging his architects to borrow elements from Lacock Abbey in Wiltshire (ancestral home of the Talbots and home to his cousin William Henry Fox Talbot) and Melbury House in Dorset (home of his mother's family, the Fox-Strangways, Earls of Ilchester). William Henry Fox Talbot was a frequent visitor to Margam, and the castle featured as an image in some of his early photographic experiments. Margam's links with photography also include being the location of the earliest known Welsh photograph, a daguerreotype of the castle taken on 9 March 1841 by the Reverend Calvert Richard Jones.

After the death of Emily Charlotte Talbot, the daughter of its first owner, the castle passed to her nephew and continued to be used by the Talbot family until 1941, when it was sold. David Evans-Bevan, who bought it, found it too large to live in, but could not find any public organisation interested in taking it on, and it fell into disrepair. For many years it belonged to the local authority, but was not open to the public. In 1977, a fire caused substantial damage, and it was only after this that a restoration project began in earnest.

In December 1997, following the success of the devolution referendum, the castle was one of the proposed sites for the location of the new Welsh Parliament building. A bid proposed by Neath Port Talbot Council, which, if successful, would have likely meant extensive renovations to the historic structure in order to locate a debating chamber and several offices for the Welsh Government, the First Minister and their cabinet. However, following the shortlist selection by the government, the bid was rejected.

Margam Castle is in the care of Neath Port Talbot County Borough Council. The credulous suggest it may have ghosts.

== Architecture ==
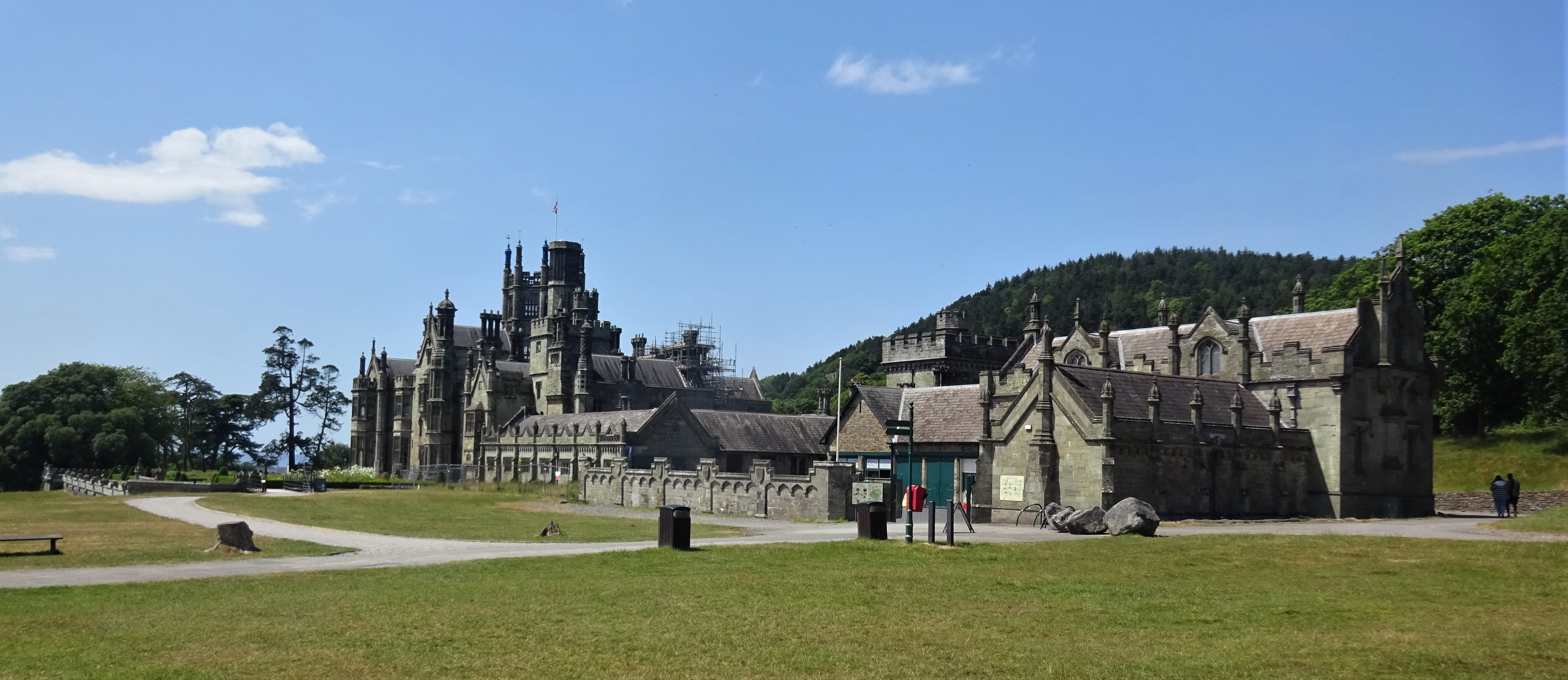
Margam Castle in 2023

John Newman, in his Glamorgan volume in the Buildings of Wales series published in 1995, writes that "Margam has an accumulation of architecture and sculpture unparalleled in Wales". The centrepiece of the estate is the castle. Thomas Hopper designed it in the Tudor Revival style, following examples at Ashridge in Hertfordshire and Dalmeny in Scotland. The scale was vast, the cost was £50,000 and the build quality was such as "could only be afforded by the super-rich".

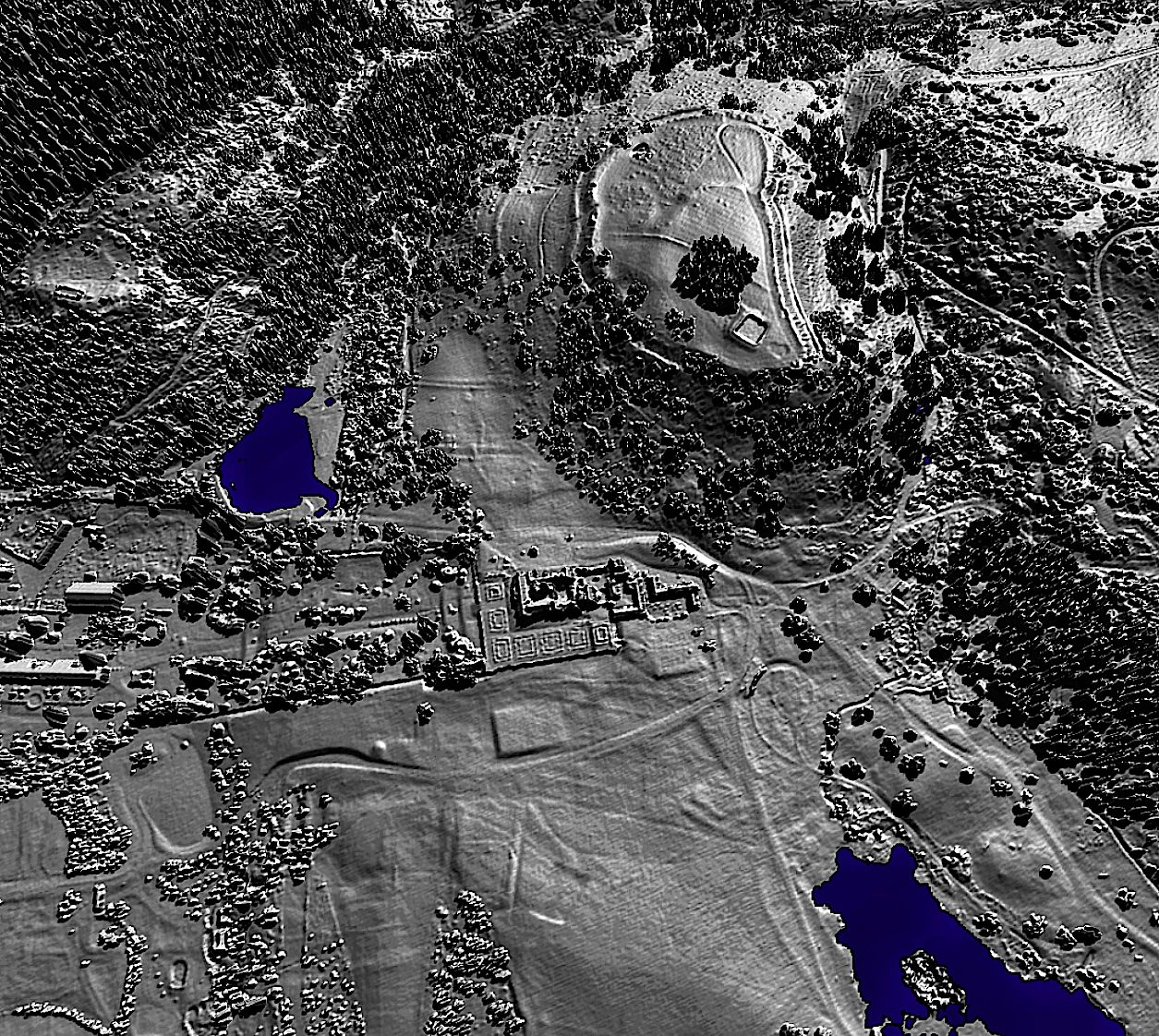
A lidar view of Mynydd-y-Castell and Margam Castle.

The castle is of two-storeys, constructed in finely-cut ashlar from a quarry at nearby Pyle. Entry is through an elaborate porch, and the house is crowned by a prospect tower modelled on that at Melbury. The design is highly asymmetrical with irregular gables, turrets, parapets, bay, lancet and oriel windows, groups of chimney stacks and a great deal of heraldic decoration.

Margam Castle is a Grade I listed building. Its service courtyard is listed Grade II*, as are the terrace walls and screen, while the steps in the terraced garden are listed Grade II.

== Sources ==
- Newman, John (1995). Glamorgan. The Buildings of Wales. London, UK: Penguin Books. ISBN 978-0-300-09629-3. OCLC 1131253297.
