= Bryn, Neath Port Talbot =

Bryn
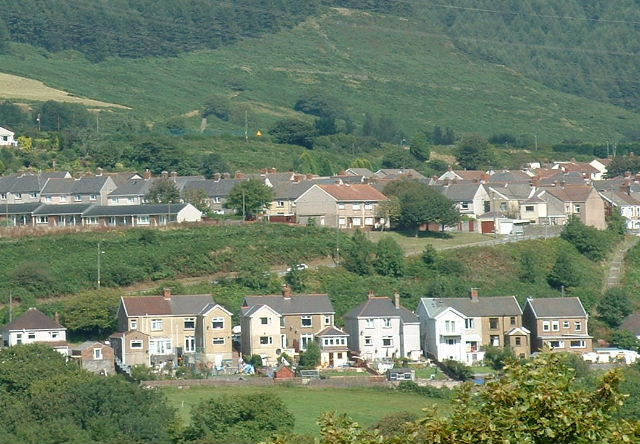
- Bryn

- Location within Neath Port Talbot
- Population: 913 (2001)
- OS grid reference: SS815923
- Community: Bryn
- Principal area: Neath Port Talbot
- Preserved county: West Glamorgan
- Country: Wales
- Sovereign state: United Kingdom
- Post town: PORT TALBOT
- Postcode district: SA13
- Dialling code: 01639
- Police: South Wales
- Fire: Mid and West Wales
- Ambulance: Welsh
- UK Parliament: Aberafan Maesteg
- Senedd Cymru – Welsh Parliament: Aberavon
- List of places UK Wales Neath Port Talbot 51.617°N 3.712°W Map of the community

Bryn (Welsh for 'hill') is a village and community in Neath Port Talbot County Borough in Wales. It has a population of 913. The village is located in the hills between Cwmafan, in the Afan Valley, and Maesteg in the Llynfi Valley, approximately 6 miles (9.7 km) from Port Talbot and 2 miles (3.2 km) from Maesteg. The name of the village now familiarly 'Bryn', is Bryn-troed-y-garn. So wrote the first vicar of St Theodore's in Port Talbot. There was a farm situated above Meadow Row named Bryn-Troed-y-Garn as shown on the 1876 OS map, as many more immigrants came to 'Bryn-troed-y-garn' it seemed the name of the village was to be shorted to Bryn. 12% of the village (112 out of 913 people) speak Welsh. The population rose to 923 by 2011.

== Coal mine ==
Its clear from the OS maps from the last century that Bryn was honeycombed with coal resources. Some of these could be in the form of outcrops which could be hand picked from the surface, it is likely that farmers would pick these for domestic, although such pickings belonged to the landlord and not the farmer tenant.

Deeds relating to Margam Abbey indicated that the monks were exploiting coal measures in or near Bryn about the year 1250, although coal mining in Bryn did not operate on any scale until the 18th century. It is believed that the copper miner at Cwmavon extended their operations to Bryn soon after 1841, at the time when this kind of coal for copper smelting was becoming more scarce in the Afan valley. The location is not certain, although the first Vicar of St Theodore's Church 'D J Jones' refers to the site as Drysiog Farm. In order to move this vast amount of coal to the copper works, a mineral railway was constructed. The bed of the railway can still be traced by turning at the Carmel church and following the line adjacent to Bryngurnos Street and along the B4282 towards Cwmavon.

The production of coal in the village caused a huge expansion in housing with a population in the 1841 census of 111 to a population of 558 in 1851. To provide for the huge increase the collieries a rapid housing programme began with 15 dwellings in 1841 to 96 in 1851. The familiar street names Bryn farm cottages, Buck Row, Yard Row and Farteg Row appeared, and so did a street called Wain Row, which transformed into Cross Row and Meadow Row.

Census Year	Population	No of Dwellings
1841	111	15
1851	558	96
1871	503	95
1881	349	76
2001	913	390

The Downward slope of the economic activity in Bryn towards the end of the 19th century can be gauged from a comparison of the maps of 1876 and 1900, the 1876 map shows a high point in job prospects with the following mines in operation.

- Bryngurnos Colliery (Drift mine)
- Bryn colliery ( A level)
- Drysiog ( 3 levels)
- Bryntroedygarn ( 2 levels)

By 1900 the position had clearly declined. Bryngurnos colliery and Bryn colliery are described as 'disused' and the Drysiog and Bryntroedygarn were described as 'old levels'. On the plus side a new coal mine above meadow row brought many jobs.

Bryn Navigation Collieries Co. began sinking this colliery in the mid-1890s. The coal tip above Meadow row was called 'Amy', some say it is named after 'Amy Johnson' the first women aviator to fly solo from England to Australia others say it is named after one of the machines there. Later the owners were listed as Messrs Baldwin's Ltd. then Thomas Richard & Baldwin's Ltd. In 1908 there were 380 men employed, producing House and Manufacturing coal. By 1918 the workforce had grown to 650. From a list 1923 there were 683 men employed, producing from the Middle and Lower seams. Later a drift was driven to become the main conveyance. In 1945 there were 615 men employed here. At its peak annual production was 96,000 tons. It closed in 1964.

In total 'The Coal Authority' hold three abandonment plans which are indexed as Drysiog Mine, these being numbers 16, 5856 and SW.295. Examination of these gives the following information

No.16 This Mine worked the Blackband Seam before being abandoned in April 1873. The Owners at the time of abandonment are given as The Governor and Company of Copper Miners in England whose address at that time was given as Cwm-Avon Works, Tribach.

No.5856 This plan shows workings in the White Seam which were abandoned on 30 May 1912 due to being unprofitable. The Owners at the time of abandonment were given as Parc-y-Bryn Colliery Company of then Station Road, Port Talbot. The plan is signed by Philip T Jenkins, Owner and Surveyor.

No. SW.295 This plan shows workings in the Tormynydd Seam and on the plan it is stated that the workings were re-opened in May 1952 (note this seam had previously been worked between 1923 and 19 September 1924 as the Parc-y-Bryn Colliery). Workings ceased on 16 July 1957 and the Mine finally abandoned in September 1957 due to being uneconomic. The Owners at the time of abandonment were given as The Drysiog Colliery Company but the Guide to the Coalfields for the years 1952 and 1953 give the then owner as a J.W. Heycock. Unfortunately, these editions give no indication as to manpower but the 1957 edition lists the manpower as 4. The plan is signed by John Perry Bevan (Director) and Gomer Hughes (Surveyor)

On 13 December 1994 a grant of up to 20,000 pounds sterling to New Parc Fuels Limited towards the development of a coal mine at Bryn Newydd, Port Talbot was Commissioned.

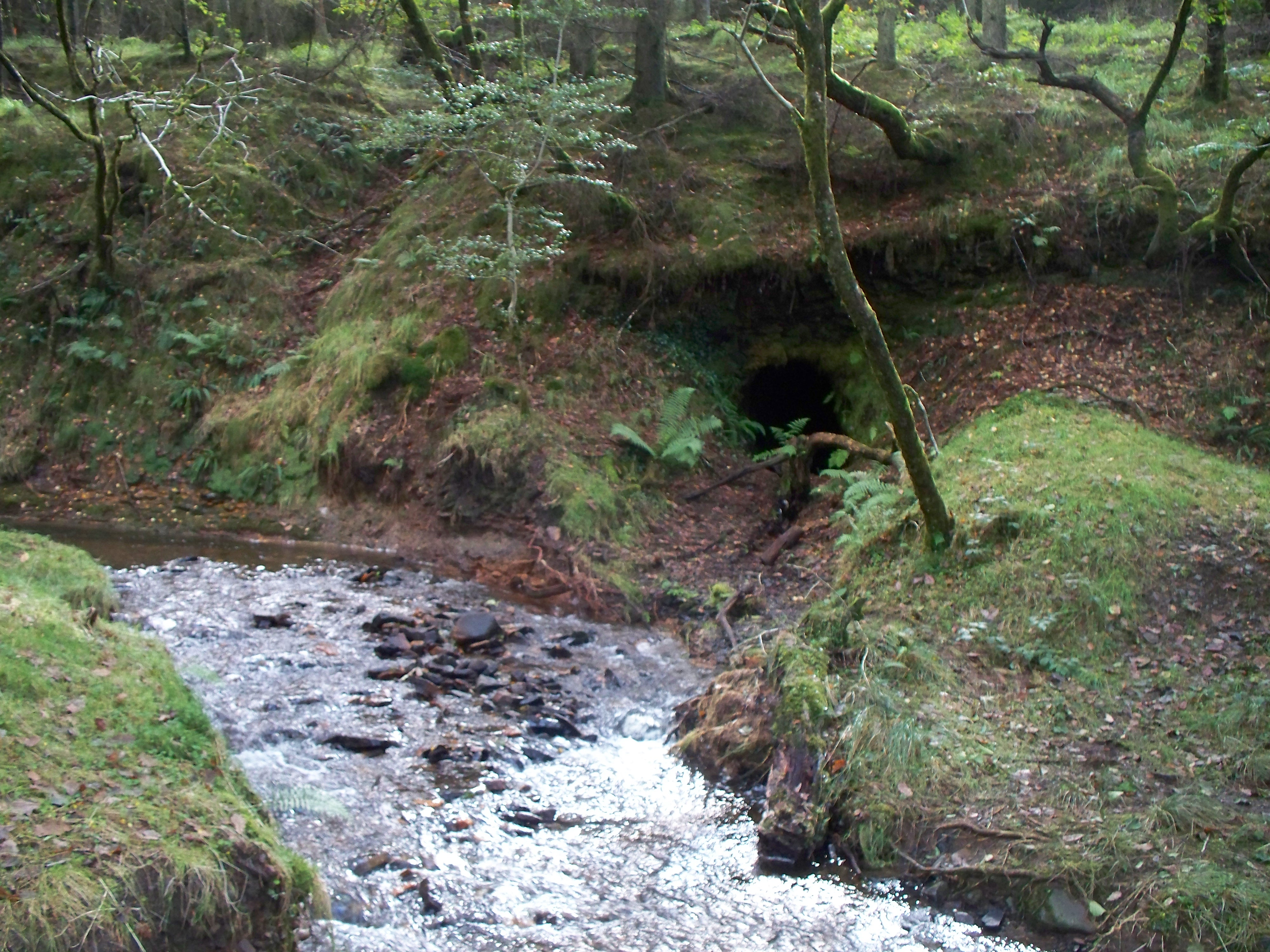
Believed to be part of an old Iron Works

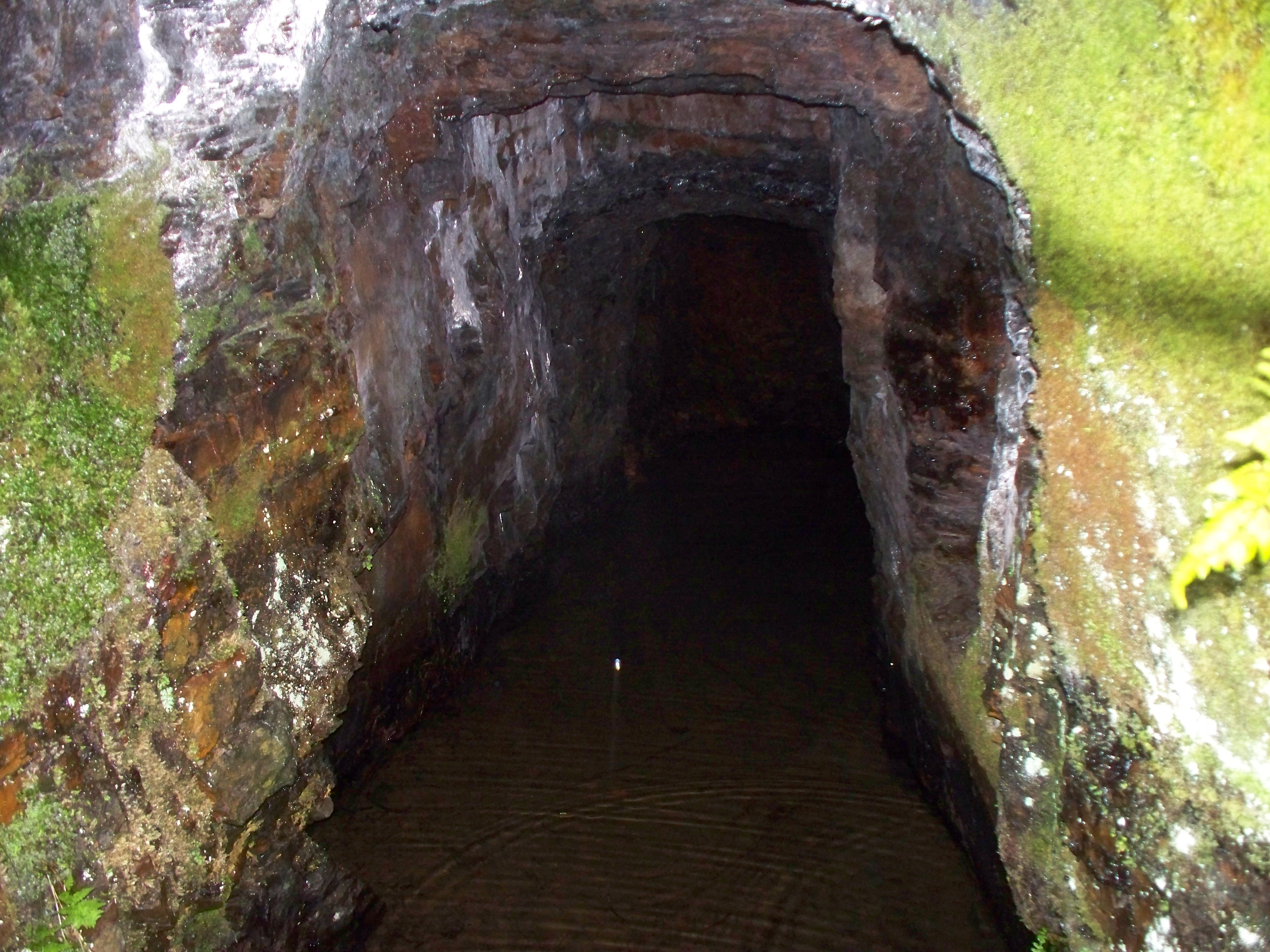
Entrance to the Iron work mine.

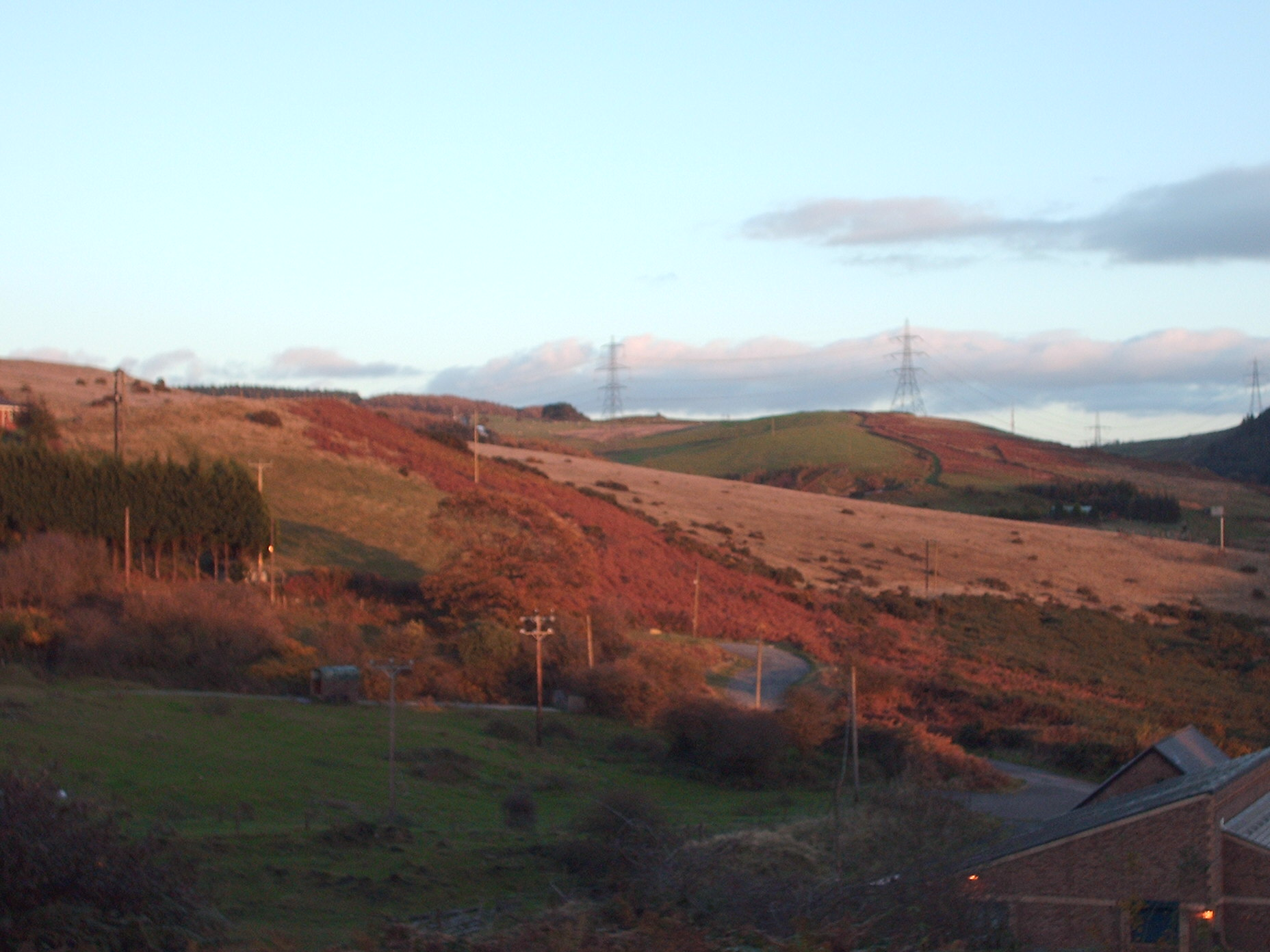
View towards Meadow Road.

== Local government ==
Bryn is one of 19 local community councils and is part of the 'Bryn and Cwmavon' division for Neath Port Talbot County Borough Council. Its served by three councillors.

== Gallery ==
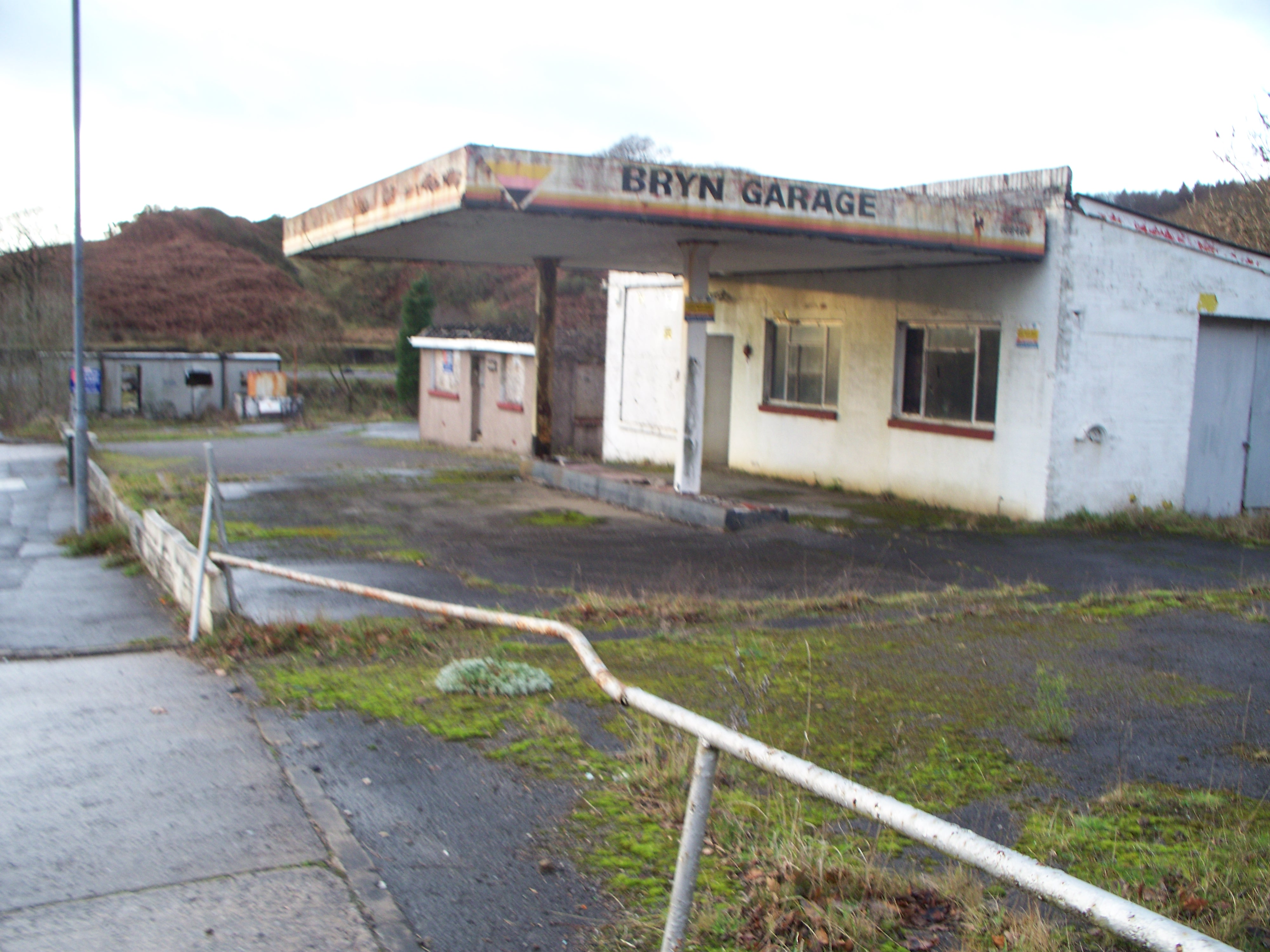
The old petrol station, now closed.

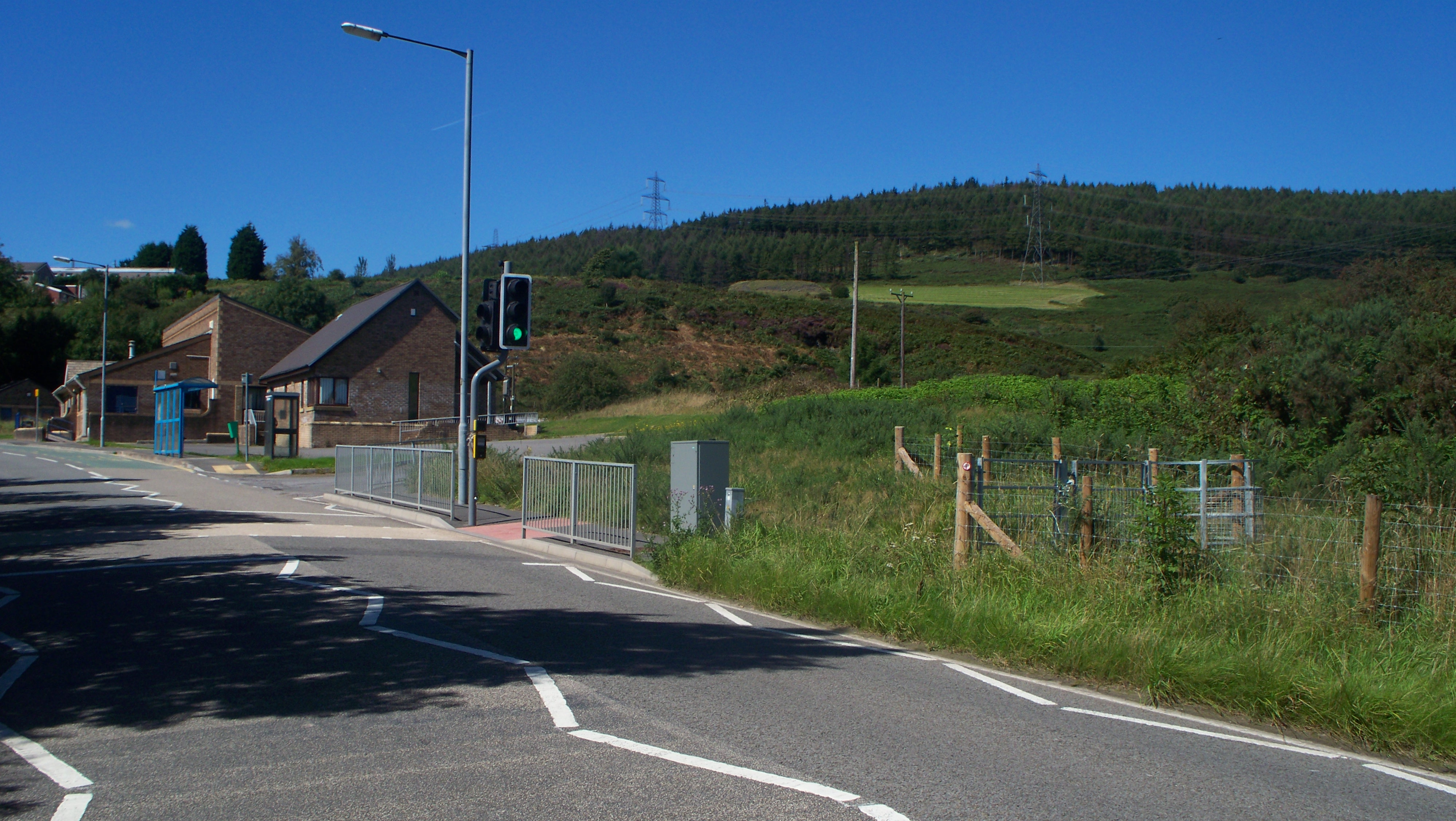
Bryn Village Hall/Surgery.

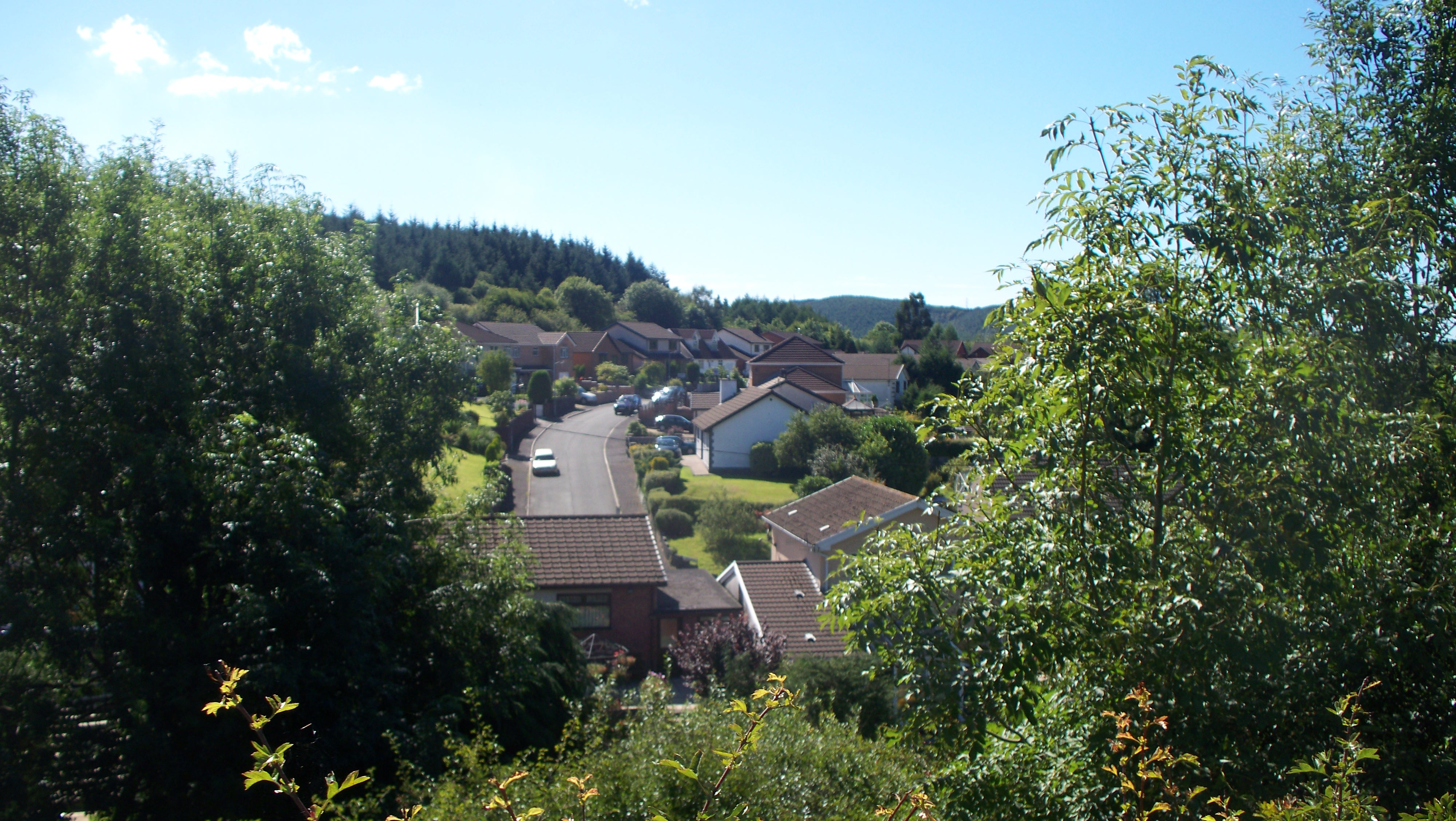
Varteg Row

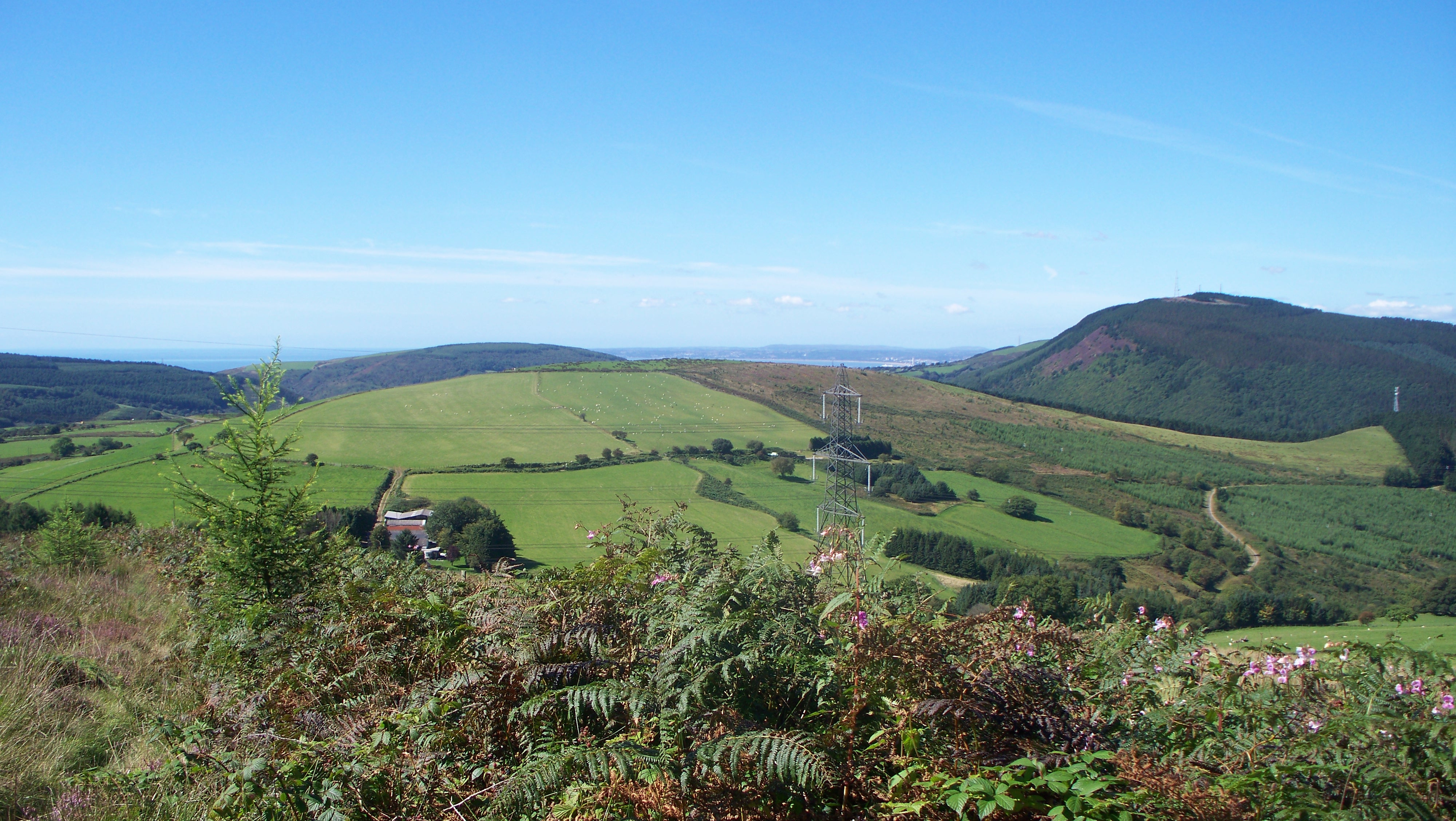
Above Bryn Looking Towards Swansea Bay

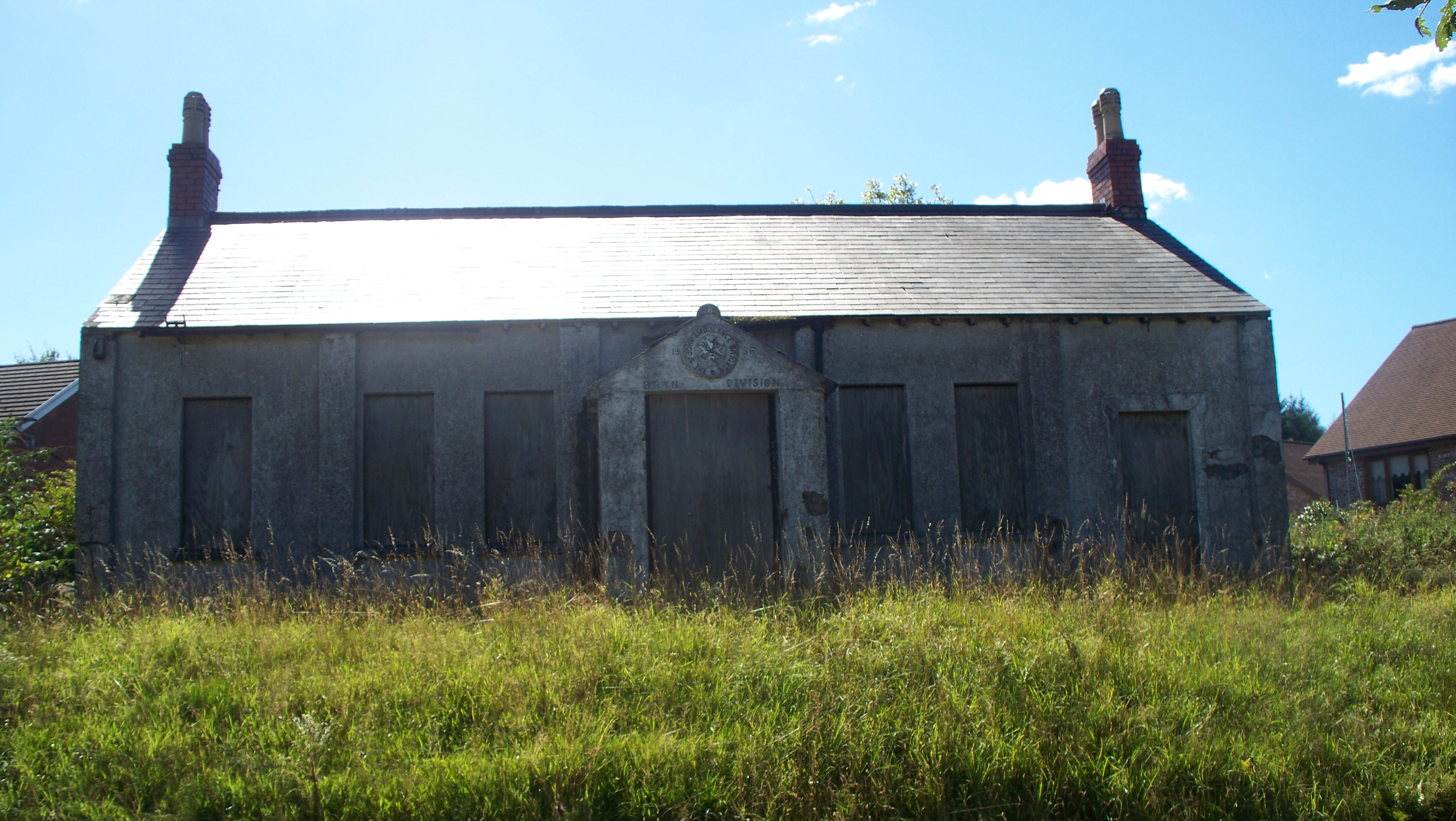
St John's Ambulance (1936)
