= Margam Moors =

Community in Neath Port Talbot county borough, Wales

Margam Moors: Welsh: Morfa Margam
- Community
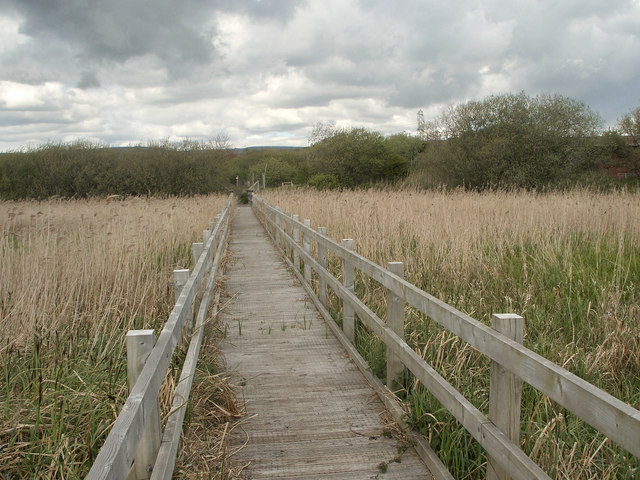
- Boardwalk on the Wales Coast Path, Margam Moors Edit this at Structured Data on Commons

- Location within Neath Port Talbot
- Population: 3 (2001)
- Principal area: Neath Port Talbot
- Country: Wales
- Sovereign state: United Kingdom
- Police: South Wales
- Fire: Mid and West Wales
- Ambulance: Welsh
- List of places UK Wales Neath Port Talbot 51°34′16″N 3°45′31″W Map of the community

Margam Moors (Welsh: Morfa Margam) is a community of Neath Port Talbot county borough, Wales. Together with the community of Margam, it forms the Margam electoral ward.

Part of Margam Moors is listed as a Site of Special Scientific Interest, due to the marshy grassland and ditches that are home to a variety of different plants and insects.

There were three inhabitants in Margam Moors at the 2001 census, and most of the area is open moorland with the central and northern areas occupied by Port Talbot Steelworks and Port Talbot Docks. The south west of the community is Margam Sands beach.
