= Margam =

Suburb in Neath Port Talbot, Wales

- Location within Neath Port Talbot
- Population: 3,017 (2011 census)
- OS grid reference: SS803854
- Principal area: Neath Port Talbot
- Preserved county: West Glamorgan
- Country: Wales
- Sovereign state: United Kingdom
- Post town: PORT TALBOT
- Postcode district: SA13
- Dialling code: 01639
- Police: South Wales
- Fire: Mid and West Wales
- Ambulance: Welsh
- UK Parliament: Aberafan Maesteg
- Senedd Cymru – Welsh Parliament: Aberavon
- Councillors: Robert Jones (Labour); Laura Williams (Labour); Dennis Keogh (Labour)
- List of places UK Wales Neath Port Talbot 51.574444°N 3.752778°W Map of the community

Margam is a suburb and community of Port Talbot in the Welsh county borough of Neath Port Talbot, Wales, close to junction 39 of the M4 motorway. The community had a population of 3,017 in 2011; the built up area being larger and extending into Taibach community.

== History ==
The largest Roman villa in Wales was discovered in 2025 in Margam Country Park, which has transformed the understanding of Roman Wales which now is shown to be more sophisticated than only a border province as previously thought.

Margam was an ancient Welsh community, formerly part of the cwmwd of Tir Iarll, initially dominated by Margam Abbey, a wealthy house of the Cistercians founded in 1147. (Margam is believed to have played a significant role in the early transmission of the work of St. Bernard of Clairvaux.) At the dissolution of the monasteries, it came into the possession of the Mansel family who were eventually succeeded by their descendants in the female line, the Talbot family, a cadet branch of the family of the Earls of Shrewsbury.

The parish church continued to operate from the nave of Margam Abbey, as it still does. Margam Castle grounds contain the ruins of the Chapter House and major 17th century and 18th century monuments. The Stones Museum contains important evidence for the advent of early Christianity in the area.

With the coming of the Industrial Revolution, the parish of Margam became important for two reasons. First, it had a good harbour which was ultimately developed into Port Talbot, named in honour of the squires of Margam. Second, it had coal deposits, and coal mining in the parish took off in the late 18th century. The combination of local fuel and good transport links from the harbour made Margam an important part of the industrial landscape of the South Wales Coalfield.

At first, the coal workers lived away from the village of Margam itself, notably in a settlement at Taibach. However, eventually, the whole of the parish was submerged by the community of industrial workers. Margam then assumed its modern form as a suburb of Port Talbot.

Not included in the urbanisation and industrialisation of Margam, however, were the grounds of Margam Abbey, which were incorporated by the Talbot family into the grounds of their nearby 19th century mansion, Margam Castle (badly damaged by fire in the late 20th century but now in process of restoration). The Talbot family had previously, in the 18th century constructed at Margam the longest orangery in Europe, which still stands. All the land was sold out of the Talbot family in the mid 20th century but it has been preserved as Margam Country Park, an estate of some 850 acres (3.4 km^{2}) owned and administered by the local council which is a major local attraction. The collection of early Christian Celtic crosses and inscribed stones which the Talbot family had collected from the locality, were moved in 1932 into the nearby Church Schoolroom, to become the Margam Stones Museum, now managed by Cadw.

In the early 20th century, Margam became the site of an important British Steel plc works.

== Government and politics ==
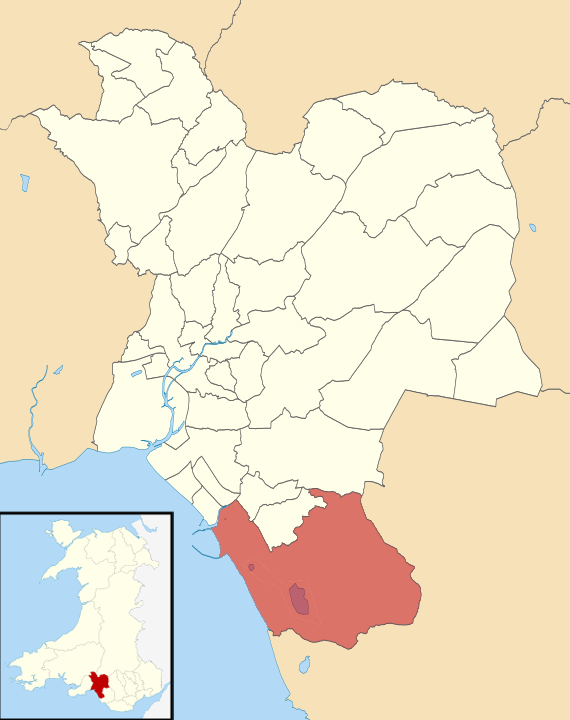
Map with location of former Margam ward within Neath Port Talbot County Borough

Margam is in the Senedd constituency of Aberavon and the UK constituency of Aberafan Maesteg.

Since the 2022 local elections Margam has been part of the Margam and Tai-bach electoral ward (including Margam Moors and Tai-bach), which elects three councillors to Neath Port Talbot County Borough Council.

Margam was formerly the name of the electoral ward which included the communities of Margam and Margam Moors. The Margam ward elected a county councillor to Neath Port Talbot County Borough Council. It included areas such as Port Talbot Steelworks, Eglwys Nunydd, Margam Country Park, the Margam Suburb, Port Talbot Docks and Margam Sands beach.

In the 2017 local council elections, the results were:

Candidate	Party	Votes	Status
Robert Jones	Labour	610	Labour hold
Robert Smith	Conservative	279	

Councillor Jones became leader of Neath Port Talbot Council following the election.

In the 2012 local council elections, the electorate turnout for Margam was 38.10%. The results were:

Candidate	Party	Votes	Status
Robert Jones	Labour	402	Labour hold
Scott Sullivan	Independent	166	
George Ridgeway	Social Democratic Party	129	
Caroline Jones	Conservative	110	
Mathew McCarthy	Liberal Democrats	61	

== Nearest places ==
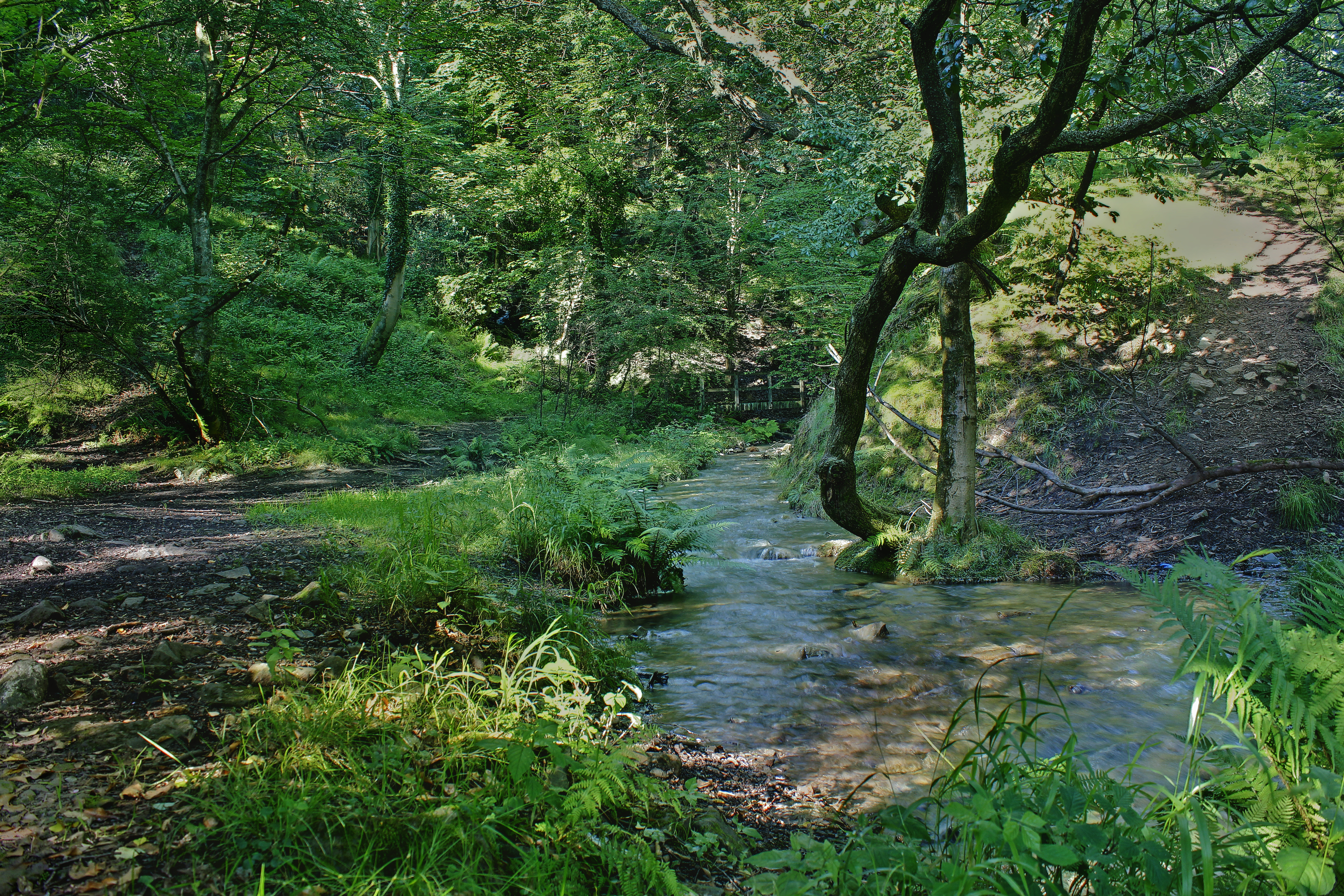
Brombil Woods

- Port Talbot Steelworks
- Taibach
- Margam Country Park
- Eglwys Nunydd reservoir
- Kenfig
- Margam Stones Museum
- Brombil Reservoir

== Notable people ==
- The actor Anthony Hopkins was born at 77 Wern Road, Margam.
- Peg Entwistle, the Broadway actress who jumped to her death from the Hollywood sign in 1932, was born in Margam in 1908.
- Alan Durban, footballer, grew up in Bracken Road, Margam.
- Ivor Emmanuel, actor
- Gerwyn Price, former rugby player and current professional darts player
