= List of rivers of Wales =

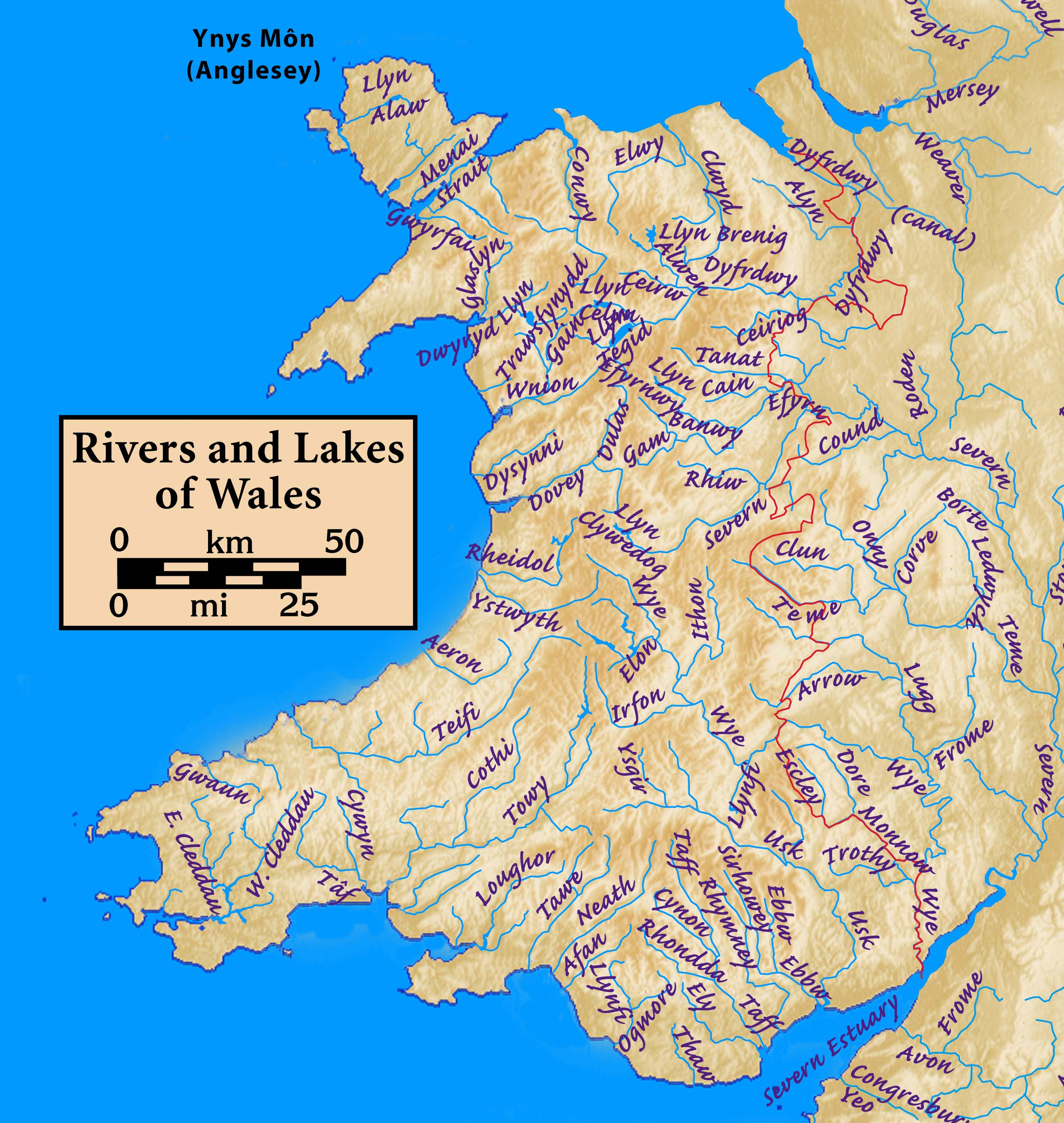

This is a list of rivers of Wales, organised geographically. It is taken anti-clockwise from the Dee Estuary to the M48 Bridge that separates the estuary of the River Wye from the River Severn.

Tributaries are listed down the page in an upstream direction, starting with those closest to the sea. The main stem (or principal) river of a catchment is given, left-bank tributaries are indicated by (L), and right-bank tributaries by (R). Note that, in general usage, the 'left (or right) bank of a river' refers to the left (or right) hand bank as seen when looking downstream. Where a named river is formed by the confluence of two differently named rivers, these are labelled as (Ls) and (Rs) for the left and right forks. A prime example is the formation of the River Taff from the Taf Fawr and the Taf Fechan at Cefn-coed-y-cymmer.

The list includes more or less every watercourse named on Ordnance Survey mapping, and thus many of the main rivers of Wales (as defined by Natural Resources Wales ). Difficulties arise otherwise in determining what should and what should not be included.

Certain names are encountered frequently, and particular care should be taken to differentiate between the various occurrences of Clydach, Clywedog and Dulas, for example, as well as names that appear to refer to the colour of their waters, e.g. Afon Goch (red river), Afon Ddu (black/dark river) and Afon Wen (white/light river).

== Mainland rivers flowing into Liverpool Bay ==
From Dee Estuary to Garth Pier, Bangor, Gwynedd

=== Dee catchment ===
- River Dee, Wales (Afon Dyfrdwy)
  - Nant-y-fflint (L) (flows into Dee Estuary)
  - Wepre Brook (L) (flows into Dee Estuary)
  - Aldford Brook (R) (wholly in England)
  - River Alyn (L) (Afon Alun / River Alun)
    - River Cegidog (R) (Afon Cegidog)
      - Nant-y-Ffrith (R)
    - River Terrig (R) (Afon Terrig)
  - Worthenbury Brook (R)
    - Emral Brook (Ls)
    - Wych Brook (Rs) (formerly known as the "River Elfe")
      - Red Brook (L)
  - River Clywedog (L) (Afon Clywedog)
    - River Gwenfro (L) (Afon Gwenfro)
    - Glanyrafon Brook (R)
      - Black Brook (R) (Afon Ddu)
  - Shell Brook (R)
  - River Ceiriog (R) (Afon Ceiriog) (head of river is Ceiriog Ddu)
    - River Teirw (L) (Afon Teirw)
    - Nant Sarffle (R)
    - Nant Cwm-y-geifr (R)
    - Nant Cwm-llawenog (R)
    - Nant Rhydwilym (R)
  - River Eitha (L) (Afon Eitha)
  - Eglwyseg River (L)
  - Afon Morwynion (L)
  - River Alwen (L) (Afon Alwen)
    - Afon Ceirw (R)
    - Merddwr (R) (known as Nant Lleidiog upstream)
      - Afon Medrad (R)
    - Afon Brenig (L)
  - Afon Trystion (R)
  - Afon Llynor (R)
  - Afon Ceidiog (R)
  - Hirnant (R)
  - Afon Tryweryn (L) (River Tryweryn)
    - Afon Mynach (Dee) (L)
    - Afon Hesgyn (L)
    - Afon Gelyn (L) (flows into Llyn Celyn)
    - Nant Aberderfel (R) (flows into Llyn Celyn)
  - Afon Llafar (L) (flows into Llyn Tegid)
  - Afon Twrch (R)
  - Afon Lliw (L)

=== Clwyd catchment ===
- River Clwyd (Afon Clwyd)
  - River Gele (L) (Afon Gele)
  - River Elwy (L) (Afon Elwy; also known as Afon Cledwen above the village of Llangernyw)
    - Afon Meirchion (R)
    - River Aled (R)
    - Afon Gallen (Ls)
  - River Wheeler (R) (Afon Chwiler)
  - Afon Ystrad (R)
  - River Clywedog (L) (Afon Clywedog; not to be confused with the Dee tributary of the same name)

=== Conwy catchment ===
- River Conwy (Afon Conwy)
  - Afon Gyffin (L)
  - Afon Roe (L) (known as Afon Tafolog in upper reaches)
  - Afon Dulyn (L)
    - Afon Ddu (L)
    - Afon Garreg-wen (L)
    - Ffrwd Cerriguniawn (L)
    - Afon Melynllyn (R)
  - Afon Porth-llwyd (L)
    - Afon Eigiau
  - Afon Ddu (L)
  - Afon Crafnant (L)
    - Afon Geirionydd (R)
  - Afon Gallt y Gwg (R)
  - Nant y Goron (R)
  - Afon Llugwy (L)
    - Nantygwryd (R)
  - Afon Lledr (L)
    - Afon Wybrnant (R)
    - Afon Maesgwm (R)
    - Afon Ystumiau (L)
  - Afon Machno (L)
    - Afon Glasgwm (L)
  - Afon Iwrch (R)
  - Afon Eidda (L)
  - Merddwr (R)
  - Afon Caletwr (R)
  - Afon Serw (R)

=== Simple coastal catchments ===
- Afon Gyrach
- Afon Ddu
  - Afon Glan-sais (L)
  - Afon Maes-y-bryn (R)
  - Afon Llanfairfechan, Llanfairfechan
  - Afon Dulas, Llanddulas
  - Afon Colwyn, Old Colwyn

=== Aber catchment ===
- Afon Aber
  - Afon Anafon (Rs)
  - Afon Rhaeadr Fawr (Ls)
    - Afon Rhaeadr Bach (Ls)
      - Afon Gam (L)
    - Afon Goch (Rs)

=== Ogwen catchment ===
- Afon Ogwen
  - Afon Caseg (R)
    - Afon Llafar (L)
    - Afon Denau (flows into Llyn Ogwen)
      - Nant Gwern y Gof (L)
    - Afon Lloer (flows into Llyn Ogwen)

=== Cegin catchment ===
- River Cegin (Afon Cegin)

=== Adda catchment ===
- River Adda (Afon Adda)

== Isle of Anglesey rivers ==
Anticlockwise from Menai Bridge / Porthaethwy

=== Minor coastal catchments ===
- Afon Cadnant (River Cadnant)
- Nant Meigan
- Lleiniog
- Afon Nodwydd
- Afon y Marchogion
- Afon Lligwy
- Nant Perfedd
- Afon Goch (Dulas)
- Nant y Beddyw
- Afon Bryn Gwyn
- Afon Goch (Amlwch)
- Afon Wygyr
- Gwter Fudr
- Afon Alaw (River Alaw)

=== Crigyll catchment ===
- Afon Crigyll
  - Afon Caradog (L)

=== Ffraw catchment ===
- Afon Ffraw
  - Afon Frechwen (L)
  - Afon Gwna (flows into Llyn Coron)

=== Cefni catchment ===
- Afon Cefni (River Cefni)
  - Afon Newydd (L)
  - Afon Ceint (L)
  - Afon Erddreiniog (L) (flows into Cefni Reservoir)

=== Braint (i) catchment ===
The Afon Braint bifurcates near Llanfairpwllgwyngyll to form two different watercourses.

- Afon Braint (River Braint, Dwyran)
  - Afon Rhyd y Valley (L)

=== Braint (ii) catchment ===
- Afon Braint (LlanfairPG)
  - Afon Rhyd Eilian (L)

Note: "Afon Menai", known as the "Menai Strait" in English, is not a river, despite its Welsh name. (It is more usually known in Welsh as simply "Y Fenai".)

== Mainland rivers flowing into the Menai Strait and Caernarfon Bay ==
From Bangor Pier to the tip of the Llŷn Peninsula

=== Seiont catchment ===
- Afon Seiont (River Seiont) (known as Afon Rhythallt above Pont-Rhythallt)
  - Afon Nant Peris (flows into Llyn Peris)
    - Afon Arddu (L)

=== Gwyrfai catchment ===
- Afon Gwyrfai
  - Afon Carrog (L)
    - Afon Rhŷd (R)

=== Simple coastal catchments ===
- Afon Llifon
- Afon Llyfni, Lleyn
- Afon Desach
- Afon Hen
- Nant Gwrtheyrn
- Afon Geirch
- Afon Amwlch
- Afon Pen-y-graig

== Rivers flowing into Cardigan Bay ==
From the tip of the Llŷn Peninsula to St. David's Head

- Afon Saint

=== Daron catchment ===
- Afon Daron
  - Afon Cyllyfelin (R)

=== Soch catchment ===
- Afon Soch
  - Afon Horon (L)

=== Rhyd-hir catchment etc ===
- Afon Rhyd-hir
  - Afon Penrhos (R)
- Afon Erch
- Afon Wen

=== Dwyfor catchment ===
- Afon Dwyfor
  - Afon Dwyfach (R)
  - Afon Henwy (L)

=== Glaslyn catchment ===
- Afon Glaslyn
  - Afon Dylif
    - Afon Croesor (L)
  - Nantmor (L)
  - Afon Colwyn (R)
  - Afon Llynedno (L)
- Afon Dwyryd (Headwaters are disputed to be the Afon Goedol)
  - Afon y Glyn (L)
  - Afon Prysor (L)
  - Afon Cynfal (L)
  - Afon Teigl (L)
  - Afon Bowydd
  - Afon Tafarn Helyg

=== Artro catchment ===
- Afon Artro
  - Afon Cwmnantcol (L)

=== Ysgethin catchment ===
- Afon Ysgethin

=== Mawddach catchment ===
- Afon Mawddach
  - Afon Dwynant (R)
  - Afon Gwynant (L)
  - Afon Cwm-llechen (R)
  - Afon Cwm-mynach (R)
  - Afon Wnion (L)
    - Afon Clywedog (L)
    - Afon Celynog (L)
  - Afon Wen (L)
  - Afon Gamlan (R)
  - Afon Eden (R)
    - Afon Crawcwellt (R)
  - Afon Gain (R)

=== Dysynni catchment ===
- Afon Dysynni (R)
  - Nant Cynfal (L)
  - Afon Fathew (L)
    - Nant Rhyd-yr-onen (L)
    - Afon Cwm-Pandy (L)
    - Nant Dôl-Goch (L)
  - Afon Cadair (R)
  - Nant Gwernol (L)

=== Dyffryn Gwyn catchment ===
- Afon Dyffryn Gwyn

=== Dyfi catchment ===
- River Dyfi (River Dovey)
  - Afon Ceirig
  - Afon Leri (L)
    - Afon Ceulan (R)
  - Afon Einion (L)
  - Afon Llyfnant (L)
  - Afon Dulas (R) (North Dulas)
    - Afon Deri (R)
    - Nant Ceiswyn (R)
  - Afon Dulas (L) (South Dulas)
  - Afon Twymyn (L)
    - Afon Rhiwsaeson (R)
      - Afon Laen (L)
  - Afon Angell (R)
  - Afon Cleifion (L)
    - Afon Dugoed (Rs)
    - Afon Tafolog (Ls)
  - Afon Cerist (R)
  - Afon Cywarch (R)

=== Clarach catchment ===
- Afon Clarach (formed at the confluence of Afon Stewi and Nant Silo)
  - Bowstreet Brook (R)
  - Afon Peithyll (Ls)

=== Rheidol catchment ===
- River Rheidol (Afon Rheidol)
  - Afon Melindwr (R)
  - River Mynach (L) (Afon Mynach)
    - Afon Merin (Rs)
    - Nant Rhuddnant (Ls)
  - Afon Castell (L)
  - Afon Llechwedd Mawr (flows into Nant y Moch Reservoir)
    - Afon Lluestgota (R)
  - Afon Hengwm (flows into Nant y Moch Reservoir)
    - Afon Hyddgen (R)
  - Nant-y-moch (stream flowing into Nant-y-moch Reservoir)

=== Ystwyth catchment ===
- River Ystwyth (Afon Ystwyth)
  - Afon Fâd (L)
  - Afon Llanfihangel (R)
    - Nant Cynon (Ls)
  - Afon Magwr (R)
  - Nant Freuo (L)
  - Nant Pant-yr-Haidd (R)
  - Nant Cwmtarw (L)
    - Nant Cwm-nel (L)
  - Nant Cilmeddu (L)
  - Nant y Henfelin (L)
    - Nant yr Brithyll (R)
  - Nant y Berws (L)
  - Nant Cell (R)
  - Nant Lledwenau (R)
  - Nant Bwlchgwallter (L)
  - Nant Peiran (R)
    - Nant Crafanglach (R)
    - Nant Perfedd (L)
    - Nant Ffrin-fawr (Rs)
      - Nant Hylles (L)
  - Nant Gau (L)
    - Nant Ffrwd-ddu (L)
  - Nant Cae-glas (R)
    - Nant y Gwndwn-gwyn (Ls)
    - Nant Cwta (Rs)
  - Nant Milwyn (L)
  - Nant Byr (L)
  - Nant y Gwaith (R)
  - Nant Watcyn (R)
  - Nant yr Onnen (R)
  - Nant Cwm-du (L)
  - Nant Stwc (R)
  - Nant Penygwndwn (L)
  - Nant Garw (R)
  - Nant y Cae Isaf (L)
  - Nant y Cae (L)
  - Nant Troedyrhiw (R)
  - Afon Diliw (R)
    - Nant yr Gafod (R)
    - Diliw Fechan (R)
    - Nant y Caseg (L)
    - Nant yr Eglwys
      - Nant yr Eglwys-fach (L)
    - Nant Lwyd (R)
    - Nant y Gorlan (Rs)
    - Nant Llychese (R)
  - Nant Rhydyfelin (L)
  - Nant Ffos-casaf (L)

=== Wyre catchment ===
- Afon Wyre
  - Afon Carrog (R)
  - Wyre Fach (L)
    - Nant Rhydrosser (L)
    - Afon Tryal (L)
  - Afon Beidog (L)

=== Cledan catchment ===
- Afon Cledan

=== Arth catchment ===
- River Arth

=== Aeron catchment ===
- Afon Aeron
  - Afon Mydr (L)
  - Gwenffrwd (R)

=== Coastal streams ===
- Afon Drywi
- Afon Soden
- Afon Fynnon Ddewi
- Nant Hawen
- Hoffnant

=== Teifi catchment ===
- River Teifi (Afon Teifi)
  - Afon Piliau (L)
  - Nant Arberth (R)
  - Afon Cych (L)
    - Afon Dulas (L)
    - Afon Pedran (L)
    - Afon Sylgen (R)
  - Afon Hirwaun (R)
  - Nant Elfed (R)
  - Afon Ceri (R)
    - Afon Dulas (Lampeter) (R)
    - Afon Bedw (L)
  - Nant Bargod (L)
  - Afon Tyweli (L)
    - Afon Talog (R)
  - Afon Clettwr (P)
    - Clettwr Fawr (Rs)
    - Clettwr Fach (Ls)
  - Nant Cledlyn (R)
  - Afon Duar (L)
  - Afon Granell (R)
  - Afon Dulas (Llandyssul) (R)
    - Afon Denys (R)
  - Nant Clywedog (L)
    - Clywedog-isaf (Ls)
    - Clywedog-ganol (Rs)
      - Clywedog-uchaf (R)
  - Afon Brefi (L)
  - Nant Bryn-maen (R)
  - Afon Berwyn (L)
    - Afon Groes (R)
  - Afon Fflur (L)
  - Camddwr (R)
  - Afon Meurig (R)
  - Nant Lluest (R)
  - Glasffrwd (L)
  - Nant Egnant (L)
  - Nant Rhydol (R)

=== Nevern catchment etc ===
- River Nevern
  - Nant Duad (R)
  - Afon Brynberian (L)
  - Afon Bannon (L)

=== Minor coastal catchments ===
- River Gwaun (Afon Gwaun)
  - River Aer (L)

== Rivers flowing to west Pembrokeshire coast ==
From St David's Head to St. Govan's Head

=== Minor catchments ===
- River Alun
- River Solva (Afon Solfach)
- Brandy Brook

=== Cleddau catchment ===
- Daugleddau (estuary is Daugleddyf or Milford Haven downstream)
  - Pembroke River (L)
  - Carew River (L)
  - Cresswell River (L)
  - Western Cleddau (Rs)
    - Millin Brook (L)
    - Merlin's Brook (R)
    - Cartlett Brook (L)
    - Knock Brook (R)
      - Camrose Brook (R)
    - Rudbaxton Water (L)
    - Spittal Brook (L)
    - Nant-y-coy Brook (R)
    - Afon Anghof (L)
      - Afon Glan-rhyd (R)
    - Nant y Bugail (L)
    - Afon Cleddau (upper reaches of Western Cleddau)
  - Eastern Cleddau (Ls)
    - Afon Syfynwy (R)
    - Afon Wern (R)

== Rivers flowing into the Bristol Channel ==
From St. Govan's Head to M48 Bridge

=== South Pembrokeshire rivers ===
- The Ritec (Afon Rhydeg}

=== Taf catchment ===
- River Tâf (Afon Taf)
  - River Cywyn (Afon Cywyn) (L)
  - Afon Cynin (L)
    - Afon Dewi Fawr (L)
    - Afon Sien (R)
  - Afon Fenni (R)
  - Afon Gronw (L)
  - Afon Marlais (R)

=== Towy catchment ===
- Afon Tywi (River Towy)
  - Afon Gwili (R)
  - Afon Annell (R)
  - River Cothi (R) (Afon Cothi)
    - Afon Gorlech (R)
    - Afon Twrch (R)
    - Afon Marlais (R)
  - Afon Dulas (R)
  - Afon Cennen (L)
  - Afon Sawdde (L)
  - Afon Bran (L)
    - Afon Ydw (R)
  - Afon Dulais (R)
  - Afon Brân (L)
    - Cynnant Fawr (Rs)
      - Cynnant Fach (L)
    - Afon Lwynor (Ls)
    - Afon Crychan (L)
    - Afon Gwydderig (L)
  - Afon Gwenlais (R)
  - Gwenffrwd (R)
    - Nant Melyn (R)
  - Afon Doethie (R)
    - Afon Pysgotwr Fawr (R)
      - Afon Pysgotwr Fach (R)
  - Camddwr (R)

=== Gwendraeth catchment ===
- River Gwendraeth
  - Gwendraeth Fach (Rs)
  - Gwendraeth Fawr (Ls)

=== Lliedi catchment ===
- River Lliedi (Afon Lliedi)

=== Loughor catchment ===
- River Loughor (Afon Llwchwr)
  - Burry Pill (L)
  - Afon Lliw (L)
    - Afon Llan (L)
  - Afon Gwili (R)
  - River Amman (L)
  - Afon Lash (R)
  - Afon Morlais (R)
  - Afon Dulais
  - Afon Camffrwd

=== Clyne catchment ===
- Clyne River

=== Tawe catchment ===
- River Tawe
  - Nant-y-fendrod (L)
  - Lower Clydach River (R)
  - Upper Clydach River (R)
    - River Egel (L)
  - Afon Twrch (R)
    - Nant Gwys (L)
      - Gwys Fawr (Ls)
      - Gwys Fach (Rs)
    - Nant Llynfell (R)
    - Nant y Llyn (R)
  - River Giedd (R)
    - Nant Cyw (L)
    - Nant Ceiliog (L)
  - Nant Llech (L)
    - Nant Llech Pellaf (L)
  - River Haffes (R)
  - Nant Byfre (L)
  - Nant y Llyn (R)

=== Neath catchment ===
- River Neath
  - River Clydach (R)
  - River Dulais (R)
  - Melin Cwrt Brook (L)
  - Clydach Brook (L)
  - Nedd Fechan (Rs)
    - Afon Pyrddin (R)
  - Afon Mellte (Ls)
    - Sychryd(L)
    - Afon Hepste (L)
    - Afon Llia (Rs)
    - Afon Dringarth (Ls)

=== Afan catchment ===
- River Afan
  - Ffrwd Wyllt (L)
  - Nant Cwm Wenderi
  - Afon Pelenna (R)
  - Nant Cregan
  - Afon Corrwg (R)
    - Afon Corrwg Fechan (R)

=== Kenfig catchment ===
- River Kenfig (Afon Cynffig)

=== Ogmore catchment ===
- River Ogmore (Afon Ogwr)
  - River Ewenny (L)
    - Afon Alun (L)
    - Afon Ewenny Fach (L)
    - Nant Canna (L)
    - Nant Crymlyn (R)
  - River Llynfi (R)
    - Nant y Gadlys (R)
    - Nant Cwm-du (L)
  - Afon Garw (R)
  - Afon Ogwr Fawr (Rs)
  - Afon Ogwr Fach (Ls)
    - Nant Iechyd (R)

=== Col-huw catchment ===
- Afon Col-huw
  - Ogney Brook (Rs)
  - Hoddnant (Ls)
    - Boverton Brook (Ls)
    - Llanmaes Brook (Rs)

=== Thaw catchment ===
- River Thaw
  - Kenson River (L)
    - River Waycock (Ls)
    - Nant Llancarfan (Rs)
  - Nant y Stepsau (R)

=== Cadoxton catchment ===
- Cadoxton River
  - Sully Brook (L)
  - Cold Brook, Cadoxton (R)
    - Nant yr Argae (L)
  - East Brook, Cadoxton (L)
  - Bullcroft Brook (Ls)
  - Wrinstone Brook (Rs)

=== Taff catchment ===
- River Taff (Afon Taf)
  - River Ely (Afon Elái) (R)
    - Afon Clun (L) (Nant Myddlyn in upper reaches)
  - River Rhondda (R) (Afon Rhondda)
    - Rhondda Fawr (Ls)
    - Rhondda Fach (Rs)
    - River Ritec (Afon Ritec)
  - Nant Clydach (R)
  - River Cynon (R) (Afon Cynon)
    - Aman River
    - Afon Dar
    - Afon Pennar
  - Bargoed Taf (L)
  - Nant Morlais
  - Taf Fechan (Ls)
  - Nant Ffrwd (Rs)

=== Rhymney catchment ===
- Rhymney River (Afon Rhymni)
  - Nant Bargod Rhymni (R)

=== Usk catchment ===
- River Usk (Afon Wysg)
  - Ebbw River (R) (Afon Ebwy)
    - Sirhowy River (R)
    - River Ebbw Fach (L)
  - Afon Llwyd (R)
  - Sôr Brook (R)
  - Olway Brook (L)
  - Berthin Brook (R)
  - Afon Gafenni (L) (River Gavenny)
    - Afon Cibi (R)
  - River Clydach (R)
  - Grwyne Fawr (L)
    - Grwyne Fechan (R)
  - Rhiangoll (L)
  - Nant Cleisfer (R)
  - Afon Crawnon (R)
  - Caerfanell (R)
  - Nant Menasgin (R)
  - Afon Cynrig (R)
  - River Honddu (L)
  - Afon Tarell (R)
    - Nant Cwm Llwch
  - Afon Ysgir (L)
  - Nant Brân (L)
  - Afon Cilieni (L)
  - Afon Senni (R)
  - Afon Crai (R)
  - Afon Hydfer (R)

=== Wye catchment ===
- River Wye (Afon Gwy)
  - River Trothy (R)
  - River Monnow (Afon Mynwy) (R)
    - River Dore (L)
      - Dulas Brook (R)
      - Worm Brook (L)
    - River Honddu (R)
    - Olchon Brook (R)
    - Escley Brook (L)
  - River Lugg (L) (Afon Llugwy)
    - River Frome (L)
    - River Kenwater
    - River Arrow (R)
      - Cynon Brook
        - Gilwern Brook
      - Gladestry Brook
  - Dulas Brook (R)
  - Afon Llynfi (R)
    - River Ennig (R)
    - Dulas (L)
      - Triffrwd (L)
  - Bachawy (L)
  - Afon Edw (L)
  - Duhonw (R)
  - Afon Irfon (R)
    - Afon Chwerfri (L)
    - Dulas (L)
    - Afon Cammarch (L)
    - Afon Dulas (R)
    - Afon Gwesyn (L)
  - Dulas Brook (L)
  - River Ithon (L) (Afon Ieithon)
    - Dulas (R)
    - Clywedog Brook (R)
    - Afon Aran (L)
    - Camddwr (L)
  - Afon Elan (R)
    - Afon Claerwen (R)
      - Rhiwnant (R)
      - Afon Arban (R)
      - Afon Claerddu (R)
    - Afon Gwngu (R)
  - Afon Marteg (L)
  - Afon Bidno (L)
  - Afon Tarennig (R)

=== Severn catchment ===
With the exception of the uppermost Teme and a small part of the Rea Brook, all tributaries of the Severn downstream of the confluence of the Severn and the Vyrnwy are wholly in England. For details see List of rivers of England.

- River Severn (Afon Hafren), Bristol Channel (Môr Hafren)
  - River Teme (R) (Afon Tefeidiad) (all but uppermost section in England)
  - Rea Brook (R) (small parts of upper catchment in Wales)
  - River Vyrnwy (L) (Afon Efyrnwy) (lowermost section in England)
    - Afon Tanat (L) (lowermost section in England)
      - Cynllaith (L) (part forms the border between Wales and England)
        - Afon Ogau
      - Afon Iwrch (L)
      - Afon Rhaeadr (L)
      - Afon Eirth (L)
    - Afon Cain (L)
      - Nant Fyllon (Ls)
      - Nant Alan (Rs)
    - Afon Banwy (R) (a.k.a. Afon Einion)
      - Afon Einion (R)
      - Afon Gam (R)
      - Afon Twrch (L)
  - Maerdy Brook (L)
  - New Cut/Guilsfield Brook (L)
  - Luggy Brook (L)
  - Camlad (R) (partly in England)
  - River Rhiw (Afon Rhiw) (L)
    - Afon Rhiw (north fork) (Rs)
    - Afon Rhiw (south fork)(Ls)
  - Llifior Brook (L)
  - The Mule (R) (Afon Miwl)
  - Bechan Brook (L)
  - Mochdre Brook (R)
  - Nant Rhyd-ros lan??
  - Afon Carno (L)
    - Afon Cerniog (R)
    - Afon Cledan (R)
  - Afon Trannon (L)
    - Afon Cerist (R)
      - Colwyn Brook (L)
  - Nant Feinion (R)
  - Wigdwr Brook (L)
  - Afon Clywedog (L)
    - Afon Biga (R) (flows into Clywedog Reservoir)
    - Afon Llwyd (R) (flows into Clywedog Reservoir)
  - Afon Dulas (R)
    - Afon Brochan (L)
    - Nant Cydros (R)
    - Rhydyclwydau Brook (R)

== Longest rivers in Wales ==
This is a table of the longest rivers wholly or partially in Wales. Rivers only partly in Wales are included in this table in italics. Note that river lengths given by different authorities vary due to the different ways in which the measurement is made or indeed estimated. That rivers are partly fractal in nature accounts for some variation and lengths can also vary slightly over time as meanders expand or are cut off where rivers run through broad flood-plains.

	River	Length		Notes
	River	(miles)	(km)	Notes
1	River Severn	220	354	Longest river in the United Kingdom; leaves Wales after 48 miles (77 km).
2	River Wye	135	217	Forms the Wales-England border for much of its length.
3	River Teme	81	130	Entirely in England after 12 miles (19 km).
4	River Usk	78	126	Longest river entirely in Wales according to some sources.
5	River Tywi	75	121	
6	River Teifi	73	117	
7	River Dee	70	113	
8	River Taff	40	64	

== See also ==
- List of rivers of the United Kingdom
- List of rivers of England
- List of rivers in Ireland
- List of rivers of the Isle of Man
- List of rivers in Scotland
- Longest rivers of the United Kingdom
- Main river
