= Mynydd Mallaen =

Hill plateau in Carmarthenshire, Wales

Coordinates: 52.08°N 3.84°W

Mynydd Mallaen/Crugiau Merched

Highest point
- Elevation: 462 m (1,516 ft)
- Prominence: 205 m (673 ft)
- Listing: Marilyn

Geography
- Location: Carmarthenshire
- Parent range: Cambrian Mountains

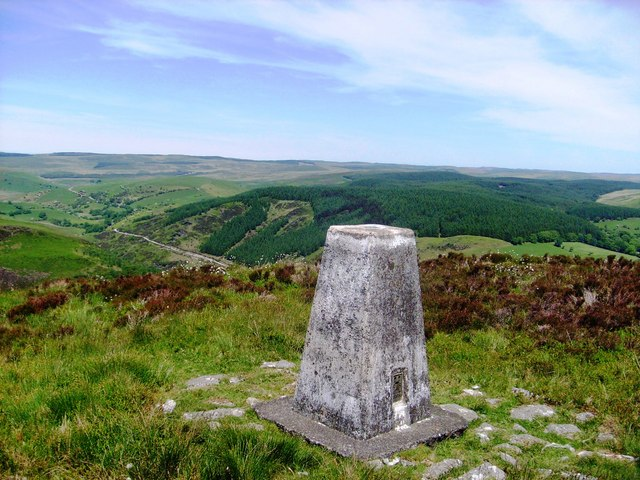
View of Crugiau Merched trig point and Cefn Branddu

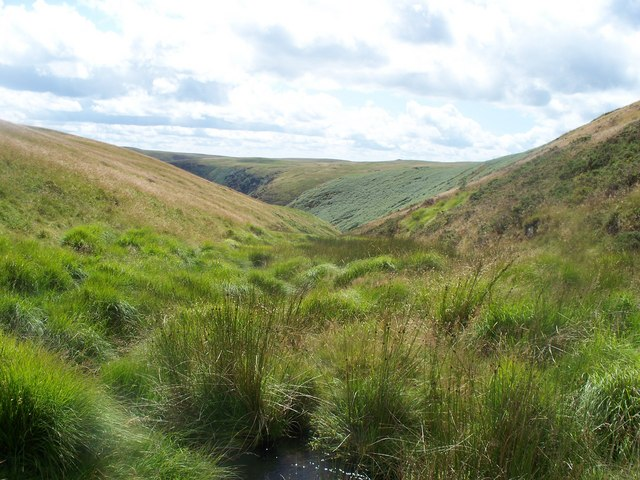
Head of a valley on Mynydd Mallaen

Mynydd Mallaen (Welsh: [ˈmənɨð ˈmaɬai̯n]) is an expansive plateau to the northwest of Cilycwm in northeast Carmarthenshire, Wales. It forms part of the Cambrian Mountains massif, and is north-west of the Black Mountain (range) in the Brecon Beacons. It takes the form of an undulating plateau with steep slopes dropping away to the Towy valley to the east and those of the Gwenffrwd, Nant Melyn and Afon Cothi to the north and west. Its highest point of 1516 feet or 462m at OS grid reference SN 723455 is surmounted by two Bronze Age cairns known as Crugiau Merched (which translates from Welsh as ladies' barrows). Caeo Forest covers much of the southern flanks of the hill and smaller forests also cover its eastern slopes. Much of the native woodland consists of sessile oak groves, especially on the valley sides. The human population is very low, being restricted to hill farms engaged in sheep farming, and some holiday cottages.

== Geology ==
The geology of Mynydd Mallaen is complex, comprising mudstones of the Claerwen Group together with sandstones of the Doethie and Glanyrafon Formations and the Caerau Mudstones Formation. Each of these Silurian rock formations is folded and faulted. Indeed it is an outcrop of conglomerate turbidite rock on the western limb of the Cothi Anticline which forms the summit of the hill. Glacial till and boulder clay from the last ice age occupies some of the hollows on the plateau, and there are many stones and boulders of white quartz scattered across the plateau, perhaps the remains of mineral veins eroded away.

== Archaeology ==
In addition to several round barrows, there are many standing stones on the plateau, two being very near to Cregiau Merched; one is named as Maen Bach.

Gold mining occurs on the south-eastern flank of the plateau, and was pioneered in the Roman period as soon as the area had been conquered ca 75 AD. The remains are visible at Dolaucothi and traces of the Roman aqueducts can be seen on the neighbouring parts of the mountain. They tap both the River Cothi and Afon Twrch, Carmarthenshire. The earlier earthen aqueduct shows several channels above the minehead, and tapped local springs. The channels led to water tanks above a single opencast near to Pumpsaint on the south western flank of the plateau. A larger one tapped the Twrch higher up the valley. The Cothi aqueduct tapped the larger river about 7 miles upstream, and fed a large reservoir at the minehead. Such tanks were used in hushing, a method of removing surface debris to find gold veins in the bedrock. They were also used for washing gold-bearing sand or other deposits, a form of placer mining or hydraulic mining, as well washing crushed ore on special gold washing tables. From dating evidence at Melin-y-Milwyr, a small reservoir above the minehead and the large Roman fort under Pumpsaint village, mining tailed off after 150 AD although some presence continued till circa 350 AD.

There was also a very large lead mine nearby to the north of the plateau at Rhandirmwyn which was one of the largest in the world in the 1750s. There is also some evidence of earlier mining on a smaller scale at the head of the mine, at the outcrop of Pencerrig mwyn which may also be of Roman origin.

== Wildlife ==
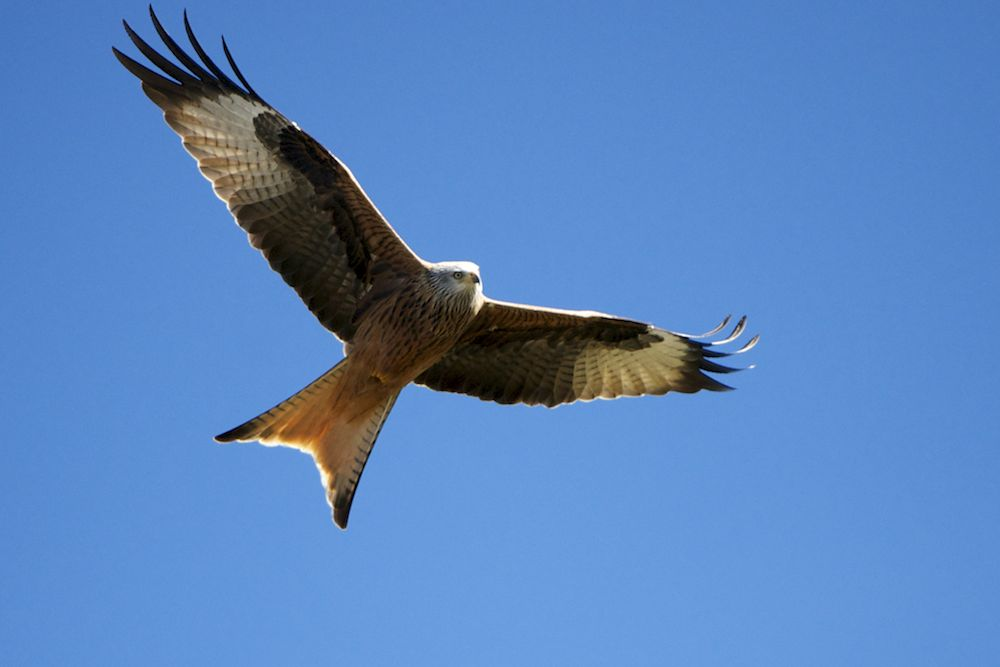
Red kite in flight in Gredos Mountains, Avila, Spain

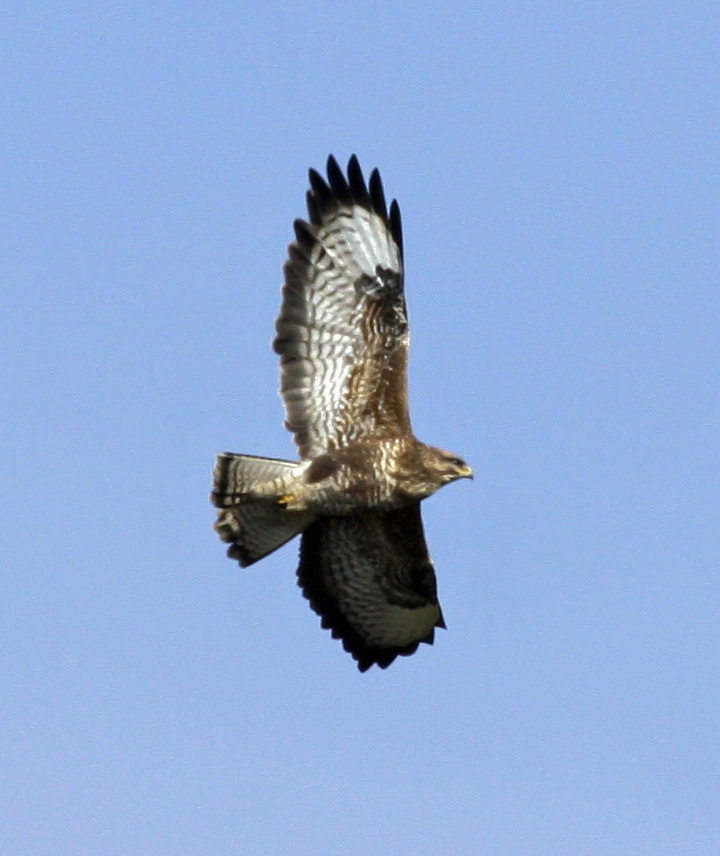
Common Buzzard in flight, Devon, England. There are around 40,000 breeding pairs in the United Kingdom

There are numerous bird species present in the area, including large birds of preys like the red kite, common buzzard, raven, kestrel and carrion crow, as well as songbirds such as the skylark, among many others. The red kite retreated to this area after intense persecution by gamekeepers in the rest of the country. There are foxes and badgers especially in the woods and forests, and the local rivers are well stocked with salmon, trout and sewin. There is a wide distribution of mammals such as field voles and rabbits as well as many songbirds. The skylark is plentiful due to the extensive rough pasture present below the main peaks which allows ground nesting of the species. Pied wagtails are common near the streams and torrents running from the hill tops. The numerous sessile oak groves along the sheltered hillsides host the common bluebell in the spring, as well as offering sanctuary to wildlife.

== Access ==
The entire hill is mapped as open country under the Countryside and Rights of Way Act 2000 so is freely available to those on foot. Additionally there is a bridleway which crosses the hill in an east-west direction and a further one approaching from the south. Large parts of the plateau is peat bog and wet underfoot, so care is needed in walking the top in the absence of clear footpaths. Apart from the two standing stones and large cairns, there are few obvious landmarks.

== See also ==
- Mynydd Epynt
