= Aber, Powys =

Hamlet in Powys, Wales

Coordinates: 51.883261°N 3.300331°W

Aber: Aber Village; Aberclydach (Welsh)
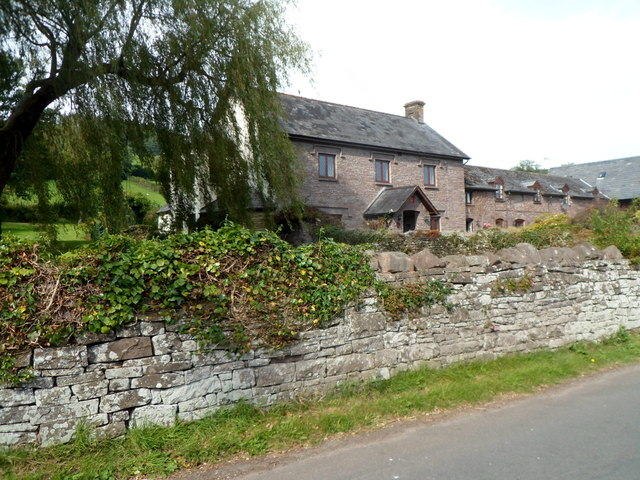

- Location within Powys
- OS grid reference: SO 106 213
  - Cardiff: 28 mi (45 km)
  - London: 138 mi (222 km)
- Community: Talybont-on-Usk
- Principal area: Powys
- Country: Wales
- Sovereign state: United Kingdom
- Post town: BRECON
- Postcode district: LD3
- Police: Dyfed-Powys
- Fire: Mid and West Wales
- Ambulance: Welsh
- UK Parliament: Brecon, Radnor and Cwm Tawe
- Senedd Cymru – Welsh Parliament: Brecon and Radnorshire

Aber, also known as Aber Village or the Welsh name Aberclydach (or Aber Clydach), is a hamlet within the Brecon Beacons National Park in Powys, Wales. It is centred on the confluence between the Clydach brook meets the Caerfanell river, and on a minor road which runs south from Talybont-on-Usk. It is located in part of Caerfanell valley known as Glyn Collwn, which spans across the Brecon Beacons to Pontsticill and Merthyr Tydfil. Aber lies within the community of Talybont-on-Usk about 1.5 km to the south of the village of Talybont and 0.5 km to the north of the dam of Talybont Reservoir.

Both the Usk Valley Walk and the Taff Trail pass close to the village. The Danywenallt Study Centre administered by the Brecon Beacons National Park Authority in association with the Youth Hostels Association lies across the valley from the village.

== Notable residents ==
- Alice Matilda Langland Williams (1867–1950), Welsh writer
- William Retlaw Williams (1863–1944), Welsh writer
