= List of rivers of England and Wales =

List of rivers of England and Wales may refer to one of:

- List of rivers of England
- List of rivers of Wales
