= List of shipwrecks in September 1880 =

The list of shipwrecks in September 1880 includes ships sunk, foundered, grounded, or otherwise lost during September 1880.

== 1 September ==
List of shipwrecks: 1 September 1880
Ship	State	Description
Adele	Germany	The steamship caught fire off Rixhöft. All on board were rescued. She was on a voyage from Königsberg and/or Pillau to Kiel.
Adolf Andersohn	Norway	The barque collided with RMS Deccan (United Kingdom) and sank in the English Channel off Start Point, Devon, United Kingdom. Her crew were rescued by RMS Deccan.
Ann	United Kingdom	The sloop ran aground at Beadnell, Northumberland. She was on a voyage from Beadnell to Leith, Lothian. She was refloated and resumed her voyage, but sprang a leak the next day. She was towed in to Berwick upon Tweed for repairs.
Bay of Naples	United Kingdom	The ship ran aground in the Rangoon River. She was on a voyage from Liverpool, Lancashire to Rangoon, Burma. She was refloated.
Broomhaugh	United Kingdom	The steamship was wrecked on Ouessant, Finistère, France. Her crew were rescued. She was on a voyage from Taganrog, Russia to London.
Creole	United Kingdom	The schooner heeled over and sank at Cardiff, Glamorgan.
Flying Scud	United Kingdom	The barque was driven ashore and wrecked at Port Elizabeth, Cape Colony with the loss of five of her crew. She was on a voyage from Vizagapatam, India to London.
George Louise	United Kingdom	The fishing boat was driven ashore at Great Yarmouth, Norfolk. She was refloated and resumed her voyage.
George Moore	United Kingdom	The steamship was driven ashore on Öland, Sweden. She was on a voyage from Ventava, Courland Governorate to Dublin. She was refloated and resumed her voyage.
Hardwick	United Kingdom	The steamship foundered in the Mediterranean Sea 35 nautical miles (65 km) east of Gibraltar with the loss of eighteen of her nineteen crew. The survivor was rescued by Carmen Juanito (Spain). Hardwick was on a voyage from Odesa, Russia to Bristol, Gloucestershire.
Redesdale	United Kingdom	The steamship ran aground in the Sulina branch of the Danube at Gorgova, United Principalities. She was on a voyage from Newcastle upon Tyne, Northumberland to Brăila, United Principalities.
Unnamed	United Kingdom	A lighter sank at Cardiff with the loss of one life.

== 2 September ==
List of shipwrecks: 2 September 1880
Ship	State	Description
Lara	United Kingdom	The steamship ran aground on the Dungannon Shoals, off Waterford. She was on a voyage from Liverpool, Lancashire to Waterford.
Mead	United Kingdom	The brig sprang a severe leak. She was subsequently towed in to the River Tyne in a waterlogged condition.
P. F.	France	The fishing vessel ran aground on the Newcombe Sand, in the North Sea off the coast of Suffolk, United Kingdom. She was refloated with assistance and taken in to Lowestoft, Suffolk.
Snow Queen	United Kingdom	The ship ran aground at the Twin Islands, at Belfast, County Antrim.
Thessalia	Greece	The brig was driven ashore and capsized at Barry, Glamorgan, United Kingdom. Her crew were rescued. She was on a voyage from Cardiff, Glamorgan to Constantinople, Ottoman Empire.

== 3 September ==
List of shipwrecks: 3 September 1880
Ship	State	Description
Annie Smith	United Kingdom	The steamship ran aground in the River Tees and was severely damaged. She was refloated and taken in to Middlesbrough, Yorkshire.
Dragon	United Kingdom	The steamship collided with the steamship Sumatra (United Kingdom) and sank off the Owers Sandbank, in the English Channel. Her twenty crew were rescued by Sumatra. Dragon was on a voyage from London to the Charente.
Grand Casimir	France	The yacht was wrecked at Roscoff, Finistère with the loss of four of the eight people on board.
Luna	Germany	The schooner was driven ashore and wrecked at Durban, Natal Colony.
Silurian	United Kingdom	The steamship ran ashore between Hartland Point and Clovelly, Devon and was wrecked. Her crew of 21 were rescued. She was on a voyage from Salonica, Ottoman Empire to Cardiff, Glamorgan.
Sorata	United Kingdom	The steamship ran aground 3 nautical miles (5.6 km) off Cape Jervis, South Australia. Her passengers were taken off by the steamship Woonata (South Australia). They were reboarded the next day but were taken off on 5 September by Victorian (Victoria). Sorata was on a voyage from Plymouth, Devon to Adelaide, South Australia and Melbourne, Victoria.
Unnamed	France	A lugger ran aground on the Holme Sand, in the North Sea off the coast of Suffolk, United Kingdom. She was refloated and resumed her voyage.

== 4 September ==
List of shipwrecks: 4 September 1880
Ship	State	Description
Arthos	United Kingdom	The ship ran aground at Honfleur, Manche, France. She was on a voyage from Egypt to Honfleur.
Florence	United Kingdom	The steamship ran aground at Sunderland, County Durham.
Frankfort	United Kingdom	The steamship struck a rock and sank 3 nautical miles (5.6 km) off the Skerryvore Lighthouse. All seventeen people on board reached the lighthouse, from where they were rescued. She was on a voyage from Liverpool, Lancashire to Stockholm, Sweden.
Loleta	United States	The schooner was wrecked in fog on St. Lawrence Island in the Bering Sea. Her sixteen crew survived.
Strathmore	United Kingdom	The East Indiaman, a barque, was abandoned off the Cape of Good Hope, Cape Colony. Her fifteen crew were rescued. She sank off Dyer's Point. She was on a voyage from Cocanada, India to London.
Wasp	United Kingdom	The steam lighter was wrecked at Grande-Basse, Ivory Coast.
Unnamed	United Kingdom	A steamship ran aground at Craig, Angus. She was refloated.

== 5 September ==
List of shipwrecks: 5 September 1880
Ship	State	Description
Charleston	United States	The steamship was driven ashore at Charleston, South Carolina. She was on a voyage from Charleston to New York.
John	United Kingdom	The ship departed from "Paskalaivik" for Leith, Lothian. No further trace, reported overdue.

== 6 September ==
List of shipwrecks: 6 September 1880
Ship	State	Description
Anglia	United Kingdom	The steamship collided with the barque Trongate (United Kingdom) and sank in the Grand Banks of Newfoundland. Her 50 crew were rescued. Anglia was on a voyage from Boston, Massachusetts, United States to London.
Bates Family	United Kingdom	The full-rigged ship was abandoned in the Indian Ocean off Cape Agulhas, Cape Colony (39°30′S 23°30′E). Her crew were rescued by British India (United Kingdom). Bates Family was on a voyage from Gopaulpore, India to London.
Hannah Morris	Canada	The ship departed from Liverpool, Lancashire, United Kingdom for Philadelphia, Pennsylvania, United States. No further trace, presumed foundered with the loss of all sixteen crew.
Hilda	United Kingdom	The brig was wrecked on the Molasses Reef, off the Caicos Islands. She was on a voyage from Cap-Haïtien, Haiti to the English Channel.
Let Me Alone	United Kingdom	The schooner struck the pier at Gourdon, Aberdeenshire and was damaged. She was on a voyage from Grimsby, Lincolnshire to Gourdon.
Ortive	United Kingdom	The barque was run down and sunk in the River Thames by the steamship Milo (United Kingdom)/ All on board were rescued by Milo. Ortive was on a voyage from London to Blyth, Northumberland.
Sorata	United Kingdom	Reported as a probable total wreck off South Australia. The crew, passengers and cargo were saved and much of the ship would probably be salvaged. The vessel went into dry dock at Melbourne.
Unnamed	France	A schooner was run down and sunk off the Bass Rock, Lothian, United Kingdom by the steamship Sir Walter (United Kingdom) with the loss of all five crew. Part of her name was "Ville d'Antr".

== 7 September ==
List of shipwrecks: 7 September 1880
Ship	State	Description
Bickley	United Kingdom	The steamship was driven ashore 14 nautical miles (26 km) south of Ventava, Courland Governorate. She was on a voyage from Belfast, County Antrim to Riga, Russia. She had been refloated by 13 September and taken in to Ventava.
Blue Bonnet	United Kingdom	The tug collided with the quayside at Leith, Lothian and was severely damaged.
Brothers	United Kingdom	The fishing smack was run down by the fishing smack Jane Reed (United Kingdom) and sank in the North Sea. Her crew were rescued by Jane Reed.
Chambeze	United Kingdom	The steamship ran aground at Smyrna, Ottoman Empire. She was on a voyage from Liverpool, Lancashire to Smyrna. She was refloated.
Glasgow	United Kingdom	The steamship ran aground at Leven, Fife. She was on a voyage from Leven to Dunkirk, Nord, France.
Hesperus	Norway	The schooner ran aground on the L'Eclat Sandbank, in the English Channel. She was on a voyage from the Rio Grande do Sul to Havre de Grâce, Seine-Inférieure, France. She was refloated.
Mary Ann	United Kingdom	The ship ran aground and sank at Southwold, Suffolk.
Merrie Monarch	United Kingdom	The ship foundered in the Atlantic Ocean off the coast of Georgia or Florida.
Moorburg	Germany	The schooner ran aground on the Belvedere Reef, off Gaspar Island, Spanish East Indies. Her crew were rescued by the schooner Abiel Abbot (United States). Moorburg was on a voyage from Australia to Hong Kong.
Rangatira	(United Kingdom of Great Britain and Ireland) New Zealand	The steamship was wrecked on a reef near Bell Block, New Zealand, on a voyage from Manukau to New Plymouth, due to negligent navigation.
Rosina C.	Italy	The ship departed from Philadelphia, Pennsylvania, United States for Gibraltar. No further trace, reported missing.
Teocle	Italy	The barque caught fire off Naples. She was on a voyage from Naples to New York, United States. She was towed back to Naples.
Unnamed vessels	Flags unknown	At least two vessels foundered in the Atlantic Ocean off the coast of Georgia or Florida.
Unnamed	Flag unknown	A ship was driven ashore in a capsized condition 20 nautical miles (37 km) from Saint Augustine, Florida, United States.

== 8 September ==
List of shipwrecks: 8 September 1880
Ship	State	Description
Arbutus	United Kingdom	The schooner collided with the steamship Toronto (United Kingdom) in the River Mersey and was beached at New Brighton, Cheshire. Arbutus was on a voyage from Liverpool, Lancashire to Dublin.
Europe	France	The steamship caught fire at Navarino, Greece and was scuttled. She was on a voyage from Marseille, Bouches-du-Rhône to Constantinople, Ottoman Empire. She had been refloated by 15 September.
Fly	United Kingdom	The schooner was driven ashore at McCrinan's Point, Argyllshire.
Glyndwr	United Kingdom	The ship ran aground on the Cork Sand. She was on a voyage from Fredrikstad, Denmark to London. She was refloated and resumed her voyage.
Grimstad	Norway	The schooner was wrecked near Mandal. She was on a voyage from Hull, Yorkshire, United Kingdom to Arendal.
Margaret and Martha	United Kingdom	The schooner ran aground on the Swilly Platters and was beached at Caernarfon. She was on a voyuage from Port Dinorwic, Caernarfonshire to Liverpool, Lancashire.
Marie	Germany	The schooner ran aground in the Ems at "Groszenstein" and was holed.
M. A. Sophia	United Kingdom	The ship sprang a leak and foundered 12 nautical miles (22 km) south west by west of St. Ann's Head, Pembrokeshire. Her crew survived. She was on a voyage from Portmadoc, Caernarfonshire to Shoreham-by-Sea, Sussex.
Mazeppa	Norway	The ship was driven ashore at "Norgen". She was on a voyage from Blyth, Northumberland, United Kingdom to Saint Petersburg, Russia. She was refloated and taken in to Reval, Russia for repairs.
Sliveve More	United Kingdom	The ship ran aground at Chittagong, India. She was on a voyage from Chittagong to Dundee, Forfarshire. She was refloated, resuming her voyage the next day.
Three Sisters	United Kingdom	The Thames barge was run into by the steamship Holland (United Kingdom) and sank in the River Thames at Deptford, Kent. Her crew survived.
Triad	United Kingdom	The schooner struck the pier at Great Yarmouth, Norfolk and was beached at Gorleston, Suffolk. She was on a voyage from Runcorn, Cheshire to Great Yarmouth. She was refloated the next day and taken in to Great Yarmouth for repairs.
Winschoten I	Netherlands	The ship was driven ashore and wrecked at Hallshuk, Gotland, Sweden. She was on a voyage from Groningen to Skutskär, Sweden.

== 9 September ==
List of shipwrecks: 9 September 1880
Ship	State	Description
Adela	United Kingdom	The steamship caught fire off Danzig, Germany. She was on a voyage from Danzig to Boulogne, Pas-de-Calais, France.
Burmah	United Kingdom	The Mersey Flat was run into by the steamship St. Bernard, which was being launched at Liverpool, Lancashire, and became waterlogged.
Gilston	United Kingdom	The steamship collided with the steamship Bear (United Kingdom) and sank at the mouth of the River Tees. Gilston was on a voyage from Middlesbrough, Yorkshire to South Shields, County Durham.
Green Jacket	United Kingdom	The ship ran aground off Finkenwerder, Germany. She was on a voyage from Philadelphia, Pennsylvania, United States to Hamburg, Germany. She was refloated and taken in to Hamburg.
Inverness-shire	United Kingdom	The schooner foundered in the North Sea 110 nautical miles (200 km) east south east of Kinnaird Head, Aberdeenshire. Her crew were rescued by the barque Amalthea (Germany). Inverness-shire was on a voyage from Sandhaven, Aberdeenshire to Danzig, Germany.
Johanna	France	The schooner was driven asbhore at Lemvig, Denmark. She was on a voyage from Dieppe, Seine-Inférieure to Riga, Russia.
Mersey	United Kingdom	The steamship struck the pier at Greencastle, County Louth and sank. All on board were rescued. She was on a voyage from Liverpool to Wexford.
Pauline David	Belgium	The steamship was run into by the steamship Richard Anning (United Kingdom) at Constantinople, Ottoman Empire and was severely damaged.
Prince of Wales	United Kingdom	The sloop was holed by her anchor and sank at Connah's Quay, Flintshire. Her crew survived. She was on a voyage from Saltney, Cheshire to Wicklow.
Queen of Britain	United Kingdom	The brig sprang a leak and was abandoned off Strumble Head, Pembrokeshire. Her crew survived. She was on a voyage from Caernarfon to Boulogne, Pas-de-Calais, France.
S. G. Mermelin	Sweden	The steamship ran aground off Luleå and was holed. She put back to Luleå in a leaky condition.
Undecimus	Malta	The barque was destroyed by fire at Tripoli, Ottoman Tripolitania. Her crew were rescued.
Violet	United Kingdom	The yacht foundered in the Firth of Clyde 4 nautical miles (7.4 km) south of the Isle of Bute. All on board were rescued. She was on a voyage from Rothesay, Isle of Bute to Lamlash, Isle of Arran.

== 10 September ==
List of shipwrecks: 10 September 1880
Ship	State	Description
Camero	United Kingdom	The steamship ran aground in the River Thames at Dagenham, Essex. She was on a voyage from London to Christiania, Norway. She was refloated and resumed her voyage.
Cape City	United Kingdom	The ship ran aground on the Phaeton Shoal, in the Indian Ocean. She had been refloated by 13 September and had resumed her voyage.
Diamond	United Kingdom	The steamship caught fire at Danzig, Germany. She was on a voyage from Burntisland, Fife to Neufahrwassar, Germany.
Diana	United Kingdom	The schooner ran aground on the East Muck Sandbank. She was on a voyage from Rochester, Kent to Buckie, Banffshire. She was refloated and taken in to Buckie in a leaky condition.
Elsie Allen	United States	The schooner foundered in the Atlantic Ocean. She was on a voyage from the Cape Verde Islands to an American port.
Margaret	United Kingdom	The yawl was driven ashore at Scarborough, Yorkshire. She was refloated with the assistance of a steamship but ran aground again and sank.
Sonne	Germany	The schooner was driven ashore on Rügen and sank. Her crew were rescued.

== 11 September ==
List of shipwrecks: 11 September 1880
Ship	State	Description
Afghan	United Kingdom	The steamship ran aground at Jeddah, Hejaz Vilayet. She was on a voyage from London to the Persian Gulf. She was refloated.
Capri	Canada	The barque was wrecked at Munees, Uist, Outer Hebrides, United Kingdom. Her seventeen crew were rescued. She was on a voyage from Christiania, Norway to New York, United States.
Dido	United Kingdom	The steamship was driven ashore at "Vizen", Brazil and severely damaged. She was refloated and taken in to Vizen.
Durance	France	The steamship ran aground on the Calvi Rocks. She was on a voyage from Marseille, Bouches-du-Rhône to Corsica.
Eva	Sweden	The barque was wrecked at Santa Anna.
Georgian	United Kingdom	The steamship was driven ashore at Smyrna, Ottoman Empire. She was on a voyage from Smyrna to London. She was refloated and resumed her voyage.

== 12 September ==
List of shipwrecks: 12 September 1880
Ship	State	Description
Afghan	United Kingdom	The steamship ran aground on the Vega el Allum Shoal, in the Red Sea off Jeddah, Hejaz Vilayet. She was refloated on 14 September and resumed her voyage two days later.
Blanche Maud	United Kingdom	The pilot boat was driven ashore and damaged at Breaksea Point, Glamorgan. She was refloated.
Cygnet	United Kingdom	The steamship ran aground in the Scheldt at Oude Doel, Belgium. She was on a voyage from Liverpool, Lancashire to Antwerp, Belgium. She was refloated with assistance from the tugs Hercules and Success (Both Belgium).
Margaret	United Kingdom	The fishing smack was wrecked at Scarborough, Yorkshire.
Princess	Trinity House	The pilot cutter was run into off Dover, Kent by the steamship Bengo (Portugal). She was towed in to Dover and beached.
President Trakrauen	Netherlands	The full-rigged ship was driven ashore. She was refloated and put in to IJmuiden, North Holland. She was on a voyage from South Shields, County Durham, United Kingdom to Javan, Netherlands East Indies.
Sippe Vesser	Netherlands	The ship was driven ashore in the Nieuwe Diep. She was on a voyage from London, United Kingdom to Amsterdam, North Holland. She was refloated.

== 13 September ==
List of shipwrecks: 13 September 1880
Ship	State	Description
Covadonga	Chilean Navy	War of the Pacific: The schooner was sunk by a mine at Chancay, Peru. Thirty-three crew were killed and 48 were taken prisoner.
Frier Arbour	Belgium	The fishing vessel sprang a leak and was beached at Covehithe, Suffolk, United Kingdom, where she was wrecked. Her crew were rescued.
Gardeicke	Italy	The ship, a barque or a steamship, was wrecked at "Ignacio", Uruguay with the loss of two of her crew. She was on a voyage from Cádiz, Spain to Montevideo, Uruguay.
Johann Benjamin	Germany	The barque ran aground at Kastrup, Denmark. She was on a voyage from Memel to Belfast, County Antrim, United Kingdom. She was refloated.
Luna	United Kingdom	The ship ran aground on the Boston Knock, in the North Sea. She was refloated the next day and taken in to King's Lynn, Norfolk in a leaky condition.
Minerva	United Kingdom	The schooner was driven ashore at Mostyn, Flintshire. She was on a voyage from Wicklow to Saltney, Cheshire.

== 14 September ==
List of shipwrecks: 14 September 1880
Ship	State	Description
Aurora	United Kingdom	The steamship foundered 35 nautical miles (65 km) north of Ouessant, Finistère, France. Seven of her 22 passengers and crew were rescued by Consul (Flag unknown). Seven more reached the French coast in a boat. Aurora was on a voyage from Porto, Portugal to Southampton, Hampshire.
Benvenue	United Kingdom	The steamship was run into by Prinz Friedrich Karl (Germany) at Sunderland, County Durham and was severely damaged.
Blanche	United Kingdom	The barque ran aground on the Motherbank, in the Solent. She was on a voyage from St. Ubes, Portugal to Rotterdam, South Holland, Netherlands. She was refloated with assistance and caken in to Cowes, Isle of Wight.
Caroline Goodyear	United Kingdom	The ship collided with HMS Defence (Royal Navy) and was severely damaged. Caroline Goodyear was on a voyage from Teignmouth, Devon to Runcorn, Cheshire.
Catherine	United Kingdom	The brigantine was driven ashore at Port Talbot, Glamorgan. She was on a voyage from Bideford, Devon to Port Talbot.
City of Cambridge	United Kingdom	The steamship ran aground at Diamond Harbour, India. She was on a voyage from Glasgow, Renfrewshire to Calcutta, India.
Digby Grand	United Kingdom	The steamship was driven ashore at Port Talbot.
Fortune	France	The ship departed from Bône for Algiers, Algeria. No further trace, reported missing.
Gustave et Henri	Belgium	The fishing vessel ran aground on the Holmsand, in the North Sea off the coast of Suffolk, United Kingdom. She was refloated with the assistance of a tug.
Joseph and Mary Ann	United Kingdom	The galiot ran aground on the Knock Sand, in the Boston Deeps, off the coast of Lincolnshire.
Kermaria	France	The barque collided with the barque Saturn (Germany) and foundered in the English Channel off Portland, Dorset, United Kingdom. All on board survived. Kermaria was on a voyage from London to Cardiff, Glamorgan, United Kingdom.
Mary	United Kingdom	The schooner was driven ashore at Fethard, County Tipperary and was abandoned by her crew. She was on a voyage from Llanelli, Glamorgan to Fethard.
Medea	United Kingdom	The schooner was driven ashore and severely damaged at Trefusis Point, Cornwall.
Medina	United Kingdom	The ship foundered off the Welsh coast with the loss of all hands.
Raphael	Netherlands	The brig was driven ashore and wrecked near Thisted, Denmark. She was on a voyage from Saint Petersburg, Russia to Amsterdam, North Holland.

== 15 September ==
List of shipwrecks: 15 September 1880
Ship	State	Description
Beta	United Kingdom	The ship was wrecked at Cape North, Nova Scotia, Canada. Her crew were rescued. She was on a voyage from Gloucester to Miramichi, New Brunswick, Canada.
Braunzweig	Germany	The steamship foundered at sea. Her crew were rescued.
Catharina	United Kingdom	The smack was abandoned off the coast of Pembrokeshire. Her crew were rescued by the Fishguard Lifeboat.
Ellen Frances	United Kingdom	The steamship was driven ashore on Carrack Gladden Beach, St Ives, Cornwall. Her crew took to the ship's boat and landed safely. She was on a voyage from Swansea, Glamorgan to Mevagissey, Cornwall.
Ferdinand	France	The ship collided with Adolph (France) and sank. Ferdinand was on a voyage form Saint Pierre and Miquelon to "Bedeyen".
Ferdinand van der Taelen	Belgium	The steamship was driven ashore at Kertch, Russia. She was on a voyage from Taganrog, Russia to an American port.
James and Sarah	United Kingdom	The trow foundered in the Bristol Channel with the loss of all four crew. She was on a voyage from Lydney, Gloucestershire to Bridgwater, Somerset.
Jane Smith	United Kingdom	The schooner ran aground off St Ives. Her six crew were rescued by the St Ives Lifeboat. She was on a voyage from Llanelly, Glamorgan to Ipswich, Suffolk.
Magdala	United Kingdom	The full-rigged ship capsized at London. Several of her crew were severely injured. She was righted.
Mary Ann	United Kingdom	The smack was driven ashore at Pwllgwaelod, Pemprokeshire.
Osnabruck	Germany	The brigantine was driven ashore at Goodwick, Pembrokeshire. All on board were rescued by the Goodwick Lifeboat. She was later refloated and taken in to Fishguard.
Pelican	United Kingdom	The yacht was driven from her anchors and ran aground at Grimsby, Lincolnshire.
Quickstep	United States	The steamship ran aground at the mouth of the Coquelle River and was wrecked.
Skaane	Sweden	The brig was driven ashore on Læsø, Denmark. She was on a voyage from Newcastle upon Tyne, Northumberland, United Kingdom to Gävle.
Stefanino	Italy	The barque was driven ashore in the Baie de Seine. Her crew were rescued. She was on a voyage from Baltimore, Maryland, United States to Rouen, Seine-Inférieure, France.
Teazer	United Kingdom	The schooner ran aground in Liverpool Bay and was scuttled.
Volunteer	(United Kingdom of Great Britain and Ireland) Guernsey	The brig was driven ashore and wrecked at Newton-by-the-Sea, Northumberland. She was on a voyage from London to the Firth of Forth.
West of England	United Kingdom	The steamship sprang a leak and foundered in the Atlantic Ocean with the loss of a crew member. Survivors were rescued by George Washington (Germany). West of England was on a voyage from Villareal, Spain to Liverpool, Lancashire.

== 16 September ==
List of shipwrecks: 16 September 1880
Ship	State	Description
Alberti	France	The fishing schooner was abandoned in the Atlantic Ocean. Her 22 crew were rescued by Titania (Norway). Alberti was on a voyage from the Newfoundland Colony to the Île de Ré, Charente-Inférieure.
Alpheta	United Kingdom	The barque was driven ashore at Fleetwood, Lancashire. She was on a voyage from Fleetwood to Valparaíso, Chile. She was refloated and towed in to Liverpool, Lancashire.
Beta	United Kingdom	The ship was wrecked at Cape North, Nova Scotia, Canada. Her crew were rescued. She was on a voyage from Gloucester to Miramichi, New Brunswick, Canada.
Bonne Adèle	France	The schooner struck Hayle Bar and was driven ashore on Lelant beach, Cornwall, United Kingdom. Her crew were rescued by the Hayle Lifeboat. She was on a voyage from Llanelly, Glamorgan, United Kingdom to Cherbourg, Manche.
British Empire	United Kingdom	The ship was damaged by fire at New York, United States. She was on a voyage from New York to Havana, Cuba.
Delabole	United Kingdom	The smack foundered off Clovelly, Devon. Her crew were rescued.
Hendrika	Netherlands	The kuff was driven ashore on Terschelling, Friesland. She was on a voyage from Saint Petersburg, Russia to Zwolle, Overijssel.
Mero	Italy	The barque caught fire at Gibraltar. She was on a voyage from Oran, Algeria to Cardiff, Glamorgan.
Stella	United Kingdom	The schooner was driven ashore and wrecked at Seacliff, Lothian. Her crew were rescued. She was on a voyage from Fraserburgh, Aberdeenshire to Hamburg, Germany.
Swallow	United Kingdom	The Mersey Flat was driven ashore and wrecked at Penmaenmawr, Caernarfonshire. Her four crew were rescued.
Teaser	United Kingdom	The schooner was driven ashore in the Rock Channel and was scuttled.
Wild Rose	United Kingdom	The ship was observed in distress in the Atlantic Ocean whilst on a voyage from the West Indies to a British port. No further trace, presumed foundered with the loss of all 23 crew.

== 17 September ==
List of shipwrecks: 17 September 1880
Ship	State	Description
Ada Letitia	United Kingdom	The ship was wrecked at Ballyshannon, County Donegal, United Kingdom.
Belle	United Kingdom	The ship collided with an iceberg in the Grand Banks of Newfoundland and sank. Her crew were rescued by the steamship Hibernian (United Kingdom). Belle was on a voyage from Harbour Grace, Newfoundland Colony to "Bolster Rock".
Burgomeister	Germany	The steamship foundered in the Baltic Sea. Her crew were rescued. She was on a voyage from Stettin to Charlestown, Cornwall, United Kingdom.
Medena	United Kingdom	The schooner was wrecked at Rhyl, Denbighshire with the loss of all three crew.

== 18 September ==
List of shipwrecks: 18 September 1880
Ship	State	Description
Alice Ada	United Kingdom	The ship was driven ashore on "Madame Island". She was on a voyage from Whitehaven, Cumberland to Sackville, New Brunswick, Canada. She was refloated the next day and resumed her voyage.
Anxious	Greece	The lighter collided with the steamship Norah (United Kingdom) and sank at Sulina, United Principalities.
Camille	France	The barque was driven ashore at Banana, International Association of the Congo.
Colin Russell	United Kingdom	The schooner ran aground on the Gordon Flats, in Liverpool Bay and sank. She was on a voyage from Ramsey, Isle of Man to Liverpool, Lancashire.

== 19 September ==
List of shipwrecks: 19 September 1880
Ship	State	Description
Reverence	United Kingdom	The ship ran aground on the Jordan Flats, in Liverpool Bay. She was on a voyage from Fowey, Cornwall to "Western Point". She was refloated and beached at Liverpool, Lancashire.
Rose	United Kingdom	The schooner ran aground on Taylor's Bank, in Liverpool Bay, and sank. Her crew were rescued by the Point of Ayr Lifeboat.

== 20 September ==
List of shipwrecks: 20 September 1880
Ship	State	Description
1Alsatia	United Kingdom	The steamship suffered an explosion and fire in her bunkers after 18 September. She was on a voyage from New York, United States to Liverpool, Lancashire. She put back to New York.
Dahomey	Russia	The steamship was driven ashore and wrecked in the Nieuwe Diep. Her crew were rescued. She was on a voyage from Riga to Schiedam, South Holland, Netherlands.
Edmond	France	The schooner Edmond was run into by the barque Navigator (Russia) and sank in the English Channel ff Dungeness, Kent, United Kingdom. Her crew were rescued. Navigator was severely damaged.
Llanishen	United Kingdom	The steamship was damaged by an onboard explosion at Cardiff, Glamorgan.
Paul Boyton	Canada	The ship ran aground on the Goodwin Sands, Kent. Her crew were rescued by the Deal and Ramsgate Lifeboats. She was on a voyage from Baltimore, Maryland, United States to Hamburg, Germany.
Ross	United Kingdom	The schooner was driven ashore at Prestatyn, Denbighshire. Her crew were rescued.

== 21 September ==
List of shipwrecks: 21 September 1880
Ship	State	Description
Emanuel Butcher	United Kingdom	The brig ran aground on the Scheelhoek, off Hellevoetsluis, Zeeland, Netherlands. She was on a voyage from South Shields, County Durham to Rotterdam, South Holland, Netherlands.
Fanny	Italy	The barque ran aground in the Gironde. She was on a voyage from Trieste to Bordeaux, Gironde, France. She was refloated and taken in to Bordeaux in a severely leaky condition.
Tre	Trieste	The ship departed from New York, United States for Trieste. No further trace,. reported missing.
Victoria	United Kingdom	The steamship ran into the pier at Folkestone, Kent and was severely damaged. She was on a voyage from Boulogne, Pas-de-Calais, France to Folkestone.
Unnamed	United Kingdom	A lighter sank at Hull, Yorkshire.
Unnamed	flag unknown	A ship caught fire off the Dutch coast.

== 22 September ==
List of shipwrecks: 22 September 1880
Ship	State	Description
Blue Cross	United Kingdom	The steamship ran aground on Saltholm, Denmark. She was on a voyage from South Shields, County Durham to Saint Petersburg, Russia. She was refloated and resumed her voyage.
Langdale	United Kingdom	The ship ran aground on Neckmann's Ground, in the Baltic Sea.
Matthew Cay	United Kingdom	The barque departed from South Shields, County Durham for Nice, Alpes-Maritimes, France. No further trace, reported overdue, feard to have foundered with the loss of all fourteen crew.
Thornton	United Kingdom	The ship ran aground at Ballynass, County Londonderry. She was on a voyage from Ballyinass to Runcorn, Cheshire. She was refloated and resumed her voyage.
Unnamed	France	A ferry was capsized by the tidal bore near Bordeaux, Gironde with the loss of six passengers.

== 23 September ==
List of shipwrecks: 23 September 1880
Ship	State	Description
Astarte	United Kingdom	The steamship ran aground at Ven, Sweden. She was on a voyage from Hull, Yorkshire to Reval, Russia. She was refloated with assistance and taken in to Copenhagen, Denmark.
Esperance	France	The pilot boat capsized and sank at the mouth of the Gironde with the loss of one life. Survivors were rescued by another pilot boat.
Ethel	United Kingdom	The steamship ran aground at Maassluis, South Holland, Netherlands. She was on a voyage from Bilbao, Spain to Rotterdam, South Holland.
Melpomene	United Kingdom	The ship was wrecked on the Invisible Bank, in the Andaman Islands. Her crew were rescued on 27 September by the steamship Kilwa (United Kingdom). Melpomene was on a voyage from Liverpool, Lancashire to Moulmein, Burma.
Misty Morn	United Kingdom	The pilot boat was driven ashore at the mouth of the Afon Col-huw. Her crew survived.
Teazer	United Kingdom	The ship was driven ashore near Westward Ho!, Devon.
Valetta	United Kingdom	The fishing boat ran aground at Dover, Kent. She was refloated with assistance from the tug Palmerston (United Kingdom).

== 24 September ==
List of shipwrecks: 24 September 1880
Ship	State	Description
Florence Meyer	United States	The steamship struck a snag and sank with the loss of five lives.
Lloyds	United Kingdom	The steamship was driven ashore at Dungeness, Kent. She was reflaoted and resumed her voyage.
Magdeburg and an unnamed vessel	United Kingdom; Flag unknown	The steamship Magdeburg ran down and sank a steamship in the English Channel off Portland, Dorset with the loss of all hands. Magdeburg was on a voyage from Hartlepool, County Durham to Odesa, Russia. She put in to Southampton, Hampshire in a severely damaged condition.
Neilson Taylor	United Kingdom	The steamship ran aground on the Goldstone Rock, off the coast of Northumberland. She was on a voyage from Amble, Northumberland to Dundee, Forfarshire. She was refloated on 26 September and beached at Lindisfarne, Northumberland.
Orpheus	United Kingdom	The brig was run into by the steamship Viking (United Kingdom) at Erith, Kent and was severely damaged. She was beached in a waterlogged condition with assistance from the tug Cruiser (United Kingdom).

== 25 September ==
List of shipwrecks: 25 September 1880
Ship	State	Description
Cupid	United Kingdom	The steamboat was run down and sunk in the River Thames at Woolwich, Kent by the steamship D. S. Ward (United Kingdom). Her eight crew were rescued.
Fred	United Kingdom	The Humber Keel was run into by the steamship Altona (United Kingdom) and sank in the River Ouse at Faxfleet, Yorkshire. She was refloated the next day and taken in to Goole for repairs.
Sphinx	Germany	The brig ran aground at "Sondre Ross", Norway. She was on a voyage from Gloucester, United Kingdom to Danzig. She was refloated and taken in to Copenhagen, Denmark.

== 26 September ==
List of shipwrecks: 26 September 1880
Ship	State	Description
Allerwash	United Kingdom	The steamship ran aground off Harlingen, Friesland, Netherlands. She was on a voyage from Newcastle upon Tyne, Northumberland to Harlingen. She was refloated the next day and taken in to Harlingen.
Armand	France	The barque was run into by the steamship Patriot (Sweden) and was severely damaged. She put back to the River Tyne.
Canopus	United Kingdom	The steamship ran aground off Kintyre, Argyllshire. She was on a voyage from Liverpool, Lancashire to Boston, Massachusetts, United States. Her passengers were taken off. She was refloated on 2 October with assistance from the tugs Cruiser and Wrestler (both United Kingdom) and towed in to Liverpool.
Estage	France	The schooner was severely damaged by an onboard explosion at Newport, Monmouthshire, United Kingdom. Five of her crew were injured.
Irish	United Kingdom	The steamship ran ashore on the Mull of Galloway, Wigtownshire. She was on a voyage from Morecambe, Lancashire to Londonderry. She was refloated and resumed her voyage.
Queen Bee	United Kingdom	The yacht struck wreckage and foundered in the English Channel 3 nautical miles (5.6 km) off St. Catherine's Point, Isle of Wight. Her crew were rescued.
Roundshot	United Kingdom	The brigantine was driven ashore and wrecked at Maughold Head, Isle of Man. She was on a voyage from Belfast, County Antrim to Garston, Lancashire.

== 27 September ==
List of shipwrecks: 27 September 1880
Ship	State	Description
Apollo	United Kingdom	The steamship was driven ashore on Holy Isle, in the Firth of Clyde. She was on a voyage from Glasgow, Renfrewshire to Barrow-in-Furness, Lancashire. She was refloated on 29 September and taken in to Lamlash for temporary repairs before putting back to Glasgow.
Asterion	United Kingdom	The barque was driven ashore at Chittagong, India. She was on a voyage from Liverpool, Lancashire to Chittagong. She was refloated and taken in to Chittagong.
Henry	United Kingdom	The steamship was damaged at Newport, Monmouthshire when she slipped off the blocks in a drydock.
Lizzie and Emma	United Kingdom	The schooner was destroyed by fire in Lynnhaven Bay. Her crew were rescued. She was on a voyage from Norfolk, Virginia, United States to Jamaica.
Lumley, and the Mapon Lightship	United Kingdom; France	The steamship Lumley collided with the Mapon Lightship. Lumley took the lightship in tow and she was beached on the Gironde coast. Lumley also ran ashore.
Maria Mignon	France	The steamship ran ashore on Saltholm, Denmark.
Quadroon	United Kingdom	The ship departed from Swansea, Glamorgan for Huelva, Spain. No further trace, reported missing.

== 28 September ==
List of shipwrecks: 28 September 1880
Ship	State	Description
Agia Sofia	United Kingdom	The steamship was run into by the steamship Newton (United Kingdom) in the River Mersey and was holed. Her passengers were taken off. Agia Sofia was on a voyage from Liverpool, Lancashire to Constantinople, Ottoman Empire.
America	United States	Bow section of America, 13 June 2022. During a voyage from Chicago, Illinois, to Escanaba, Michigan, the schooner ran over lines connecting the tugs M. A. Gagno and A. W. Lawrence (both United States) to scows they were towing in Lake Michigan near Two Rivers, Wisconsin, and sank 4 nautical miles (7.4 km; 4.6 mi) offshore and 9 nautical miles (17 km; 10 mi) north of Two Rivers Light. She came to rest with her bow underwater and stern in the air. A failed salvage attempt by M. A. Gagno and the wrecking tug Winslow (United States) on 6 October caused her seams to open, and she sank in 130 feet (40 m) of water at 44°21.048′N 087°26.850′W. Her wreck lies in the Wisconsin Shipwreck Coast National Marine Sanctuary.
Ann Beer	United Kingdom	The ship departed from Fowey, Cornwall for Agrigento, Sicily, Italy. No further trace, presumed foundered with the loss of all hands.
Asia	Germany	The steamship was wrecked on Socotra, Aden Governorate. Her crew were rescued by the steamship Prins Hendrick (Netherlands). Asia was on a voyage from Amoy, China to New York, United States.
Berwick	United Kingdom	The steamship collided with a hopper barge and sank off the mouth of the River Tyne. She was on a voyage from South Shields, County Durham to London. She was refloated.
Cygnet	United Kingdom	The steamship ran ashore on a rock off Luing, in the Slate Islands.
Fitzwilliam	United Kingdom	The steamship ran aground at Ouistreham, Calvados, France. She was on a voyage from Leven, Fife to Caen, Calvados. She was refloated.
Mildred	United Kingdom	The steamship departed from New York for Marseille, Bouches-du-Rhône, France. No further trace, presumed foundered with the loss of all 23 crew.

== 29 September ==
List of shipwrecks: 29 September 1880
Ship	State	Description
Alarm	United Kingdom	The schooner collided with the steamship Countess of Dumfries (United Kingdom) off The Lizard, Cornwall and was abandoned. Her crew were rescued by Countess of Dumfries. Alarm was on a voyage from Pembroke to London. She consequently foundered.
Arthur	United Kingdom	The lighter was sunk at Glasgow, Renfrewshire when a boiler was dropped whilst being unloaded.
Cedar	United Kingdom	The steamship ran aground on Oyster Island, in the Blenich Channel. She was on a voyage from Sligo to Glasgow. She was refloated and resumed her voyage.
Ethiopia	United Kingdom	The steamship ran aground in the Clyde. She was on a voyage from New York, United States to Glasgow. She was refloated.
Florence	United Kingdom	The schooner was driven ashore and wrecked in the Rio Grande. She was on a voyage from Liverpool, Lancashire to the Rio Grande.
Jacob E. Ridgeway	United States	The ship was abandoned in the Atlantic Ocean. She was on a voyage from New York to Pará, Brazil.
Lily Maud	United Kingdom	The ship departed from "Dark Tickle", Labrador, Newfoundland Colony for Genoa, Italy. No further trace, reported missing.
Maese	United Kingdom	The brig caught fire at sea. She was run ashore at Hasle, Bornholm, Denmark the next day and burnt out. Her six crew survived. She was on a voyage from Gävle, Sweden to Sunderland, County Durham.
Miranda	Denmark	The barque was incorrectly berthed at Grimsby, Lincolnshire, United Kingdom and broke her back when the tide went out.
Reliance	(United Kingdom of Great Britain and Ireland) Isle of Man	The steamship struck rocks off Grassholm, Pembrokeshire and was damaged.
Speculant	Germany	The barque ran aground off "Bagharn", Grand Duchy of Finland.
Superb	United Kingdom	The ship ran aground and was wrecked at Bideford, Devon. She was on a voyage from Newport, Monmouthshire to Barnstaple, Devon.

== 30 September ==
List of shipwrecks: 30 September 1880
Ship	State	Description
Arthur	United Kingdom	The steam lighter was sunk at Grangemouth, Stirlingshire when an 18-ton boiler was dropped as it was being loaded.
Empress	United Kingdom	The barque was driven ashore in the Yangtze. She was on a voyage from Nagasaki, Japan to a Chinese port. She had been refloated by 7 November and taken in to Shanghai, China.
Fanny	France	The ship departed from Philadelphia, Pennsylvania, United States for Havre de Grâce, Seine-Inférieure. No further trace, reported hopelessly overdue.
Formosa	France	The barque foundered in the Atlantic Ocean. Eleven survivors took to a boat; they were rescued on 4 October by City of Richmond (United Kingdom), but two of them died shortly afterwards. Formosa was on a voyage from Bathurst, Gambia Colony and Protectorate to Marseille, Bouches-du-Rhône.
Hope	United Kingdom	The smack was driven ashore in Bideford Bay.
Johana Dahl	Norway	The schooner ran aground on the Holm Sand, in the North Sea off the coast of Suffolk, United Kingdom. She was on a voyage from Brevig to Lowestoft, Suffolk.
Johanna Clasine	Netherlands	The ship ran aground on the Lysegrund and sank. Her crew were rescued. She was on a voyage from Amsterdam, North Holland to Riga, Russia.
Margaretha	United Kingdom	The barque was driven ashore and wrecked at Cape San Antonio, Argentina.
Mimi	Germany	The schooner was driven ashore at Buenos Aires, Argentina. She was refloated with the assistance of a tug.
Unnamed	Flag unknown	A schooner capsized 8 nautical miles (15 km) off the Jedderen.

== Unknown date ==
List of shipwrecks: Unknown date in September 1879
Ship	State	Description
Abraham Lincoln	United States	The schooner foundered off the coast of Liberia in late September with the loss of 30 lives.
Ada Wiswell	United Kingdom	The ship ran aground on the Shingle Sand, off the Kent coast. She was refloated.
Aline	United Kingdom	The barque was wrecked at Ignacio, California, United States.
Allemagne	France	The brig collided with the steamship Clymene (United Kingdom) and sank with the loss of two of her six crew. Allemagne was on a voyage from Newport, Monmouthshire, United Kingdom to Lorient, Morbihan.
Aramis	France	The ship ran aground near Adra, Spain. She was on a voyage from Cardiff, Glamorgan, United Kingdom to Agrigento, Sicily, Italy. She was refloated and resumed her voyage.
Audhild	United Kingdom	The ship was driven ashore on White Island, Canada. She was on a voyage from Sharpness, Gloucestershire to Quebec City, Canada.
Aurora	United Kingdom	The steamship foundered 5 nautical miles (9.3 km) off the Île Vierge, Finistère, France. She was on a voyage from Porto, Portugal to Southampton, Hampshire.
Barden	(Russian Empire) Grand Duchy of Finland	The barque was driven ashore on Porkkalanniemi.
Bari	Spain	The barque was driven ashore at Tunara. She was refloated and resumed her voyage.
Belgravia	United Kingdom	The ship was driven ashore at "Point la Cive", Canada. Her crew were rescued. She was on a voyage from Greenock, Renfrewshire to Quebec City.
Bermuda	United States	The ship was damaged by fire at New York.
Benham	United States	The ship ran aground in the Schuylkill River. She was on a voyage from "Porman" to Philadelphia, Pennsylvania, She was refloated with assistance.
Castalia	United States	The brig ran aground at Block Island, Rhode Island. She was on a voyage from New York to Seville, Spain. She was refloated.
Chuquiasca	France	The barque was driven ashore at Narva, Russia.
City of Moule	United States	The ship was abandoned at sea before 3 September. She was on a voyage from Mobile, Alabama to Guadeloupe.
City of St. Catherine's	United States	The ship collided with the steamship J. Tarsh (United States) and sank at Buffalo, New York. Her crew survived.
Cleonice Bava	Italy	The barque was abandoned at sea after 9 September. Her crew were rescued by the steamship Zubaran (Spain), which towed Cleonice Bava in to Ferrol, Spain. Cleonice Bava was on a voyage from the Clyde to Savona.
Cranaqueen	United Kingdom	The ship foundered in the English Channel off Dover, Kent in mid-September with the loss of all 26 crew. She was on a voyage from Antwerp, Belgium to Sydney, New South Wales.
Djelibah	France	The steamship ran aground on the False Ras Garib Reef, in the Gulf of Suez. She was on a voyage from Glasgow, Renfrewshire to Bombay, India. She was refloated and resumed her voyage.
Emmanuel Boutcher	United Kingdom	The ship was driven ashore near Hellevoetsluis, Zeeland, Netherlands. She was on a voyage from Newcastle upon Tyne, Northumberland to Rotterdam, South Holland.
Eric the Red	United States	The full-rigged ship was driven ashore and wrecked at Cape Otway, Victoria. Her crew were rescued. She was on a voyage from New York to Melbourne, Victoria.
Erin's Star	United Kingdom	The ship was driven ashore at Point Reyes, California, United States. She was on a voyage from Antwerp to San Francisco, California.
Eurydice	United Kingdom	The ship was driven ashore at Saint John, New Brunswick, Canada. She was refloated and taken in to Saint John in a leaky condition.
Faro	Norway	The barque was abandoned in the Atlantic Ocean 300 nautical miles (560 km) off New York. Her crew were rescued by the brig Willie (United Kingdom).
Fernand	France	The ship collided with Adolph (France) and sank. Fernand was on a voyage from Saint-Pierre, Saint Pierre and Miquelon to the Île d'Yeu, Vendée.
Flavin	United Kingdom	The steamship ran ashore on the Canadian coast; her captain blamed his compass. The cargo included fifteen cases of musical instruments, some of which contained jew's harps and a large packet of magnets.
Francesco Tanguinette	Italy	The barque was wrecked on the English Bank, in the River Plate. Her crew were rescued. She was on a voyage from Marseille, Bouches-du-Rhône, France to Montevideo, Uruguay.
Fresno	United States	The barque was damaged in a gale at Montevideo, Uruguay. She was on a voyage from Bordeaux, Gironde, France to San Francisco, California.
Gateacre	United Kingdom	The ship was driven ashore at "Moyapore", India. She was on a voyage from Calcutta, India to Mauritius.
Gladys	United Kingdom	The steamship ran aground at Dungeness. She was refloated and resumed her voyage.
Hamilton	United Kingdom	The brig was wrecked the mouth of the Brass River, Africa before 12 September. Her crew were rescued. She was on a voyage from Troon, Ayrshire to the west coast of Africa.
Hope	United Kingdom	The smack ran aground on the South Tail, in Bideford Bay.
Hurnforth	United Kingdom	The steamship collided with an iceberg in the Strait of Belle Isle on or before 2 September and was severely damaged.
Jeune Gustave	France	The schooner was driven ashore at Folkestone, Kent. She was refloated and resumed her voyage.
José	Spain	The brig was abandoned in the Atlantic Ocean. She was on a voyage from Bilbao to Philadelphia.
Louis de Geer	Sweden	The full-rigged ship was destroyed by fire at sea. Her crew were rescued by Van Lennep (Netherlands). Louis de Geer was on a voyage from the River Tyne to Java, Netherlands East Indies.
Laboramus	United Kingdom	The ship was abandoned in the Atlantic Ocean before 27 September.
Macassar	France	The brig was wrecked at Saint Marie, Madagascar. All on board were rescued.
Magnet	United Kingdom	The schooner was wrecked on the Île de Quéménès, Finistère, France. She was on a voyage from Bilbao, Spain to Newport, Monmouthshire.
Maria	Flag unknown	The galiot was abandoned in the North Sea before 22 September.
Matilde	Spain	The barque caught fire in the Indian Ocean before 24 September and was abandoned by her crew. She was on a voyage from Manila, Spanish East Indies to Liverpool,
Miriam	Flag unknown	The ship was abandoned in the Atlantic Ocean before 20 September. The fore part of the vessel came ashore at Saint Augustine, Florida, United States on that date.
Otter	Hudson's Bay Company	The ship struck the Rock Bella Bella.
Our Own	New South Wales	The steamship suffered an engine breakdown and was driven ashore and wrecked at Bass Point. She was on a voyage from Sydney to Shoalhaven.
Patience	United Kingdom	The ship became waterlogged in the Dogger Bank. She was on a voyage from Kotka, Russia to Gravesend, Kent. She completed her voyage in a waterlogged condition.
Pfeil	Germany	The brigantine was wrecked on the English Bank. She was on a voyage from Pernambuco, Brazil to Montevideo.
Prince Leopold	United Kingdom	The barque dragged her anchors and was damaged at Montevideo. She was on a voyage from Cardiff to Montevideo. She was towed in to Montevideo in a leaky condition.
Recovery	United Kingdom	The ship was driven ashore at "Bona Ventua", Canada. She was on a voyage from Dalhousie, New Brunswick to Liverpool. She was refloated and resumed her voyage.
Reina del Sud	(United Kingdom of Great Britain and Ireland) Gibraltar	The hulk was run into by the steamship Earl of Rosebery (United Kingdom) at Gibraltar and was beached.
Richard	Germany	The barque was destroyed by fire at Valparaíso, Chile. Her crew were rescued. She was on a voyage from Liverpool to Valparaíso.
Saga	Sweden	The barque was driven ashore and wrecked at Escuminac, New Brunswick. She was on a voyage from Liverpool to Miramichi, New Brunswick.
Stanhope	United Kingdom	The barque was driven ashore at "Poeloe Petri", Netherlands East Indies on or before 27 September. She was on a voyage from Pensacola, Florida to Java, Netherlands East Indies.
Statsminister Stang	Netherlands	The ship was driven ashore new Liverpool, Nova Scotia, Canada. She was on a voyage from New York to Rotterdam, South Holland. She was later refloated and towed in to Halifax, Nova Scotia.
Swartwick	United Kingdom	The steamship caught fire off Gnarp, Sweden and was beached at "Galstrom" with the loss of five live.
Tagus	United Kingdom	The barque ran aground at Sproge, Gotland, Sweden.
Umberto	Italy	The ship was wrecked near Tenedos, Ottoman Empire before 24 September. Her crew were rescued.
Van der Palm	Netherlands	The barque was wrecked. Her crew were rescued. She was on a voyage from Pensacola, Florida, United States to Dublin, United Kingdom.
Wilhelm	Sweden	The brig ran aground on Saltholm, Denmark. She was refloated.
William VI	United Kingdom	The schooner sank at Grand-Bessam, Ivory Coast after 16 September. Her crew were rescued by Belle of the Sea (United Kingdom).
