= Dulas, Ithon =

River in Powys, Wales

Coordinates: 52.26364°N 3.37273°W

Dulas or Afon Dulas is a minor right-bank tributary of the River Ithon, itself a tributary of the River Wye. It is formed as several brooks meet near the village of Nantmel and runs east and southeast to join the Ithon just to the north of Llandrindod Wells.

== See also ==
- List of rivers of Wales
