= Llanfihangel Nant Brân =

Village in the county of Powys, Wales

Coordinates: 51.9972°N 3.5383°W

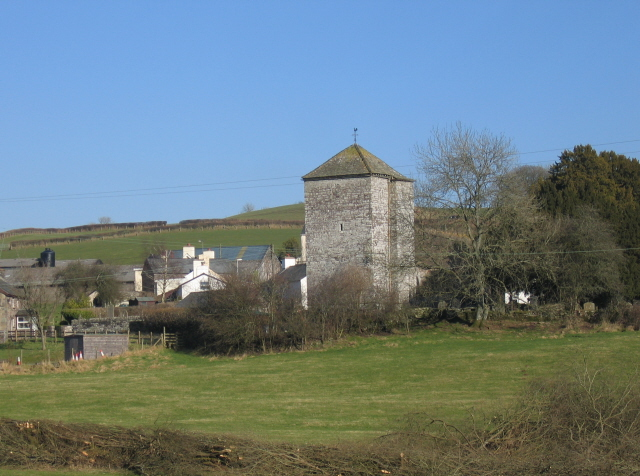
Saint Michael church of Llanfihangel Nant Brân

Llanfihangel Nant Brân is a small village lying next to the Nant Brân river in Powys, Wales about 7.5 miles (12 km) west of Brecon.

It is largely a farming community. Llanfihangel includes a church, dedicated to St. Michael, which was probably built in the 16th century and was substantially reconstructed in 1882.

Bethel Chapel was built between 1810 and 1811, and later rebuilt or modified between 1865 and 1866. It is in the simple round-headed style, of the long-wall entry type. The walls are rendered and whitewashed, with a slate eaved roof above. The windows are small-paned sashes with intersecting tracery in their heads. The interior of the chapel was gutted in 2000.

The film of On the Black Hill by Bruce Chatwin was shot here.
