= River Gavenny =

River in Monmouthshire, Wales

Coordinates: 51°50′07″N 3°00′12″W

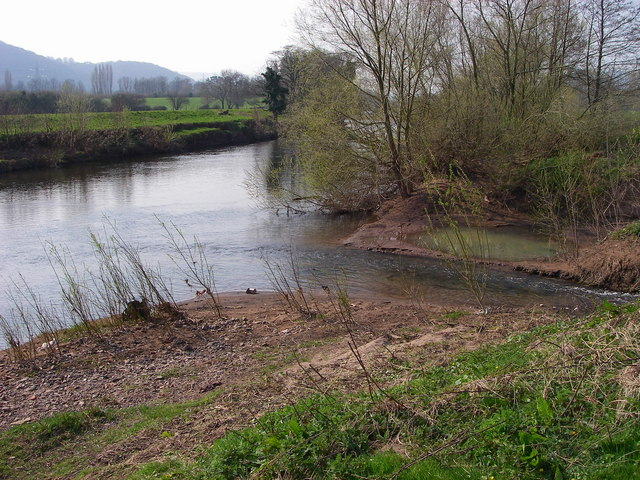
The confluence of the Gavenny and the Usk at Abergavenny

The River Gavenny or sometimes the Gavenny River (Welsh: Afon Gafenni) is a short river in Monmouthshire in south Wales. It rises 1 mile (1.6 km) southwest of the village of Llanvihangel Crucorney from springs near Penyclawdd Court, supplemented by springs in Blaen-Gavenny Wood and tributary streams there and within the Woodland Trust-owned Great Triley Wood. It flows south for about 4 miles (6.4 km) to its confluence with the River Usk towards the eastern end of Castle Meadows at Abergavenny. The town derives its English-language name from the Gavenny's confluence ('aber' in Welsh) with the River Usk. Of the buildings on the banks of the river, the Gothic Decorated style church of St Teilo at Llantilio Pertholey (OS grid ref SO 3114 1633) is especially notable. Parts of the church date from the thirteenth century with multiple additions since. Blaengavenny Farm, the name of which signifies the 'head of the Gavenny', is a sixteenth-century farmhouse near the river's source.

The diminutive Gavenny is something of a misfit stream in its broad valley. This is due to the deposition of a spectacular terminal moraine at Llanvihangel Crucorney which has diverted the former headwaters of the river eastwards into the Wye catchment. It is believed that the River Honddu which rises in the Black Mountains and possibly also the upper River Monnow formerly flowed in the valley of the Gavenny to join the Usk.

The lower half of the Gavenny, together with its right-bank tributary, the Cibi and also the Cibi Brook Relief Channel are all classed as 'main rivers' by Natural Resources Wales.

== River crossings ==
The river is crossed by road bridges north of Mardy at Triley Mill and at St Teilo's Church and also, to the east of Mardy by those carrying Nantgavenny Lane, Hereford Road (B4521) and Tredilion Road. The Nantgavenny Lane crossing carries both route 42 of the National Cycle Network and the Beacons Way over the river. The lowermost crossings are at Lower Monk Street (B4233), Monmouth Road A40 and Mill Street bridges east of Abergavenny town centre.

The old Llanvihangel Railway, a tramroad which predated the construction of the similarly routed Newport, Abergavenny and Hereford Railway in the 1850s closely followed the course of the river for much of its length north of Abergavenny, crossing the mill leat at Triley. The Newport, Abergavenny and Hereford Railway became a part of the Great Western Railway in 1863 and the line continues in service today carrying the Welsh Marches Line between Abergavenny and Hereford over the river at Triley. Another railway crossing of the river was constructed during the nineteenth century, carrying the former Merthyr, Tredegar and Abergavenny Railway west from its junction with the Newport, Abergavenny and Hereford line just upstream of Little Mill. This has now been converted to provide road access to a recent housing development.

Several footbridges cross the river of which the most notable are those at the southern end of Priory Wood and one on Castle Meadows.

== Corn mills on the Gavenny ==
There is a long history of exploitation of the Gavenny's flow to power corn mills; at least seven former mills are recorded. Triley Mill is the uppermost of these along the watercourse, sandwiched today between the railway to the west and the A465 to the east at OS grid ref SO 3105 1731. At Llantilio Pertholey is Brooklands Mill (OS grid ref SO 3109 1651), described by the RCAHMW as a 'possible corn-mill' whilst just east of Mardy where the Mynachdy Brook enters as a left-bank tributary is Cwm Mill (OS grid ref SO 3096 1555). Fed in part from water stored in ponds in Mardy Park, by 1901 the mill was disused and the southern pond, beside the mill, had disappeared.

Little Mill was a corn mill on Ross Road (at OS grid ref SO 3063 1465) dating back at least to 1707. A waterwheel and wheel pit lay immediately north of the still-surviving sandstone building which still contains original machinery. Little Mill House, a nineteenth-century building, stands just to its east. Priory Mill immediately to the northeast of Abergavenny (OS grid ref SO 3031 1445), while still in use in the late nineteenth century, had fallen into disuse by 1901. Traces of the 200 m-long leat fed from a weir on the river, and of the millpond, remain in the publicly accessible woodland which is traversed by a section of the Beacons Way. A former corn mill is recorded at OS grid ref SO 3000 1385 on Mill Street, Abergavenny. Water was led to this mill via a leat, now filled, from a weir immediately downstream of the bridge carrying Lower Monk Street over the river. The lowermost mill on the river was Philpotts Mill (at OS grid ref SO 3016 1375) recorded as a working mill in the late nineteenth century but which had ceased operation by 1920.

== Afon Cibi ==
The last tributary of the Gavenny before it meets with the Usk is the right-bank Afon Cibi, which despite its name is a stream rather than a river. The Cibi rises on the southern flanks of Sugar Loaf draining the ground between the Deri and Rholben spurs of that hill. Chapel Mill (at OS grid ref SO 2918 1556) was a corn mill still in operation on the Cibi in the early 1880s, with a short mill race and ponds fed from the stream. The mill had fallen into disuse by 1901. Much of the course of the stream through Abergavenny is now culverted though short sections beside the lower part of 'Pen-y-Pound' road and east of Market Street still run in the open.
