= Glasfynydd Forest =

Forest in mid Wales

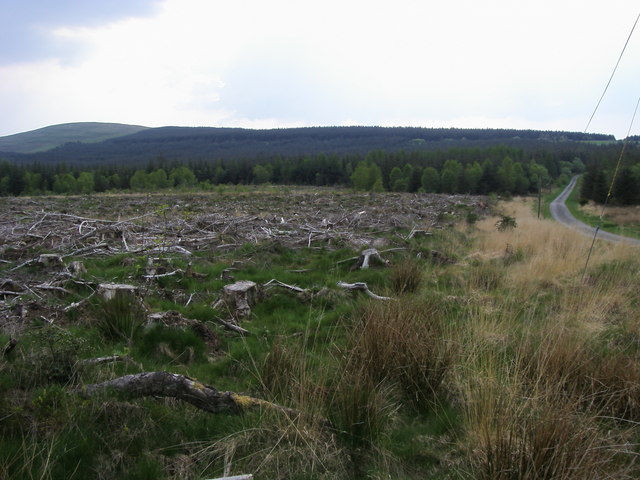
View in Glasfynydd Forest

Glasfynydd Forest is an extensive area of coniferous plantations in the west of the Brecon Beacons National Park in Wales. It straddles the border between the counties of Powys and Carmarthenshire.

The forest is divided into three blocks:

- The northernmost (51°56′42″N 3°43′34″W) encircles the Usk Reservoir near the head of the River Usk. Car parking and picnic facilities exist at the northern end of the Usk Reservoir dam on land owned by Dŵr Cymru Welsh Water and managed on its behalf by the Natural Resources Wales.
- The southernmost (51°54′29″N 3°39′43″W) is the largest block and occupies the ground south of the Usk valley and to the west of Crai which rises to Moel Feity.
- The smaller central block (51°55′37″N 3°42′04″W) lies to the south of the minor road between Trecastle and Llanddeusant at Mynydd Wysg. Car parking and picnic facilities are provided by Natural Resources Wales at Pont'ar Wysg on this road.
