= Afon Hydfer =

River in Powys, Wales

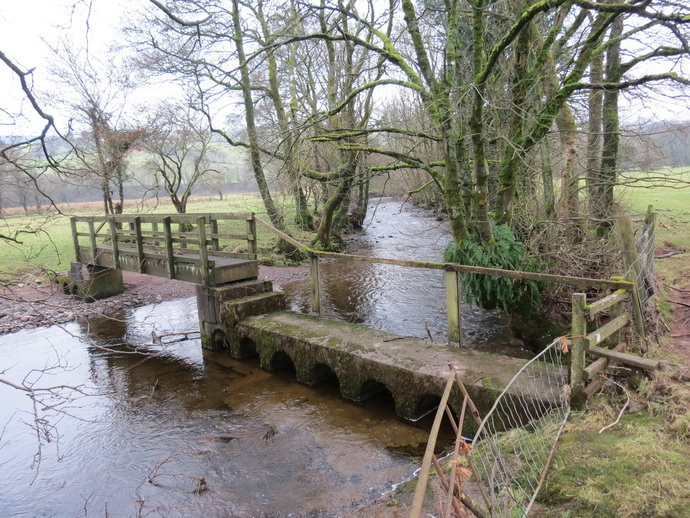
- Footbridge over Afon Hydfer in Llywel

- Location within Wales

Location
- Country: Wales
- County: Powys

Physical characteristics
- Source: Black Mountain
- Mouth
  - location: River Usk
  - coordinates: 51°56′00″N 3°39′24″W

The Afon Hydfer is a short river in Powys in the west of the Brecon Beacons National Park, south Wales. Its headwaters rise on the northeastern slopes of the Black Mountain as the streams named Trinant, Nant y Cadno, Nant yr Erydr and Crognant, joining to flow down Cwm yr Afon on the western edge of Glasfynydd Forest. The river turns east at Blaenau Uchaf, then northeast through Cwm Hydfer and joins the River Usk just below Pont ar Hydfer. Other tributaries of the Hydfer include the streams of Nant Cil-y-clawdd, Nant Crinog and Nant Meity.
