= Afon Cilieni =

River in Powys, Wales

Coordinates: 51°57′24″N 3°32′47″W

The Afon Cilieni is a short river which rises on the southern slopes of Mynydd Epynt in Powys, Wales. The name may mean 'the river rising in a small nook'.

Its upper reaches are within the military training area of SENTA, the British Army's Sennybridge Training Area. It flows through the hamlets of Pentre-bach and Pentre'r-felin en route to its confluence with the River Usk about 2 km east of Sennybridge. Like most other tributaries of the Usk, the Afon Cilieni is designated as a special area of conservation for various fish including three species of lamprey, the twaite shad and the European bullhead. Much of the length of the river is followed by the abandoned earthworks of the intended rail line to Llanwrtyd Wells, an offshoot of the Neath and Brecon Railway. Cuttings and embankments remain but none of the many bridge crossings of the Cilieni are known to have been put in place before the scheme was abandoned in the 1860s.
