= Pentre-bach, Powys =

Coordinates: 51.985°N 3.590°W

Pentre-bach
- Location within Powys
- Principal area: Powys
- Preserved county: Powys
- Country: Wales
- Sovereign state: United Kingdom
- Post town: Brecon
- Postcode district: LD3
- Police: Dyfed-Powys
- Fire: Mid and West Wales
- Ambulance: Welsh
- UK Parliament: Brecon, Radnor and Cwm Tawe
- Senedd Cymru – Welsh Parliament: Brycheiniog Tawe Nedd

Pentre-bach (Welsh for 'small village') is a hamlet (one of several in Wales with similar names) in Powys, Wales, in the former county and current Shire Committee Area of Brecknockshire (Breconshire). It is located on Afon Cilieni, a small tributary of the River Usk, between Brecon and Llandovery. The hamlet has a pub called the "Shoemakers Arms" or Tafarn y Crydd, and a former chapel, originally Calvinistic Methodist, named "Beili-du", Welsh for "black yard". The nearest church is in Llandeilo'r-Fan, 2 km to the NW, and the nearest shop is in Sennybridge, 4 km to the south.

Construction started of a railway line up the Cilieni valley, but was abandoned in 1867. (See Neath and Brecon Railway and.)
