= Sôr Brook =

Tributary of the River Usk in south Wales

Coordinates: 51°37′03″N 2°56′30″W

The Sôr Brook is a right bank tributary of the River Usk running largely in Monmouthshire in south Wales, though the watercourse forms the boundary with neighbouring Torfaen in places. Its uppermost reaches were inundated by the construction of Llandegfedd Reservoir which opened in May 1965 It now flows from beneath the dam of the reservoir southwards past Llandegveth to join the Usk in its tidal reach 1 km northeast of Caerleon.
