= Afon Cynrig =

River in Powys, Wales

Coordinates: 51.94677°N 3.39086°W

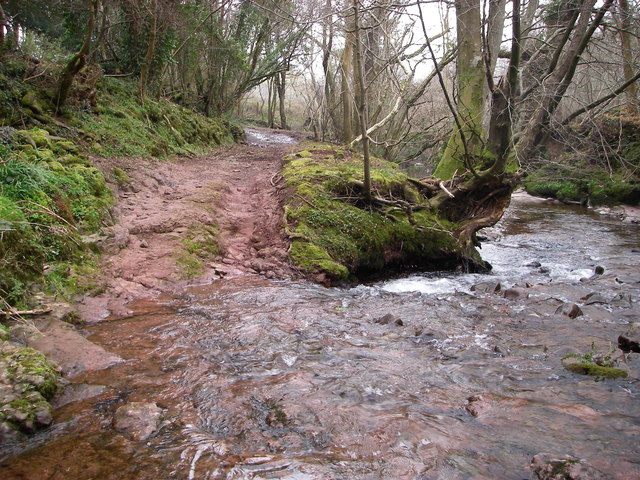
Ford across the Afon Cynrig

The Afon Cynrig is a river in Powys, Wales whose headwaters rise in the central Brecon Beacons and flow northwards to join the River Usk at Abercynrig just east of Brecon.

Two rivers combine to form the Cynrig just above Cantref - these being the Nant Sere and the Nant Cynwyn. They rise in two magnificent glacially carved valley heads beneath the peaks of Pen y Fan and Cribyn and Cribyn and Fan y Big respectively.

The 'Gap Road', an old route from Brecon to Merthyr Tydfil takes advantage of Cwm Cynwyn and the col at its head to cross this range of mountains at the heart of the Brecon Beacons National Park. It has been suggested that it is of Roman origin.
