= Caerfanell =

River in Powys, Wales

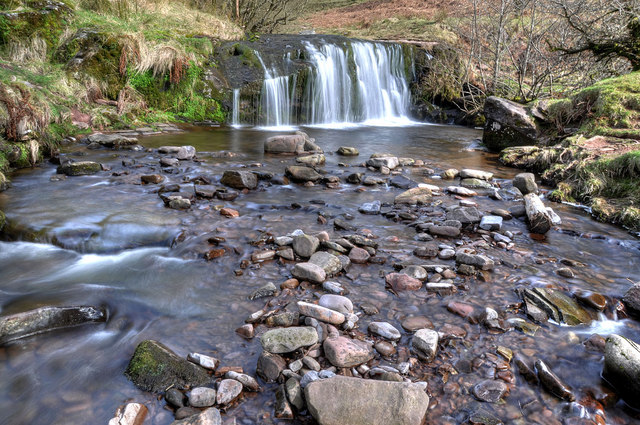
- Waterfall on the Caerfanell at Blaen y Glyn

- Location within Wales

Location
- Country: Wales
- County: Powys

Physical characteristics
- Source
  - location: Gwaun Cerrig Llwydion
- Mouth: River Usk
  - location: Llansantffraed
  - coordinates: 51.89058°N 3.2971°W

The Caerfanell (Welsh pronunciation: [kai̯rˈvanɛɬ]) is a river which rises in the central section of the Brecon Beacons National Park in Powys, Wales. It rises as Blaen Caerfanell on the plateau of Gwaun Cerrig Llwydion and drops steeply down south-eastwards into the head of Glyn Collwn before turning east then north-east into Talybont Reservoir. It emerges from the hydro turbine beneath the dam just above the village of Aber and continues northwards to its confluence with the River Usk at the hamlet of Llansantffraed.

Its principal tributaries are the Nant Bwrefwr, Nant Tarthwynni, Clydach and Cwy.

== Access ==
The river is shadowed for much of its length by the Beacons Way and by the eastern loop of the Taff Trail. Its uppermost reaches are within open country and accessible to walkers. Paths accompany the river at Blaen y Glyn where it and its tributary the Bwrefwr, drop over a series of falls which are a very popular natural attraction during both summer and winter months.
