= Usk Valley Walk =

Long-distance footpath in south Wales

The Usk Valley Walk is a waymarked long distance footpath in south east Wales, from Caerleon to Brecon.

== Distance ==
The route runs some 48 miles (77 km). The entire route can be walked in three to five days.

== The route ==
The route follows some of the course of the River Usk and runs from a start point at Caerleon, not far upstream from the rivermouth at Uskmouth, south of Newport, up the river valley, with interesting detours, to Brecon in the north.

It passes from Roman Caerleon uphill, climbing the Wentwood ridge, to descend into gentle dairy pastureland , visiting the riverside towns of Usk and Abergavenny, where it enters the Brecon Beacons National Park, follows the towpath of the Monmouthshire and Brecon Canal, bypassing Crickhowell where it climbs again providing views of the Black Mountains falling back to the canal towpath again. Just after Llangynidr it climbs again towards Talybont Reservoir with fine views of the highest part of the Brecon Beacons on the way. Passing below the reservoir the route climbs towards Talybont Forest rejoining the canal at Pencelli. The route ends at Brecon.

The route is waymarked using a symbol of an otter's head, an animal that any walker may well see on the river. A guidebook for the route is available from bookshops.

More adventurous walkers can follow further up the River Usk towards its source in the Carmarthenshire Fans below Fan Brycheiniog in the west of the National Park.
