= Nant Brân =

River in Powys, Wales

Coordinates: 51°57′13″N 3°28′33″W

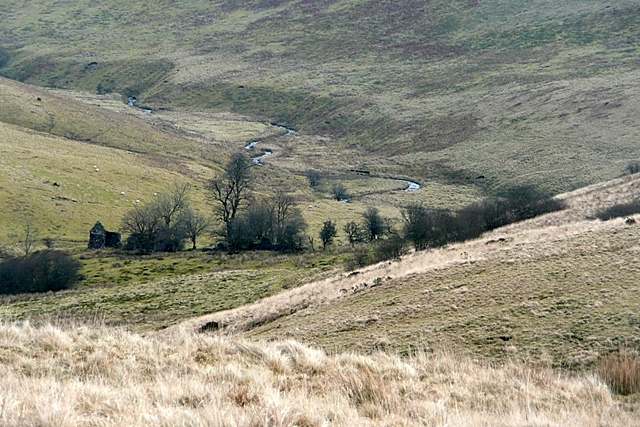

The Nant Brân is a short river which rises on the southern slopes of Mynydd Epynt in Powys, Wales. The word 'brân' means 'crow' in Welsh: the name may therefore allude to the dark colour of its waters.

Its upper reaches are within the military training area of SENTA, the British Army's Sennybridge Training Area. It flows through the hamlet of Llanfihangel Nant Brân en route to its confluence with the River Usk at Aberbrân, three miles west of Brecon. Along with other tributaries of the Usk, the Nant Brân has been designated as a special area of conservation for various fish amongst which are three species of lamprey, the twaite shad and the European bullhead.
