= Berthin Brook =

Coordinates: 51°42′38″N 2°54′34″W

The Berthin Brook is a minor right bank tributary of the River Usk in Monmouthshire, in south Wales. Flowing north from New Inn initially, it turns east at Little Mill to flow along a former glacial meltwater channel past the former Royal Ordnance Factory site (now BAE Systems) at Glascoed and by Rhadyr to join the major river 1 km north of the town of Usk. At the height of the last ice age (the Devensian), the Usk valley glacier reached as far down the Usk valley as Little Mill and sediment-laden meltwater created a valley sandur over which the post-glacial Berthin Brook now flows.
