= River Haffes =

River in Powys, Wales

Coordinates: 51.8345°N 3.6757°W

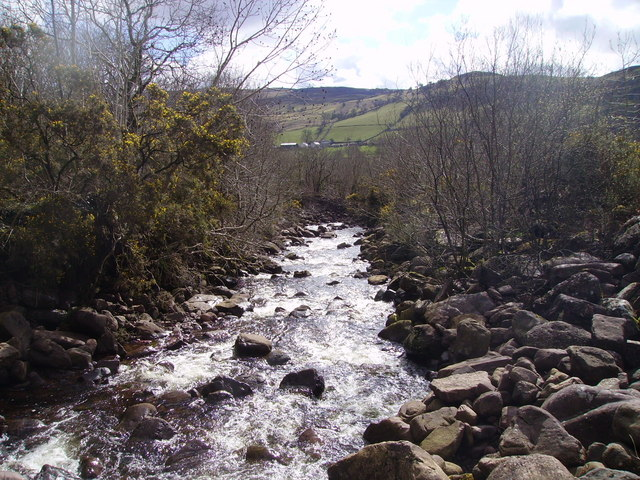
The Haffes near Glyntawe

The Afon Haffes is a river in Powys, Wales and is wholly contained within the Brecon Beacons National Park (Welsh: Parc Cenedlaethol Bannau Brycheiniog).

Its headwaters rise on the southern and western slopes of Fan Hir at the eastern edge of the Black Mountain (Y Mynydd Du) and the river joins the River Tawe at Glyntawe after a short and steep south-eastward descent of 3 km / 2 miles.

Cwm Haffes is a trench which has been incised into the glacial till left by the glaciers of the last ice age along the geological boundary between the Old Red Sandstone rocks to the north and the Carboniferous Limestone rocks to the south. At the head of the incised valley is Sgwd Ddu (Welsh for 'black fall').

The river forms two distributaries as it enters the River Tawe on account of its large bedload of boulders derived from the glacial material through which it has cut.
