= Aman River (Rhondda Cynon Taf) =

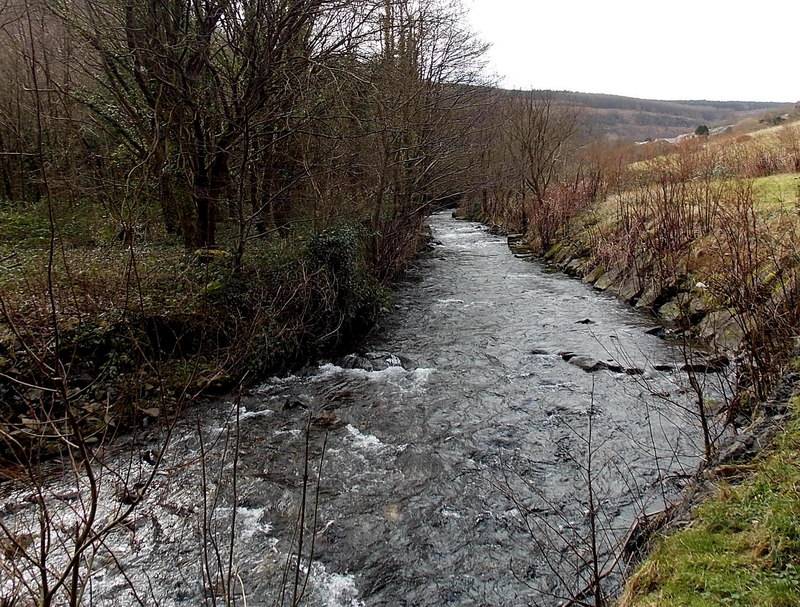
- The Aman River near the Falcon Inn, between Cwmaman and Godreaman, Aberaman.
- Native name: Afon Aman (Welsh)

Location
- Country: Wales
- County borough: Rhondda Cynon Taf

Physical characteristics
- Source confluence: Nant Aman Fach, Nant Aman Fawr and the Sychnant
- Mouth: River Cynon
  - location: Aberaman
  - coordinates: 51°42′03″N 3°25′11″W

The Aman River in Rhondda Cynon Taf, South Wales, is a tributary of the River Cynon.

== Course ==
At Cwmaman it is formed by the confluence of various streams including the Nant Aman Fach (from the north west), the Nant Aman Fawr (from the west) and the Sychnant (from the south). From Cwmaman it flows north-east for about 2.5 km or 1.5 miles, passing Godreaman and Aberaman, to a confluence with the River Cynon.

During the development of the Fforchaman Colliery, the parts of the river on the site were progressively culverted, with the culverted sections measuring a total 2,300 feet (700 m) in length. In the 1960s, following the colliery's closure the surrounding land around the culverts was landscaped into common ground.
