= Olway Brook =

Coordinates: 51°40′36″N 2°53′11″W

Olway Brook just upstream from its confluence with the River Usk, viewed from the Usk Valley Walk

The Olway Brook (Welsh: Nant Olwy) is a left bank tributary of the River Usk in Monmouthshire in south Wales. Arising from the confluence of several brooks in the vicinity of Llansoy including the Llangofen, Penarth and Pontyrhydan brooks, it flows west to Llandenny, where it is joined by the Nant y Wilcae from Raglan, then southwest to be joined by the waters of the Pill brook and Llan-gwm-isaf Brook. Approaching the edge of the town of Usk it does not join the River Usk here but flows south, sub-parallel to the major river for over 3 km before joining it 750m south of the hamlet of Llanllowell. The catchment of the brook is almost wholly Old Red Sandstone.
