= Afon Crawnon =

River in Powys, Wales

Coordinates: 51°52′08″N 3°14′39″W

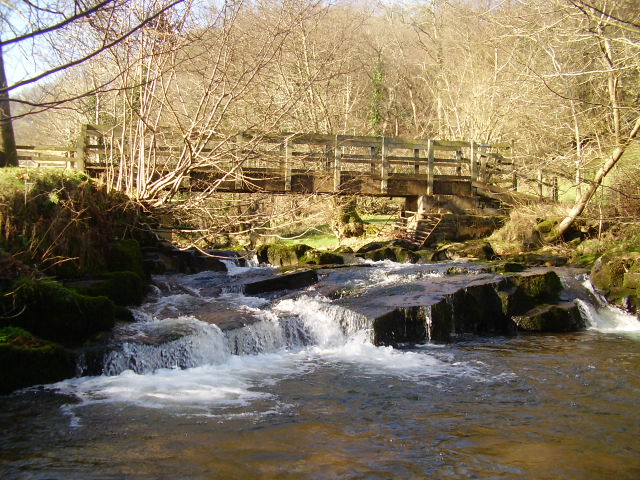
Footbridge over Afon Crawnon

The Afon Crawnon is a river in the Brecon Beacons National Park in the county of Powys, Wales. The headwaters rise on the hills north of Trefil and flow northeast down a valley known as Dyffryn Crawnon for 7 km to a confluence with the River Usk just west of Llangynidr. The valley is notable for being at the centre of a major green energy initiative known as The Three Green Valleys project and which involves the construction of several micro-hydro schemes. Dyffryn Crawnon is translated from Welsh to mean "Valley of the Garlic River".

== Geology ==
The river flows through a valley carved into the mudstones and sandstones of the Old Red Sandstone laid down during the Devonian period.

== Access ==
The public road up the valley is effectively a cul-de-sac though numerous footpaths and bridleways climb up the sides of the valley from it. However, a vehicular impassable Restricted Byway (Road used as Public Path) connects to an equally difficult in law Right of way at the end of the valley, suspected to be the original line of the Brinore Tramroad. The Beacons Way skirts the northern edge of Dyffryn Crawnon.
