= Afon Twrch, Carmarthenshire =

River in Carmarthenshire, Wales

Coordinates: 52.0459°N 3.9624°W

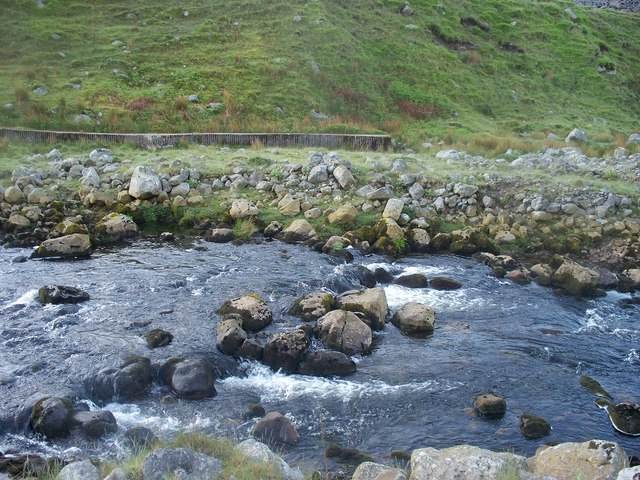
Afon Twrch

The Afon Twrch is a short river in Carmarthenshire, West Wales. It joins the River Cothi (itself a right bank tributary of the River Towy) at the village of Pumsaint, near to which are the Roman gold mines of Dolaucothi.
