= Gwenffrwd, Towy =

River in Carmarthenshire, Wales

The Gwenffrwd is a right-bank tributary of the River Towy in northern Carmarthenshire, mid Wales. It rises to the east of Carn Nant-yr-ast and flows in a generally southeasterly direction to its confluence with the Towy, 1 mile to the northwest of the village of Rhandirmwyn. Its only significant tributary is the Nant Melyn which enters on its right-bank.
