= River Usk =

River in Wales

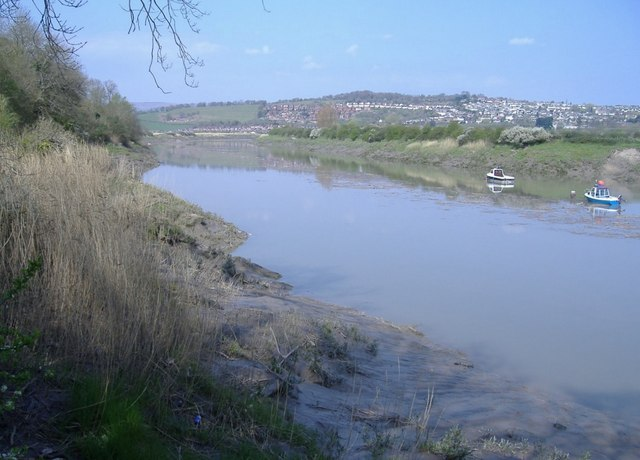
- Looking north across the river, near Newport, towards Caerleon

- Route of the Usk
- Native name: Afon Wysg (Welsh)

Location
- Country: Wales
- County: Powys, Carmarthenshire, Monmouthshire, Newport

Physical characteristics
- Source
  - location: Fan Brycheiniog, Carmarthenshire / Powys, Wales
  - coordinates: 51°54′3″N 3°43′19″W
  - elevation: 502 m (1,647 ft)
- Mouth: Severn Estuary
  - location: Uskmouth, Newport, Wales
  - coordinates: 51°32′31″N 2°59′6″W
  - elevation: 0 m (0 ft)
- Length: 125 km (78 mi)
- Basin size: 1,160 km^{2} (450 sq mi)
- Discharge
  - location: Chain Bridge (Usk) for 1957-2012
  - average: 27.919 m^{3}/s (986.0 cu ft/s)for 1957-2012
  - minimum: 1.58 m^{3}/s (56 cu ft/s)on 27 Aug 2003
  - maximum: 585.4 m^{3}/s (20,670 cu ft/s)on 27 Dec 1979

Basin features
- Tributaries
  - left: Cilieni, Nant Brân, Ysgir, Honddu, Rhiangoll, Grwyne Fawr, Gavenny, Olway Brook
  - right: Hydfer, Crai, Senni, Tarell, Cyrig, Nant Menasgin, Caerfanell, Crawnon, Clydach, Berthin Brook, Sôr Brook, Llwyd, Ebbw

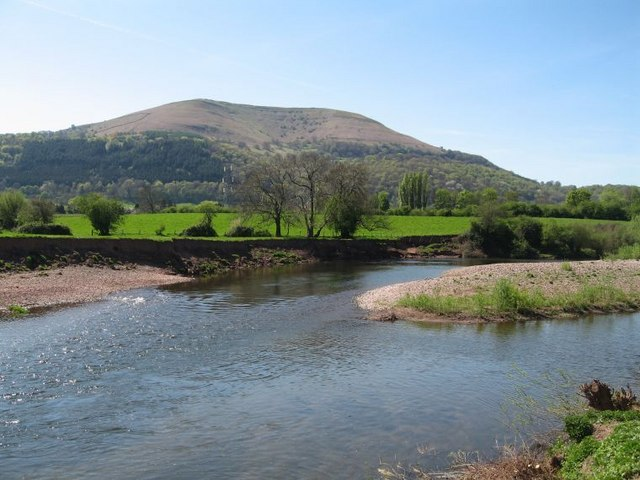
The River Usk near Abergavenny with the Blorenge in the background

The River Usk (/ʌsk/; Welsh: Afon Wysg) is a river in south Wales that rises on the northern slopes of the Black Mountain range, in the western part of the Brecon Beacons National Park, and flows into the Severn Estuary at Uskmouth after flowing through Brecon, Crickhowell, Abergavenny, Usk, Caerleon, and Newport.

The river is 125 kilometres (78 miles) long and drains a basin of 1,160 km^{2} (450 sq mi). The Encyclopaedia of Wales, which gives its length as 137 km (85 mi), describes it as the longest river flowing wholly within Wales. Its name derives from a Common Brittonic word meaning "abounding in fish", or possibly "water".

It is designated a Site of Special Scientific Interest. Its habitats include woodland, grassland, marshes, mudflats and salt marshes. The river supports Atlantic salmon, brown trout, European otters, twait shad, and lampreys. The Usk has long been noted as a salmon and trout fishing river.

The Usk valley has been an important route for settlement and trade since prehistoric times, while the river's navigable tidal reaches connected inland south-east Wales with the Severn Estuary and the Bristol Channel. The Usk is crossed by numerous historic bridges, including several listed ones and the Newport Transporter Bridge. The river features in medieval Welsh and Arthurian literature, including the works of Geoffrey of Monmouth.

== Etymology ==
The name of the river derives from a Common Brittonic word meaning "abounding in fish" (or possibly "water"); this root also appears in other British river names such as Exe, Axe, Esk and other variants. The name is cognate with pysg (plural of pysgod), the Welsh word for fish, borrowed from Latin piscis.

The name of the river appears as "Wÿsk" on the Cambriae Typus map of 1573.

== Ecology ==
The whole river has been designated a Site of Special Scientific Interest. It has an estuary with mudflats and salt marsh, lagoons, bog and marsh, varied grassland and woodland habitats along its course. Its flora and fauna are diverse and include Atlantic salmon, European otters, twait shad, shad, lamprey, European perch, brown trout, chub, common dace and common roach, as well as kingfishers, grey herons and other wildfowl and bird life. Dippers can be seen upriver along with red kites in the river's valley upstream from around the town of Usk.

The Usk has long been a noted salmon and trout fishing river. Salmon of over 30 pounds (14 kg) may still be caught. In 1999 the river had the highest estimated salmon egg deposition of any river south of Cumbria and the Scottish rivers, and exceeded its spawning target. The river has recently been rated as the best fly fishing water in Wales for salmon and inside the UK Top Ten.

The normal tidal limit of the river is just below the bridge at Newbridge-on-Usk, some 5 miles (8.0 km) north of Newport.

== Bridge crossings ==
- List of crossings of the River Usk

There are numerous bridge crossings of the river, variously for vehicles, pedestrians and rail traffic. A number are of historic interest, notably a series of largely eighteenth- and nineteenth-century listed structures between Abercamlais and Newport.

=== Upper valley ===
The highest crossing is that of Pont ar Wysg (translates from Welsh as bridge on the Usk) which carries the moorland road west from Trecastle to Twynllanan. There are a further couple of minor road crossings below the Usk Reservoir dam around Cwmwysg, then Pont Newydd (translates as new bridge) immediately south of Trecastle. In the vicinity of Sennybridge are Pont Pantysgallog, Pont Ynysyrwyddfa, Pont Senni (after which the village is named) and Pont Llwyncyntefin. Pont y Commin is of interest insofar as a former railway bridge carried the Neath and Brecon Railway at a high level diagonally over the road bridge itself. Three historic bridges span the river in quick succession: a pedestrian suspension bridge at Abercamlais and stone arch bridges at Abercamlais and Penpont (both Grade II* listed), with Aberbrân bridge another 1.5 miles (2.4 km) downstream.

The Grade I listed Usk Bridge in Brecon dates back to 1563 but it was significantly altered in the 1950s to accommodate increased road traffic. It is supplemented by a modern concrete span bridge carrying the A40 Brecon bypass dual carriageway over the river to the east of the town. Another 1.5 miles (2.4 km) miles downstream is Lock Bridge, which carries the B4558 over the river, and immediately downstream again is the substantial Brynich Aqueduct carrying the Monmouthshire and Brecon Canal over the river at Llanfrynach. There was another pair of bridges at Llansantffraed but since the dismantling of the railway bridge only the road bridge linking to Talybont-on-Usk remains. A couple of private footbridges span the next section of the river before its waters pass beneath the historic (Grade I listed) Llangynidr Bridge.

Tower Bridge is a Grade II* listed structure providing private vehicular access into Glanusk Park, the river then remaining unbridged downstream until the historic (Grade I listed) Crickhowell Bridge. At Glangrwyney is a bailey bridge installed after the earlier stone bridge was washed away, though there was once a chain ferry crossing of the river near Llanwenarth as the nearby Boat Farm testifies.

=== Abergavenny to Newbridge ===
The next bridge is that at Abergavenny connecting the town with Llanfoist. This Grade II* listed structure was accompanied on its upstream side by a railway bridge from the 1860s until the railway's closure in the late 1950s. Abergavenny is bypassed to the south by the A465 dual carriageway which crosses the river west of the Hardwicke roundabout. The bridge which carries the A4042 road over the river at Llanellen was built by John Upton in 1821.

A private footbridge spans the river at Llanover and the mainline railway crosses it at The Bryn, a small village otherwise known as Llangattock Nigh Usk. The B4598 road is carried over the river by another Upton legacy, the Grade II* listed Pant-y-Goitre Bridge near Llanvihangel Gobion, and again by the 'Chain Bridge' near Kemeys Commander (the name of this iron arch structure is a hangover from the previous bridge which was supported by chains). The river is crossed by two bridges at Usk, the former railway crossing and, downstream, the Usk Bridge carrying the A472 road and the Usk Valley Walk. Yet another Grade II* listed structure, it was built by William Edwards in the late 1740s. A long unbridged section follows until, just upstream from the normal tidal limit on the Usk, it is crossed by the Grade II* listed New Bridge at Newbridge-on-Usk, probably also a legacy of Edwards from 1779.

=== Newport ===
There are thirteen crossings within the boundaries of the city of Newport. The Twenty Ten Bridge is a recently constructed private bridge upstream of Caerleon giving access to one of the golf courses associated with Celtic Manor. In Caerleon itself the B4236 road crosses by means of Caerleon Bridge dating from 1806. Downstream are two rail crossings, upstream and downstream of the M4 motorway crossing which comprises two independent structures carrying the east and westbound carriageways over the river together with two further structures carrying the A4042 slip roads forming a part of junction 25a of the motorway.

Newport Bridge, often known as Town Bridge, carries the B4591 immediately downstream of the second railway crossing, with Newport Castle between them. Newport City footbridge was opened in 2006 to carry both pedestrians and cyclists over the river as part of an urban regeneration project. Just downriver is George Street Bridge carrying the B4237 road across, and downstream again is City Bridge carrying the A48 dual carriageway across. Newport Transporter Bridge is the furthest downstream of the many crossings of the Usk. Completed in 1906, it is one of fewer than 10 such structures remaining in use across the world and, at just short of 200 metres (660 ft), is the longest of these.

== Former mills ==
There are a number of former watermills along the banks of the river, the majority of which were engaged in milling corn for flour production. The uppermost mill on the Usk was that at Cwm-wysg, a corn mill of mediaeval origin at Ordnance Survey grid reference SN 849285. Watergate Mill at Brecon (SO 435285) was another cornmill making use of water from the Usk, though post-mediaeval in date. A couple of miles downstream was Millbrook Mill at Llanhamlach (SO 084268). This drew water via a 42m long leat from an 85m long weir spanning the width of the river. Buckland Old Mill, upstream of Llangynidr (at SO 134201), is thought to have been another post-mediaeval cornmill.

Three further mills sit close to the banks of the Usk between here and Crickhowell, though all draw their water from tributaries rather than the main river. Aberhoyw Mill takes water from the Nant Cleisfer, while Knight's Cornmill at Tretower takes water via a 440-metre (1,440 ft) long leat from the Rhiangoll, and Usk Vale Mill at Glangrwyney draws its water from the Grwyne Fawr. The first two are post-mediaeval cornmills, the latter a nineteenth-century paper mill which was later converted to become a ‘sawdust mill’. Forge Mill, north of Bettws Newydd at SO 355974, was still in use at the end of the nineteenth century, using a 200-metre (660 ft) long weir stretching between islands on the river to draw its water. Gorrats Mill at Trostrey sits on the Usk's left bank at SO 359040. The possible 16th-century Prioress Mill (SO 367022) at Rhadyr, just north of the town of Usk, was another which, whilst close to the Usk, drew its water from a tributary, in this case the Berthin Brook.

In addition to these there is a leat beside the uppermost section of the river's course which is presumed to have drawn water off it at SN 816263 and transferred it via a contouring route across the moors for over 2 kilometres (1.2 mi). Its northern end is hidden within 20th-century woodland south of Usk Reservoir. Archaeologists have postulated it as being of either mediaeval or even Roman origin but do not know its purpose.

== In history and legend ==
The River Usk has played an important role in the history of Wales and features in some local folk-tales.

Historically, the tidal reaches of the Usk have been used as a major shipping port for much of the last millennium, mostly because of its wide and deep mouth, and good navigable access from the Severn Estuary and the Bristol Channel and thence access to home waters and further overseas.

Evidence of the Usk's long-standing use in transport and trade came in the form of the remains of the Newport Ship that were discovered in 2002. This ship, dated to around 1465, was most likely a trading vessel and may have sailed to Europe or even beyond.

The Usk has also played a role in many local legends. The Medieval Latin text De Ortu Waluuanii recounts a humorous tale in which an incognito Gawain pushes his uncle King Arthur into the Usk, and is then forced to explain to his wife Gwendoloena (Guinevere) why he is so wet.

Geoffrey of Monmouth writes of Caerleon in the mid 12th century:

For it was located in a delightful spot in Glamorgan, on the River Usk, not far from the Severn Sea. Abounding in wealth more than other cities, it was suited for such a ceremony. For the noble river I have named flows along it on one side, upon which the kings and princes who would be coming from overseas could be carried by ship.

— Geoffrey of Monmouth, Historia Regum Britanniae

"It is not until the 13th century French prose romances that Camelot began to supersede Caerleon, and even then, many descriptive details applied to Camelot derive from Geoffrey's earlier grand depiction of the Welsh town."

The Usk valley contains many sites of prehistorical archaeological significance and the valley has long been a trade route, settlement area and an avenue into Wales for successive invaders such as the Romans and Normans.

== See also ==
- List of rivers of Wales
- Usk Valley Walk
- List of bridges in Wales
