= River Honddu (Monmouthshire) =

River in south-east Wales

Coordinates: 51°54′17″N 2°58′02″W

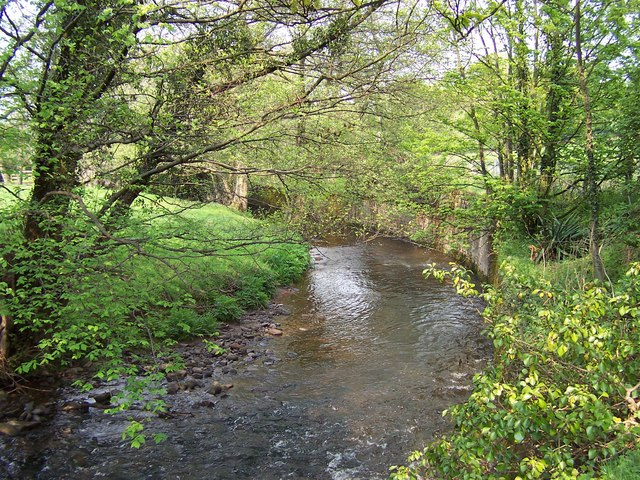
The Honddu near Pandy

The River Honddu (Welsh: Afon Honddu) (pronounced hon-thee) is a river in the Black Mountains within the Brecon Beacons National Park, southeast Wales. Early recorded versions of the name are of the form Hothenei and hodni which are believed to contain the adjective 'hawdd' meaning for example, pleasant or easy. Later forms such as Honddye have undergone metathesis whereby -ddn- became -ndd-. The river is over 24km in length.

It rises within the county of Powys near the Gospel Pass at the head of the Vale of Ewyas down which it flows, passing southwards into Monmouthshire to Llanvihangel Crucorney before turning northeastwards to join the River Monnow at the point on the Wales-England border where that river too makes a sudden change of direction. The only significant tributary to join the Honddu is the Nant Bwch though numerous smaller streams flow down the steep sides of the Vale of Ewyas to add to the river's flow.

It is likely that the Honddu continued on a southerly course beyond Llanvihangel Crucorney prior to the last ice age but has since been diverted by the presence of a large terminal moraine which stretches impressively across the valley to the west of the village. The southwest to northeast alignment of both the Honddu and the Monnow appear to be related to the course of the Neath Disturbance, an ancient geological weakness, which runs through the valley to the north of the Sugarloaf and on towards Hereford.

The upper valley of the Honddu has the characteristic U-shape of a glacially scoured valley though it is not clear where the ice originated that cut this deep trench through the eastern Black Mountains. The modern Honddu is thus something of a misfit river. It has been speculated that glacial ice from the Wye valley glacier invaded the Vale of Ewyas over the Gospel Pass, though no evidence of any glacial till containing clasts of rock from mid Wales has yet been found within the valley to support that proposal.

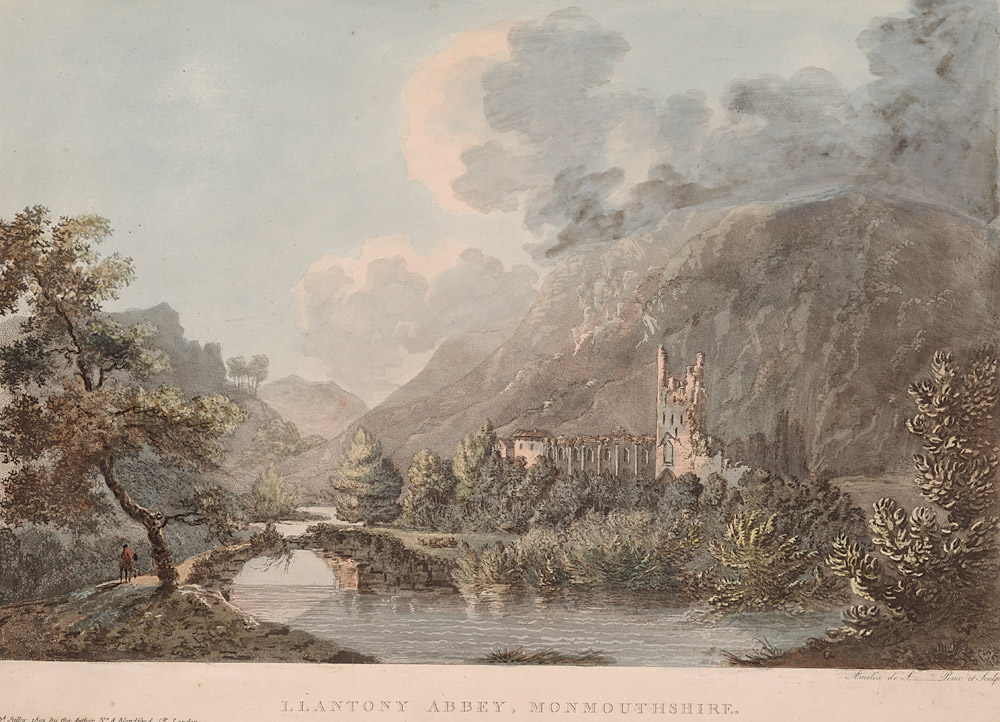
A view of the ruins of Llanthony Priory, with the Honddu in the foreground

Within the valley is Llanthony Priory, a popular attraction for the many visitors to the National Park. Towards the lower end of the Vale of Ewyas is Cwmyoy with its celebrated church, distorted by the movement of the hillside on which it stands; the entire hamlet has been built on an ancient, and not entirely dormant, landslide.
