= Afon Col-huw =

River in the Vale of Glamorgan, Wales

Coordinates: 51.39669°N 3.50039°W

Afon Col-huw River Colhuw
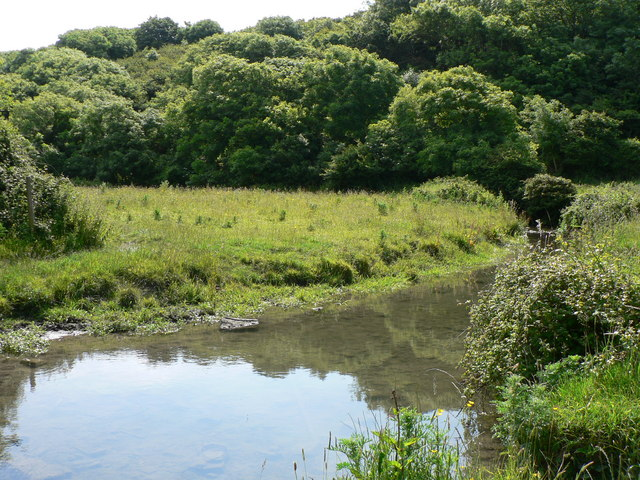
- Afon Col-huw south of Llantwit Major.

Location
- Country: United Kingdom, Wales
- Region: South Wales
- County: Vale of Glamorgan
- Cities: Llantwit Major, Llanmaes, Boverton

Physical characteristics
- Source
  - location: Southwest of Llantwit Major, Vale of Glamorgan, Vale of Glamorgan, Wales
- Length: 1.60 km (0.99 mi)
- Discharge
  - location: Col-huw Point, Vale of Glamorgan

Basin features
- Tributaries
  - left: Hoddnant
  - right: Ogney Brook

Afon Col-huw (also known as the River Colhuw, sometimes anglicised as Colhugh) is a very short river in Llantwit Major in the Vale of Glamorgan, south Wales. It is an exceptionally short river, one mile long, formed when two rivers, the Ogney Brook and the Hoddnant, converge south of Llantwit Major. Its valley, the Cwm Col-huw, is a Scheduled Ancient Monument - it was used in the Dig for Victory campaign in World War II.

== Ogney Brook ==
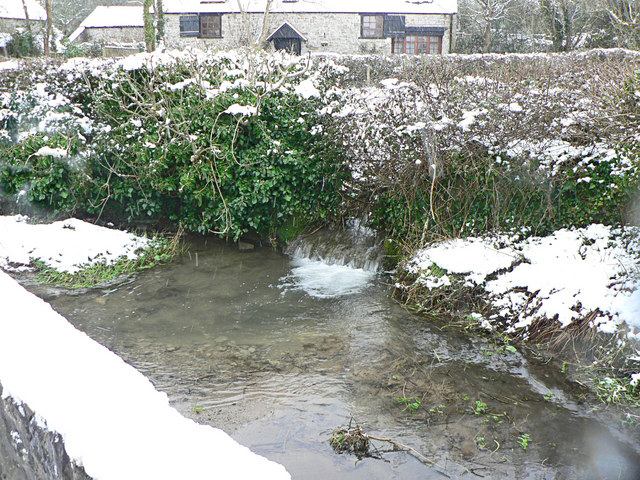
The Ogney Brook flows at Llantwit Major's western boundary.

The Ogney Brook is one of the two rivers that join to form the Col-huw. Its total length is just over a mile, flowing along the western fringe of Llantwit Major. Its source is northwest of the town. In 1998 the brook flooded, causing significant damage to nine properties and a pumping station.

== Hoddnant ==
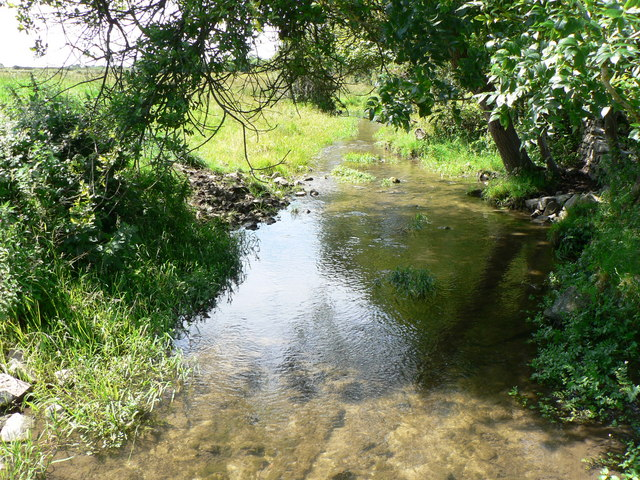
The Hoddnant near the village of Boverton

The Hoddnant is the larger of the Col-huw's tributaries. It is two miles long and is formed at Llanmaes, at the confluence of the Llanmaes Brook and the Boverton Brook. The Hoddnant's name was translated into English as the Merryvale, or Merry Brook.

=== Boverton Brook ===
The Boverton Brook is the smaller of the Hoddnant's two tributaries. It does not run through Boverton per se; by then it has merged with the Llanmaes Brook to form the Hoddnant. The Boverton Brook flooded significantly in the 1998 floods, causing damage on 31 October that year to twelve properties, including an electrical substation.

=== Llanmaes Brook ===
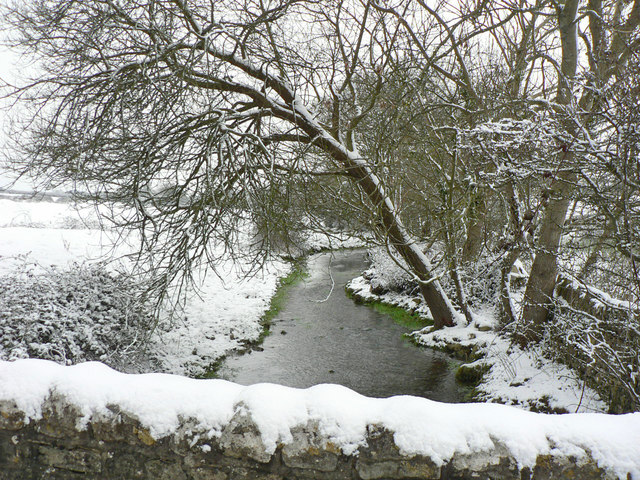
A photo of the Llanmaes Brook taken after snowfall.

The Llanmaes Brook is the longest section of the Col-huw watercourse. Its source is over a kilometre north of Llantwit Major. The Brook flows in a southeastern direction through the town of Llanmaes, joining the Boverton Brook by a railway in northeast Boverton. Like many other small Welsh rivers, the Llanmaes Brook caused damage and flooding in the 1998 floods; in Llanmaes seven properties were disrupted, and the floodwaters also caused havoc as they flooded the properties downstream. Areas of Llanmaes are still susceptible to flooding today.

== Mouth ==
The river meets the sea at Col-huw Point, where Llantwit Major beach is situated. At its mouth the river flows through the sand and stones of Llantwit beach. The mouth of the river was originally sandy, but dredging in the Bristol Channel and thus degradation of the Nash Bank, have meant that less and less sand lies around the estuary.

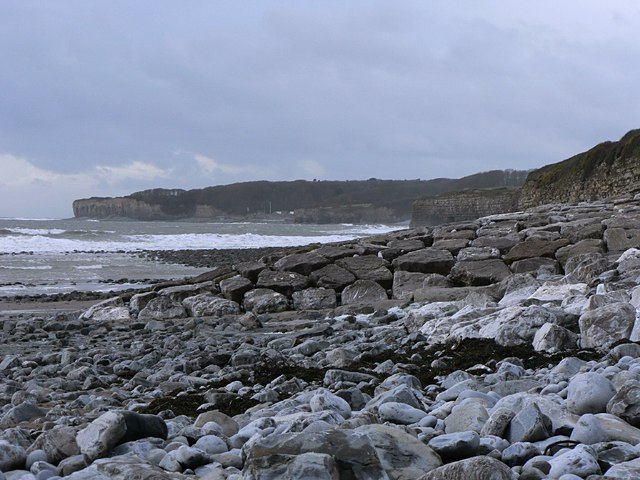
Defences to keep dissipating sand in place were installed at the river's mouth, which can be seen behind the boulders.

Remains of a small port have been discovered roughly 200 metres out to sea from the beach. It lay at the historical mouth of the Col-huw, like several other such settlements in South Wales. Radiocarbon dating of its remains have been dated as between 1400 and 1600. The port was destroyed when the surrounding land began eroding and receding. A flat area below the cliffs that went out a long way, but became submerged. It is assumed that due to this, the river, along which goods could be transported all the way upstream to Llantwit, silted up and became the mere stream it is today.
