= Hatterrall Hill =

Hill (531m) in Monmouthshire, Wales

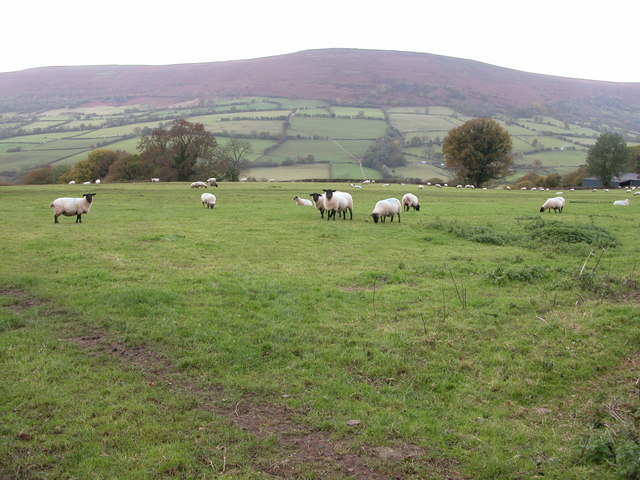
- Hatterrall Hill viewed from the east

Highest point
- Elevation: 531 m (1,742 ft)
- Prominence: 44 m (144 ft)
- Parent peak: Black Mountain
- Coordinates: 51°55′32″N 3°00′26″W

Geography
- Location within Wales Location within England Location within the United Kingdom
- Location: Wales-England border
- Parent range: Black Mountains
- OS grid: SO308256

Hatterrall Hill (Welsh: Mynydd Y Gader) is a rounded peak in the Black Mountains which sits on the Wales-England border, partly in Monmouthshire, Wales and partly in Herefordshire, England. Its summit at 531m is the high point of a peaty plateau which falls away steeply on all sides. Broad ridges run to the north, the southeast and southwest. To the north the ridge (known as Hatterrall Ridge) dips to a col at around 485m elevation before rising gradually over several kilometres towards Crib y Garth / Black Hill and Hay Bluff. The ridge to the southwest ends abruptly at the sheer cliff known as the Darren below which is a considerable landslip area extending south to the hamlet of Cwmyoy with its mis-shapen church. The Welsh part of the hill falls within the Brecon Beacons National Park.

== Access ==
The upper parts of Hatterrall Hill are all designated as open country and so are freely accessible to walkers. Several public footpaths and other public rights of way give access onto the open land from the Vale of Ewyas (Llanthony Valley) to the west and from the Monnow valley to the east. The Offa's Dyke Path long distance trail runs from north to south over the hill as does the Beacons Way.

== Geology ==
The hill is composed from sandstones and mudstones of the Senni Beds Formation of the Old Red Sandstone which is of Devonian age. Numerous small quarries adorn its slopes though all are now abandoned. The Vale of Ewyas was occupied by glaciers during the ice ages though the plateau was probably ice-free.
