= Ewias =

Welsh medieval cantref and legendary kingdom

Ewias or Ewyas was a possible early Welsh kingdom which may have been formed around the time of the Roman withdrawal from Britain in the 5th century. The name was later used for a much smaller commote or administrative sub-division, which covered the area of the modern Vale of Ewyas (now within Monmouthshire, Wales) and a larger area to the east, including the villages of Ewyas Harold and Ewyas Lacy (now within Herefordshire, England).

== A legendary kingdom ==
Some researchers interpret the evidence of the medieval Llandaff charters to suggest that early Ewias may have encompassed much of south-east Wales, including the later kingdoms of Gwent and Ergyng. However, these sources are open to several interpretations, and mainstream historians do not generally accept this. Geoffrey of Monmouth gives the legend of Octavius (Welsh: Eudaf), "earl of Ewyias and Ergyng," in his famous pseudo-history Historia Regum Britanniae, making him a descendant of Caratacus, who had led the Silures in battle against the Romans. According to Geoffrey, he took up a supposed "British High Kingship" after defeating Trahern, the brother of King Coel Godhebog, in the late third or early fourth century. No historical evidence to corroborate this, and Coel's reign in the Hen Ogledd is usually placed in the 5th century. In the Welsh versions of the Historia, such as Brut Dingestow, Octavius is called Eudaf; this is the same legendary figure that appears in Breuddwyd Macsen Wledig as father of Elen, wife of Macsen Wledig, and living near Segontium in north Wales.

An 8th-century charter relating to the church at Clodock includes an account of its origin when Clydawg, "king in Ewyias," was murdered while on a hunting expedition, and an oratory was built to commemorate his martyrdom.

== Cantref ==
Whatever the origins of Ewias may be, north of the present site of Longtown, a religious centre dedicated to St Beuno was founded at Llanveynoe, where what is probably the oldest stone cross in the modern county of Herefordshire stands, from around 600 AD. Around the same time, a religious centre may have been founded at Llanthony, on the site of the later Priory. In the mid-10th century, there were seven cantrefs in Glamorgan, including "Ystradyw and Ewias".

== Lordship ==
In about 1046, Osbern Pentecost, a Norman follower of Edward the Confessor, built a motte and bailey castle at Ewyas Harold, believed to be one of the first built in Britain. Following the Norman Conquest, Ewias remained in Welsh hands briefly under Rhydderch ap Caradog, apparently a client ruler of Ewias, obeisant to William the Conqueror. It was then granted to the Norman retainer Walter de Lacy

By the time of the Domesday Book in 1086, Ewyas or Ewias was an autonomous area bounded by the Black Mountains in the west, Graig Syfyrddin in the south, the line of the Golden Valley in the east, and Yager Hill and Cefn Hill to the north, just below the village of Clifford Castle near Hay-on-Wye. Domesday records that Alfred of Marlborough held the castle of Ewias from the king, presumably the rebuilt Pentecost Castle. The land around Ewyas Harold Castle was held by Walter's son, Roger de Lacy.

Ewias became a Marcher lordship, largely independent of the English crown. Further motte and bailey castles were built at Walterstone, Llancillo, Rowlestone and Clodock, followed after 1216 by Longtown Castle, presiding over the newly founded borough of Longtown. The line of de Lacys ended in 1241, when the Lordship of Ewyas Lacy was divided.

== Into Herefordshire and Monmouthshire ==
In 1536, the administration of Wales was reorganised, and the border between Herefordshire and Wales took more or less its present form, with the county of Herefordshire assimilating the Welsh territory of Ewias Lacy. The Llanthony valley, or Vale of Ewyas, became part of the hundred of Abergavenny, within Monmouthshire. In 1852, the Parishes of Clodock with Longtown, Michaelchurch Escley, Craswall, St Margaret's, Ewias Harold, Rowlestone, Llancillo, Walterstone, Dulas and Llanveynoe were transferred from the Diocese of St Davids to that of Hereford. To the west of Hatterrall Ridge, the other old parishes of Ewias – Llanthony, Cwmyoy and Oldcastle were transferred from St Davids to the diocese of Llandaff.
