= On the Black Hill =

1982 novel by Bruce Chatwin

- First edition
- Author: Bruce Chatwin
- Language: English
- Publisher: Jonathan Cape
- Publication date: 1982
- Publication place: United Kingdom
- Media type: Print (hardback & paperback)
- Pages: 256
- ISBN: 978-0-224-01980-4
- OCLC: 8887933
- Dewey Decimal: 823/.914 19
- LC Class: PR6053.H395 O5 1982b

On the Black Hill is a novel by Bruce Chatwin published in 1982 and winner of the James Tait Black Memorial Prize for that year. In 1987 it was made into a film, directed by Andrew Grieve.

== Plot ==
The novel's setting is the border of Herefordshire, in England, and Radnorshire, in Wales. In the early pages we are told the border runs through the very farmhouse:

The border of Radnor and Hereford was said to run right through the middle of the staircase.

The central characters are Welshmen, with the surname Jones.

The story is told through the technique of flashback, and portrays the lives of twin brothers, Lewis and Benjamin Jones, on their isolated upland farm called The Vision. The twins develop a bond that is shown throughout the novel as very special. Lewis is portrayed as the stronger or dominant twin, whereas Benjamin is the more intuitive one, both in appearance and in the tasks which he does around the house. He seems to be constantly drawn to his mother's side while she is alive.

Lewis is the one who wants to break free but Benjamin is forced into the army at the time of the Great War. His efforts are frustrated by his family ties and the indefinable, unbreakable tie to the land. Chatwin also tells the reader of the brutality involved in farming at the time in this area. Amos, the father of the twins, shows how his day-to-day job has brutalised his once caring and loving attitude, and we see this later in the novel when he hits his wife Mary on the temple with the book she is reading – Wuthering Heights. A jealous man, Amos attacks his wife with the very material that shows her intelligence; he feels threatened by this, feeling that the man is supposed to be the head of the family in all things, and he feels anger because of his limited education.

On the Black Hill is a novel which portrays themes such as unrequited love, sexual repression and confusion, social, religious and cultural repression, hate and the historic social values of that era, as is shown when Amos finds out that his daughter Rebecca has become pregnant by an Irishman. His religious fanaticism, social pressure, economic forces and an inability to express love results in him throwing her out of the household, and she is not mentioned in the novel again until the latter part. The novel can also be seen as Chatwin's autobiografictional utopia, in which each of the twins represents one of the author's bisexual subject positions.

== Characters ==
- Sam 'the Wagon' Jones – the main character's paternal grandfather. He lived with the family, enjoys playing the violin.
- Hannah Jones – Sam's wife. Hostile to her daughter-in-law. She had five children (a daughter who died of consumption, another daughter who married a Catholic, the eldest son died in a Rhondda coalpit and her favourite son, Eddie, stole her savings and fled to Canada. She was left living with Amos).
- Amos Jones – Main characters' father. Marries the local preacher's daughter after her father died and rents the farm The Vision, where the majority of the story takes place. Died from being kicked by a horse.
- Mary Jones (née Latimer). Daughter of a preacher. She is well educated and well travelled. She has spent time in India. After her father died she needed to marry to support herself, so she married Amos, a local farm boy. They have three children, twin sons and then a daughter.
- Lewis Jones – Twin with Benjamin, son of Mary and Amos.
- Benjamin Jones – Twin with Lewis, son of Mary and Amos.
- Rebecca Jones – daughter of Mary and Amos Jones. Amos doted on her daughter until she ran off with an Irish Catholic and moved to America.
- Jim 'the Rock' Watkins – A boy around the same age as the twins, lives next door on a farm called The Rock.
- Tom 'the Coffin' Watkins – Local coffin-maker. Jim's father and married to Aggie Watkins. Has an ongoing feud with Amos. Left the family after a fight with his son, leaving Aggie and Jim to run the farm alone.
- Aggie Watkins – Married to Tom, has a son Jim and daughter Ethel. After Tom disappears, she took in illegitimate children to raise for money.
- Ethel Watkins – She has a son called Alfie, who is 'simple' and dies in childhood in a local bog.
- Rosie Fifield – Lewis has a crush on her as they were childhood playmates. She instead decides to pursue Reggie Bickerton, who has recently returned from the war, he is from a local aristocratic family and wealthy. She begins working for him, he seduces her and proposes but refuses to tell his family or marry her, leaving her when she becomes pregnant. She has a son called Billy. She is offered £400 to go away and goes to live in a remote farm with her child.
- Reggie Bickerton – local aristocrat, injured in WWI, seduced Rosie who was working as his nurse and helper. He ran away to his plantation abroad after impregnating her.
- Gladys Musker – Widow, has a daughter called Lilly-Annie. Her mother is Mrs Yapp. She later has an illegitimate daughter Meg (Margaret Beatrice Musker). Lewis has a crush on Gladys.
- Mr Haines – He seduced Gladys Musker, and is thought to be the father of Meg. He wouldn't marry her but after the baby is born he wants to be involved, he stalks her and eventually shoots her with a shotgun and then kills himself.
- Margaret 'Meg' Beatrice Musker – Gladys' daughter. Father unknown, might be Mr Haines or Jim the Rock. She goes to live with Aggie Watkins and Jim when her mother dies.
- Joy and Nigel Lambert, married artists renting a cottage in the area. Nigel is making some etchings of Benjamin for a series of poems about a year as a shepherd. Joy takes an interest in Lewis Jones and seduces him, before she moves away.
- Mr Arkwright – the local solicitor, he kills his wife with cyanide. He is subsequently hanged for the crime.

== Location ==
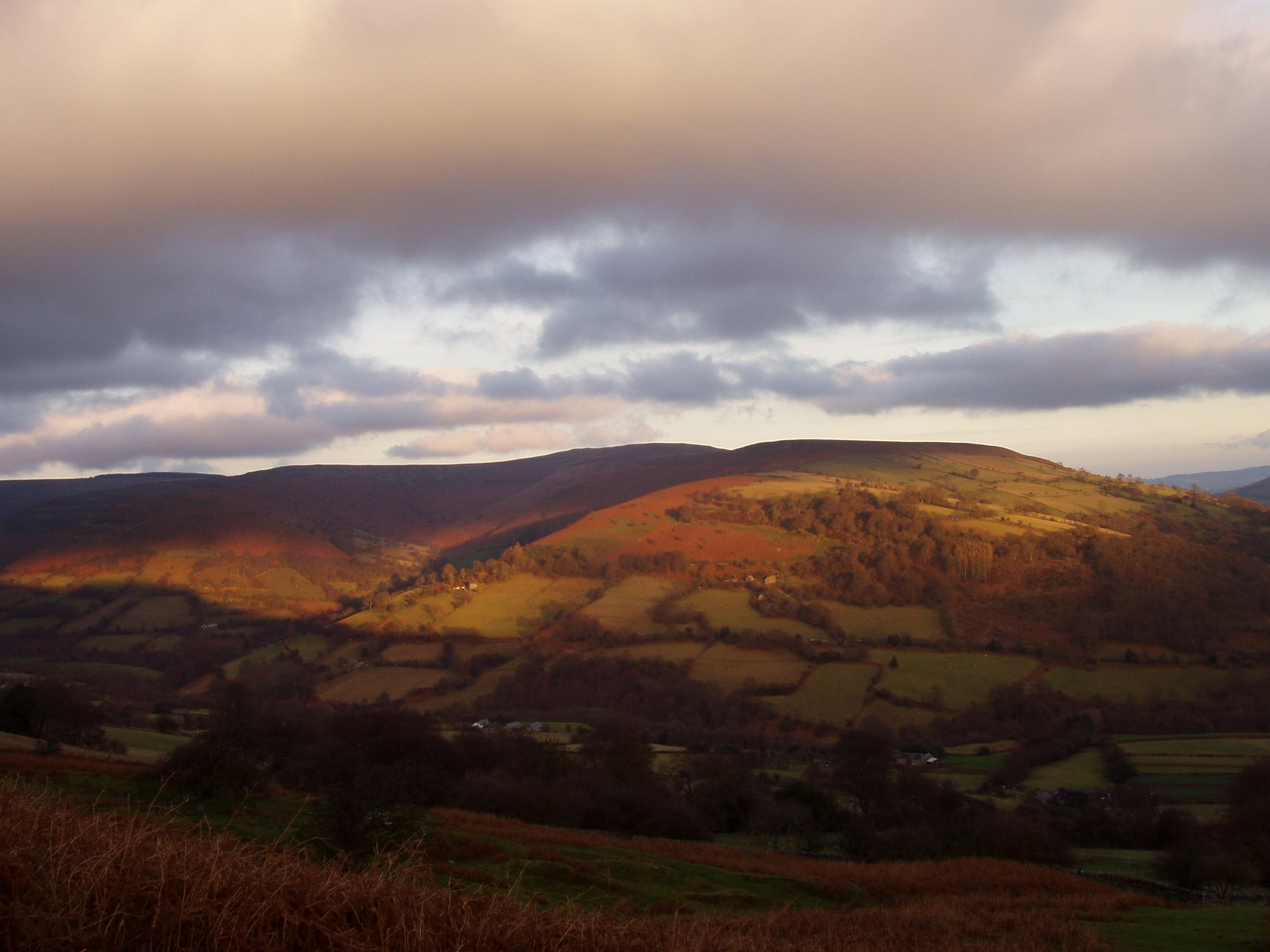
The southern part of the Grwyne Fechan valley in the Black Mountains

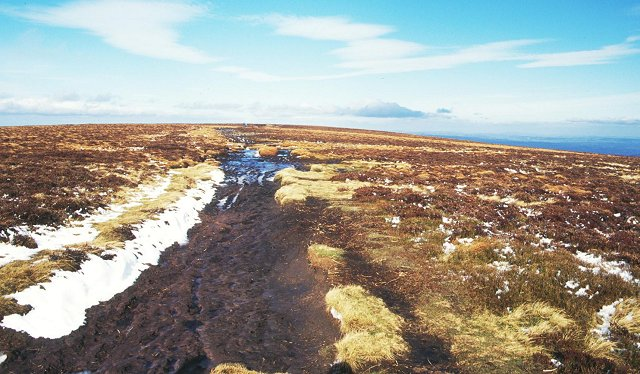
The summit of the Black Mountain crossed by the Offa's Dyke Path

The location is lightly fictionalised; The Vision is a real farm north of Llanthony. Many real place names are used, the great majority indicating a site on the border of Herefordshire and Brecknockshire south of Hay on Wye. The Herefordshire Black Hill and Cefn Hill are outliers of the Black Mountains; Brecknockshire was west of the easternmost ridge of the Black Mountains to the west. Hay-on-Wye (with its castle and pre-war railway station) would be the principal town in the area but its name is notable by its absence; instead, it seems the name of the Radnorshire hamlet of Rhulen has been used. The name of the Shropshire location of Lurkenhope has been used for the principal village. Talgarth, although not mentioned in the film, is another small nearby town, which would have been of greater importance to the area at the time.

On the Ordnance Survey map, 'Abergavenny and the Black Mountains, Wales sheet 161' (1:50,000 series) and even better depicted on the more detailed 1:25,000 series at grid reference SO275348 the Black Hill itself is shown, towards Craswall. The name refers to a well known ridge descending very steeply from the long Hatterall Ridge (which forms the England / Wales border) and carries Offas Dyke footpath on it, down into the fields of Herefordshire, and on the English side. The Black Hill is known locally as 'The Cat's Back' as viewed from Herefordshire it looks like a crouching cat about to pounce. On the same map at grid reference SO264310, just a little to the south, is the real farm called The Vision, in the Llanthony valley, also known as the Vale of Ewyas, on the Welsh side of the border, just below Capel-y-ffin.

Alternatively, the location that inspired the novel could be the Black Hill grid reference SO330790 between Knighton and Clun and a few miles from Lurkenhope. Chatwin stayed nearby in Cwm Hall, Purslow with friends during the 1970s and was confidently cited as such in a BBC programme by his biographer.

Chatwin amalgamated reality with his research amongst the local indigenous populace in the time he researched the book, interweaving fact and fiction, gossip, locations, stories and social history.

Much of the book was written at Scethrog Tower, between Brecon and Crickhowell. The tower was home to George Melly whose wife, Diana, was a close friend of Chatwin's and was a dedicatee for the book.

== Prizes ==
The book was awarded the 1982 James Tait Black Memorial Prize and Whitbread First Novel of the Year Award (which raises a question over the status of the earlier book The Viceroy of Ouidah).

== Adaptation ==
On the Black Hill was adapted for the stage in 1986 and into a film in 1987.
