= Monnow Valley Walk =

40-mile footpath in Wales and England

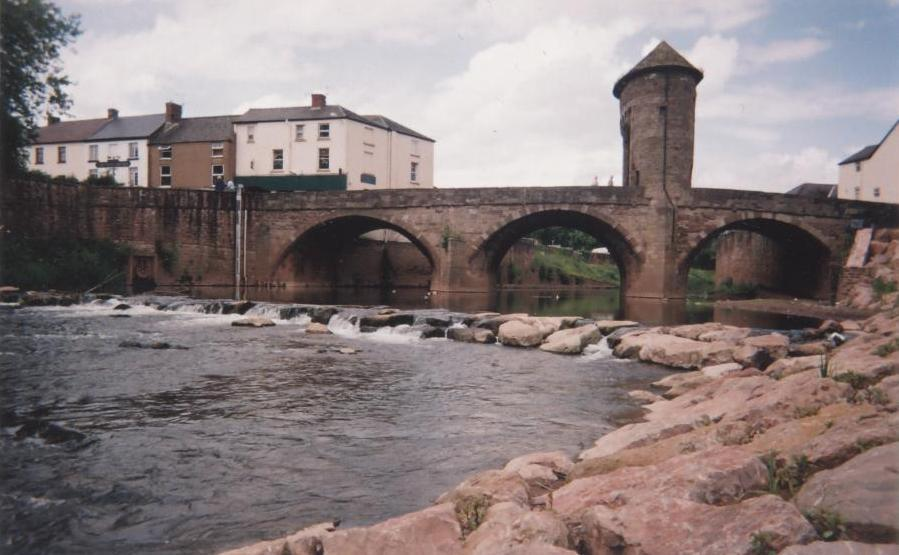
- The trail passes the River Monnow at Monmouth
- Length: 40 mi (64 km)
- Location: Wales, United Kingdom
- Trailheads: Monmouth; Hay-on-Wye (52.073°N 3.126°W)
- Use: Hiking
- Season: All year

Monnow Valley Walk is a 40 miles (64 km) long-distance footpath in north-east Monmouthshire, South Wales, with short sections in Herefordshire, England and Powys. It links Monmouth and Hay-on-Wye, following the River Monnow and the foot of the Black Mountains. The trail is linear running through the valley of the River Monnow, from Monmouth, near its confluence with the River Wye, to the headwaters below Hay Bluff. At this point, the walk links up with the Offa's Dyke Path National Trail, sharing the same route to the finishing points at Hay-on-Wye.

Notable settlements on route include Monmouth, Skenfrith, Grosmont, Clodock and Hay-on-Wye.
