= Hay Bluff =

Hill (677m) in Powys, Wales

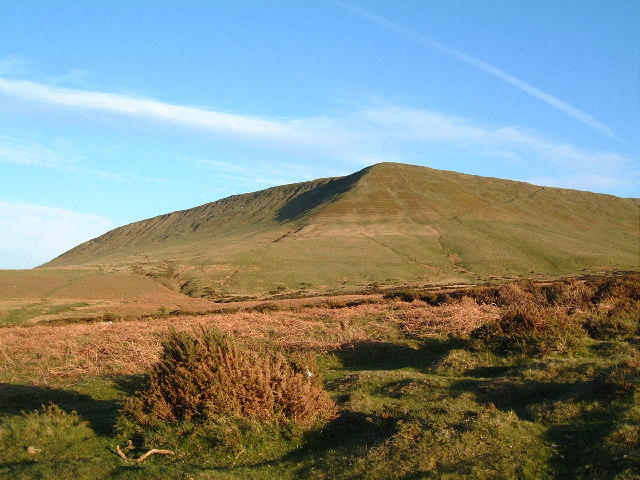
- Hay Bluff viewed from the north

Highest point
- Elevation: 677 m (2,221 ft)
- Prominence: 11 m (36 ft)
- Parent peak: Black Mountain
- Listing: Deleted Nuttall
- Coordinates: 52°01′22″N 3°06′10″W

Geography
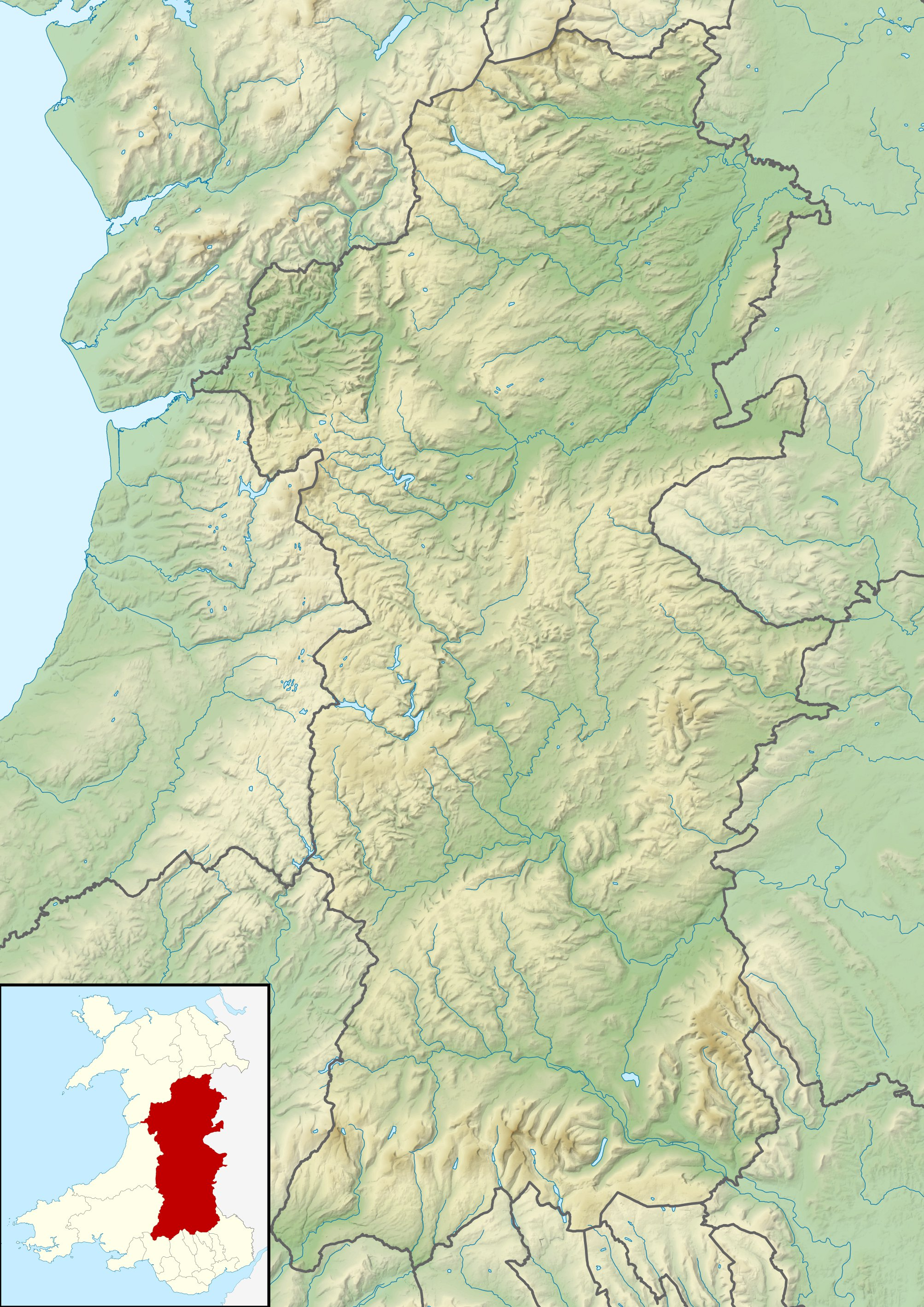
- Location within Powys
- Location: Powys, Wales
- Parent range: Black Mountains
- OS grid: SO24433662

Hay Bluff (Welsh: Penybegwn) is a prominent hill at the northern tip of the Black Mountains, an extensive upland massif which straddles the border between south-east Wales and England. The mountain sits at the point where the main northeast-facing escarpment of the Black Mountains meets the northwest facing escarpment, the next peak to the west being Twmpa. The flat summit of Hay Bluff which is marked by a triangulation pillar at a height of 677 metres (2,221 ft) overlooks the middle Wye Valley and the book town of Hay-on-Wye.

The hill is largely within the Welsh county of Powys though parts of its eastern flanks lie within the English county of Herefordshire. In 2024 a monolith similar to the one in Utah was found atop the hill. It is unknown who placed it there or for what purpose.

== Geology ==
The base and indeed greater part of the hill is formed from mudstones of the St Maughans Formation whilst the upper part is formed from the sandstones and mudstones of the Senni Formation (formerly known as the 'Senni Beds'), both of which are assigned to the Old Red Sandstone laid down during the Devonian period. A number of small quarries have been worked on its slopes in the past, not least for the Ffynnon Limestone, a calcrete which crops out along the northeastern and northwestern flanks of the hill at the base of the Senni Formation.

== Access ==
The Offa's Dyke national trail makes a steep ascent of the hill's northern slopes and then heads south eastwards along the broad ridge of the Black Mountain and the Hatterrall Ridge. A more gentle path to the summit follows the crest of the northwest-facing scarp, known as Ffynnon y Parc, from the road summit about 1 mile / 1.7 km to the southwest at Gospel Pass. There is also a clear, but unpaved path which passes along the edge of the escarpment to the east with good views over the countryside towards Hay-on-Wye. It leads to the trig point at the Black Hill (Herefordshire), and continues on to the south-east dropping down the stony knife-edge ridge towards Longtown. There is a small car park where the ridge drops into the Olchon valley, about 2 miles north of Longtown itself. The entire hill is designated as open country thus providing walkers with the freedom to roam at will.
