= Cwmyoy =

Rural parish in Monmouthshire, Wales

Coordinates: 51.90291°N 3.02030°W

Cwmyoy: Welsh: Cwm-iou
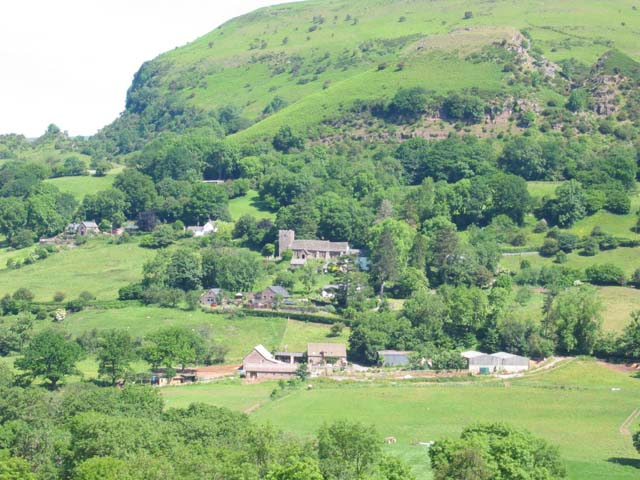
- Cwmyoy, on the slope of Hatterrall Hill

- Location within Monmouthshire
- OS grid reference: SO299232
- Principal area: Monmouthshire
- Preserved county: Gwent
- Country: Wales
- Sovereign state: United Kingdom
- Post town: ABERGAVENNY
- Postcode district: NP7
- Dialling code: 01600
- Police: Gwent
- Fire: South Wales
- Ambulance: Welsh
- UK Parliament: Monmouth
- Senedd Cymru – Welsh Parliament: Monmouth

Cwmyoy is an extensive rural parish in Monmouthshire, Wales (Welsh: Cwm Iou, for the valley and parish; Welsh: Cwm-iou, for the village). The standard Welsh name is Cwm Iau or Cwm-iau. In the Gwentian dialect of Welsh that was spoken here until the late 1800s, the name was pronounced as Cwm Iou ('ou', also spelt informally 'oi', for standard 'au' is a common feature of south Wales Welsh). The 'English' name is in fact this local dialect form in a more English spelling. The name of the valley probably originates from the Welsh word iau meaning yoke, in reference to the shape of the hill surrounding it.

The village of Cwmyoy is 7 miles (11 km) north of Abergavenny and 4 miles (6.4 km) south of Llanthony in the Vale of Ewyas in the Black Mountains. It is within the Brecon Beacons National Park, in an upland location just below the broad ridge of Hatterrall Hill, which carries the Wales–England border and Offa's Dyke Path.

== The parish ==
The parish is nearly 8 miles (13 km) long and 1 mile (1.6 km) broad, and includes Llanthony as well as Cwmyoy itself. In 1893, an area in the neighbouring valley of the Grwyne Fawr, known in Welsh as Ffwddog and in English as the Fothock, which had been an exclave of Herefordshire, was transferred into the parish.

== Local amenities ==
The Cwmyoy area is popular for hillwalking and pony trekking. Llanthony Priory, Capel-y-ffin and Gospel Pass are all accessed by passing below Cwmyoy village.

Cwmyoy also has a small village hall which is run as a registered charity.

== St Martin's Church ==
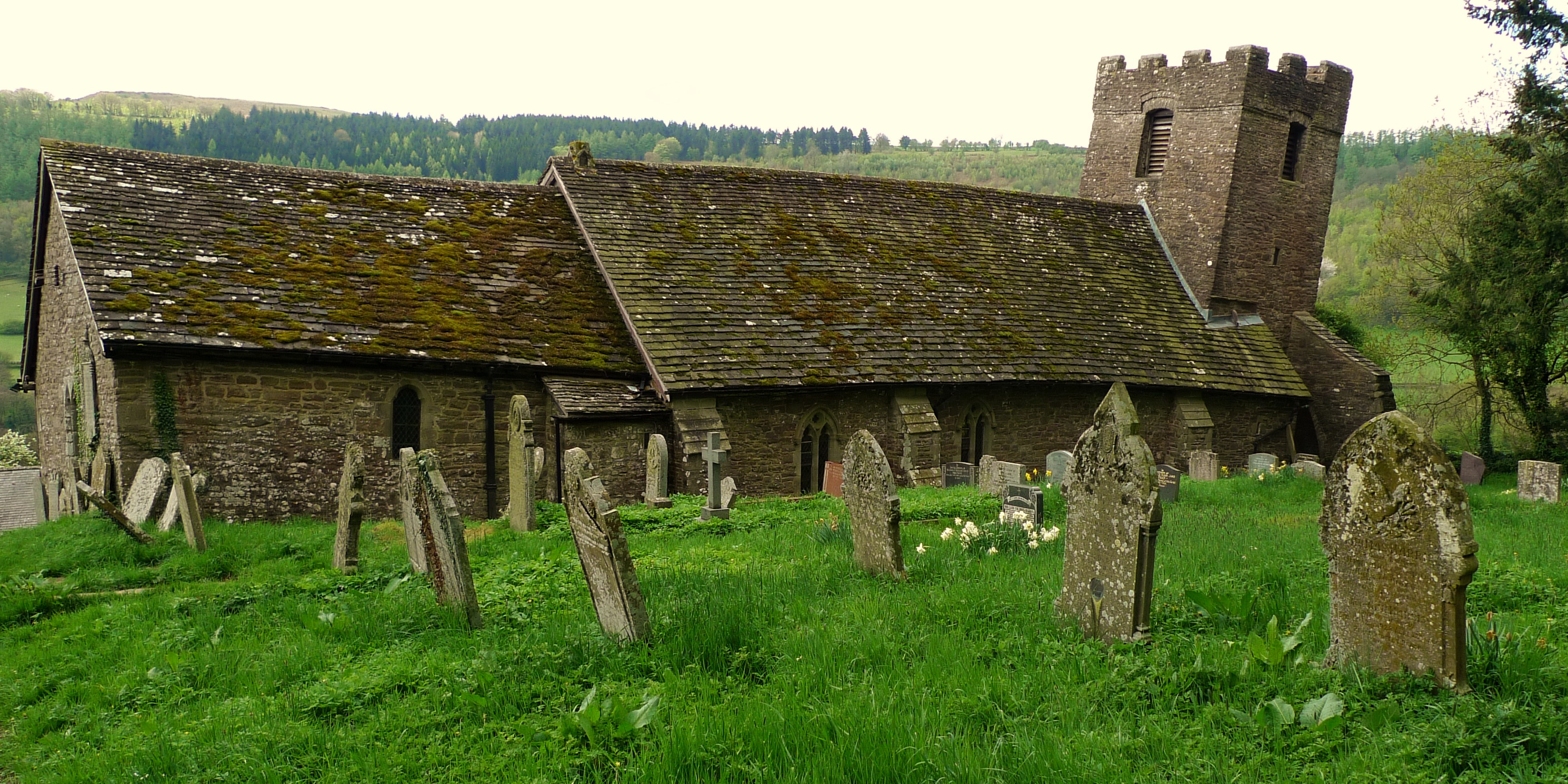
St Martin's Church

Cwmyoy is best known for St Martin's Church, a stone parish church standing on a steep hillside on the east side of the valley and which has been subject to slippage. It has been called the "most crooked church in Great Britain." Local historian Fred Hando (1958) calls it "the Church below the Landslide" and describes the chancel as "a remarkable example of a weeping chancel... the nave represents our Lord's body, and the deflected chancel His head fallen sideways in death." He notes that the whole chancel, not just its axis, is out of line, suggesting it was intentionally built this way and is not the result of the slippage.
