= Capel-y-ffin =

Hamlet in Powys, Wales

Coordinates: 51.977°N 3.086°W

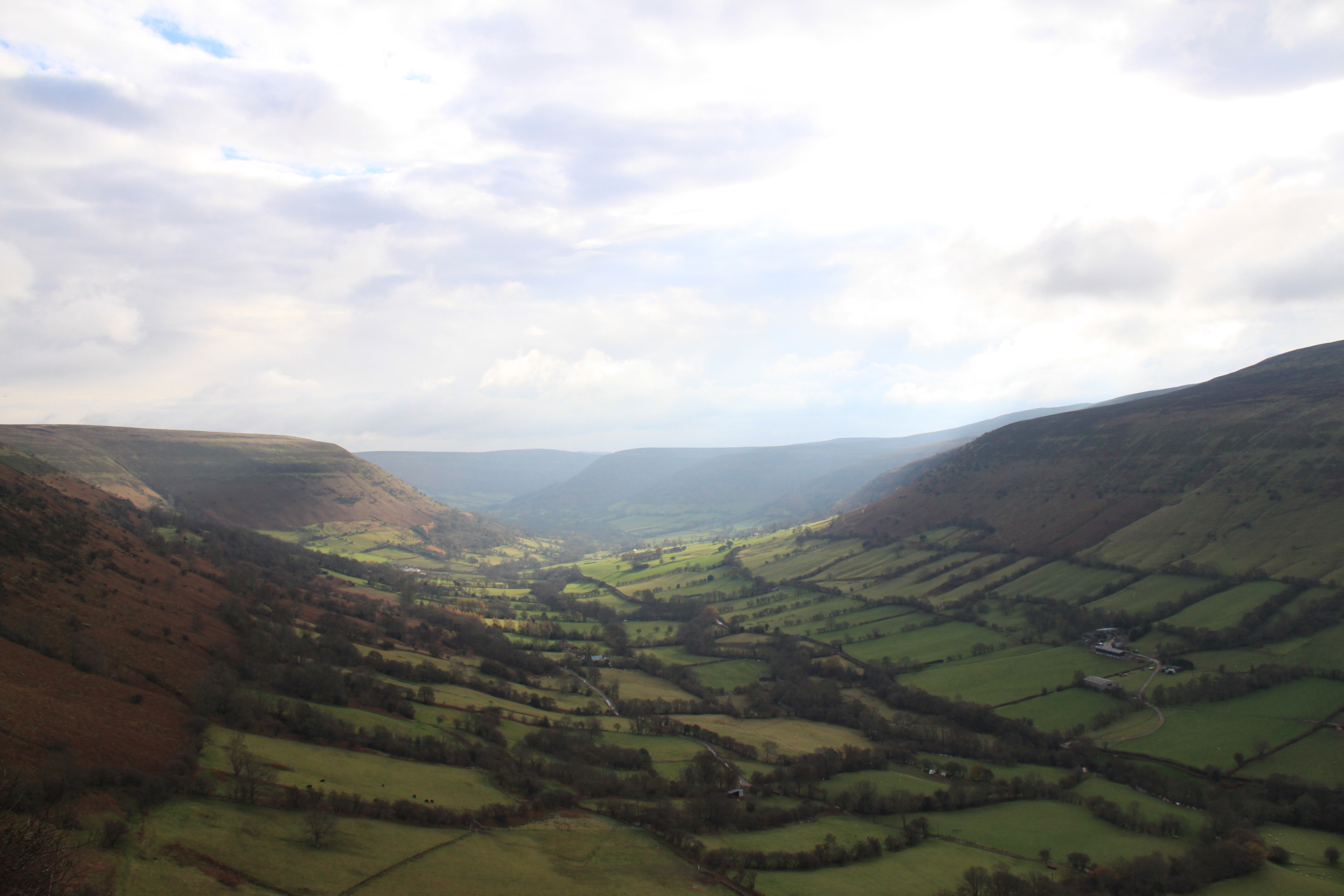

- Location within Powys
- Population: 50 (estimated)
- OS grid reference: SO255315
- Principal area: Powys
- Preserved county: Powys
- Country: Wales
- Sovereign state: United Kingdom
- Post town: ABERGAVENNY
- Postcode district: NP7
- Dialling code: 01873
- Police: Dyfed-Powys
- Fire: Mid and West Wales
- Ambulance: Welsh
- UK Parliament: Brecon, Radnor and Cwm Tawe
- Senedd Cymru – Welsh Parliament: Brycheiniog Tawe Nedd

Capel-y-ffin (Welsh for 'chapel of the boundary') is a hamlet near the English-Welsh border, a couple of miles north of Llanthony in Powys, Wales. It lies within the Black Mountains and within the Brecon Beacons National Park. The nearest town is Hay-on-Wye, some 8 miles (13 km) to the northwest.

== History ==
=== St Mary's Chapel ===
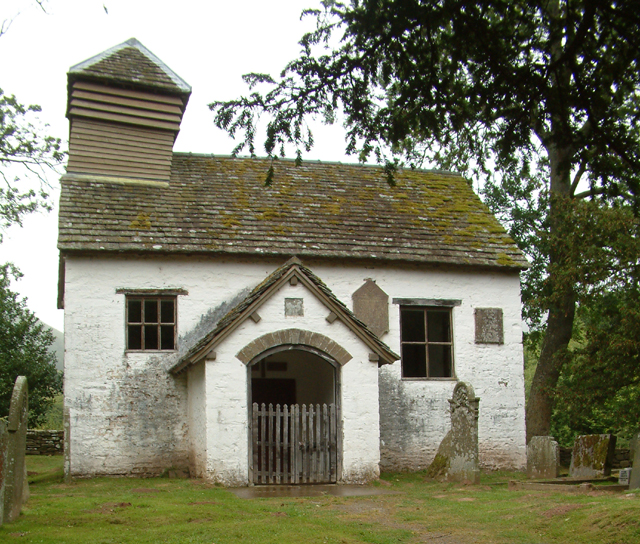
The owlish St Mary's Chapel

The name Capel-y-ffin is Welsh, and means "chapel of the boundary" since it lies in the valley of the River Honddu close to the boundary of the historical dioceses of St David's and Llandaf, now Swansea and Brecon and Monmouth. The chapel itself is dedicated to St Mary and was built in 1762, replacing an earlier 15th-century structure. It originally served as a chapel of ease for the parish church at Llanigon, but is now within its own ecclesiastical parish. With an interior of just 26 by 13 feet (8 by 4 metres), the chapel is one of the smallest in Wales and reminded diarist Francis Kilvert of an owl. The official CADW Grade II listing mentions the medieval font, presumably from the earlier church, and a churchyard cross that might date from that era.

On the other side of the River Honddu is a small, whitewashed Baptist chapel built by the two brothers, William and David Prosser. A wall plaque commemorates their work in bringing The Ministry of the Gospel to their house in the year 1737. And Secured this Place for That Sacred Use for the Time Being. Both died near the End of the Year 1780.

The hamlet was the last Welsh-speaking community in this part of Wales.

=== The Monastery ===
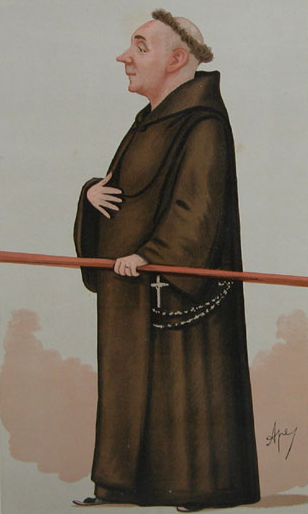
Father Ignatius, by Carlo Pellegrini, 1887

In 1869, Joseph Leycester Lyne, self-styled "Father Ignatius", purchased 32 acres (130,000 m^{2}) of land at Capel-y-ffin in order to build an Anglican monastery near the ruins of Llanthony Priory. With the help of fellow monks and local masons, he succeeded in building 'Llanthony Tertia', where an eccentric version of monastic life – witnessed by Francis Kilvert – continued till his death in 1908. Lyne is buried in the monastery church which, being poorly built and subsequently neglected, is now partly ruined. A memorial trust exists to restore the church and an annual pilgrimage is held between Llanthony Priory and Capel-y-ffin.

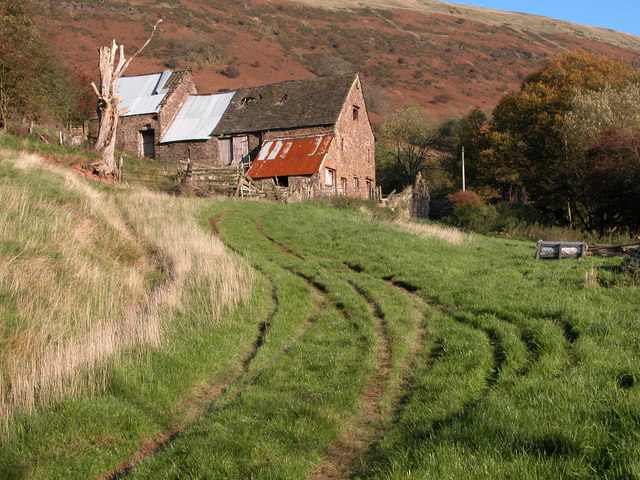
The Vision Farm

In 1880, Lyne's religious convictions were confirmed by visions of the Virgin Mary seen in the monastery and nearby fields by monks and local farm boys. The Vision Farm, to the south-east of the hamlet, was so renamed as a result of these apparitions. The farm (at least in name) features in the novel On the Black Hill by Bruce Chatwin, though the author changed its location.

From August 1924 to October 1928, the artist Eric Gill and his family lived in the former monastery at Capel-y-ffin. It was here that he designed the typefaces Perpetua and Gill Sans. With him was the poet and artist David Jones, who painted the local scenery. Jones features as a character in the novel Resistance by Owen Sheers, set close by in the Olchon Valley.

=== 1990 aeroplane crash ===
On 7 February 1990 at 9am, a United States Air Force Fairchild Republic A-10 Thunderbolt II crashed into Tarren Yr Escob, a hill one kilometre west of the village, killing the pilot. The aircraft was from the 509th Tactical Fighter Squadron.
