= Clydog =

6th-century Welsh king

Clydog (also known as Clydawg, Clodock, Clitaucus, Cleodicus, Cladocus) was a sixth-century Welsh king of Ergyng who became a saint. His feast day is traditionally held on 3 November but is also celebrated on 19 August.

In imagery, Clydog is represented as a king holding a sword and a lily.

== Life ==
Clydog was a member of the clan of the legendary king Brychan, whose children and grandchildren became the famed saints of Cornwall and Wales. His father was Clydwyn, himself a saint and the son of Brychan. Although some sources say he conquered the whole of South Wales, which is unlikely, but it is possible that he was at one time also king of Ceredigion and Dyfed along with his brother Dedyw. His other brothers included St Cynon and St Cynlefr the Martyr and St Berwen.

As king of Ergyng he ruled over parts of Monmouthshire and Herefordshire, known for its time of peace and justice. With his brother Dedyw he trained as a priest under Saint Cadoc at Llancarfan.

Following his return to Ergyng, a woman fell in love with him and refused to marry anyone else. A local Saxon noble had also fallen for the same woman. Shortly after while Clydog was hunting a deer, the Saxon shot Clydog with an arrow, killing him. His body was placed on a cart and taken to the ford of the river below the present church in Clodock, at which point the cart broke and the oxen could go no further. He was thus buried there at Caer Gledog, near Longtown, Herefordshire.

Some sources label Clydog a martyr, being a Christian killed by an outsider, but this is probably a mistranslation of the word merthyr (shrine). A chapel was built above his burial which became a site of pilgrimage. His fame spread and even several centuries later people were still being named after him, including a 12th-century Bishop of Llandaff.

St Clydawg's church now covers the parish of Clodock, which was transferred from Wales to England in 1535.

He was married three times in total; his wives were successively Prawst, Ribrawst and Roistri.
