= Clodock =

Village in Herefordshire, England

Coordinates: 51°56′31″N 2°58′56″W

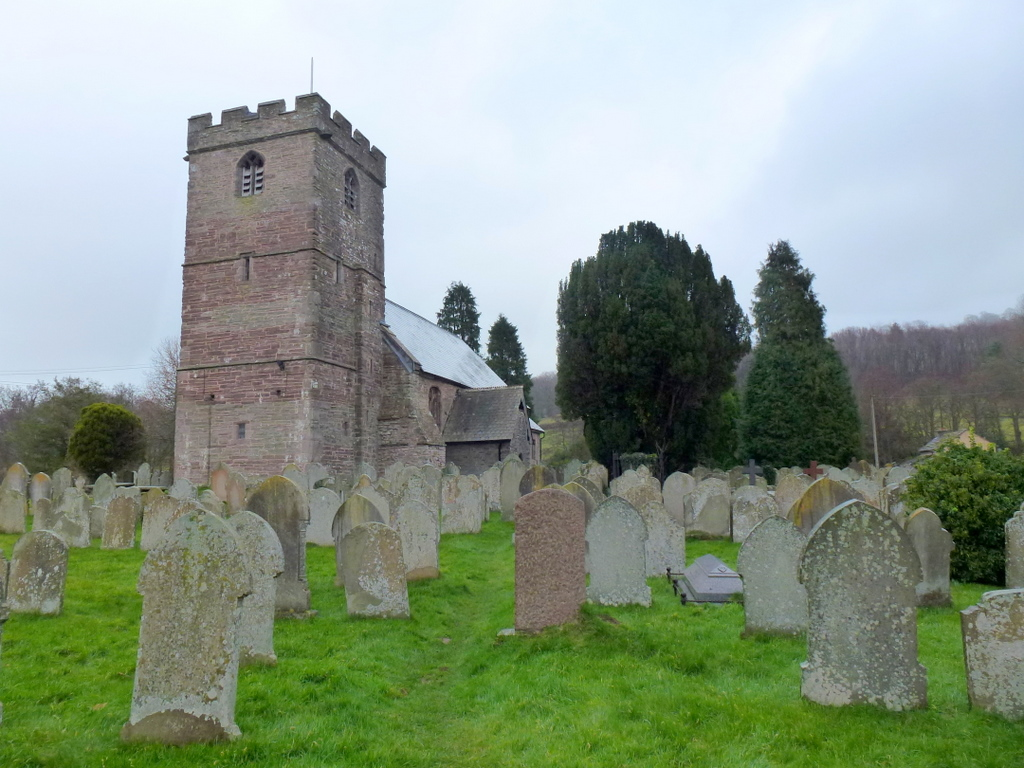
St. Clydawg's church

Clodock is a village in the west of Herefordshire, England. It lies on the River Monnow in the foothills of the Black Mountains, close to the border with Wales. The village is in the civil parish of Longtown.

Before 1536 Clodock was in the marcher lordship of Ewyas Lacy. Until 1866 it was a large parish (until 1852 in the Diocese of St Davids), which included the chapelries of Craswall, Llanveynoe, Longtown and Newton. In 1866 each chapelry became a separate civil parish, and the village of Clodock became part of the civil parish of Longtown.

The parish church is dedicated to St Clydog, King of the Welsh Kingdom's of Ewyas and Ergyng, who was killed during the 6th century. The present church dates from the 12th century, and is a Grade I listed building. It is completely un-Victorianised, with west gallery, box-pews, three-decker pulpit and 17th-century sanctuary furniture.

The village pub, the Cornewall Arms, is a Grade II listed building and its traditional interior has been graded two stars ("very special historic interest") on the Campaign for Real Ale's inventory of historic pub interiors.
