= Myarth =

Hill (292m) in Powys, Wales

Coordinates: 51.880°N 3.206°W

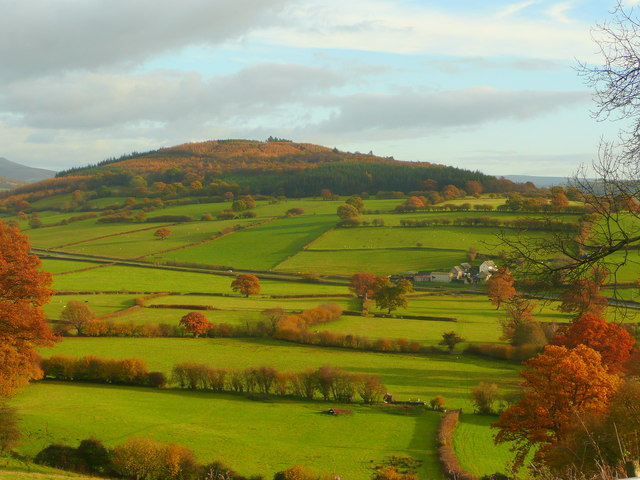
- Myarth viewed from the west

Highest point
- Elevation: 292 m (958 ft)
- Prominence: 164 m (538 ft)
- Parent peak: Allt yr Esgair
- Listing: Marilyn in Wales

Naming
- Language of name: Welsh

Geography
- Location: Powys, Wales
- OS grid: SO170208

Myarth is a hill in the Usk Valley in the county of Powys in South Wales, about 2 miles west of Crickhowell. Its summit at 292 metres (958 ft) is covered by trees, whilst the larger part of its slopes are also wooded. It is listed as a Marilyn. Myarth has an elongate form commonly ascribed to erosion by the west-to-east movement of the Usk Valley glacier during successive ice ages. The River Usk runs along the foot of the hill on its southern side. Myarth forms a prominent feature in many views over the Usk Valley and often features in commercial photography of the area.

Though it is ringed by public roads—the A40 to the north and a minor road to the south—there is no public access to the hill itself, which is in private ownership.

In 2016, the hill was used as the location for a segment of an episode of the motoring series The Grand Tour.

The summit of the hill once contained a prehistoric hill fort, known as Myarth Camp, now largely obliterated by trees. It is thought to date from the Iron Age (c. 800 BC – AD 74). It had a double vallum, or rampart, and measured around 350m WNW/ESE by 210m, with an entrance at the east end.

In the valley directly below the hill fort, half a mile to the north, a Roman fort was established in the mid-70s AD, when the Romans subdued the local tribe, the Silures. The fort, known today as Pen-y-Gaer, remained in use until the mid-2nd century AD. Near the Roman fort, on its south side, a civilian settlement or vicus grew up, the traces of which are mostly buried below ground today; it was occupied between the 1st and 3rd centuries AD.

On the south side of Myarth Hill a ford, now no longer used, once crossed the River Usk to Cyffredin, a hamlet near Llangynidr, from where a road passes over Llangynidr Mountain to Ebbw Vale.
