= Gospel Pass =

Pass in Powys, Wales

Coordinates: 52.0104°N 3.1158°W

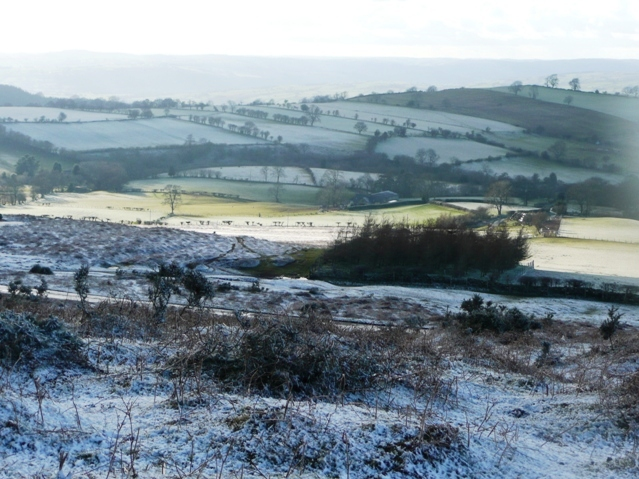
West from the Gospel Pass road on a day of strong winds, bright sunshine, snow showers and wonderful clear views

The Gospel Pass (Welsh: Bwlch yr Efengyl) is the highest road pass in Wales. It is at the head of the Vale of Ewyas in the Black Mountains of southeast Wales. Starting from Hay-on-Wye the narrow mountain road climbs steeply to a height of 549 metres (1,801 ft) above sea level, squeezing between the mountains of Twmpa to the west and Hay Bluff to the east, before dropping down into the valley to the south on its way to Llanthony Priory, Llanfihangel Crucorney and Abergavenny. At one time a small lead-mining operation was established at the pass. The Gospel Pass is one of the most celebrated locations within the Brecon Beacons National Park, being a popular destination for sightseers and is popular too with walkers and cyclists. Indeed, the Gospel Pass road forms a part of route 42 of the National Cycle Network. It also featured in the opening scenes of the film An American Werewolf In London.

It is a single track road over most of its length, but there are numerous passing places. Owing to its height and exposure, it is occasionally blocked by snow during the winter. It is well used by walkers since it gives access to the major peaks of the Black Mountains, especially at the northern end of the road, where there are several car parks.

== Origin of name ==
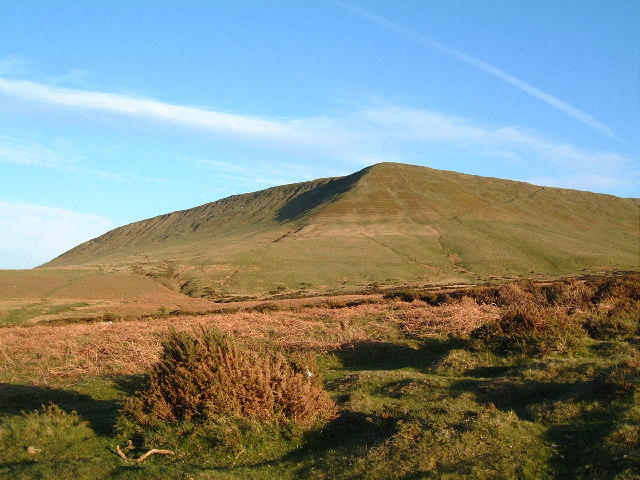
View of Hay Bluff from the north and near the Gospel Pass

The name is believed locally to derive from St Paul, brought to Wales through the pass by the daughter of Caradog (or Caractacus), first preaching the gospel to her people here. According to the Community Council website he paid a visit on that occasion to Caradog, who then lived at the Celyn, and whom he had formerly met in Rome. It is alternatively supposed to derive from the passage through here in the 12th century of Crusaders preaching and fundraising.

== Walking ==
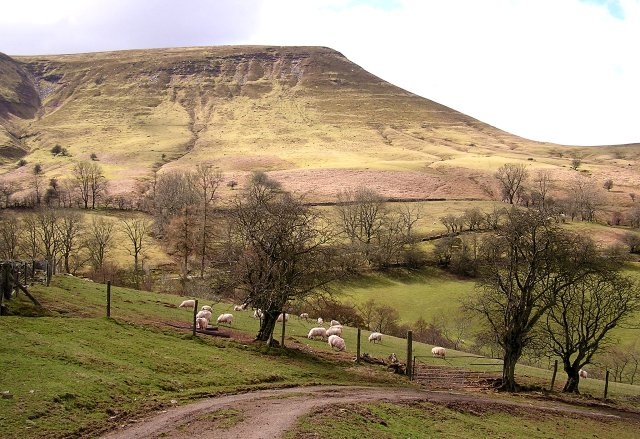
View of Twmpa from the Gospel Pass

There is a car park near the top of the pass coming from the south and another informal one under Hay Bluff. They provide convenient starting points for exploring Hay Bluff and Twmpa. The Offa's Dyke Path crosses the road near the more northerly car park, and leads to Hay Bluff before leading on to Hatterall Ridge and the Black Mountain. Although substantial efforts have been made to provide a dry stone pavement on the footpaths, especially the official Offa's Dyke Path, other routes are not so well protected. Peat bogs are frequent, and the ground may be very wet underfoot on the high ground.

Welsh mountain ponies are frequently seen near the car park, together with sheep.
