= England–Wales border =

National boundary

England–Wales border Ffin Cymru a Lloegr
- Map showing the England–Wales border, and local authorities on either side

Characteristics
- Entities: England Wales
- Length: 160 miles (260 km)

History
- Established: 4th or 5th century AD; Anglo-Saxon settlement of Britain
- Current shape: 1972; Local Government Act 1972
- Treaties: Laws in Wales Acts 1535 and 1542

The England–Wales border, also known as the Wales–England border or the Anglo-Welsh border, runs for 160 miles (260 km) from the Dee estuary, in the north, to the Severn estuary in the south, separating England and Wales, forming a internal boundary of the United Kingdom.

It has followed broadly the same line since the 8th century, and in part that of Offa's Dyke; the modern boundary was fixed in 1536, when the former marcher lordships which occupied the border area were abolished and new county boundaries were created. The administrative boundary of Wales was confirmed in the Local Government Act 1972. Whether Monmouthshire was part of Wales, or an English county treated for most purposes as though it were Welsh, was also settled by the 1972 Act, which included it in Wales.

== Geography ==
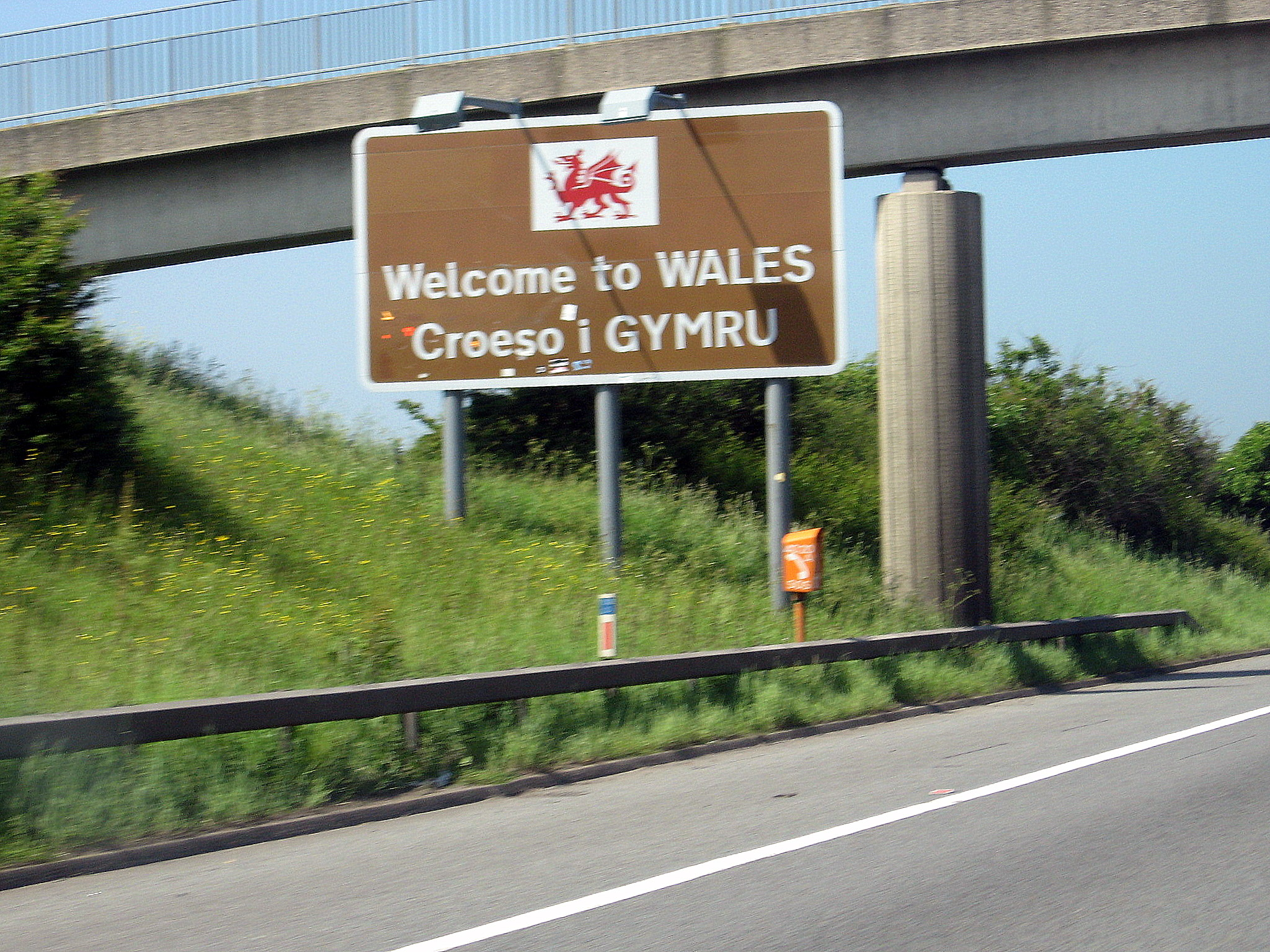
Bilingual "Welcome to Wales" sign

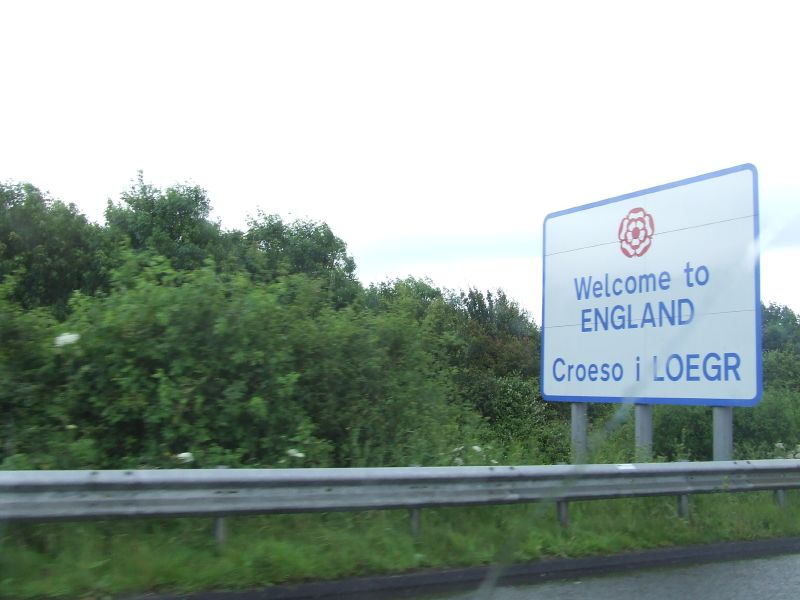
Bilingual "Welcome to England" sign

The modern boundary between Wales and England runs from the salt marshes of the Dee estuary adjoining the Wirral Peninsula, across reclaimed land to the River Dee at Saltney just west of Chester. It then loops south to include within England an area southwest of Chester, before rejoining the Dee, and then loops east of the river to include within Wales a large area known as Maelor Saesneg ('English Maelor'), formerly an exclave of Flintshire, between Bangor-on-Dee (in Wales) and Whitchurch, Shropshire (in England). Returning to the River Dee as far as Chirk, the boundary then loops to the west, following Offa's Dyke itself for about 2 miles (3 km), and including within England the town of Oswestry, before reaching the River Vyrnwy at Llanymynech. It follows the Vyrnwy to its confluence with the River Severn, and then continues southwards, rising over Long Mountain east of Welshpool. East of Montgomery, the boundary again follows the line of Offa's Dyke for about 2 miles (3 km), before looping eastwards to include within Wales a large area near Churchstoke including Corndon Hill. It then runs westwards to the River Teme, and follows the river southeastwards through Knighton before turning south towards the River Lugg at Presteigne, which is within Wales.

The boundary continues southwards across hills to the River Wye, and follows the river upstream for a short distance to Hay-on-Wye, on the Welsh side of the border. It continues southwards and rises through and across the Black Mountains, following the Hatterall Ridge past Llanthony on the Welsh side and Longtown, Herefordshire on the English side, to reach the River Monnow near Pandy. It then generally follows the river, past Pontrilas (in England) and Skenfrith (in Wales), towards Monmouth, looping eastwards to include the town itself and a surrounding area within Wales. At Redbrook, the boundary again reaches the Wye, and follows the river southwards, past Tintern and Chepstow on the Welsh side, to its confluence with the Severn at the Severn Bridge. The boundary then continues down the Severn estuary towards the Bristol Channel, with the small island of Flat Holm being administered as part of Wales and the neighbouring island of Steep Holm as part of England.

=== Administrative boundary ===
The boundary passes between Flintshire, Wrexham County Borough, Powys and Monmouthshire in Wales, and Cheshire, Shropshire, Herefordshire and Gloucestershire in England.

== History ==
=== Ancient Britain ===
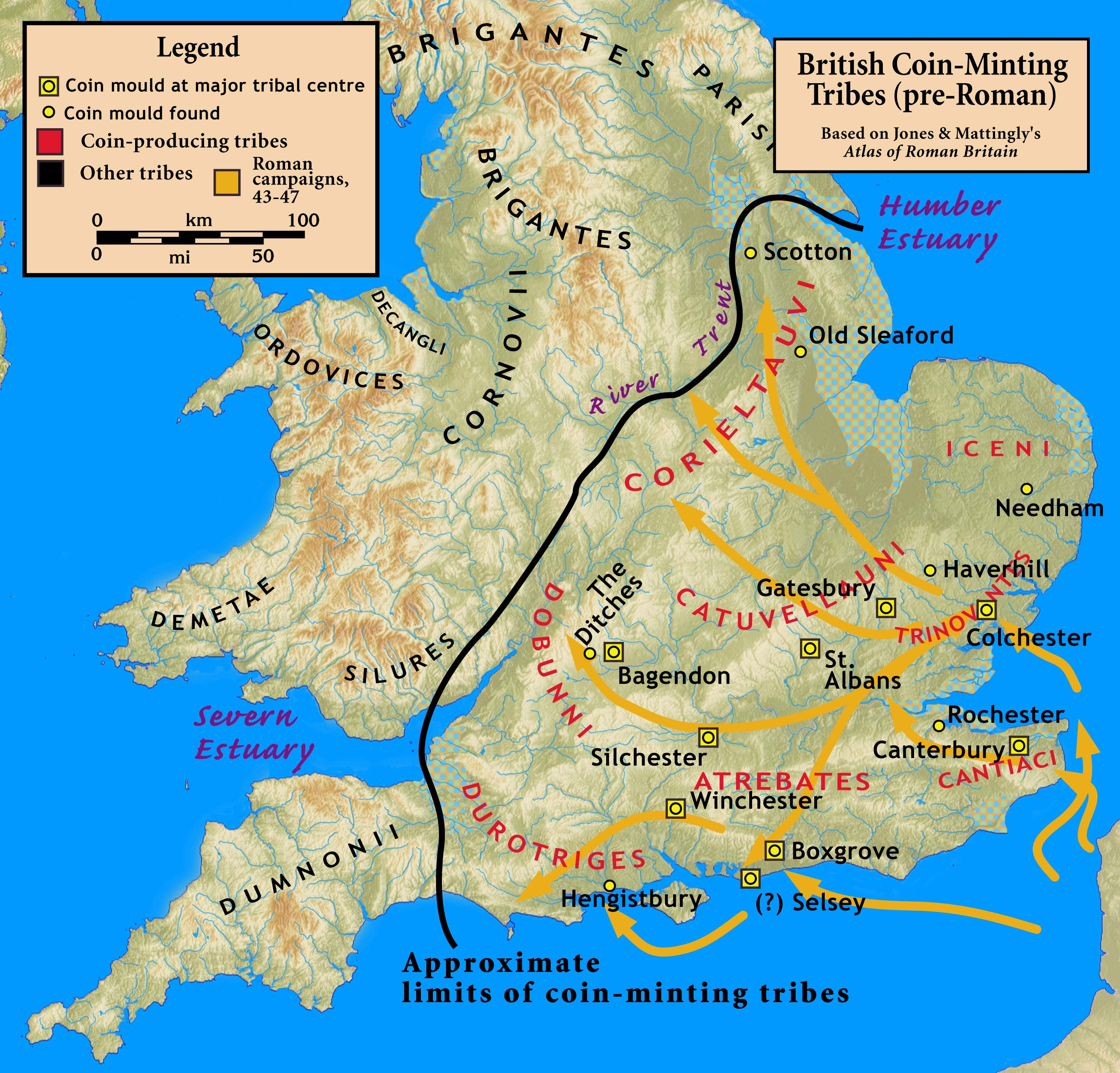
The approximate limit of coin-minting tribes in south Britain, and the limits of the campaigns of Claudius and Aulus Plautius.

Before and during the Roman occupation of Britain, all the native inhabitants of the island (other than the Pictish/Caledonian tribes of what is now northern Scotland—and also excepting the Lloegyr of greater south-east Britain) spoke Brythonic languages, a sub-family of the Insular Celtic languages, and were regarded as Britons. The topographical contrast between the mountainous western areas and the generally lower-lying areas to the east is reflected in the nature of ancient settlements, with the majority of hillforts in Britain found in this western area.

=== Roman era ===
During the Roman occupation, the tribes of Wales (Ordovices, Deceangli, Demetae, and especially the Silures) were noted by Roman authors as fiercely resisting any occupation. As such the border area became a centre of military activity, with legions based at Deva (Chester), Viroconium (Wroxeter), and Isca Augusta (Caerleon). In most of Wales, the militaristic nature of the occupation was in stark contrast to that of southeast Britain. As such, by the end of Roman rule, there would have been a cultural border, between the highly Romanised Romano-British in the east, and the more independent and tribal kingdoms to the west. This western area was, however, largely Christian, and a number of successor states attempted to continue Roman practices. The most successful of these were the Kingdom of Gwynedd in the northwest, the Kingdom of Gwent and Glywysing in the southeast, the Kingdom of Dyfed in the southwest and the Kingdom of Powys in the east. Powys roughly coincided with the territory of the Celtic Cornovii tribe whose civitas or administrative centre during the Roman period was at Viroconium. Gwynedd, at the height of its power, extended as far east as the Dee estuary. Gradually, from the 5th century onwards, pagan tribes from the east, including the Angles and Saxons, conquered eastern and southern Britain, which later became England.

In the south, the Welsh kingdom of Gwent broadly covered the same area as the pre-Roman Silures, traditionally the area between the rivers Usk, Wye and the Severn estuary. It was centred at different times on Venta (Caerwent), from which it derived its name, and Isca Augusta (Caerleon). Gwent generally allied with, and at various times was joined with, the smaller Welsh kingdom of Ergyng, centred in present-day southern Herefordshire west of the Wye (and deriving its name from the Roman town of Ariconium); and the larger kingdom of Glywysing in modern Glamorgan. The name Glywysing may indicate that it was founded by a British native of Glevum (Gloucester).

=== Medieval era ===
Peoples of southern Britain, c. 600 AD

The Battle of Mons Badonicus, c. 500, could have been fought near Bath between the British, the victors, and Anglo-Saxons attempting to reach the Severn estuary, but its date and location are very uncertain and it may equally well have taken place in Somerset or Dorset. However, it is more certain that the Anglo-Saxon kingdom of Wessex emerged in the 6th and 7th centuries in the upper Thames valley, Cotswolds and Hampshire areas. In 577, the Battle of Deorham in the southern Cotswolds was won by the Anglo-Saxons, and led to Wessex extending its control to the Severn estuary and the cities of Gloucester, Cirencester, and Bath. This severed the land link between the Britons of Wales and those of the south west peninsula. By about 600, however, the area of modern Gloucestershire east of the Severn, as well as most of Worcestershire, was controlled by another group, the Hwicce, who may have arisen from intermarriage between Anglo-Saxon and British leading families, possibly the successors to the pre-Roman Dobunni. The Hwicce came increasingly under Mercian hegemony.

At the Battle of Chester in 616, the forces of Powys and other allied Brythonic kingdoms were defeated by the Northumbrians under Æthelfrith. This divided the Britons of Wales from those in Northern England, including Lancashire, Cumbria, and south west Scotland, an area which became known as "Yr Hen Ogledd" or "the Old North". Within a few decades, the Welsh became engaged in further defensive warfare against the increasingly powerful kingdom of Mercia, based at Tamworth in what became the West Midlands of England. Shrewsbury, was conquered by Oswiu of Northumbria in 656 when he had become overlord of the Mercians. Powys then withdrew from the lowland areas now in southern Cheshire, Shropshire and Herefordshire, which became known to Welsh poets as "The Paradise of Powys". The areas were occupied by Anglo-Saxon groups who became sub-kingdoms of Mercia, the Wreocensǣte or Wrekinset in the northern part of what became Shropshire, and the Magonsæte in the southern part. Further south, the area north west of the Severn later known as the Forest of Dean seems to have remained in British (that is, Welsh) hands until about 760.

==== Offa's Dyke ====
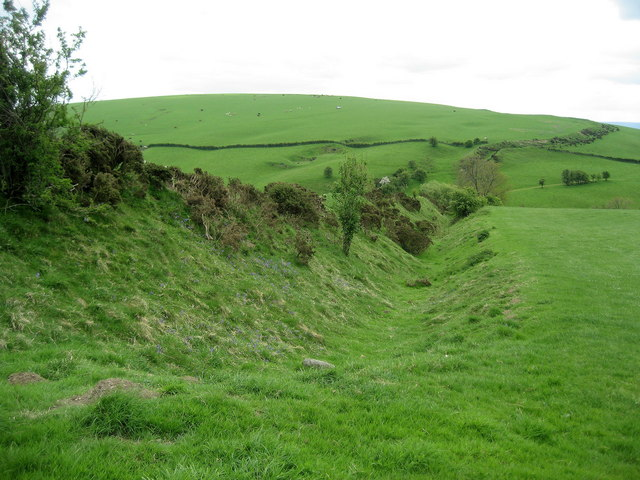
Offa's Dyke near Clun in Shropshire

After Ine of Wessex abdicated in 726, Æthelbald of Mercia established Mercia's hegemony over the Anglo-Saxons south of the Humber. However, campaigns by Powys against Mercia led to the building of Wat's Dyke, an earthwork boundary extending from the Severn valley near Oswestry to the Dee at Basingwerk in what became Flintshire, perhaps to protect recently acquired lands. After Æthelbald was killed in 757, a brief civil war in Mercia then ended in victory for his distant cousin, Offa. As king, he rebuilt Mercia's hegemony over the southern English through military campaigns, and also caused the construction of Offa's Dyke, around the years 770 and 780. Offa's Dyke is a massive linear earthwork, up to 65 feet (20 m) wide (including its surrounding ditch) and 8 feet (2.4 m) high. It is much larger and longer than Wat's Dyke, and runs roughly parallel to it. The earthwork was generally dug with the displaced soil piled into a bank on the Mercian (eastern) side, providing an open view into Wales and suggesting that it was built by Mercia to guard against attacks or raids from Powys. The late 9th-century writer Asser wrote that Offa "terrified all the neighbouring kings and provinces around him, and ... had a great dyke built between Wales and Mercia from sea to sea". In the mid-20th century, Sir Cyril Fox completed a major survey of the Dyke and stated that it ran from the Dee to the Severn, as Asser suggested, but with gaps, especially in the Herefordshire area, where natural barriers of strong rivers or dense forests provided sufficient defence. More recent research by David Hill and Margaret Worthington concluded that there is little evidence for the Dyke stretching "from sea to sea", but that the earthwork built by Offa stretched some 64 miles (103 km) between Rushock Hill near Kington in Herefordshire, and Treuddyn in Flintshire. Earthworks in the far north and south, including sections overlooking the Wye valley and east of the Wye at Beachley, may in their view have been built for different purposes at different times, although their conclusions are themselves disputed.

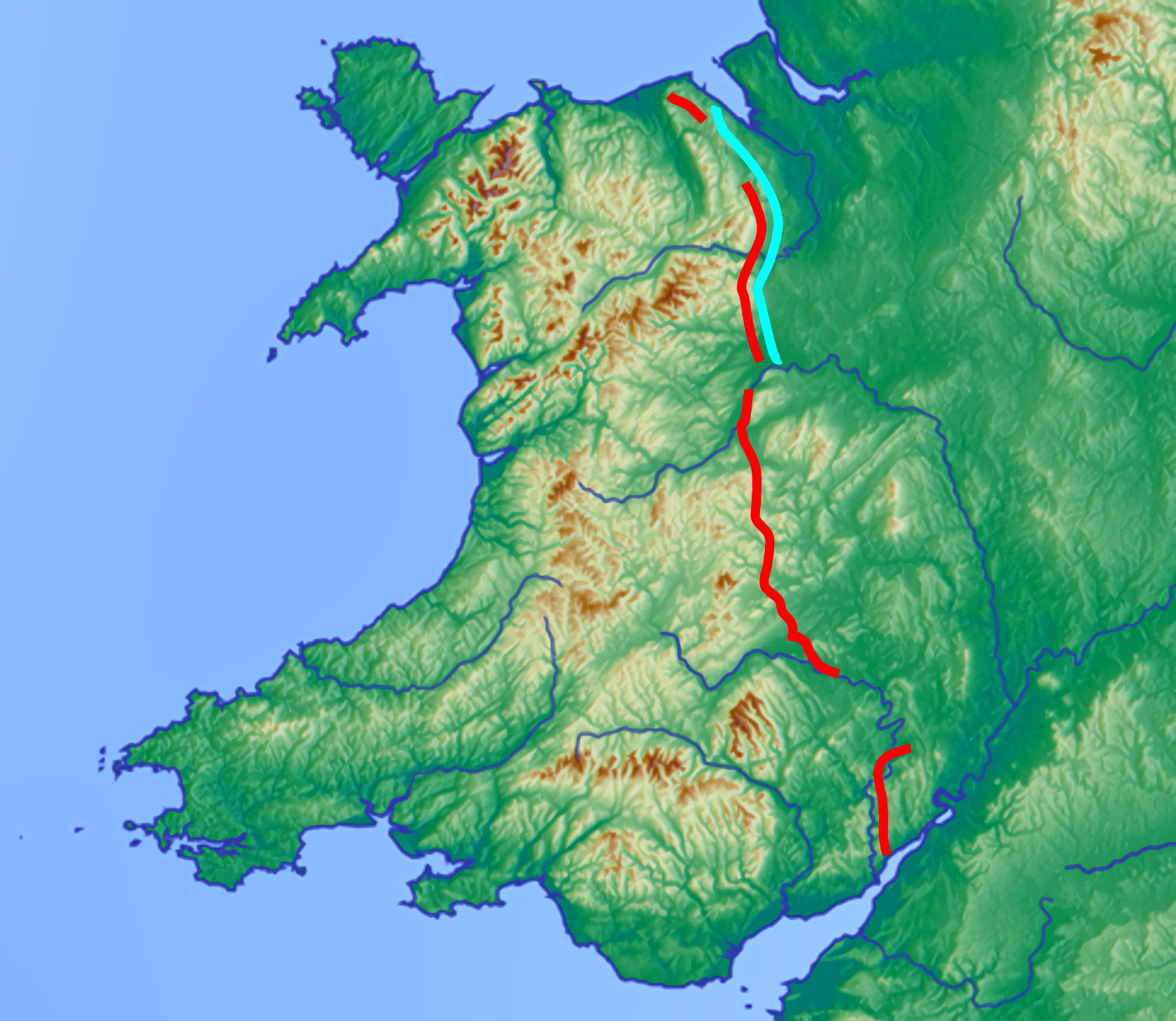
Map of Offa's Dyke Offa's Dyke Wat's Dyke

Offa's Dyke largely remained the frontier between the Welsh and English in later centuries. By the 9th century, the expanding power of Mercia led to it gaining control over Ergyng and nearby Hereford. The system of shires which was later to form the basis of local administration throughout England and eventually Wales originated in Wessex, where it became established during the 8th century. Wessex and Mercia gradually established an occasionally unstable alliance, with Wessex gaining the upper hand. According to Asser, the southern Welsh kings, including Hywel ap Rhys of Glywysing, commended themselves to Alfred the Great of Wessex in about 885. Alfred's son Edward the Elder also secured homage from the Welsh, although sporadic border unrest continued. In the early 10th century, a document known as The Ordinance Concerning the Dunsaete records procedures for dealing with disputes between the English and the Welsh, and implies that areas west of the Wye in Archenfield were still culturally Welsh. It stated that the English should only cross into the Welsh side, and vice versa, in the presence of an appointed man who had the responsibility of making sure that the foreigner was safely escorted back to the crossing point. In 926, Edward's successor Athelstan, "King of the English", summoned the Welsh kings including Hywel Dda of Deheubarth to a meeting at Hereford, and according to William of Malmesbury laid down the boundary between England and Wales, particularly the disputed southern stretch where he specified that the eastern bank of the Wye should form the boundary.

By the mid-eleventh century, most of Wales had become united under the king of Gwynedd, Gruffudd ap Llywelyn. In 1055, he marched on Hereford and raided the city. He also seized Morgannwg and the Kingdom of Gwent, together with substantial territories east of Offa's Dyke, and raided as far as Chester and Leominster. He claimed sovereignty over the whole of Wales, a claim recognised by the English, and historian John Davies states that Gruffudd was "the only Welsh king ever to rule over the entire territory of Wales.". However, after his most powerful ally – Earl Elfgar of Mercia and East Anglia – died, Harold and Tostig Godwinson took advantage of the situation – Gruffudd being besieged in Snowdonia – and invaded Wales. In 1063, Gruffudd was killed by his own men. Harold returned many of the Welsh princes their lands, so that after Harold's death at the Battle of Hastings, Wales was again divided without a leader to resist the Normans.

=== March of Wales ===
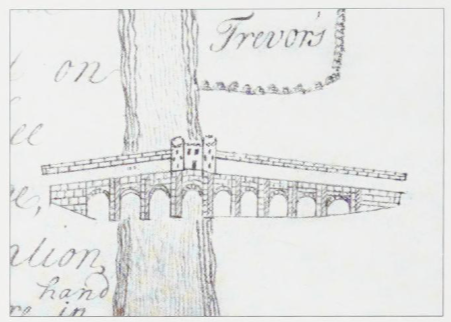
Farndon Bridge in the 18th century. The River Dee, marks the border between Farndon, England (left) and Holt, Wales (right)

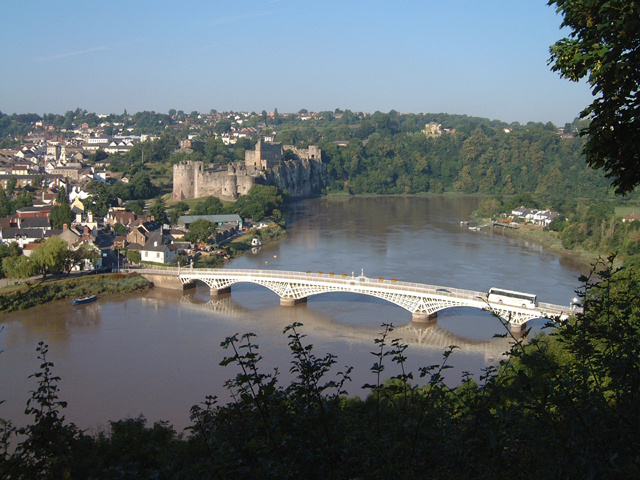
The River Wye, 1816 road bridge and castle at Chepstow. The river forms the boundary between Monmouthshire, Wales (left) and Gloucestershire, England (right)

Immediately after the Norman conquest of England, King William installed one of his most trusted confidants, William FitzOsbern, as Earl of Hereford. By 1071 he had started the building of Chepstow Castle, the first castle in Britain built of stone, near the mouth of the Wye. It served as a base from which the Normans continued to expand westward into south Wales, establishing a castle at Caerleon and extinguishing the Welsh kingdom of Gwent. William also installed Roger de Montgomerie at Shrewsbury, and Hugh d'Avranches at Chester, creating a new expansionist earldom in each case. In the Domesday Book of 1086, Norman lands are recorded west of the Wye at Chepstow and Caldicot in the Gwent Levels (Welsh: Gwent Is-coed); over the whole of north east Wales as far west as the River Clwyd, an area known to the Welsh as the Perfeddwlad; and west of Offa's Dyke, especially in Powys where a new castle was named, after its lord, Montgomery.

The Domesday Book records the extent of English penetration into Wales and suggests that Offa's Dyke still approximately represented the boundary between England and Wales. However, during the anarchy of Stephen various Welsh princes were able to occupy lands beyond it, including Whittington, Shropshire (see Whittington Castle) and Maelor Saesneg, hitherto in England. These lands were brought under English lordship by Henry II of England, but became Marcher lordships, and so part of Wales. This involved a loss of direct rule by the English crown.

Over the next four centuries, Norman lords established mostly small lordships, at times numbering over 150, between the Dee and Severn and further west. The precise dates and means of formation of the lordships varied, as did their size. Hundreds of small castles, mostly of the motte and bailey type, were built in the border area in the 12th and 13th centuries, predominantly by Norman lords as assertions of power as well as defences against Welsh raiders and rebels. Many new towns were established across the area, some such as Chepstow, Monmouth, Ludlow and Newtown becoming successful trading centres, and these tended to be a focus of English settlement. However, the Welsh continued to attack English soil and supported rebellions against the Normans.

Map of the Principality of Wales 1217 Principality of Wales Chester England and its Marcher allies

The Marches, or Marchia Wallia, were to a greater or lesser extent independent of both the English monarchy and the Principality of Wales, which remained based in Gwynedd in the north west of the country. By the early 12th century, they covered the areas which would later become Monmouthshire and much of Flintshire, Montgomeryshire, Radnorshire, Brecknockshire, Glamorgan, Carmarthenshire and Pembrokeshire. Some of the lordships, such as Oswestry, Whittington, Clun, and Wigmore had been part of England at the time of Domesday, while others such as the Lordship of Powys were Welsh principalities that passed by marriage into the hands of Norman barons. In ecclesiastical terms, the ancient dioceses of Bangor and St. Asaph in the north, and St. David's and Llandaff in the south, collectively defined an area which included both the Principality and the March, and coincided closely with later definitions of Wales.

The Principality of Wales (Welsh: Tywysogaeth Cymru) covered the lands ruled by the Prince of Wales directly, and was formally founded in 1216, and later recognised by the 1218 Treaty of Worcester between Llywelyn ab Iorwerth, Prince of Gwynedd, and King John of England. Encompassing two-thirds of modern Wales, the principality operated as an effectively independent entity from the reign of Llywelyn until 1283 (though it underwent a period of contraction during the early part of the reign of Dafydd ap Llywelyn in the 1240s, and again for several years from the beginning of Llywelyn ap Gruffudd's rule in 1246). Features of its independence were its separate legal jurisprudence based on the well-established laws of Cyfraith Hywel, and the increasingly sophisticated court of the Aberffraw dynasty.

The Statute of Rhuddlan in 1284 followed the conquest of the Principality by Edward I of England. It assumed the lands held by the Princes of Gwynedd under the title "Prince of Wales" as legally part of the lands of England, and established shire counties on the English model over those areas. The Council of Wales, based at Ludlow Castle, was also established in the 15th century to govern the area.

=== Formation of "England and Wales" and county boundaries ===
However, the Marches remained outside the shire system, and at least nominally outside the control of the English monarchy, until the first Laws in Wales Act was introduced in 1535 under Henry VIII. Henry had not seen the need to reform the government of Wales at the beginning of his reign, but gradually he perceived a threat from some of the remaining Marcher lords and therefore instructed his chief minister, Thomas Cromwell, to seek a solution. This, and a further Act in 1542, had the effect of annexing Wales to England and creating a single state and legal jurisdiction, commonly referred to as England and Wales. The powers of the marcher lordships were abolished, and their areas formed into new counties, or amalgamated into existing ones. At this point, the boundary between England and Wales, which has existed ever since, was effectively fixed. In the border areas, five new counties were created: Denbighshire, Montgomeryshire, Radnorshire, Brecknockshire and Monmouthshire; and Flintshire gained some additional territory. However, several of the marcher lordships were incorporated in whole or in part into English counties. The lordships of Ludlow, Clun, Caus and part of Montgomery were incorporated into Shropshire; and Wigmore, Huntington, Clifford and most of Ewyas were included in Herefordshire. According to John Davies:

Thus was created the border between Wales and England, a border which has survived until today. It did not follow the old line of Offa's Dyke nor the eastern boundary of the Welsh dioceses; it excluded districts such as Oswestry and Ewias, where the Welsh language would continue to be spoken for centuries, districts which it would not be wholly fanciful to consider as Cambria irredenta. Yet, as the purpose of the statute was to incorporate Wales into England, the location of the Welsh border was irrelevant to the purposes of its framers.

==== Changes to the border after 1536 ====
Changes after 1536
| Date | Details |
|---|---|
| 1543 | Aber-Tanat transferred to England from Wales |
| 1543 | Bewdley confirmed as part of Worcestershire |
| 1546 | Clun transferred to England |
| 1844 | Litton and Cascob transferred to England from Wales |
| 1844 | Bwlch Trewyn transferred to Wales from England |
| 1844 | Welsh Bicknor transferred to England from Wales |
| 1844 | Crooked Billet transferred to Wales from England |
| 1844 | Goodrich ferry transferred to England |
| 1857 | Threapwood incorporated partly into England and partly into Wales |
| 1887 | Stanford farm transferred to England from Wales |
| 1887 | Parts of the area around Ebbw Vale transferred to Monmouthshire from Wales |
| 1891 | Ffwddog transferred to Wales from England; known in English as 'the Fothock', it was an exclave of Herefordshire. |
| 1893 | Llanrothal CP transferred to England from Wales |
| 1896 | Part of Threapwood transferred to England from Wales |
| 1938 | Rumney transferred to Cardiff from Monmouthshire |
| 1974 | Monmouthshire incorporated into Wales |
| 1999 | The Dee Estuary boundary west of burton point is to be that of the shown on the 1888 os maps as opposed to the 1732 agreement. |
| 1999 | Severn Estuary boundary agreed upon |
| 2006 & 2010 | Maritime border further defined |

==== Conflict ====
- The 1605 Whitson riot occurred along the Herefordshire-Monnmouthshire border. Specifically the Monnow Valley where many illegal welsh recusants hid.
- Two battles occurred on bridges that cross the border, Farndon Bridge in 1643 and Chirk Bridge in 1831.
- Welsh pirate John Challice used Lundy as a base sometime between 1574 and 1581

==== The palatinate of Chester and Flint (Abolished 1830) ====
- Flintshire was not mentioned in the 1536 act, but instead in the 1543 act (after its boundaries had already been greatly altered) confirming its place in Wales. The palatine county lost its purpose after the acts, therefore its powers as well as its influence over Flintshire waned with new institutions such as the Council of Wales and the Marches taking responsibilities.
- Threapwood mentioned in the above chart was unclaimed land.
- The border near deeside is on recently reclaimed land, prior to 1700s the dee estuary reached the city of Chester.

==== Voting ====
- Due to outrage over plans for county reforms in 1971, the civil parish of Brilley was given the chance to vote on whether to join Wales or stay in England. They decided to remain in England.
- In 1887, at an inquiry at Overton, it was found that most of the population (of the English Maelor) favoured becoming part of Shropshire, and this was later supported by a resolution of the Flintshire justices of the peace. However, when local government legislation was introduced, no change was made.
- In 2008, residents of the village of Audlem, Cheshire, 9 miles (14 km) from the border, "voted" to become part of Wales with 80 for the change and 44 In opposition in what was originally a joke ballot. Some residents sought to make a case for securing Welsh benefits such as free hospital parking and prescriptions.

==== Border ====
- In the 1536 act "Cawrsland" was included as part of Montgomeryshire, yet this seems to have either never occurred or was immediately changed.
- A triangle of water to the south of Flat Holm is administered by Bristol County despite being within Wales. Additionally Denny Island and parts of the Welsh grounds along with some rocks further west are within England yet administered by Monmouthshire.(The national boundary is the newer invention)
- The Bristol county boundary no longer goes directly from the southern shore of denny island to "Aveneorde" but instead to a site further north.

=== Monmouthshire ===
Although Monmouthshire was included in 1535 as part of the "Country or Dominion of Wales" it was omitted from Wales in the 1542 Act of Union, which established the Court of Great Sessions, and like English shires it was given two Knights of the Shire, rather than one as elsewhere in Wales. The result being its legal status as a Welsh county falling into some ambiguity and doubt until the 20th century.However, in ecclesiastical terms, almost all of the county remained within the Diocese of Llandaff, and most of its residents at the time spoke Welsh. In the late 17th century under Charles II it was added to the Oxford circuit of the English Assizes, following which, according to the 1911 Encyclopædia Britannica, it gradually "came to be regarded as an English county". Under that interpretation, the boundary between England and Wales passed down the Rhymney valley, along Monmouthshire's western borders with Brecknockshire and Glamorgan, so including Newport, and other industrialised parts of what would now generally be considered to be South Wales, within England.

The 1911 Encyclopædia Britannica unambiguously described the county as part of England, but noted that "whenever an act [...] is intended to apply to [Wales] alone, then Wales is always coupled with Monmouthshire". Some legislation and UK government decisions, such as the establishment of a "Royal Commission on Ancient and Historical Monuments in Wales and Monmouthshire" in 1908, referred to "Wales and Monmouthshire", so that it was treated as one with Wales rather than as a legal part of Wales. The county's status continued to be a matter of debate in Parliament, especially as Welsh nationalism and devolution climbed the political agenda in the 20th century. In 1921 the area was included within the Church in Wales. The Welsh Office, established in 1965, included Monmouthshire within its remit, and in 1969 George Thomas, Secretary of State for Wales, proposed to fully incorporate Monmouthshire into Wales. The issue was finally clarified in law by the Local Government Act 1972, which provided that "in every act passed on or after 1 April 1974, and in every instrument made on or after that date under any enactment (whether before, on or after that date) "Wales", subject to any alterations of boundaries..." included "the administrative county of Monmouthshire and the county borough of Newport". The legal boundary between England and Wales therefore passes along Monmouthshire's eastern boundaries with Herefordshire and Gloucestershire, essentially along the River Monnow and River Wye.

== The border today ==
=== English and Welsh boundaries ===
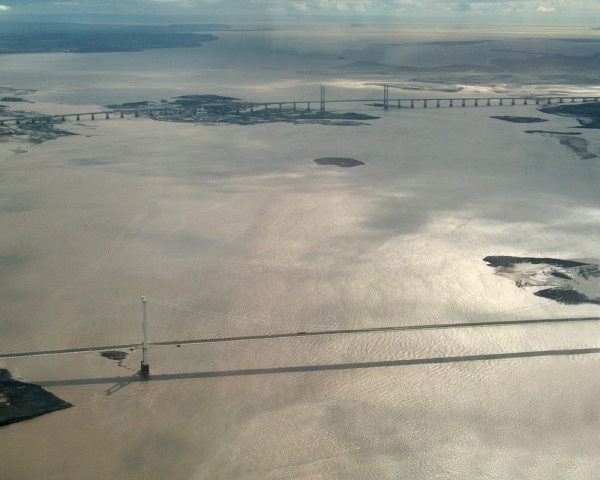
Looking southwest towards the Bristol Channel with England on the left and Wales on the right. The Second Severn Crossing is in the distance. The Severn Bridge is in the foreground.

The first legislation applying solely to Wales since the 16th century was passed in 1881. Subsequently, the border between England and Wales has taken on increasing legal and political significance.

Until the Welsh Disestablishment in 1920, the Diocese of St Asaph included parts of north-west Shropshire. The parishes transferred to the Diocese of Lichfield were: Criftins, Hengoed, Kinnerley, Knockin, Llanyblodwell, Llanymynech, Melverley, Morton, Oswestry, St Martins, Selattyn, Trefonen, Weston Rhyn and Whittington.

In 1965, a separate government department, the Welsh Office, was established for Wales, and it assumed an increasing range of administrative responsibilities. By 1992, the Welsh Office oversaw housing, local government, roads, historic buildings, health, education, economic development, agriculture, fisheries and urban regeneration, although the extent to which it was autonomous from England in public policy is a matter of debate.

The establishment of devolved government in Wales through the Welsh Assembly, set up in 1999, has led to a divergence between England and Wales on some government policies. For example, prescription charges were abolished in Wales in 2007. The modern border lies between the town of Knighton and its railway station, and divides the village of Llanymynech where a pub straddles the line. Knighton is the only town that can claim to be on the border as well as on Offa's Dyke. The postal and ecclesiastical borders are in places slightly different – for example the Shropshire village of Chirbury has Montgomery as its post town, and the Welsh town of Presteigne is in the English Diocese of Hereford.

National League North football club Chester F.C.'s ground at Deva Stadium straddles the border, with the car park and some of the offices in England but the pitch in Wales. In the 2021–22 season, the club was threatened with legal action for failing to apply the COVID-19 regulations applying in Wales and allowing crowds to attend matches at the ground.

In Saltney, near Chester, there is a street called Boundary Lane that runs down the England-Wales border. There are a number of houses on the street that straddle both countries, with the majority of residents living in England or Wales, depending on which side of the street they reside in.

A competition was launched in 2005 to design one or more new iconic images, along the same lines as the "Angel of the North", to be placed at the borders of Wales. This became known as the "Landmark Wales" project, and a shortlist of 15 proposals was unveiled in 2007. However, the proposal was shelved after it failed to receive Lottery funding.

The main road links over the border in the south are the M4 Second Severn Crossing and the M48 Severn Bridge. In July 2017, the Welsh Secretary, Alun Cairns, announced that tolls would be abolished at the end of 2018, claiming that this would boost the South Wales economy by around £100m a year. In September 2017, Cairns confirmed that tolls would be reduced in January 2018 when VAT was removed. All tolls ceased on 17 December 2018.

== Place names ==
In general, placenames of Welsh origin are found to the west of the Dyke, and those of English origin to the east. Therefore, many historically Welsh names are also found east of the border, particularly around Oswestry in northern Shropshire, such as Gobowen and Trefonen; in southern Shropshire, such as Clun; and in southern Herefordshire, such as Kilpeck and Pontrilas. Most of these areas were not incorporated fully into England until the 16th century, and native Welsh speakers still lived there until at least the 19th century. Equally, placenames of English origin can be found on the Welsh side of the border where there was Mercian and Norman settlement, particularly in the north east, such as Flint, Wrexham and Prestatyn; in English Maelor, such as Overton; in central Powys, such as Newtown and Knighton; and in southeastern Monmouthshire, including Chepstow and Shirenewton.

== See also ==
- Anglo-Scottish border
- Berwick upon Tweed
- Common Travel Area
- Church of England border polls 1915–1916
- Cross-border derby
- English–Welsh cultural relations
- Debatable lands
- History of Wales
- List of Anglo-Welsh Wars
- Little England beyond Wales
- Lloegyr
- Monmouthshire (historic)
- Offa's Dyke Path
- Republic of Ireland–United Kingdom border
- Severnside derby
- Welsh Marches
