= Monmouth New Hydro Scheme =

Coordinates: 51.8203°N 2.7241°W

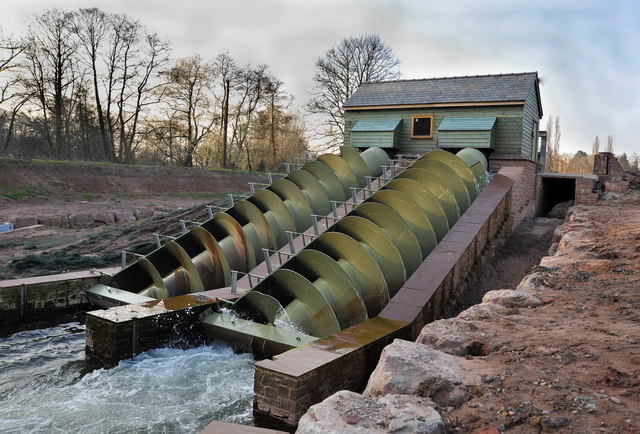
The power station in March 2009

The Monmouth New Hydro Scheme, which incorporates the Osbaston fish pass, is a hydroelectric scheme in Osbaston, near Monmouth, in South-East Wales.

== Description ==
The scheme produces 670,000 kW hours of electricity per year, which is enough to power 152 homes. It also provides heat for the landowner. The scheme is built around two screw turbines. These Archimedes' screws are operating in reverse, with water flowing down, to power generators. An earlier hydroelectric power station had been on the site from 1896 until 1953, which itself was built on the foundations of an even older forge. Alongside the scheme is the Osbaston fish pass, built by the Environment Agency Wales at a cost of £600,000. The fish pass allows river-spawning fish, such as salmon, to access an extra 125 miles of river - something which they had not been able to do since Osbaston Weir was put in place in the 18th century.

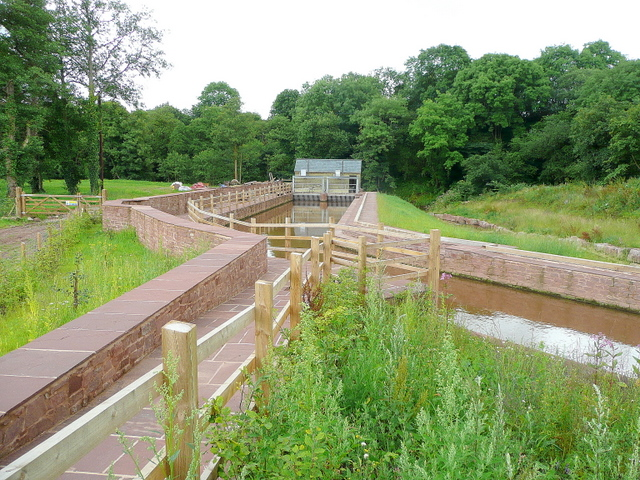
Osbaston Weir

The power station was officially opened on 23 September 2009 by the Earl of Wessex. Several months later, in June 2010, local schoolchildren released salmon into the River Monnow at the site of the power station - the salmon were initially reared at their school, Osbaston Primary School, as part of a class project. Once the salmon became fry, they were taken to Cynrig Hatchery, in Brecon. The fish pass is not only used by salmon, but also larger creatures - in June 2010, a camera set up at the site of the fish trap caught footage of an otter swimming through the trap.
