= Bryn Arw =

Hill (384m) in Monmouthshire, Wales

Coordinates: 51.8715°N 3.0116°W

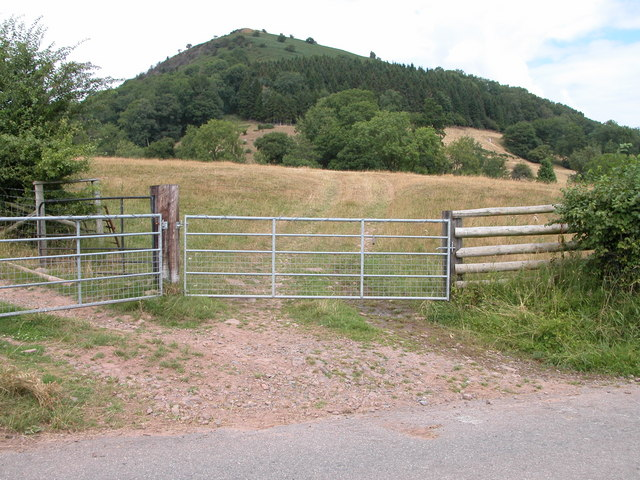
Bryn Arw

Bryn Arw is a hill in the Black Mountains of the Brecon Beacons National Park in Monmouthshire, south Wales. It lies 4 km north of the town of Abergavenny and 1.5 miles west of the village of Llanvihangel Crucorney. Its summit at 384m (1260 feet) above sea level is the more northerly of two tops which lie on the crest of a slightly arcuate north-south ridge which drops away to the south at first gently and then sharply. The hill is isolated from the main mass of the range by the valleys of Cwm Coed-y-cerig to the north and by Cwm Brynarw to the west. It is a Marilyn.

== Geology ==
The hill is composed from mudstones and sandstones of the Senni Beds Formation of the Old Red Sandstone laid down during the Devonian period. A number of small fossil landslips can be seen around its flanks, notably at its northwestern and southwestern points where the slopes are steepest.

== Access ==
The hill is designated as open country so freely accessible to walkers. Public footpaths run around its base for all but a short section of its western flank whilst further paths link from the nearby road network.
