= Black Hill (Herefordshire) =

Mountain in Herefordshire, England

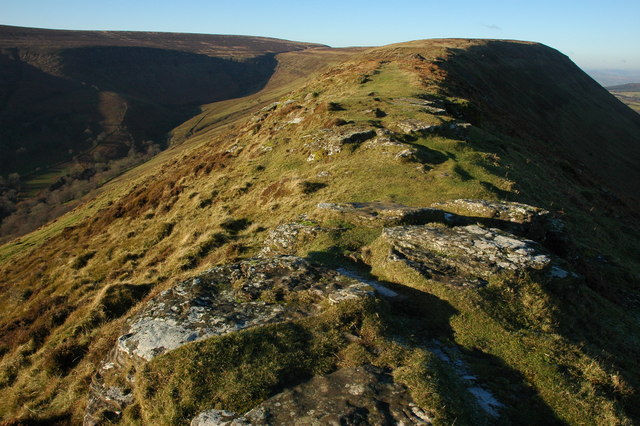
- Black Hill

Highest point
- Elevation: 640 m (2,100 ft)
- Coordinates: 52°00′26″N 3°03′24″W

Geography
- Location: Herefordshire, England
- Parent range: Black Mountains
- OS grid: SO274348

The Black Hill (also known as Crib y Garth) is a hill (elevation 2100 feet or 640m) in the Black Mountains in Herefordshire, England at grid reference SO275348. It rises just west of the village of Craswall, near the border with Wales. The southern part of the ridge leading to the summit is a rocky knife-edge giving excellent views to either side. The northern part crosses a peat bog on gently sloping land at the edge of the east facing escarpment. The lower part is very similar to the main ridge of the Skirrid mountain near Abergavenny, owing to their similar underlying geology. The Black Hill is known locally as the 'Cat's Back,' as viewed from Herefordshire it looks like a crouching cat about to pounce.

== Access ==
There is a very small parking (room for about 6 cars) and picnic area at the southern tip of the ridge, at the far end of minor roads leading from Longtown, Herefordshire. It is signposted at a road junction north of Longtown, and is shown on most Ordnance Survey maps of the area. The parking area lies to the north of the Little Back Hill. The access roads are however, narrow and all single track, although there are numerous passing places. The walk from the car park along the ridge to the trig point which marks the top of the hill is clear and easily followed in good weather, with two large cairns beyond the rocky outcrops along the Cat's Back. There is a small pool in the peat near the summit, its size depending on local rainfall. The path can be continued on a well marked and visible track to Hay Bluff, a prominent peak above Hay-on-Wye and the Gospel Pass. The path crosses several peat bogs and there is a small pool near the summit itself. Return can be made along the ridge or by a diversion along the Offa's Dyke Path along the Hatterall Ridge, and then by descent into the valley of the river Olchon. There is a direct route from the ridge which follows the river Olchon via an old bridleway, and leads on to the minor road which circles the valley. It is marked by a small cairn by the main path, and the path crosses at one point a rocky landslip by the side of the stream. The ridge is common land and thus open to all both on and off the several paths on the hill. It is grazed by sheep, ponies and cattle.

== Geology ==
The distinctive shape of this Old Red Sandstone hill comprises a long ridge oriented roughly north-west/south-east. The upper slopes of the hill are composed of Devonian period sandstones, assigned to the Senni Formation. They overlie weaker mudstones of the St Maughans Formation - a situation which has contributed to the instability of the hill's steep flanks, resulting in small landslips at various points on the ridge. There are numerous other landslips of a similar nature on the nearby hills, especially that at Black Darren and Red Darren at the edge of the Hatterall Ridge to the south west, where the great size of the slippage dominates the side of the mountain. There are many rock tables on the ridge of the Black Hill, where structural details such as rock jointing, can be seen more closely.

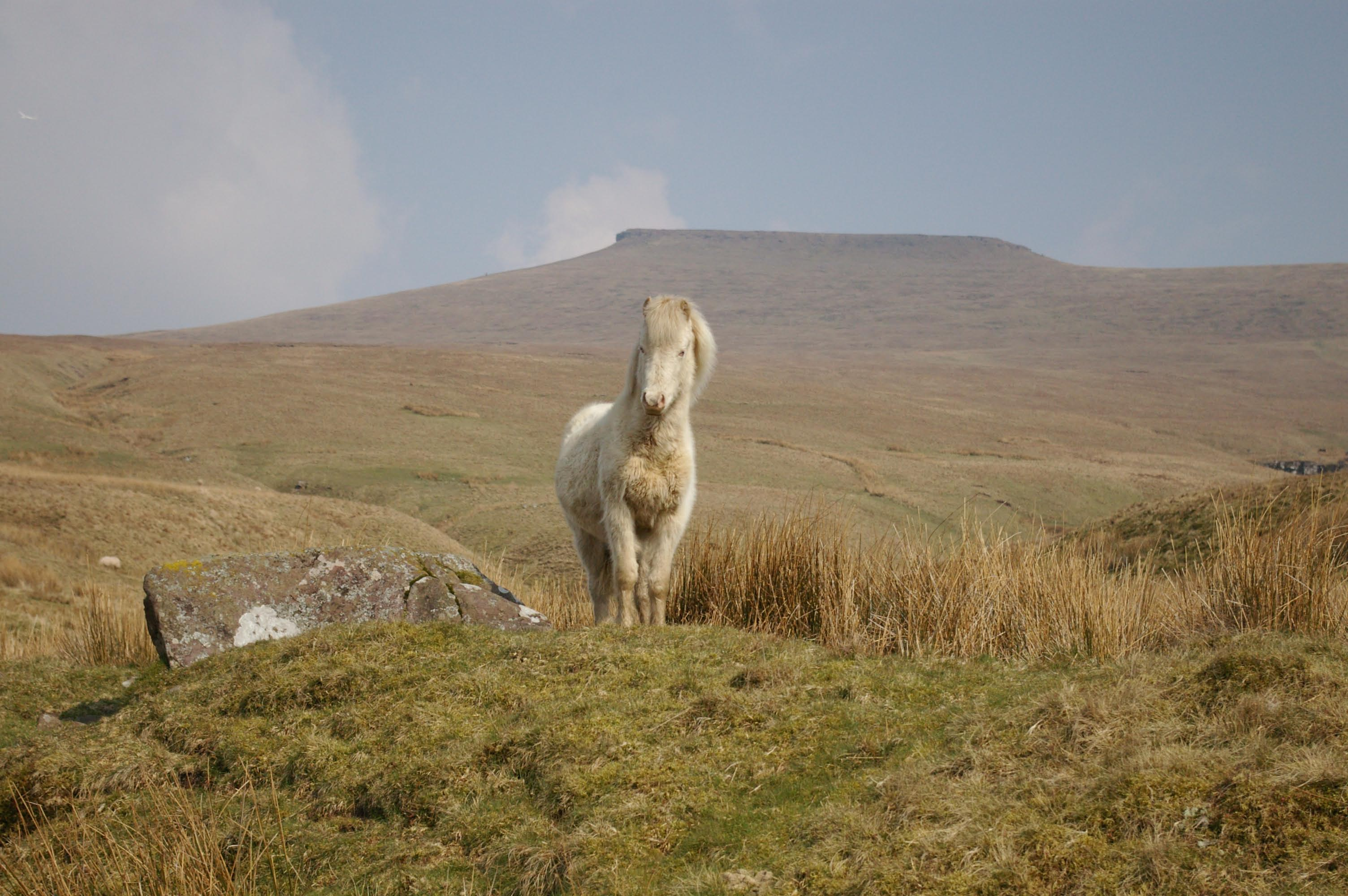
A Welsh mountain pony, a common sight in the Black Mountains

== Wildlife ==
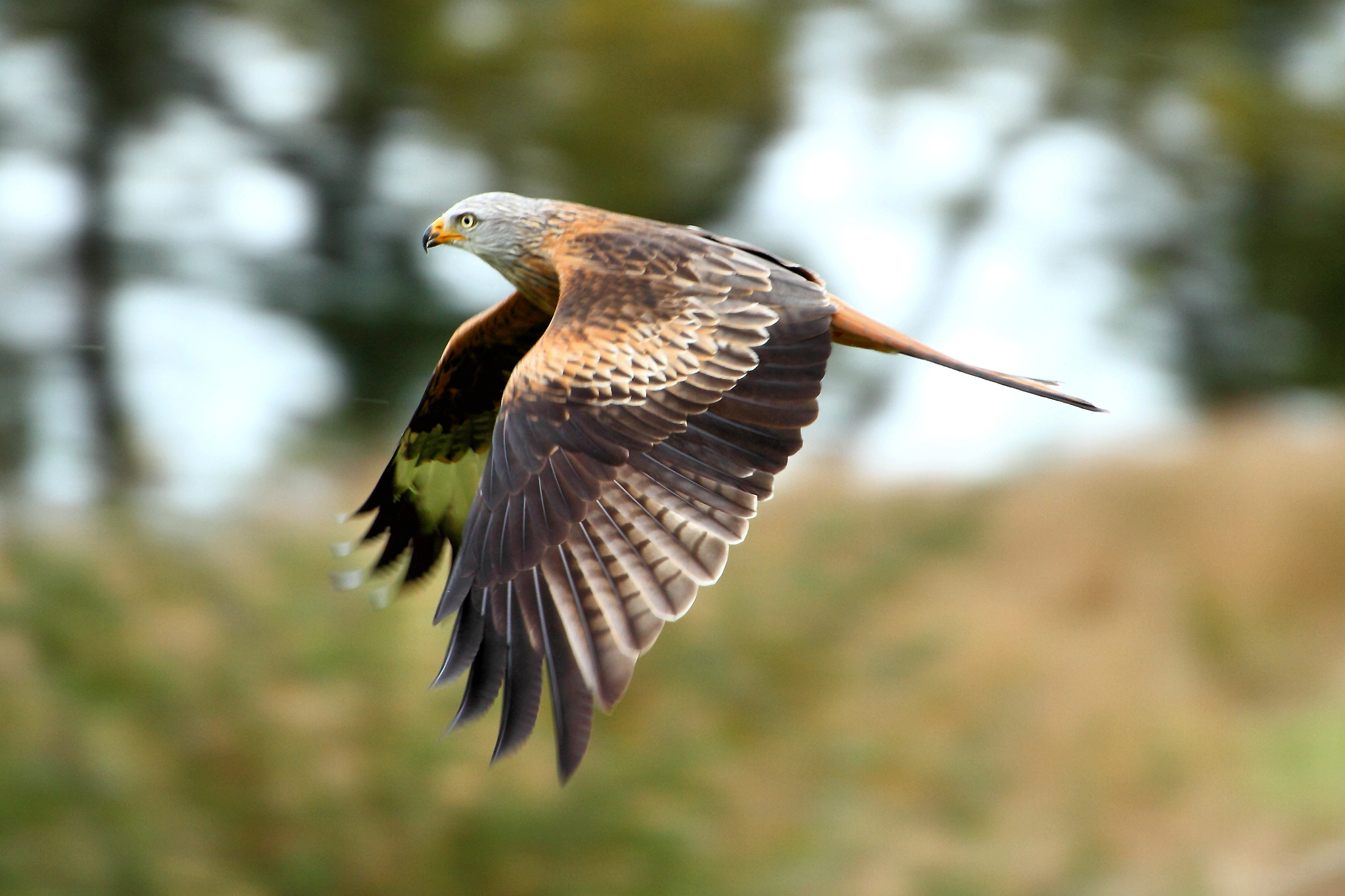
Side view of adult red kite, Wales

There are numerous different species of bird in the area, and they include the red kite, common buzzard, kestrel, carrion crow, common raven and skylark. The red kite was previously restricted to this and adjoining areas in South Wales such as Mynydd Mallaen, but has since been introduced widely in southern Britain, such as the Chilterns. The kestrel and buzzard are widely distributed, but the raven is restricted to the higher mountains. The birds of prey can often be seen riding thermals or updraughts at the edges of the hill.

== Fiction ==
Bruce Chatwin used the Black Hill as the setting for his novel On the Black Hill in 1982.
