= River Monnow =

River in Herefordshire and Monmouthshire, United Kingdom

Coordinates: 51.80565°N 2.71371°W

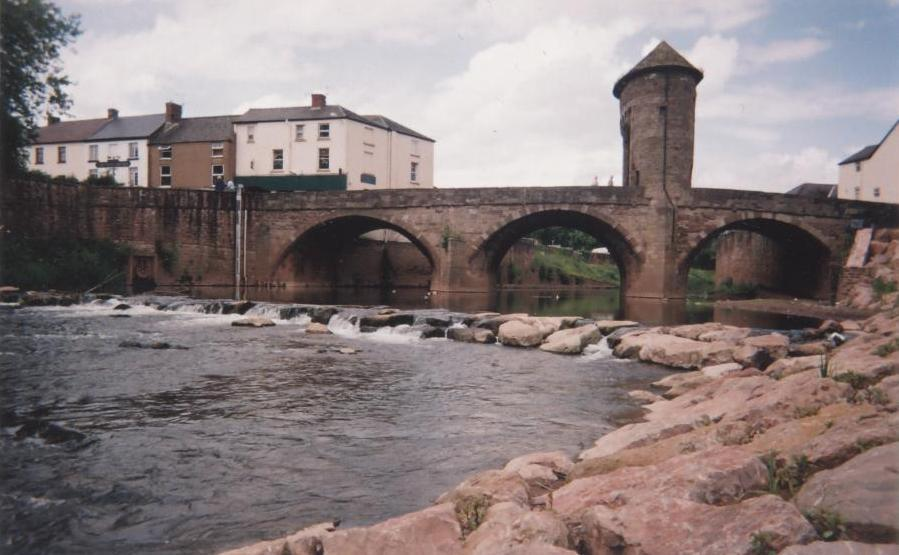
- The Monnow Bridge in Monmouth
- Native name: Afon Mynwy (Welsh)

Location
- Country: Wales, England

Physical characteristics
- Length: 42 mi (68 km)

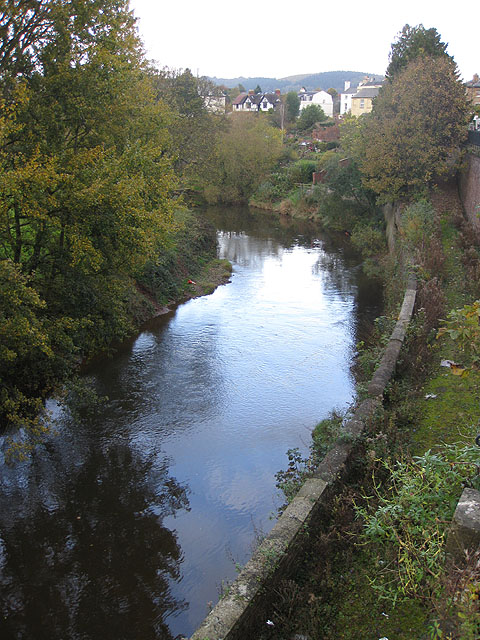
Upstream as seen from Priory Street, Monmouth

The River Monnow (Welsh: Afon Mynwy) marks the England–Wales border for much of its 42 miles (68 km) length. After flowing through southwest Herefordshire, England, and eastern Monmouthshire, Wales, its confluence with the River Wye is approximately 1/3 mile (0.54 km) south of Monmouth.

The Monnow rises near Craswall on Cefn Hill just below the high Black Mountains, Wales. It flows southwards, gaining the waters of its tributaries the Escley Brook and Olchon Brook near Clodock and the waters of the River Honddu, from the Welsh side of the Black Mountains, near Pandy. The river then flows briefly eastwards, to Pontrilas, where it is joined by its largest tributary, the River Dore before again turning southwards. At Monmouth, the Monnow joins into the River Wye with the River Trothy. The unique medieval Monnow Bridge in Monmouth is the only remaining fortified river bridge in Great Britain with its gate tower standing on the bridge.

The 40 miles (64 km) long-distance Monnow Valley Walk follows the river.

== Toponymy ==
The River Monnow derives its name from the Welsh "Myn-wy") and translates to "swift water". (myn means swift, and wy is one of the many Welsh words for water)

== Brown trout ==
At one time the river was noted for its substantial brown trout population, with the length from Pontrilas to Skenfrith producing record catches. Numbers fell substantially during the 20th century and especially after the 1960s but in more recent years the trout fishing has improved dramatically and the Monnow catchment once again ranks as one of the best wild trout fisheries in England and Wales and it is now also noted for the grayling fishing. A recently opened fish pass at Monmouth allowing migratory fish to by-pass a previously impassable weir has once more given Atlantic salmon and sea trout access to the majority of the catchment and salmon were seen jumping at the now dismantled Kentchurch weir for the first time for many years in the Autumn of 2008. The Monnow Rivers Association works to improve fishing habitats on the river and to encourage responsible fishing.

== Hydroelectric power ==
At Osbaston, immediately north of Monmouth, the Monmouth New Hydro Scheme harnesses the flow of the Monnow to provide 670,000 kWh of electricity per year. The Osbaston fish pass facilitates the passage of river-spawning fish and other species past what would otherwise be an obstruction.

== See also ==
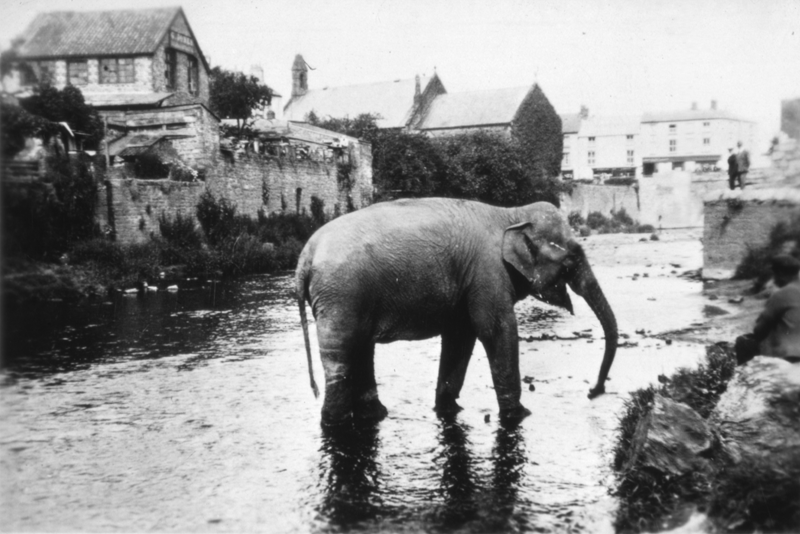
Elephant escaped from the mop fair as they were leaving Monmouth. St Thomas Church in the background (1930)

- Rivers of the United Kingdom
