= Longtown, Herefordshire =

Village in Herefordshire, England

Coordinates: 51.952°N 2.983°W

Longtown
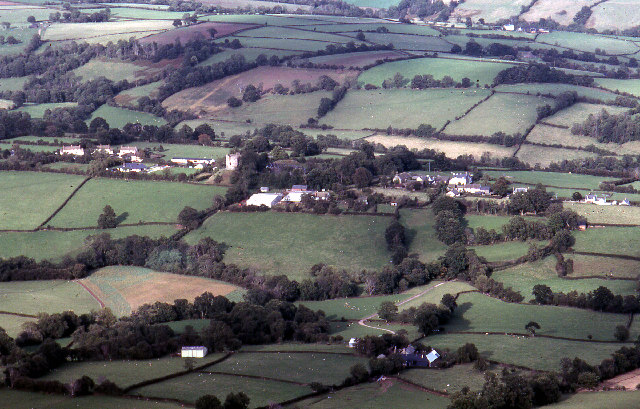
- View of Longtown from the ridge of the Black Mountains

- Location within Herefordshire
- Population: 620
- Unitary authority: Herefordshire
- Ceremonial county: Herefordshire
- Region: West Midlands
- Country: England
- Sovereign state: United Kingdom
- Post town: Hereford
- Postcode district: HR2
- Dialling code: 01873
- Police: West Mercia
- Fire: Hereford and Worcester
- Ambulance: West Midlands
- UK Parliament: Hereford and South Herefordshire

Longtown is a linear village and parish in Herefordshire, England. The parish includes the village of Clodock and had a population in mid-2010 of 543, increasing to 620 at the 2011 Census.

== Location ==
Longtown is located 10 miles (16 km) north east of Abergavenny and 14 miles (23 km) south west of Hereford on the eastern edge of the Black Mountains, Wales, part of the Brecon Beacons National Park. The extensive Hatterall Ridge lies about a mile to the west of the village, and the Black Hill (Herefordshire) two miles to the north. There are car parks at the feet of these mountains, a large one below Black Darren, a notable local landmark comprising a large landslip to the west of the town. There is a smaller car park below the Black Hill, and both are mainly used by walkers to access the hills. There are numerous footpaths and bridleways on the mountains, and they include Offa's Dyke Path, which runs north-south along the top of the Hatterall ridge.

== History ==
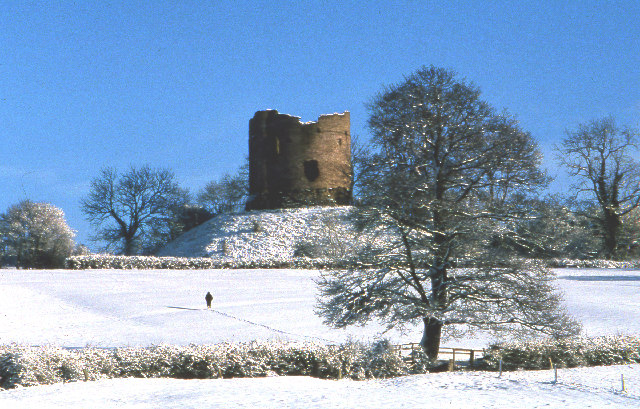
Motte and keep in the snow, 1978

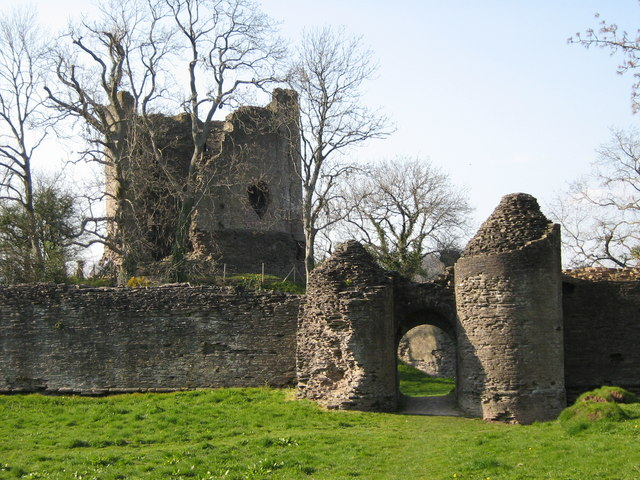
Motte and round keep with gatehouse in front

Longtown has an early Norman motte and bailey castle, Longtown Castle, and is so named because the settlement today is strung out along the lowland / winter road connecting Hay-on-Wye with the Abergavenny to Hereford road. The town was established as a Norman colony and protected by the castle.

Before 1536 Longtown was centre of the marcher lordship of Ewyas Lacy. Until 1866 it was a chapelry in the large ancient parish of Clodock (until 1852 in the Diocese of St Davids). The township or civil parish of Longtown includes the hamlet of Clodock.

== Amenities ==
Longtown Mountain Rescue based in nearby Abergavenny originated from staff of the Longtown Outdoor Centre in 1965 and are still ready to rescue people in difficulties on the upland ridges or lonely valleys of the Black Mountains in all seasons, such as the Hatterall Ridge to the west and the Black Hill (Herefordshire) to the north.
