= Black Mountain (hill) =

Mountain (703.6m) on Wales-England border, UK

- Twyn Llech (Welsh)
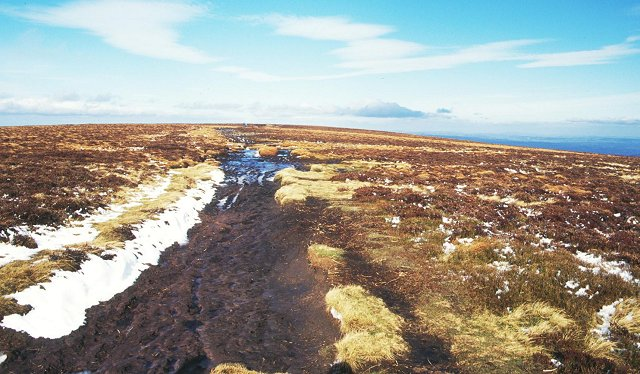
- The summit, crossed by the Offa's Dyke Path (prior to repair of erosion damage)

Highest point
- Elevation: 703.6 m (2,308 ft)
- Prominence: 155 m (509 ft)
- Parent peak: Waun Fach
- Listing: Marilyn, Hewitt, County Top, Nuttall
- Coordinates: 52°00′30″N 3°05′08″W

Geography
- Location within Wales
- Location: Herefordshire, England / Powys (former Brecknockshire), Wales
- Parent range: Black Mountains
- OS grid: SO255350
- Topo map: OS Landranger 161

Climbing
- Easiest route: The Cat's Back

Listed summits of Black Mountain (hill)
Name	Grid ref	Height	Status
Black Mountain South Top	SO267323	637 metres (2,090 ft)	Nuttall

The Black Mountain (Welsh: Twyn Llech 'hill of the stone') is a hill in the Black Mountains. It is the only Marilyn to fall exactly on the Welsh–English border, and it straddles Powys (Wales) and Herefordshire (England). Its parent peak, Waun Fach, lies to the west.

== Access ==
The Black Mountain is the highest point on Hatterrall Ridge. Offa's Dyke Path passes along the ridge, more or less from south to north. A steeper path leads to the summit from near the former youth hostel in the Vale of Ewyas to the west. The summit is unmarked and, because of the very shallow gradients along the summit ridge, virtually impossible to determine in situ. Open access to all the moorland here means that deviation from the paths is allowed. The ground is peaty and normally very wet even in good weather, especially on the highest ground.

It is the highest summit in England south of Great Whernside in the Yorkshire Dales, even though higher neighbours are very close by in Wales. However, some mountain lists, such as the Nuttalls, consider the mountain belongs only to Wales, due to the Black Mountains range being principally a Welsh massif.

== Geology ==
The upper parts of the mountain are composed of sandstones and mudstones of the Senni Formation of the Old Red Sandstone which is of Devonian age. The lower slopes are formed from the mudstone-dominated Freshwater West Formation (formerly the St Maughans Formation). A calcrete, the Ffynnon Limestone can often be seen at the interface of the two formations and is associated with a spring line.

The shape of the Vale of Ewyas to the south and west of the Hatterrall ridge strongly suggests that it was occupied by a glacier during at least one ice age, though not perhaps during the last ice age. The plateau was probably ice-free.
