= Vale of Ewyas =

Valley in Monmouthshire, Wales

Coordinates: 51.941°N 3.035°W

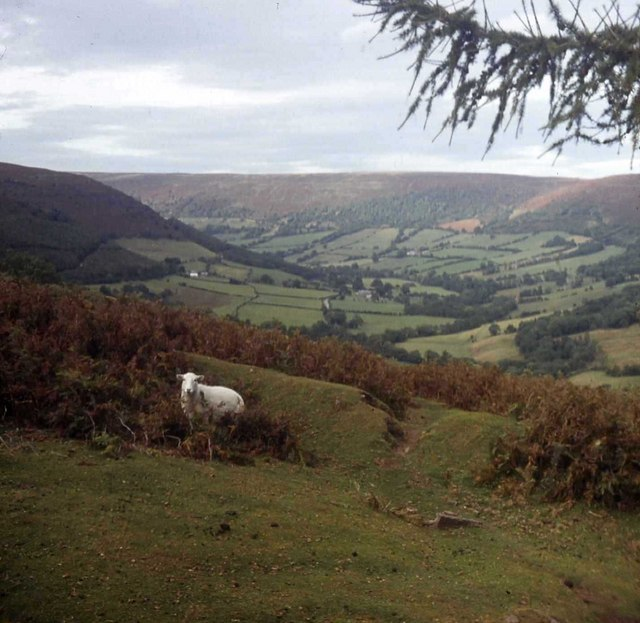
View up the Vale of Ewyas (Photo by Trevor Rickard)

The Vale of Ewyas (Welsh: Dyffryn Ewias) is the steep-sided and secluded valley of the River Honddu, in the Black Mountains of Wales and within the Brecon Beacons National Park. As well as its outstanding beauty, it is known for the ruins of Llanthony Priory, and for several noteworthy churches such as those at Capel-y-ffin and Cwmyoy. It is sometimes referred to as the "Llanthony Valley" as Llanthony is the village situated at the valley centre.

== Geography ==
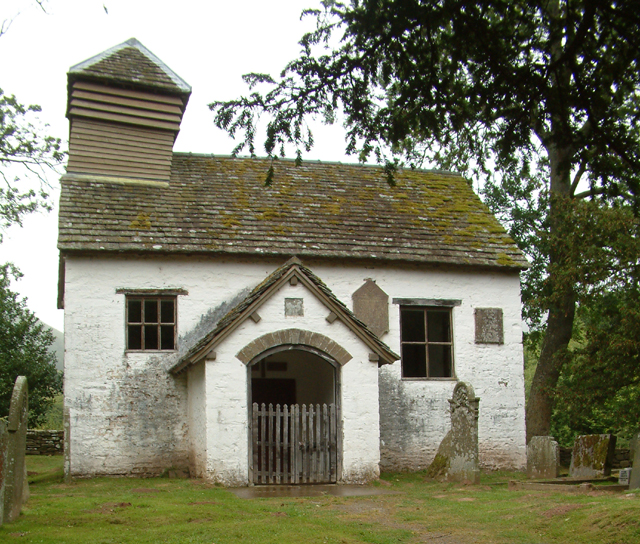
St Mary's Chapel

The Vale is named after the cantref of Ewias, which may have originally been a small Welsh kingdom following the Roman withdrawal from Britain and which, after the Norman conquest of England and Norman invasion of Wales, became an autonomous lordship within the March of Wales. In 1536, the Vale became part of the new county of Monmouthshire, while other parts of Ewyas to the east became incorporated into Herefordshire.

At the head of the Vale is the Gospel Pass, which is reputed to have been named after the time in the 12th century when the Third Crusade passed through the area preaching and fund raising. Nearby, at Capel-y-ffin, is an 18th-century church or chapel, one of the smallest in the country, and close to the former home of designer Eric Gill. Further south near the valley entrance, at Cwmyoy, the church there has suffered gradual subsidence over the centuries, and is best known for the disorienting tilts and twists of the building which add to its character. A few miles away, further into the Black Mountains, is Partrishow or Patricio, which has an outstanding 11th-century church.

Bruce Chatwin's book On the Black Hill depicts the upland livestock farming community over the past 100 years or so in the area. A locally born writer and academic Raymond Williams may well have set to restore the balance with his two books on the People of the Black Mountains, written a few years afterwards.

The Vale of Ewyas is accessed by a single track road between Llanfihangel Crucorney, near Abergavenny, and Hay-on-Wye. The northern part of the valley, above Capel-y-Ffin, is within the county of Powys (historically Brecknockshire), and the southern part within Monmouthshire.

== Llanthony Priory ==
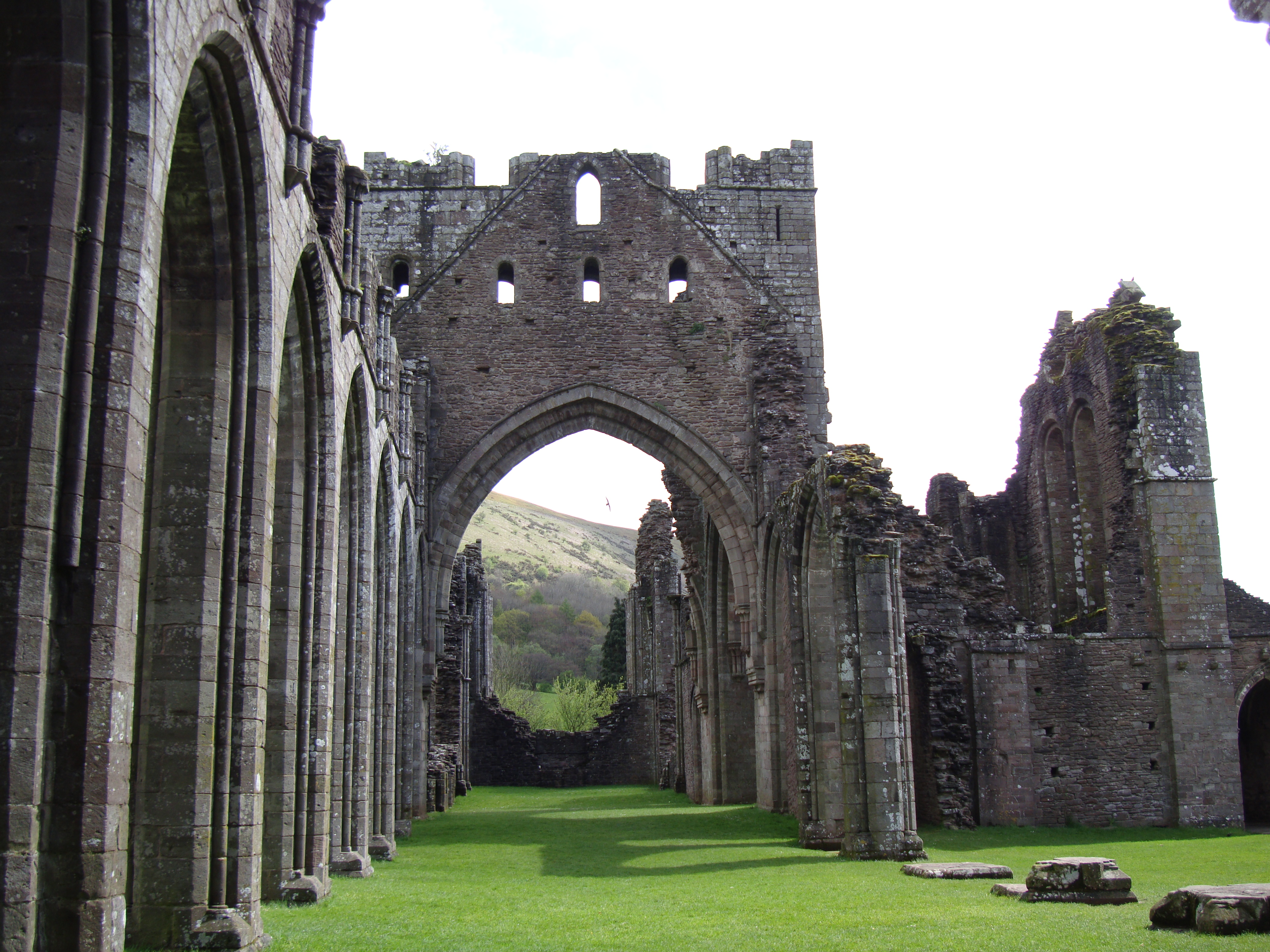
Llanthony Priory tower and nave

The Priory was formerly an Augustinian monastery until the dissolution of the Monasteries by Henry VIII. The ruins are protected by Cadw and access is free; however, dogs are barred from entering. The ruins were much painted in the 18th and 19th century, including and famously by J. M. W. Turner. The associated lodgings still attached to the ruins and known as The Abbey Hotel, are still used and there is a cellar pub where refreshments can be had during regular opening hours. The road from either Hay in the north or Llanfihangel Crucorney is, however, only a single track and delays may occur when the road is busy.
