= Hatterrall Ridge =

Ridge in England and Wales

Coordinates: 51.984°N 3.068°W

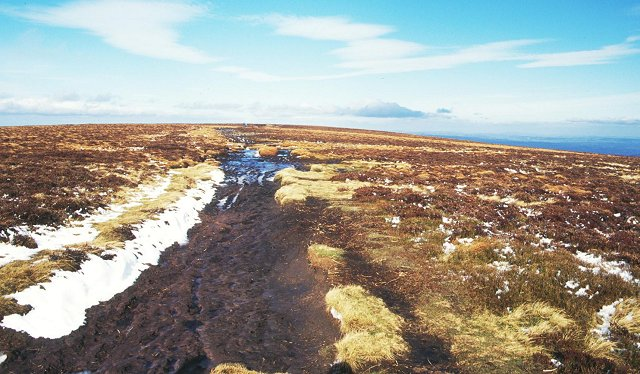
The summit of the Black Mountain on Hatterall ridge crossed by the Offa's Dyke Path

The Hatterrall Ridge (sometimes spelled Hatterall) is a ridge in the Black Mountains forming the border between Powys and Monmouthshire in Wales and Herefordshire in England. The ridge is about 10 miles (16 km) long, and is followed by the Offa's Dyke Path. On the west side of the ridge is the Vale of Ewyas, and on the east side is the Olchon Valley and Black Hill. The western side of the ridge falls within the Brecon Beacons National Park. Much of the northern part of the ridge is a broad whaleback, but it narrows down considerably further south, and especially near to Llanthony Priory in the Vale of Ewyas to the west of the mountain. There is a large and prominent landslip on the eastern side of the mountain here, known as Black Darren, where a large slice of the rocks has fallen away from the main mass of the hill.

The ridge to the southwest ends abruptly at the sheer cliff known as the Darren below which is a considerable landslide area extending south to the hamlet of Cwmyoy with its misshapen church.

== Peaks ==
The highest point on the ridge is Black Mountain (elevation 2306 feet or 703 m), near its northern end. Hatterrall Hill (elevation 1742 feet or 531 m) is near the southern end of the ridge. The path is surrounded by peat and often wet underfoot off the footpath, which itself has a dry stony surface. Lower parts of the ridge towards then south end are grass and heath covered, and generally drier than the high moorland. Since much of the ridge is unfenced common land, Welsh ponies and sheep can graze over large parts of the mountain.

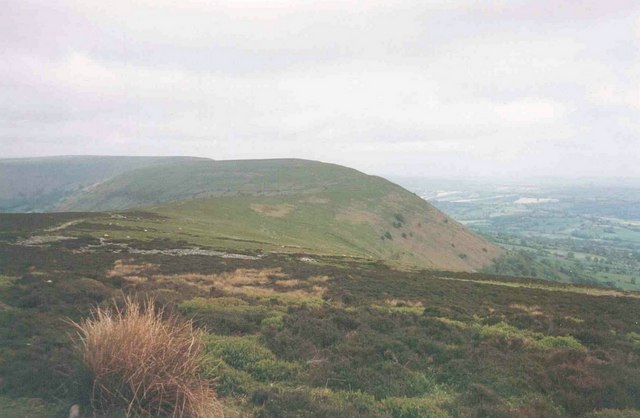
View looking north along Hatterrall Ridge from Hatterrall Hill

== Access ==
Offa's Dyke Path passes along the ridge, more or less from south to north, while a steeper path leads to the summit from near the former youth hostel in the Vale of Ewyas to the west. The path is well marked and surfaced over most of its length along the ridge, with stone pavements across very wet parts. The summit is unmarked and, because of the very shallow gradients along the summit ridge, virtually impossible to determine on site. However, there are several landmarks, such as a trig point, signposts, and stone cairns. There are many footpaths and bridleways which cross the main path along the back of the ridge, which give access both to the Vale of Ewyas to the west and the Olchon valley to the east. This enables many circular routes to be planned and used by ramblers.

The moorland has been designated open access land under the Countryside and Rights of Way Act 2000, so that deviation from the paths is allowed. The ground is peaty and often wet even in good weather, especially on the highest ground. The ridge is common land grazed by sheep, ponies and cattle.

The ridge is often used for paragliding and hang gliding when the wind is from the east or east-north-east.

== Geology ==
The hill is composed of sedimentary sandstones and mudstones of the Senni Formation of the Old Red Sandstone which is of Devonian age. The regular sequence of the strata can often be seen in quarries, or in the escarpments on either side of the ridge. It is most obvious in the exposures created by the local landslips, where selective erosion of weak strata has destabilized the rocks above. Numerous small quarries adorn its slopes, though all are now abandoned. The shape of the Vale of Ewyas to the south and west of the ridge strongly suggests that it was occupied by a glacier during at least one ice age, though not perhaps during the last ice age. The plateau was probably ice-free.

== Wildlife ==
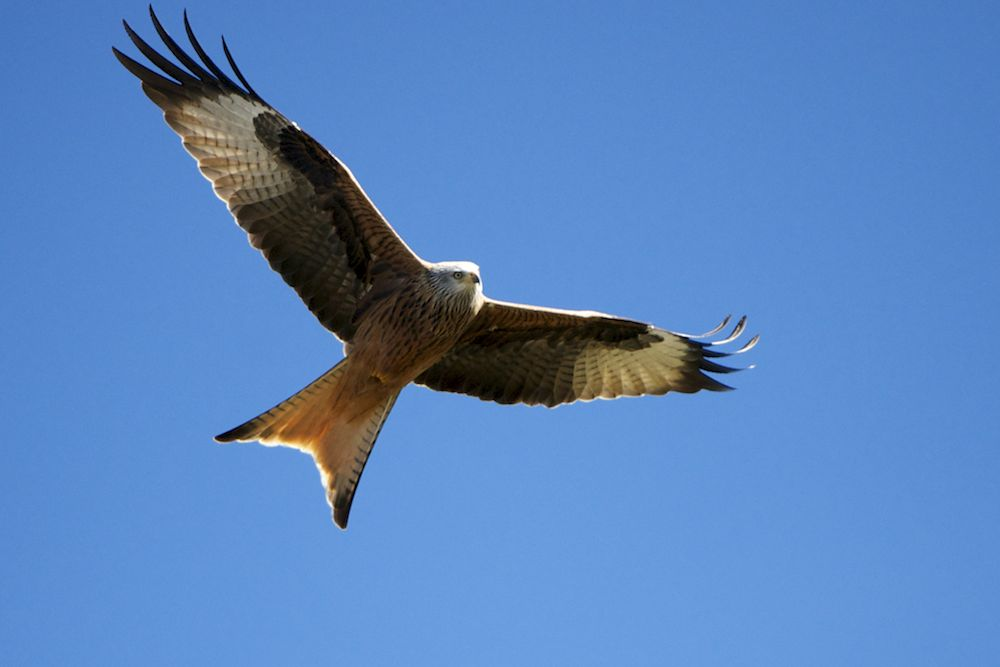
Red kite in flight in Gredos Mountains, Avila, Spain

The ridge hosts many different species of bird, including the red kite, common buzzard, the raven and carrion crow among the larger birds. Rabbits are common on the lower slopes, as are foxes and badgers.
