= Llanthony =

Village in Monmouthshire, Wales

Coordinates: 51.95°N 3.0333°W

Llanthony: Welsh: Llanddewi Nant Hodni
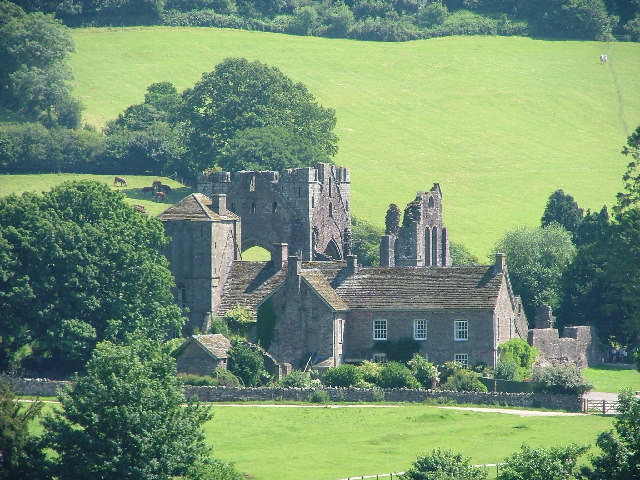
- Llanthony Priory

- Location within Monmouthshire
- Principal area: Monmouthshire
- Preserved county: Gwent
- Country: Wales
- Sovereign state: United Kingdom
- Police: Gwent
- Fire: South Wales
- Ambulance: Welsh
- UK Parliament: Monmouth

Llanthony (/lænˈtoʊni/, Welsh: Llanddewi Nant Hodni) is a village in the community of Crucorney on the northern edge of Monmouthshire, South East Wales, United Kingdom.

== Location ==
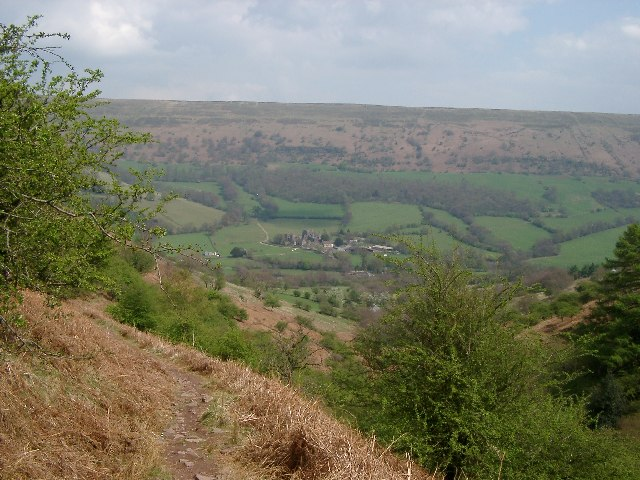
Footpath up from Llanthony.

Llanthony is located in the Vale of Ewyas, a deep and long valley with glacial origins within the Black Mountains, Wales, seven miles north of Abergavenny and within the eastern section of the Brecon Beacons National Park. The village is on an unclassified road leading northwards from Llanvihangel Crucorney to Hay-on-Wye.

== History ==
Llanthony Priory is situated here; it dates back to about 1100 when a Norman nobleman Walter de Lacy was inspired by an existing chapel to devote himself to solitary prayer and study. He was joined by others and a church was built on the site in 1108. By 1118, a group of about forty monks from England built the priory of Canons Regular, the first in Wales. It was raided regularly by the Welsh and was soon in decline; after Owain Glyndŵr's rebellion in the early 15th century, it seems to have become barely functioning. In 1481, it was formally merged with its daughter monastery at Gloucester then was later suppressed by Henry VIII's Dissolution of the Monasteries.

The Priory became one of the great medieval buildings in Wales, being built in a mixture of Norman and Gothic architectural styles. It is a Grade I Listed building, being "an important medieval monastic ruin with high quality surviving detail."

== Amenities ==
The area is popular for hillwalking, pony trekking, horseback riding and mountain biking.

The Offa's Dyke Path passes above on the ridge which forms the border between England and Wales.

== Notable residents ==
The painter and illustrator Reginald "Reg" Gammon (1894–1997) was a hill farmer here for twenty years.
