= South Wales Traverse =

Fell running challenge in south Wales

The South Wales Traverse is a long distance fell running challenge across the mountains of south Wales. It is a linear route of around 120 kilometres (75 mi) taking in some 31 summits over 610 metres (2,000 ft) high, providing around 5,500 metres (18,000 ft) of ascent.

The aim is for challengers to complete the route on foot within 24 hours. The route takes in the mountain ranges of the Black Mountain, Carmarthenshire Fans, Fforest Fawr, Central Brecon Beacons, and the Black Mountains, across most of the Brecon Beacons National Park. The selection of summits that must be visited is simply all peaks standing at over 610 metres (2,000 ft). Arguably, some of the peaks are points along the ridges rather than true summits in their own right but some consider this to add to the theme of a linear long distance challenge. Challengers may start at either end, but traditionally it is run from west to east so that both the prevailing wind can be from behind and 60% of the ascent can be completed in the first half.

The Traverse is considered by many who have completed it to be the Southern Britain equivalent of rounds like the Bob Graham. However, it has seen far fewer successful completions than these rounds (around 40 finishers by October 2020), due to the relatively low numbers of challengers who attempt it each year.

The fastest men's time for the Traverse is 14 hours 13 minutes by Damian Hall on 15 October 2020. The women's record is held by Helen Brown with a time of 18 hours 48 minutes set on 26 September 2020.

The challenge is used to be referred to as the "Brecon Beacons Traverse", but this only cites the relatively short section from Storey Arms to Talybont over the Central Beacons failing to recognise the wider significance of the challenge.

== Route ==
Below is a list of the summits that must be visited starting at Pen Rhiw-Wen running west to East.

Summit		Grid reference	Altitude/m
	Pen Rhiw-wen - A4069	SN 730184	495
1	Garreg Lwyd	SN 740179	616
2	Garreg Las	SN 777203	635
3	Bannau Sir Gaer	SN 811218	749
4	Fan Brycheiniog	SN 825218	802
5	Fan Hir	SN 830209	761
	Trecastell road	SN 853203	369
	A4067	SN 870195	387
6	Fan Gyhirych	SN 880190	725
7	Fan Nedd	SN 913184	663
	Sarn Helen/minor road junction	SN 925185	400
8	Fan Llia	SN 938186	632
9	Fan Frynych	SN 957227	629
10	Rhos Dringarth (Craig Cerrig-gleisiad)	SN 960217	629
11	Fan Fawr	SN 969193	734
	Storey Arms	SN 983203	445
12	Y Gyrn	SN 988215	619
13	Duwynt	SO 005207	824
14	Corn Du	SO 007213	873
15	Pen y Fan	SO 012215	886
16	Cribyn	SO 023213	795
17	Waun Rydd	SO 062205	769
18	Allt Lwyd	SO 078189	654
	Abercynafon	SO 083177	212
19	Cefn yr Ystrad	SO 086137	607
	Pyrgad	SO 101159	260
	Llangynidr - Red Lion	SO 155194	127
	Cwm-gu	SO 200209	190
20	Pen Cerrig-calch	SO 217223	701
21	Pen Allt-mawr	SO 206243	719
22	Mynydd Llysiau	SO 207279	663
23	Waun Fach	SO 215299	811
24	Pen y Gadair Fawr	SO 229287	800
25	Pen Twyn Mawr	SO 242267	658
	Grwyne Fawr (minor road)	SO 252285	407
26	Chwarel y Fan	SO 258294	670
27	Rhos Dirion	SO 211334	713
28	Twmpa	SO 224350	690
	Gospel Pass	SO 235352	550
29	Hay Bluff	SO 244366	677
30	Black Mountain	SO 255350	703
31	Pen y Garn Fawr	SO 277311	616
	Llanthony Priory51.943°N 3.038°W	SO 287279	241

== Route profile ==
Below is a profile of the route, again starting at Pen Rhiw Wen, running west to East.

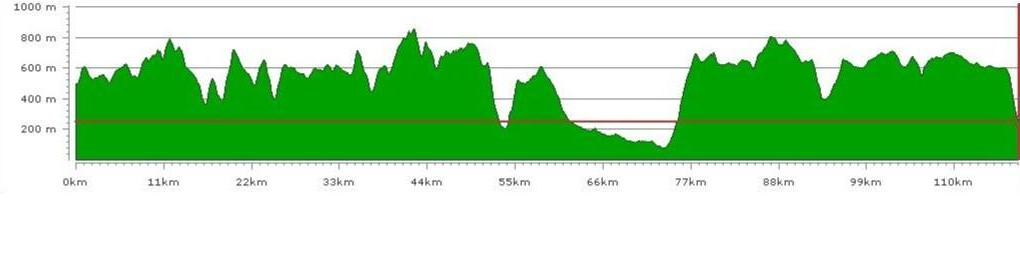
South Wales Traverse profile

== See also ==
- http://www.mdcwales.org.uk/Newsletter/Newsletter_2005/mdcnewsjuly2005.pdf - Mynyddwyr De Cymru newsletter article on a group traverse – page 4
