= Black Mountain South Top =

Coordinates: 52°00′30″N 3°05′05″W

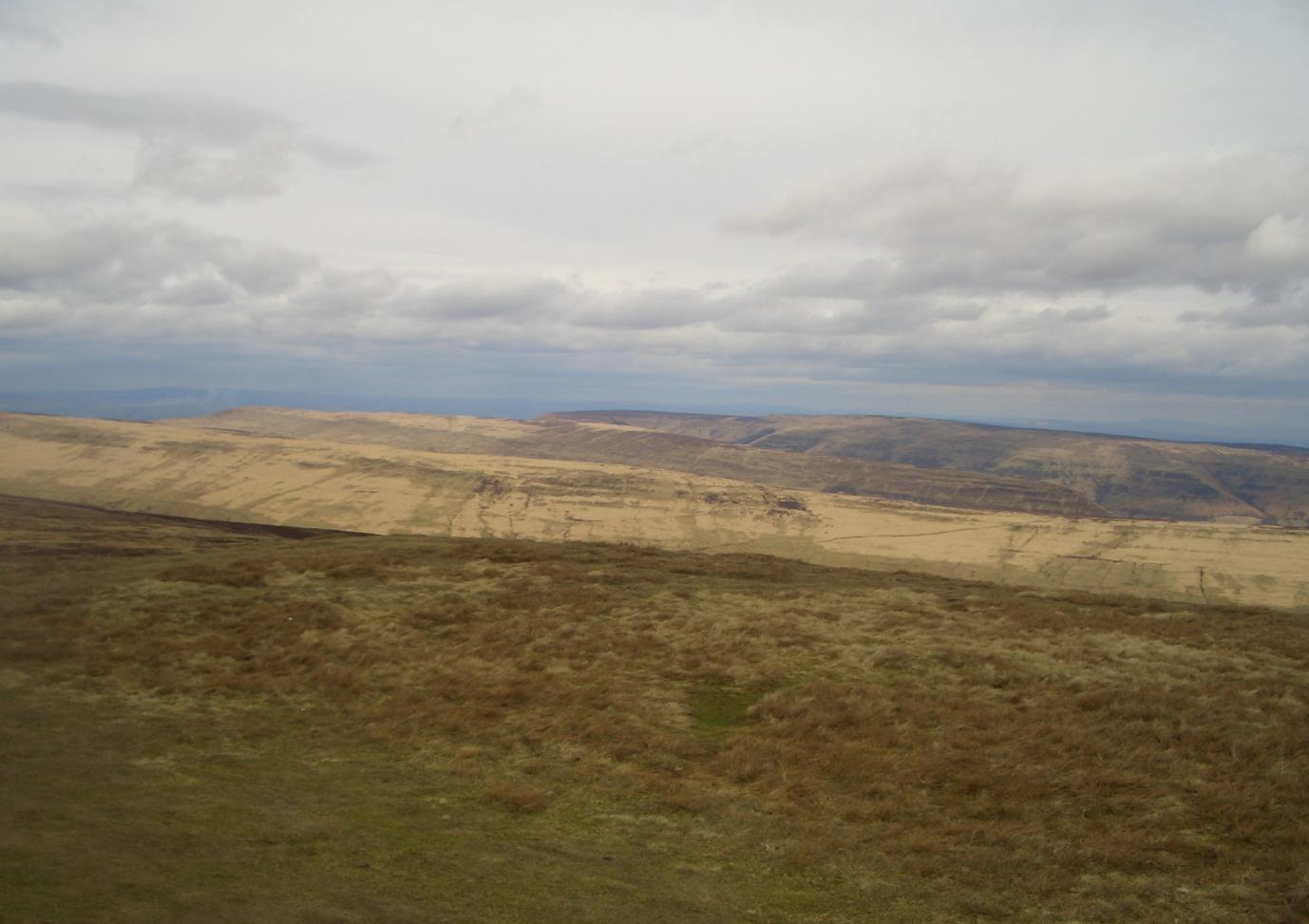
- Twmpa (closer ridge), Black Mountain with the South Top at extreme right, from Pen Twyn Mawr.

Highest point
- Elevation: 637 m (2,090 ft)
- Prominence: 15 m (49 ft)
- Parent peak: Black Mountain
- Listing: Nuttall

Geography
- Location: Herefordshire, England / Powys, Wales
- Parent range: Black Mountains
- OS grid: SO255350
- Topo map: OS Landranger 161

Climbing
- Easiest route: The Cat's back

Black Mountain South Top is a top of Black Mountain in the Black Mountains range that spreads across parts of Powys and Monmouthshire in southeast Wales. It is a top which falls exactly on the Welsh-English border, straddling Powys and Herefordshire. The Offa's Dyke Path passes over the summit.

The top is an undistinguished heathery bump on Hatterall Ridge. The summit is marked by a small pile of stones.
