= Pen Twyn Glas =

Hill (646m) in Powys, Wales

Coordinates: 51.96292°N 3.14392°W

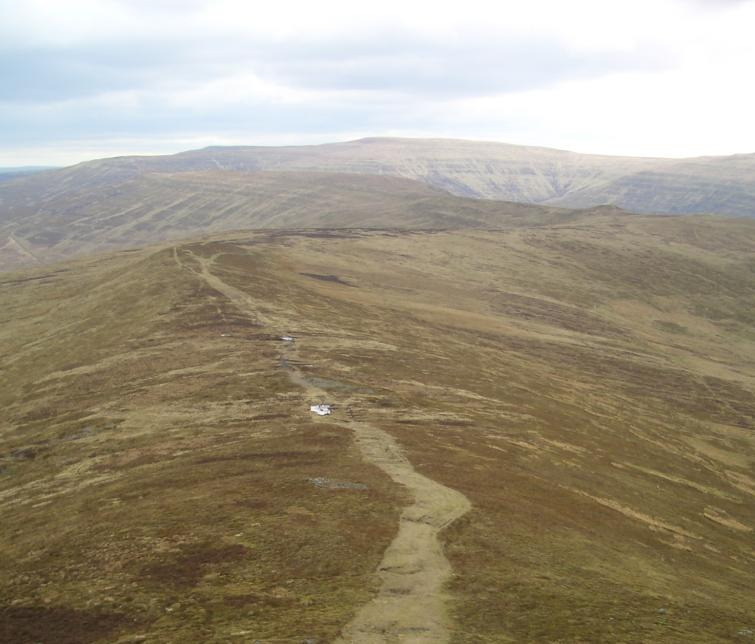
- Pen Twyn Glas, Mynydd Llysiau and Waun Fach from Pen Allt-mawr

Highest point
- Elevation: 646 m (2,119 ft)
- Prominence: 21 m (69 ft)
- Parent peak: Pen Allt-mawr
- Listing: sub Hewitt, Nuttall

Naming
- Language of name: Welsh

Geography
- Location: Black Mountains, South Wales
- OS grid: SO215300
- Topo map: OS Landranger 161

Pen Twyn Glas is a top of Pen Allt-mawr in the Black Mountains in south-eastern Wales. It lies in between Pen Allt-mawr and Mynydd Llysiau.

The summit is merely a grassy bump on the ridge marked by a pile of stones.
