= Llanbedr, Vale of Grwyney =

Village in Powys, Wales

Coordinates: 51.8768°N 3.1062°W

Llanbedr
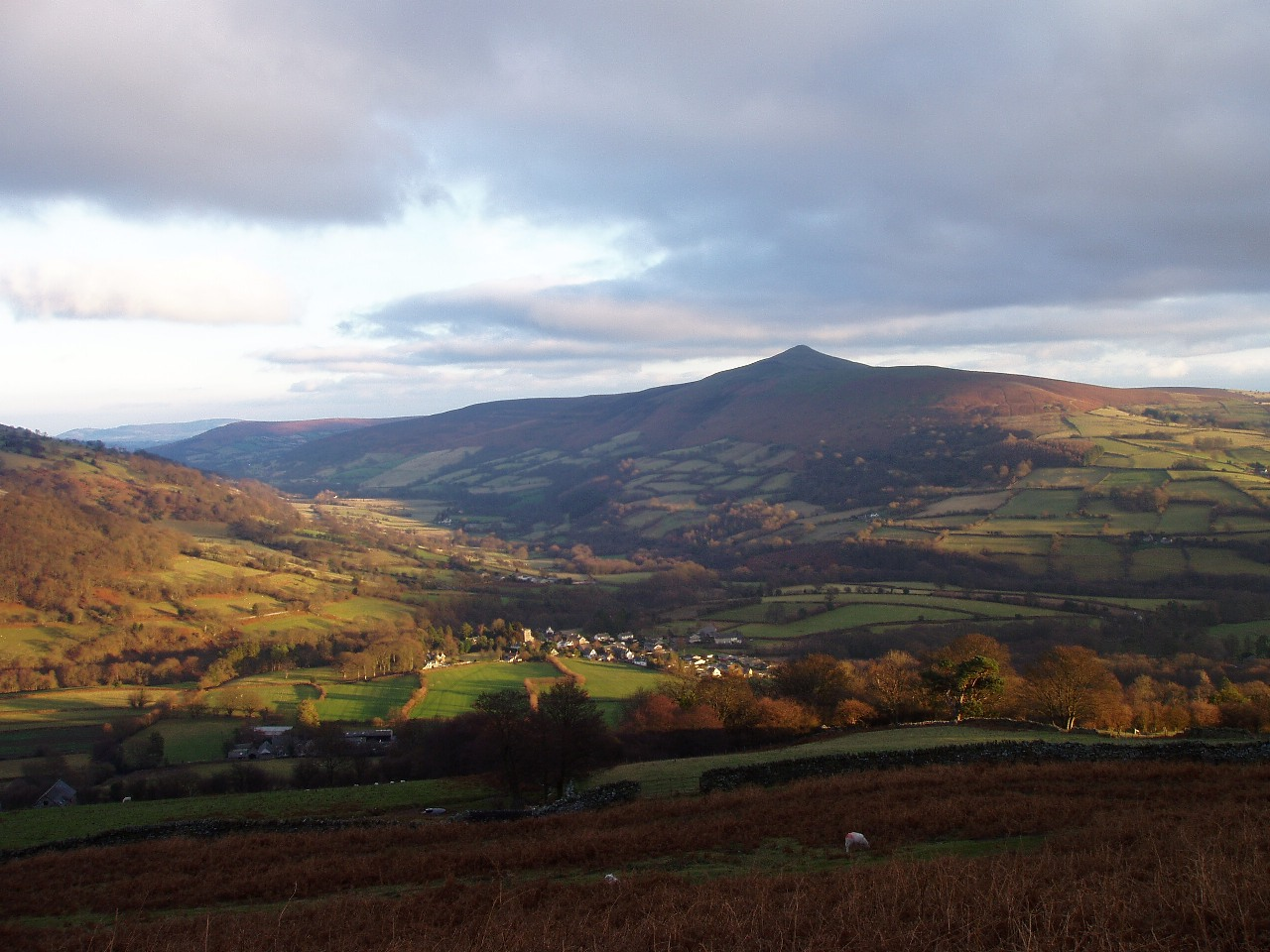
- Llanbedr from the west, with the Sugar Loaf in the background

- Location within Powys
- Community: Vale of Grwyney
- Principal area: Powys
- Country: Wales
- Sovereign state: United Kingdom
- Police: Dyfed-Powys
- Fire: Mid and West Wales
- Ambulance: Welsh

Llanbedr is a small village in the community of Vale of Grwyney, in the county of Powys, Wales, 2 miles (3 km) northeast of Crickhowell. It lies above the river known as the Grwyne Fechan just above its confluence with the Grwyne Fawr in the southern reaches of the Black Mountains range. The village lies within the shadow of Table Mountain, an outlying spur of Pen Cerrig-calch on which is perched the Iron Age hill fort of Crug Hywel.

The church of St Peter is a 14th-15th-century church in Perpendicular style. It has a number of interesting 18th-century memorials. There are also several examples of "Brute angels", carved by an 18th-century local family of stonemasons named Brute, inside and outside the church. A large hollow yew tree in the churchyard is reputed to be about 3,000 years old. The church is one of three in the Vale of Gwryne parish, in the St Catwg Ministry Area, together with Llangenny and Partrishow. It has a 14th-century bell tower with a peal of six bells, which are rung to mark notable events. A church is documented here in 1060, but this may have been an earlier building of which no trace now remains.

The village pub, located opposite the church, is the Red Lion.

== Gallery ==
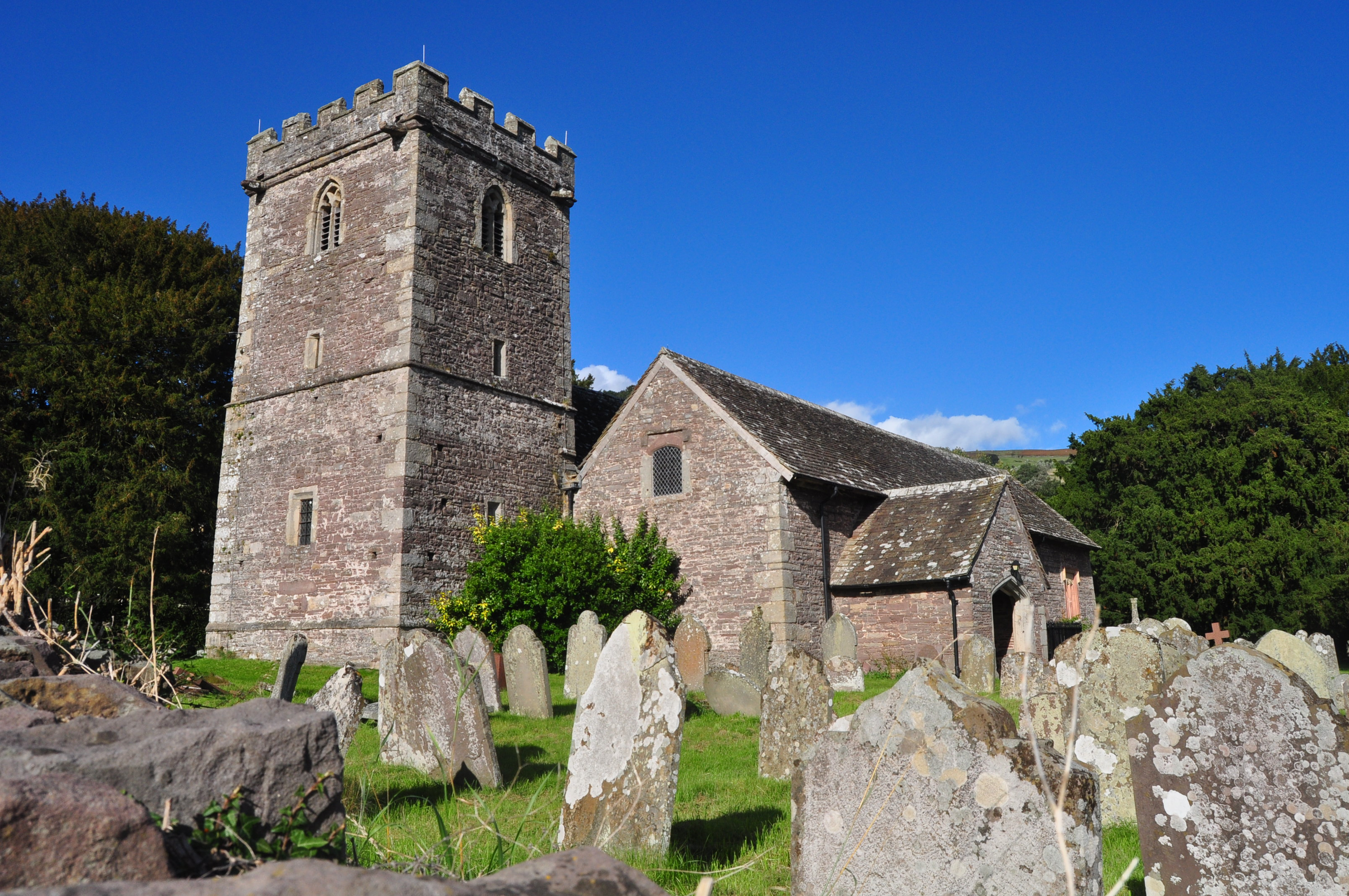
St. Peter's Church

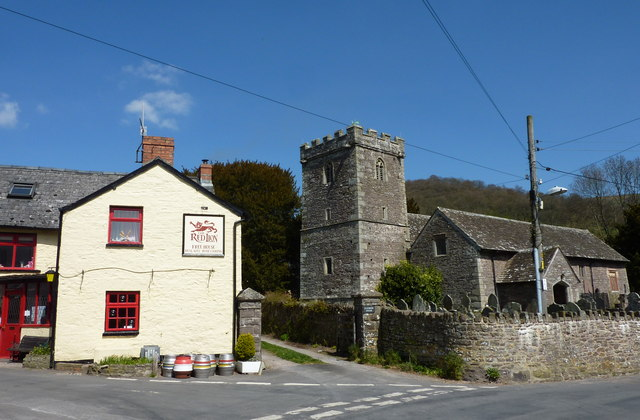
The Red Lion
