= Mynydd Llysiau =

Mountain (663m) in Powys, Wales

Coordinates: 51.96292°N 3.14392°W

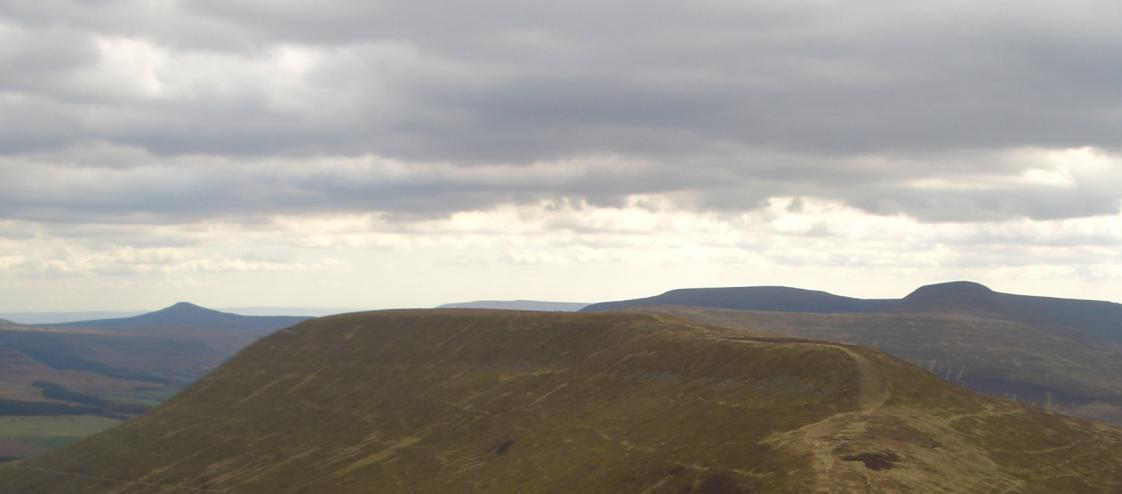
- Mynydd Llysiau from near Waun Fach. Behind are: Sugar Loaf (left) Pen Allt-mawr (right)

Highest point
- Elevation: 663 m (2,175 ft)
- Prominence: 40 m (130 ft)
- Parent peak: Waun Fach
- Listing: Hewitt, Nuttall

Naming
- English translation: mountain of the fruit
- Language of name: Welsh

Geography
- Location: Black Mountains, South Wales
- OS grid: SO215300
- Topo map: OS Landranger 161

Mynydd Llysiau is a subsidiary summit of Waun Fach in the Black Mountains in south-eastern Wales. It lies halfway between Waun Fach and Pen Allt-mawr. It is a distinguished summit with a steep eastern face.

The summit, marked by a pile of stones, is long grassy ridge. To the south is Pen Twyn Glas, before which are two boundary stones that resemble grave stones.
