= Pen Twyn Mawr =

Hill (658m) in Powys, Wales

Coordinates: 51.96292°N 3.14392°W

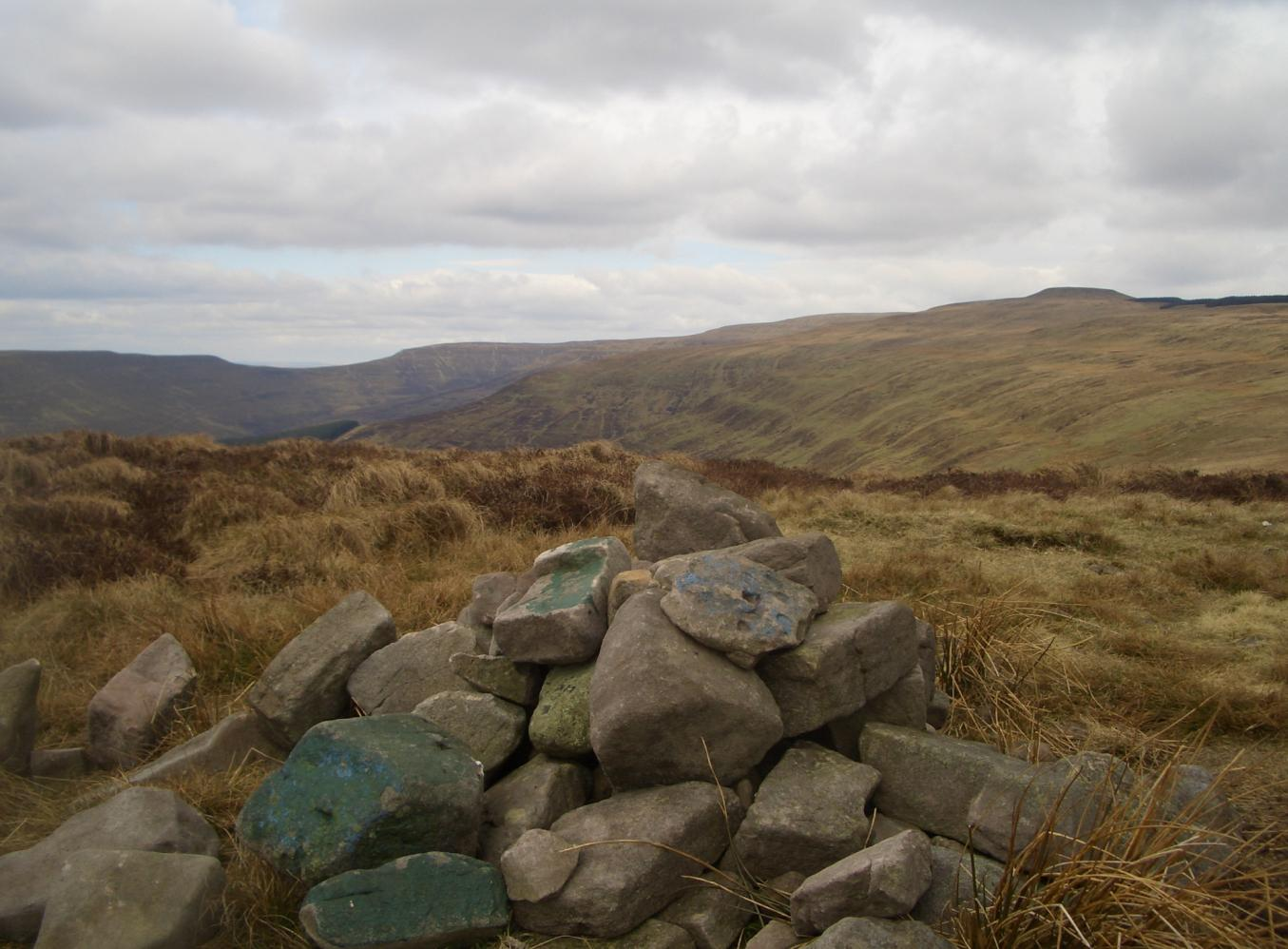
- Pen y Gadair Fawr from the summit of Pen Twyn Mawr

Highest point
- Elevation: 658 m (2,159 ft)
- Prominence: 17 m (56 ft)
- Parent peak: Pen y Gadair Fawr
- Listing: Nuttall

Naming
- Language of name: Welsh

Geography
- Location: Black Mountains, South Wales
- OS grid: SO241266
- Topo map: OS Landranger 161

Pen Twyn Mawr is a top of Pen y Gadair Fawr in the Black Mountains in south-eastern Wales. It lies on one of the many south ridges of Waun Fach.

The summit is marked by a pile of stones in an area of sandy soil and heather. Pen y Gadair Fawr is to the north, Chwarel y Fan to the east and Pen Allt-mawr to the west.
