= Grwyne Fawr Reservoir =

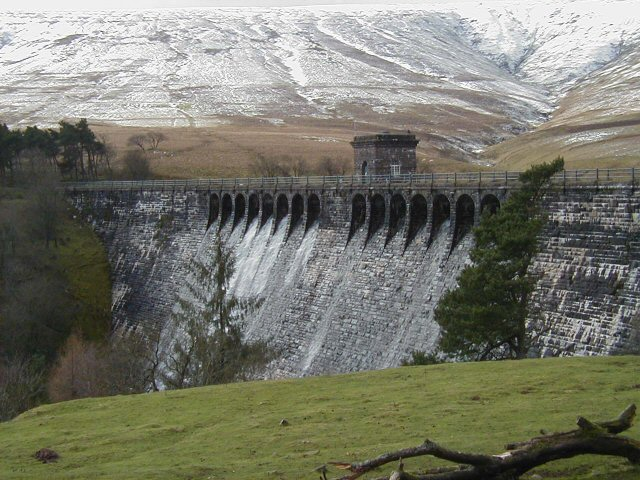

- Location within Brecon Beacons
- Location: Brecon Beacons, Wales
- Coordinates: 51°58′12″N 3°7′14″W
- Type: Reservoir
- Primary outflows: Grwyne Fawr
- Basin countries: United Kingdom
- Water volume: 400,000,000 imperial gallons (1,800 megalitres)
- Surface elevation: 1,725 feet (526 m)

The Grwyne Fawr Reservoir is located in the valley of the river Grwyne Fawr in the Brecon Beacons National Park, Wales. Completed in 1928, it has the capacity to hold 400,000,000 imperial gallons (1,800 megalitres).

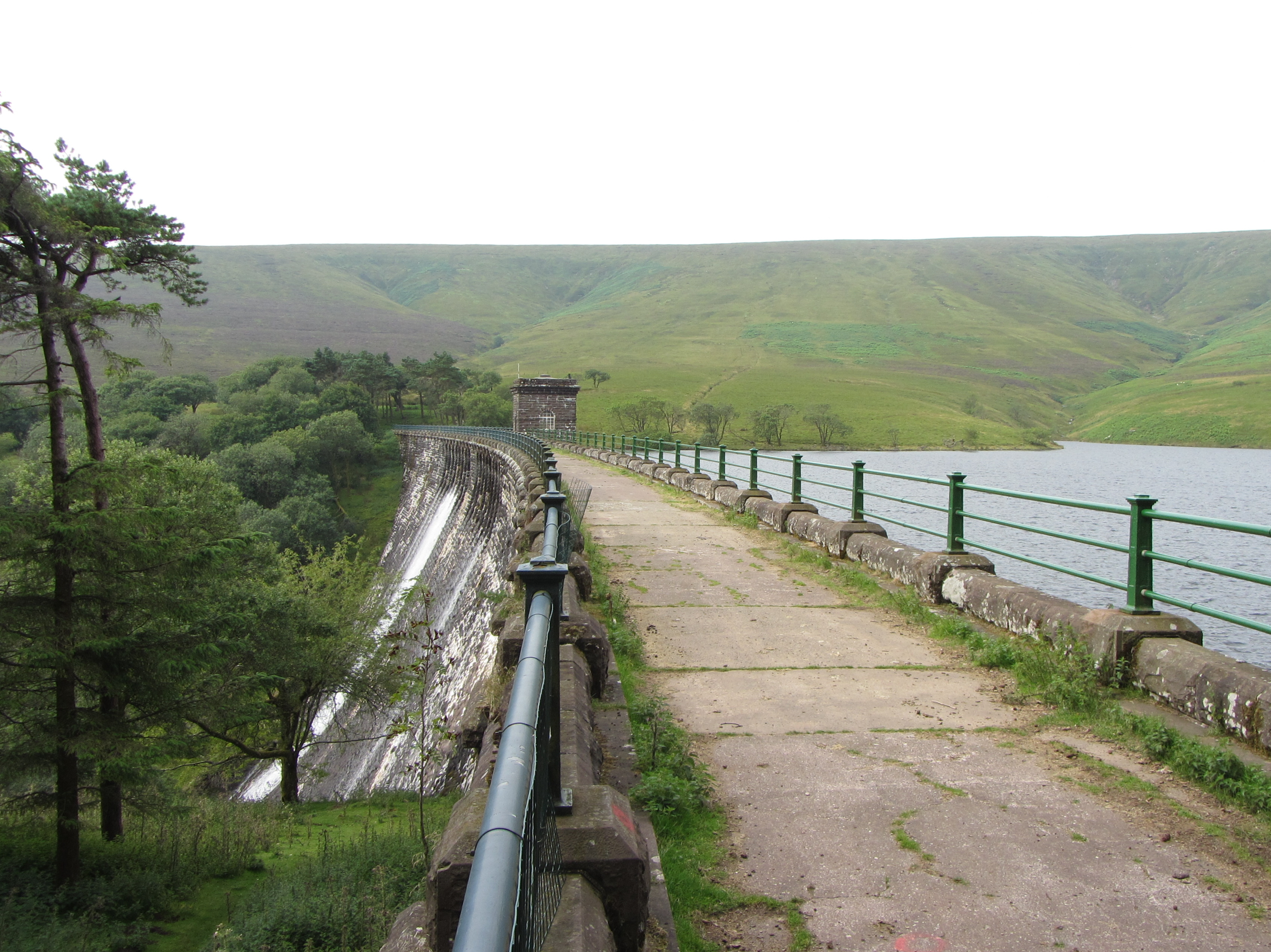
View across Grwyne Fawr dam

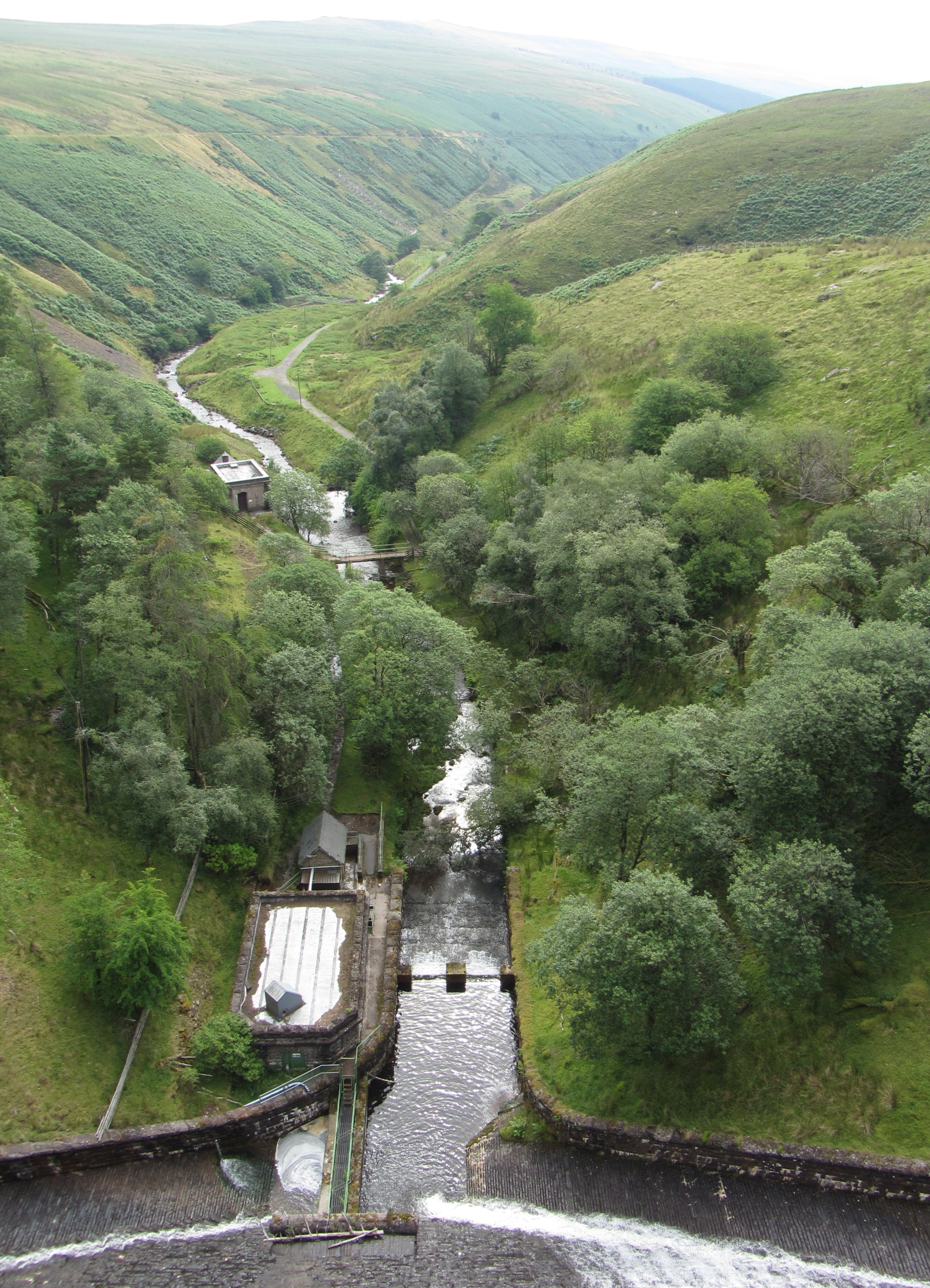
View down the Grwyne Fawr valley from the dam

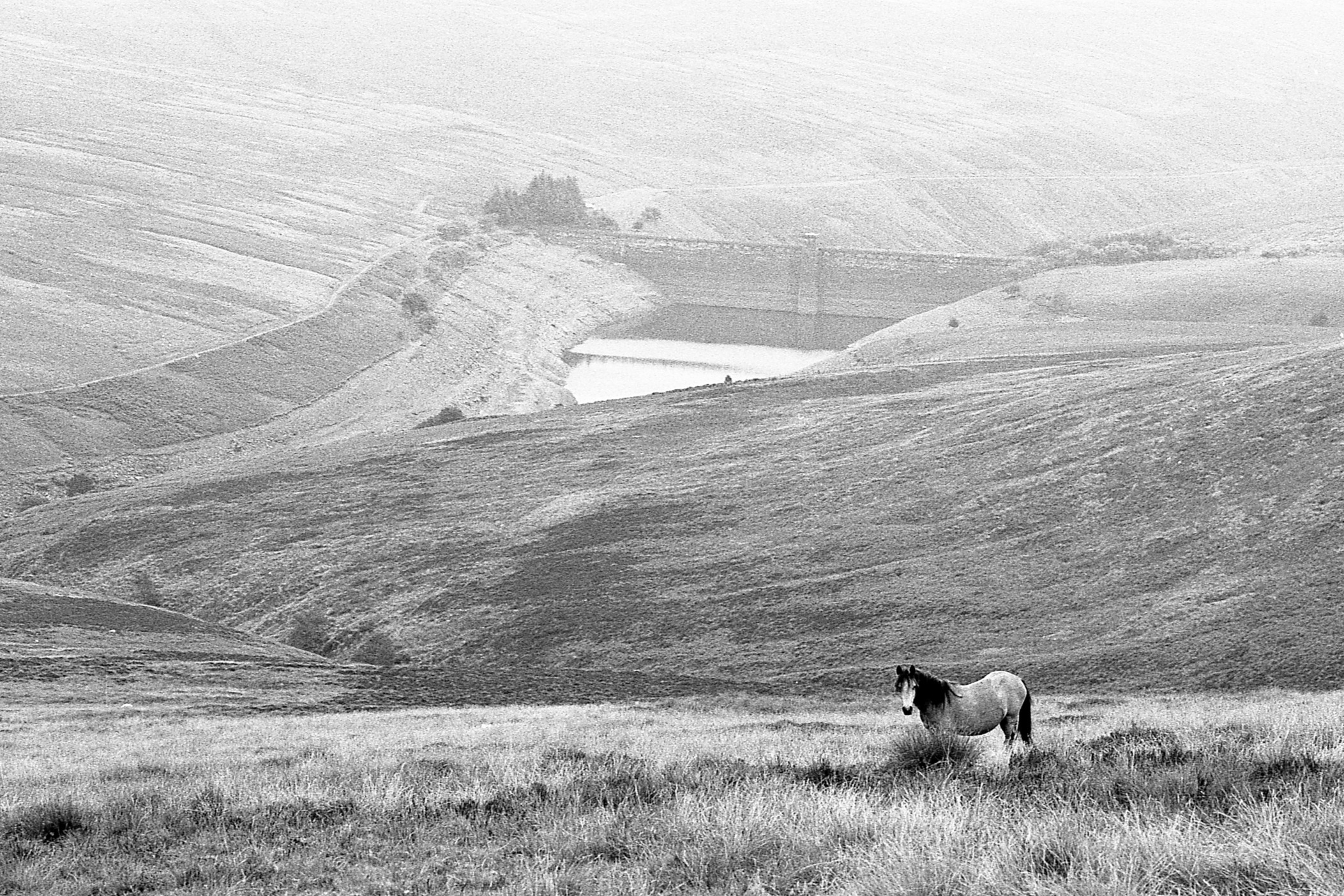
The Grwyne Fawr Reservoir during the 1976 drought

== Construction ==
By the end of the 19th-century there were serious water shortages in the western parts of the historic county of Monmouthshire. The area had seen a massive population increase as a result of the steel and coal industries but the supply of water to the area was complicated due to its high altitude. A site for a new reservoir was chosen at the head of the Grwyne Fawr valley because at 1725 ft above sea level it was high enough to allow water to be gravity fed to Abertillery and the surrounding areas.

Building works started in 1912, but almost immediately hit problems. The road constructed up the valley could not take the weight of the heavy traction engines used for haulage. It was decided that a new railway would be required, however negotiations with local land owners failed and the line remained incomplete. With the outbreak of the First World War proceedings were put on hold.

Work recommenced in January 1919; the railway was completed and connected to the main line at Llanvihangel Crucorney. A village of construction workers and their families grew in the valley at Blaen-y-cwm. A community of some 300 people lived there with a hostel, canteen, day school, police station and hospital. The workmen quarried 200,000 tons of sandstone for the construction of the dam. Large boulders weighing up to 5 tons each were set in concrete to form the dam, which is 130 feet thick at its base, the walls were then faced with dressed stone. A 16-inch diameter steel pipeline was tunnelled through Coity Mountain carrying water to a holding reservoir in Cwmtillery. The dam was finally completed in February 1928, after which the railway and structures that served its construction were quickly dismantled, including the workers’ village. The total cost of construction was reported to be £1 million.

== Operation ==
The reservoir has been decommissioned by Dŵr Cymru, the local water company, and no longer supplies drinking water. Poor management of the surrounding catchment area has allowed peat sediment to wash into the reservoir, causing water discolouration, and it has proved uneconomical to remedy the problem.
