= Sugar Loaf, Monmouthshire =

Hill in Monmouthshire, Wales

Coordinates: 51.86211°N 3.05859°W

Sugar Loaf
- Mynydd Pen-y-fâl
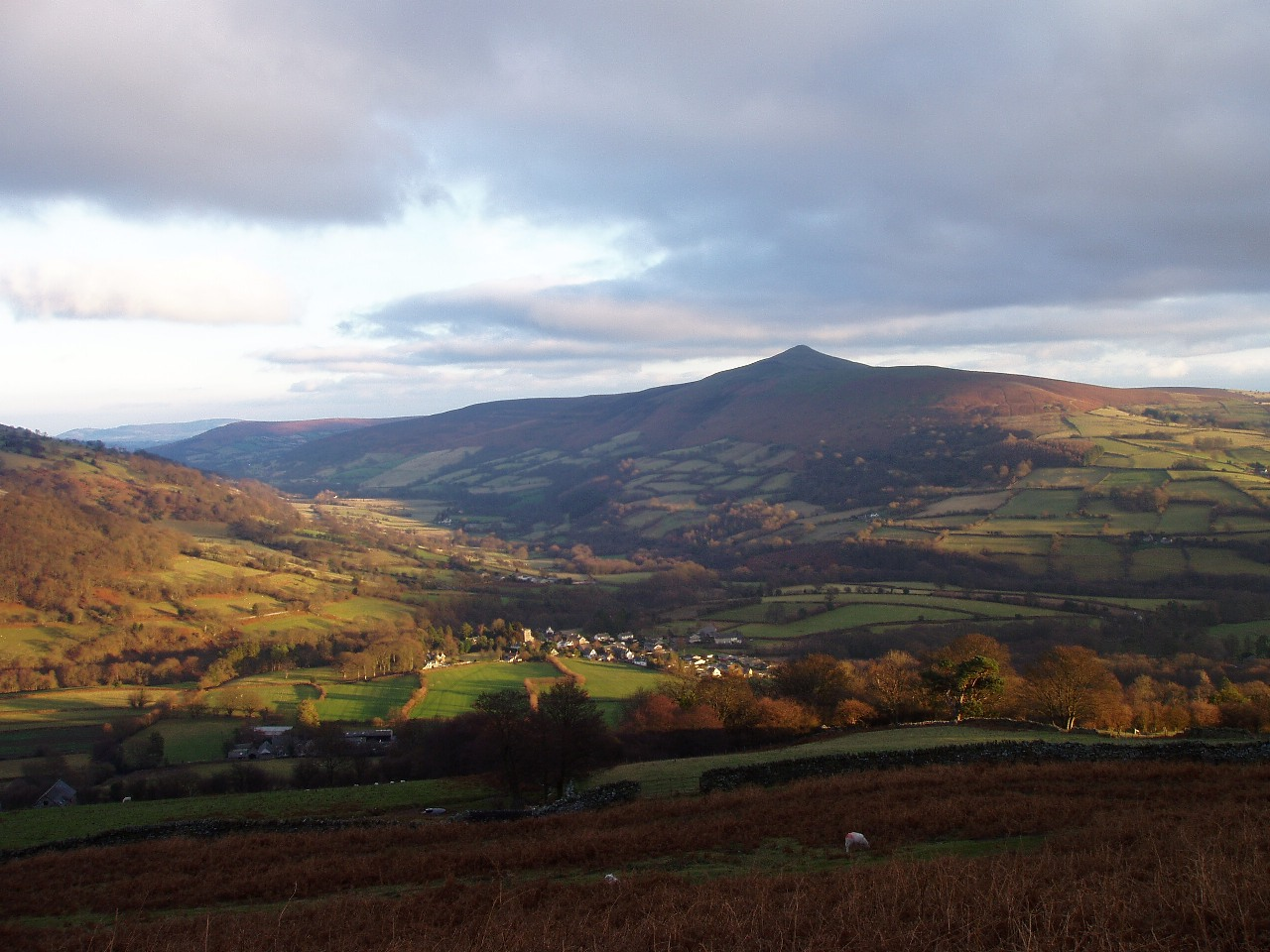
- The Sugar Loaf from the north-west, with the village of Llanbedr in the valley below

Highest point
- Elevation: 596 m (1,955 ft)
- Prominence: 411 m (1,348 ft)
- Parent peak: Waun Fach
- Listing: Marilyn

Geography
- Location: Monmouthshire, United Kingdom
- Parent range: Black Mountains
- OS grid: SO272187
- Topo map: OS Landranger 161

The Sugar Loaf (Welsh: Mynydd Pen-y-fâl) is a hill situated two miles (3.2 km) north-west of Abergavenny in Monmouthshire, Wales, within the Brecon Beacons National Park. It is the southernmost of the summit peaks of the Black Mountains, and rises to 1,955 feet (596 metres). The Sugar Loaf was gifted to the National Trust by suffragette Lady Rhondda.

== Name ==
The mountain was originally known as Y Fâl ("the peak"), while its distinctive summit was known as Pen y Fâl ("top of the peak"). The modern Welsh name is Mynydd Pen-y-fâl, meaning "mountain of the top of the peak". The name Sugar Loaf first appeared in the 18th century. The mountain shares this name with various others in Great Britain and elsewhere, all named for their resemblance to sugarloaves.

== Prehistory ==
A southern foothill of Sugar Loaf, Y Graig, was discovered in the 1990s to be the site of prehistoric flint tools dating from the Mesolithic, Neolithic and Bronze Ages.

== Geology ==
It is a popular misconception that Sugar Loaf is an "extinct volcano", an idea born perhaps from the striking resemblance of its conical outline, particularly when seen from the east, to that of a classic volcano. It is however composed entirely of sedimentary rocks. In common with the rest of the Black Mountains, the hill is formed from Old Red Sandstone which was laid down largely during the early part of the Devonian Period. Its lower slopes (up to around 1,000 feet (300 m)) are composed of mudstones and sandstones assigned to the Senni Formation whilst its upper reaches are composed of the more sandstone-rich sequence known as the Brownstones Formation. The very summit of Sugar Loaf is formed from sandstones of the Quartz Conglomerate Group which are of late Devonian age. There are a number of landslips on its flanks which are believed to date from early post-glacial times. The former Usk Valley glacier divided to north and south of it as it travelled eastwards, though the mountain itself is largely free from glacial till.

== Land use ==
The larger part of the mountain is in the ownership of the National Trust who manage its grazing by Welsh mountain sheep. The lower slopes are deciduous mixed woodland with fern, heather and bilberry, known locally as whinberry, on the upland slopes. The wooded slopes have been designated a Site of Special Scientific Interest.

A vineyard, producing Sugar Loaf wines, is situated at Dummar Farm at the foot of the mountain on south facing slopes near Abergavenny.

== Walking and view from the summit ==
The view from the summit covers the Black Mountains to the north, the Cotswolds to the east, as far as the Brecon Beacons including Pen y Fan and Corn Du to the west and the Bristol Channel to the south. The Skirrid is easily visible to the immediate east, including its spectacular landslip at its northern end. On a clear day it is possible to see hills as far north as Shropshire and as far south as Somerset.

The Sugar Loaf is popular with walkers and hillwalking enthusiasts and offers easy ascents on foot from the Sugar Loaf car park, at about 1,000 feet (300 m), or longer ascents from Abergavenny, Crickhowell or Llangenny.
