= John Martyn Roberts =

British inventor

Martyn John Roberts FRSE DL (1806–1878) was a 19th-century Welsh scientist and inventor who performed experiments with his unique galvanic battery for controlled explosion and contributed to innovations in conductors, photography theory, voltometry, electric light and much more.

== Life ==
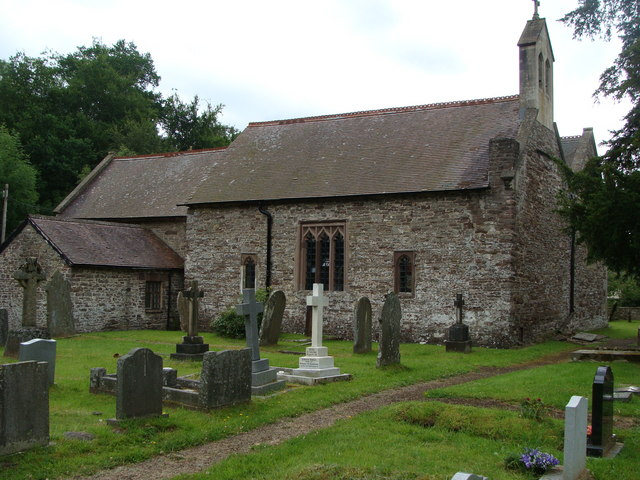
Llangenny churchyard

He was born in Wales on 2 August 1806 the son of Caroline Yalden of Lovington and her husband, John Roberts. He studied science at the University of Edinburgh.

In 1840 he was elected a Fellow of the Royal Society of Edinburgh. His proposer was Sir John Robison.

In 1864 he patented an invention to spin wool. He also in the same year patented a device to reduce friction on ships propellers but this lapsed in 1867 due to non-payment of the £50 stamp duty.

He died on 8 September 1878. He is buried in Llangenny Churchyard along with his son.

== Family ==
In 1840 he married Anne Eliza Gordon daughter of William Gordon, brother of Sir John Gordon. They lived at Pendarren House near Crickhowell in Wales.

Their eldest son was William Scarlett Roberts (b.1849).
