= Chwarel y Fan =

Mountain peak in Monmouthshire, Wales

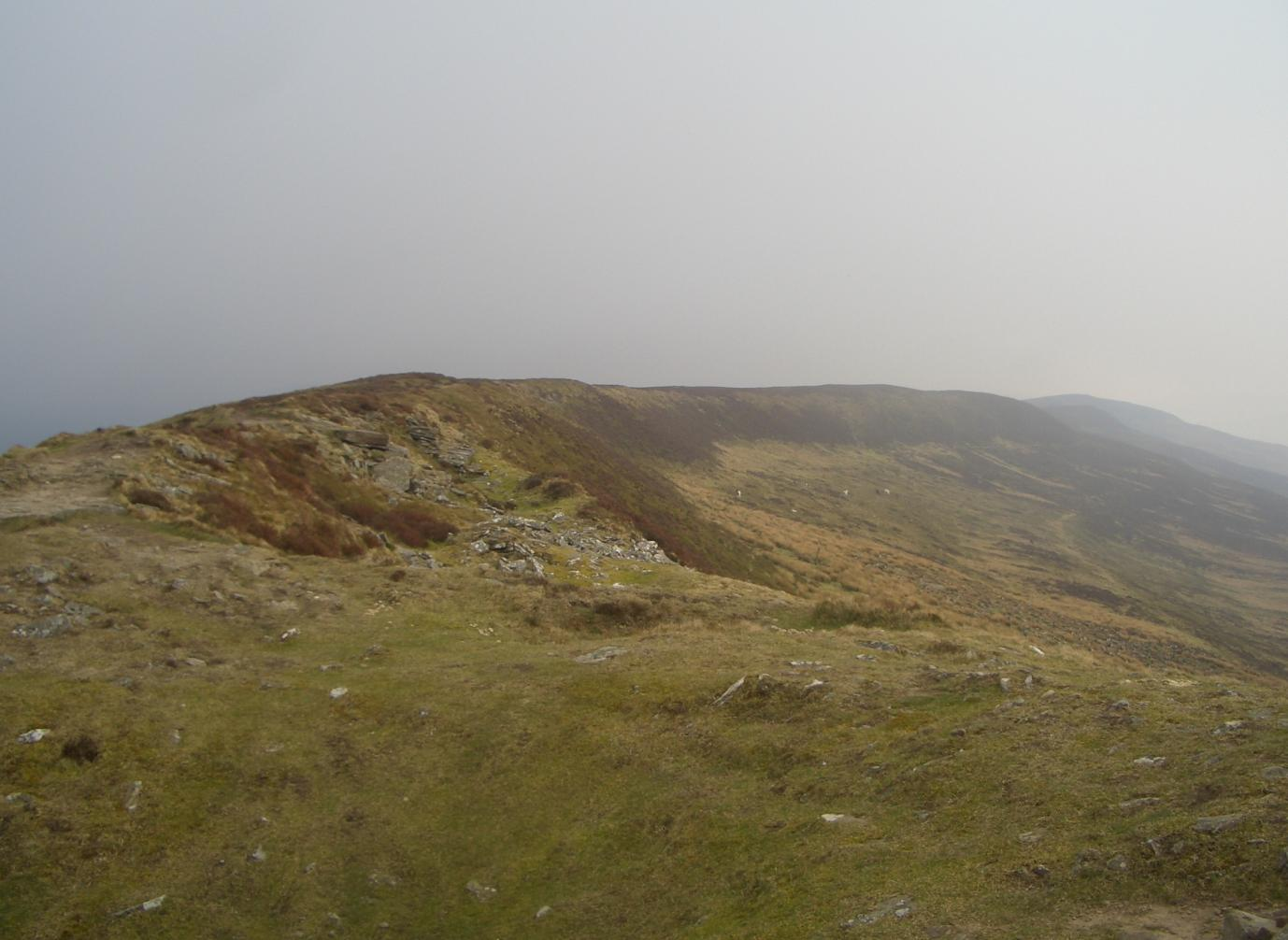
- The Chwarel y Fan summit ridge

Highest point
- Elevation: 679 m (2,228 ft)
- Prominence: 72 m (236 ft)
- Parent peak: Waun Fach
- Listing: Hewitt, Nuttall, County top
- Coordinates: 51°57′30″N 3°04′51″W

Naming
- English translation: quarry of the beacon
- Language of name: Welsh

Geography
- Location within Monmouthshire
- Location: Black Mountains, South Wales
- OS grid: SO258294
- Topo map: OS Landranger 161

Chwarel y Fan is a peak in the Black Mountains in south-eastern Wales. It is the highest rise on the long ridge which extends southeastwards from Rhos Dirion. The ridge continues southeastwards to the lesser summit of Bal-Mawr whose top is adorned by a trig point at 607 metres (1,991 ft) above sea level. About one km (0.62 mi) southeast along the ridge is the lesser top of Bal-Bach at a height of just over 520 metres (1,710 ft). Chwarel y Fan is the county top of the historic county of Monmouthshire, and is also the highest point in the current local government area of Monmouthshire.

The summit is on a thin ridge and is crowned by a cairn. On the other sides of the valleys: to the west is Pen Twyn Mawr and to the east is Black Mountain.
