= Crug Hywel =

Summit hillfort in south Wales

Coordinates: 51.87946°N 3.12727°W

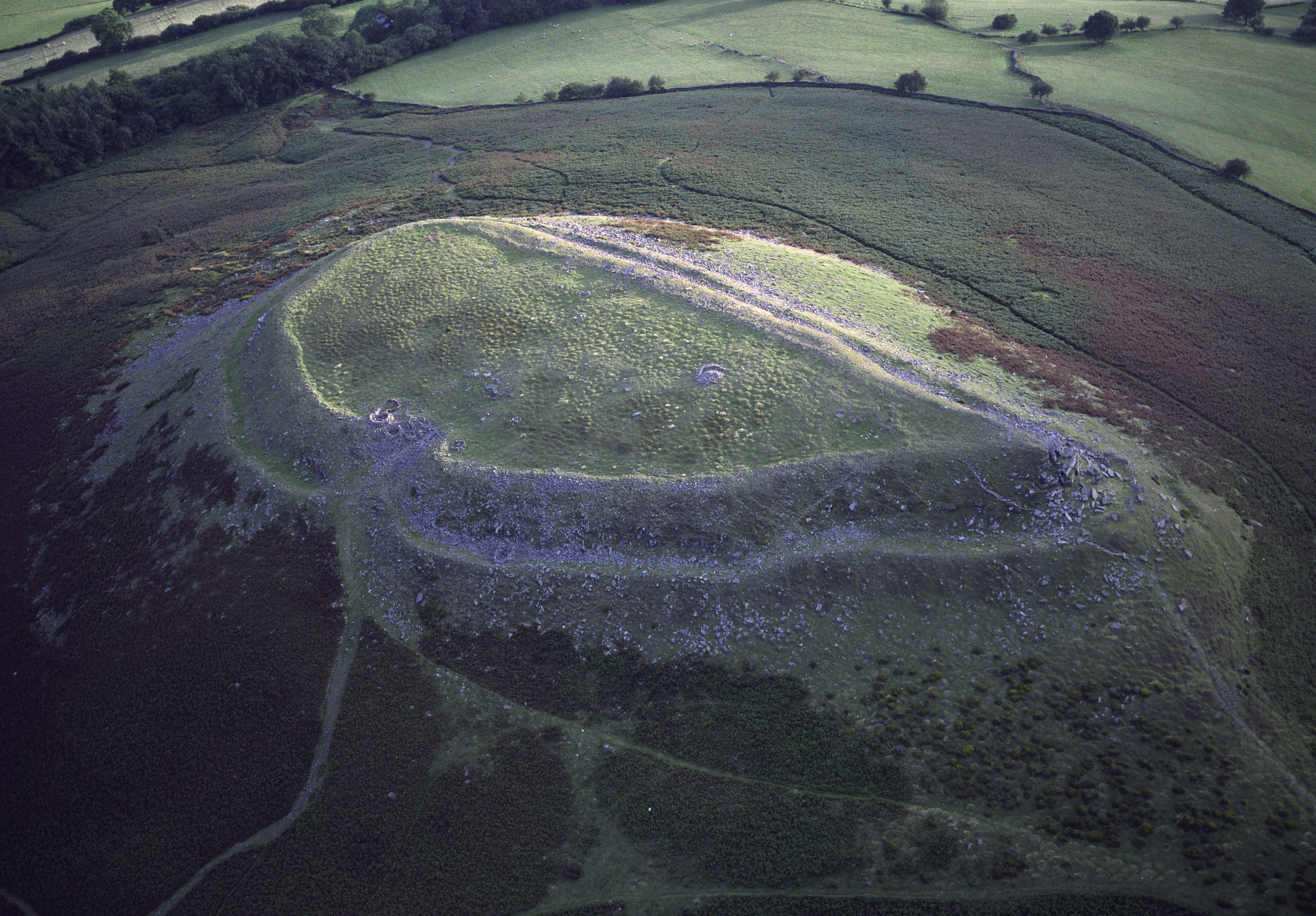
- Crug Hywel, Black Mountains

Highest point
- Elevation: 451 m (1,480 ft)
- Prominence: < 10 m

Naming
- English translation: Hywel's mound
- Language of name: Welsh
- Pronunciation: Welsh: [ˈkriːɡ ˈhəwɛl]

Geography
- Location: Black Mountains, Wales
- OS grid: SO225207

Crug Hywel is an Iron Age Celtic hillfort, with a clearly visible earth and stone ditch and rampart. Crug Hywel is approached by a couple of public footpaths across farmland from Crickhowell and Llanbedr and visited by the Beacons Way. It lies within an area designated as open country over which the public have the right to roam.

The name is sometimes given to the flat-topped hill itself, which is also called Table Mountain in English. Located at the southern edge of the Black Mountains in south-east Wales, it rises to 451 m above sea level, from the southern flank of Pen Cerrig-calch (701 m), and overlooks the town of Crickhowell, whose name derives from Crug Hywel.

The Welsh name Mynydd y Begwn is also used for this summit. As a result, it has been suggested that the name Crug Hywel (which means 'Hywel's mound') may originally have referred to the castle mound in Crickhowell.

== Geology ==
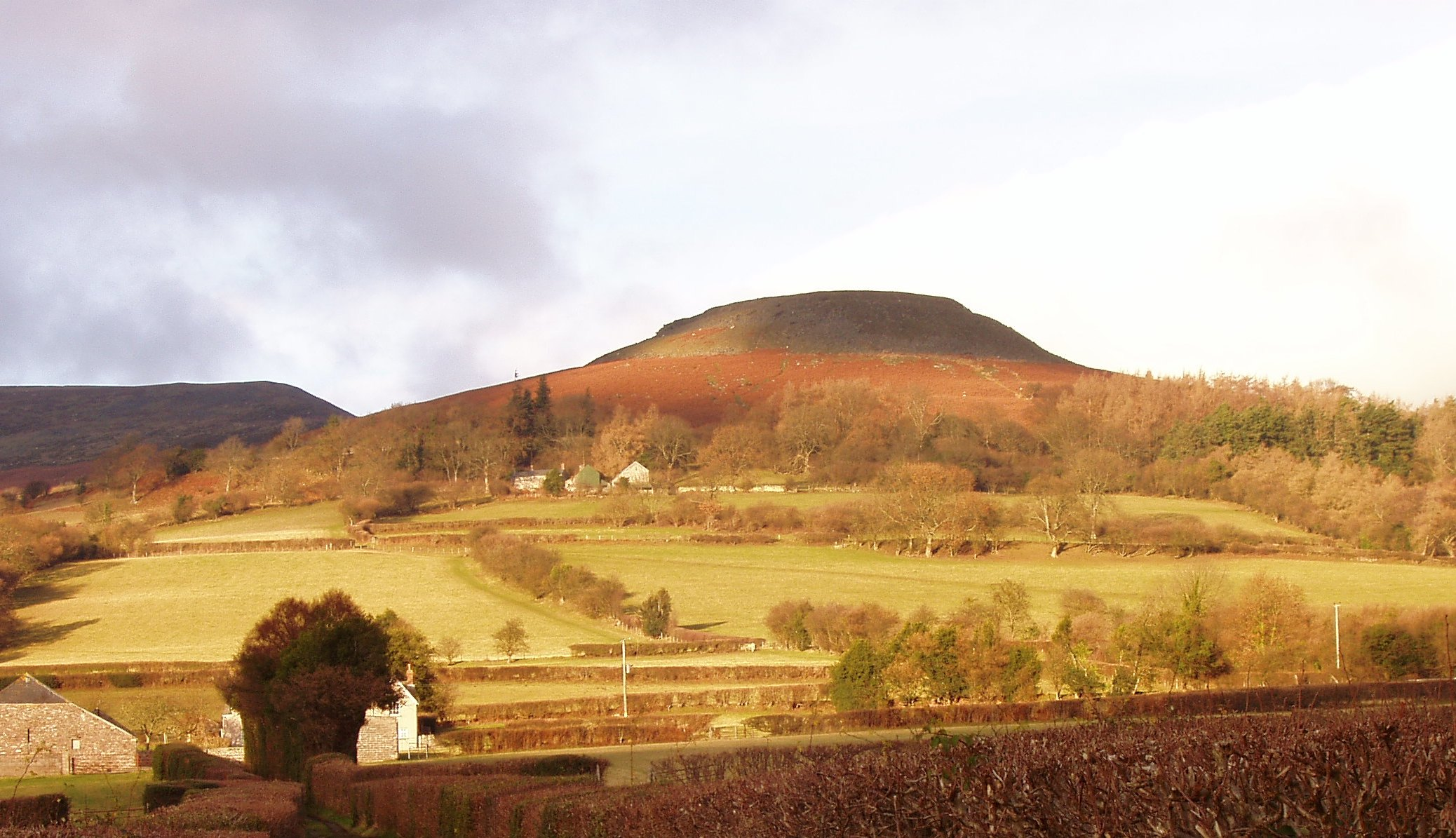
Crug Hywel

The hill is formed from Old Red Sandstone originating in the Devonian period, specifically the sandstones of the Brownstones Formation, topped by rocks of the Quartz Conglomerate Group. The whole mass of rocks forming this outlier of Pen Cerrig-calch can readily be seen to dip more sharply to the south than nearby strata and is considered to be an excellent example of a translational slide.

== See also ==
- List of hillforts in Wales
