= Grwyne Fawr =

River in south Wales

Coordinates: 51°50′N 3°06′W

The Grwyne Fawr is a river in the Brecon Beacons National Park in south Wales. A section of it forms the administrative border between Powys and Monmouthshire and also of the historic counties of Brecon and Monmouth. The river and its major tributary the Grwyne Fechan flow into the River Usk at Glangrwyney.

The name probably originates from gweryn or gwerynau and mawr/fawr meaning 'large river at the wet place'.

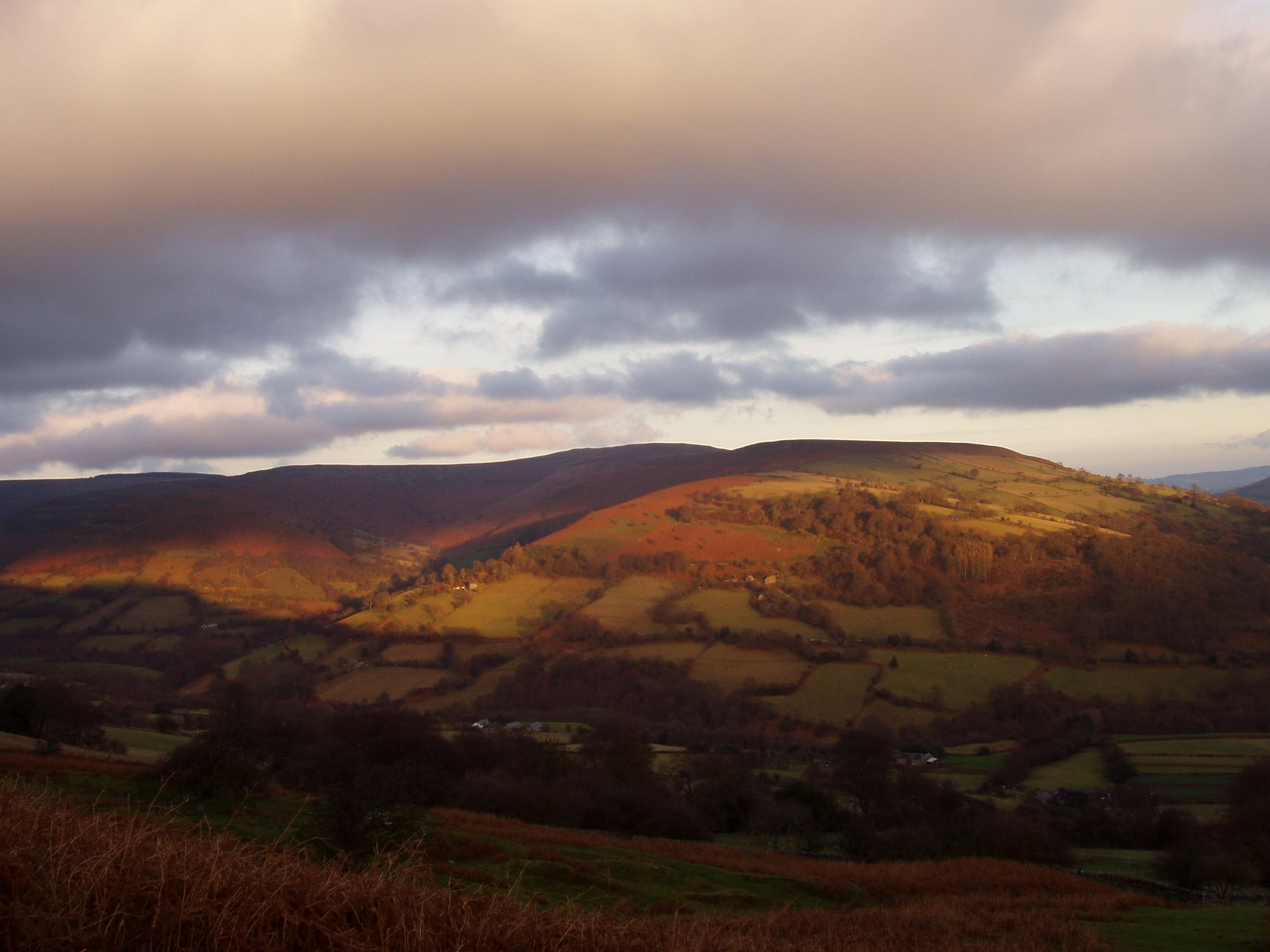
The southern part of the Grwyne Fechan valley in the Black Mountains

The Gwryne Fawr rises at Blaen Grwyne Fawr on the southern slopes of Rhos Dirion in the Black Mountains and follows a southeastward course for several miles, its flow interrupted by the presence of Grwyne Fawr Reservoir, the only waterbody within this range of hills. Some way below the reservoir, Mynydd Du Forest clothes the sides of the valley. Though a public road penetrates the valley as far as the north end of the forest, the valley is very sparsely populated. It is only approaching the hamlet of Partrishow that the valley takes on a farmed appearance. The river now heads west along a valley whose alignment is guided by the presence of a geological line of weakness known as the Neath Disturbance.

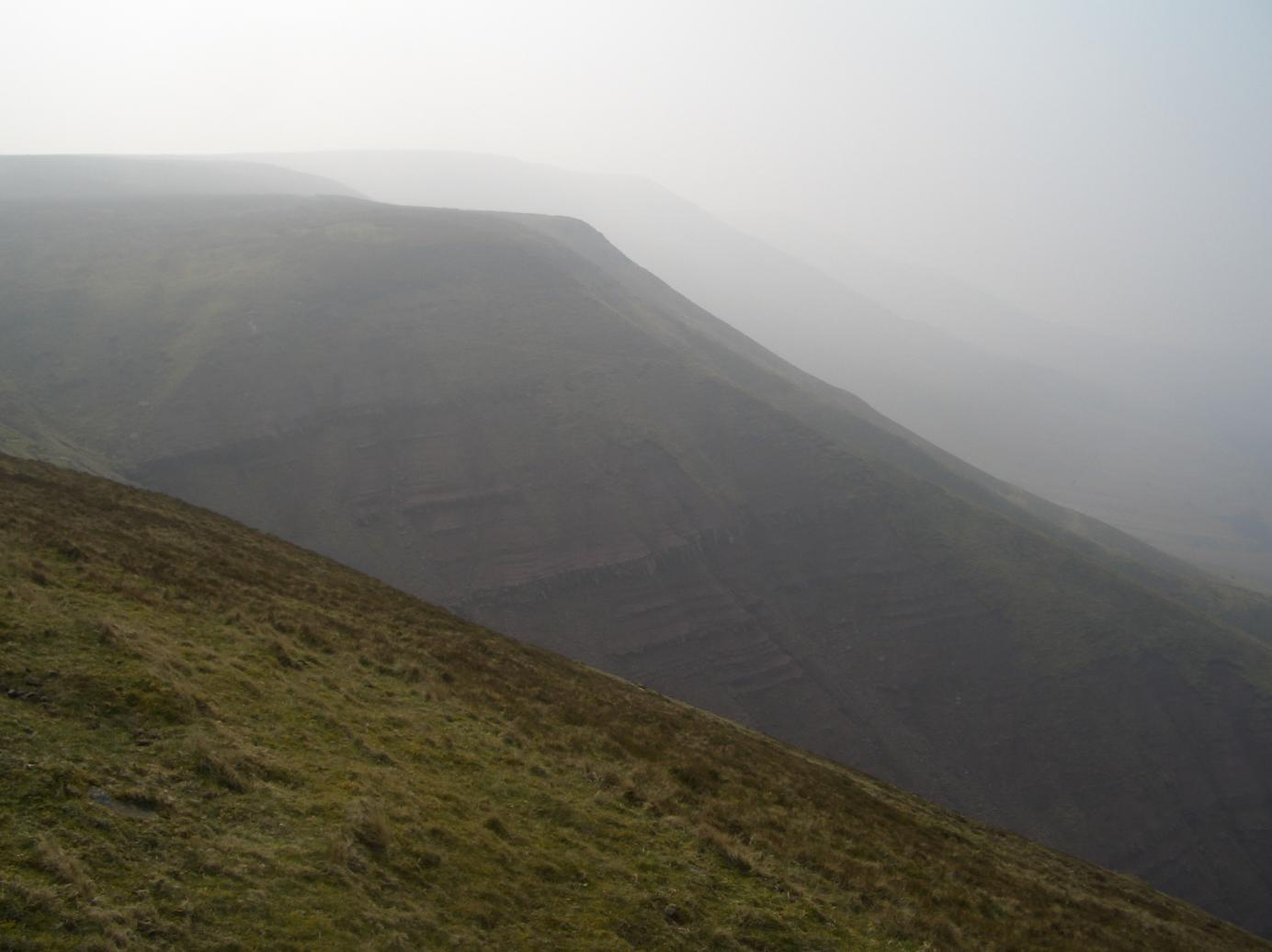
Rhos Dirion in the Black Mountains

To the west, the Grwyne Fechan takes a parallel course to that of its larger neighbour. It rises on the southern slopes of Waun Fach and gathers a number of tributary streams from the broad ridge which separates it from the Grwyne Fawr. Though there are numerous conifer plantations, the valley has a more open aspect than that of the Grwyne Fawr.

The two rivers join near the village of Llanbedr and head south as the Grwyne Fawr through the hamlet of Llangenny to their confluence with the River Usk at Glangrwyney.

== Geology ==
Both the Grwyne Fawr and the Grwyne Fechan drain the Old Red Sandstone hills of the Black Mountains. These are the Brownstones and Senni Formations which date from the Breconian stage of the Devonian period. The sandstones and mudstones of these formations can frequently be seen in the beds of the two rivers and sometimes exposed in the often steep valley sides. The lower reaches of the river run through an area blanketed with glacial till, a legacy of the last ice age.

== History ==
The valley of the Grwyne Fawr, then known as "Coed Grano", was the site of the murder in 1136 of the Norman Marcher lord Richard de Clare, 1st Earl of Hereford, by the Welsh under Iorwerth ab Owain and his brother Morgan, grandsons of Caradog ap Gruffydd. This resulted in a period of conflict between the Welsh and English in south Wales.

The Grwyne Fawr Reservoir was built primarily between 1919 and 1928, although an earlier start had been made in 1912.
