= Pen Cerrig-calch =

Mountain (701m) in Powys, Wales

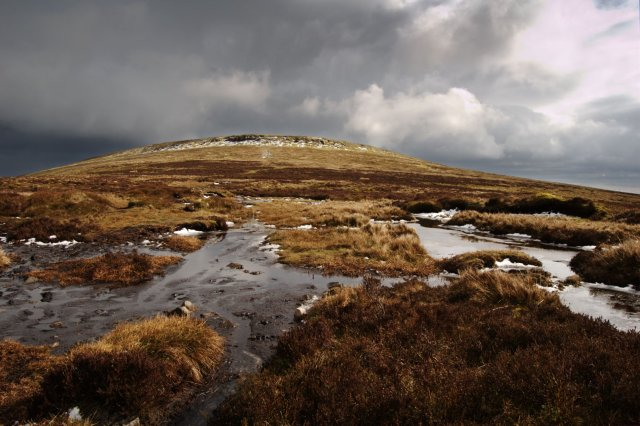
- Pen Cerrig-calch from the col leading to Pen Allt-mawr

Highest point
- Elevation: 701 m (2,300 ft)
- Prominence: 52 m (171 ft)
- Parent peak: Waun Fach
- Listing: Hewitt, Nuttall
- Coordinates: 51.8939°N 3.1369°W

Naming
- English translation: top of the limestones
- Language of name: Welsh

Geography
- Location: Black Mountains, Wales
- OS grid: SO217223
- Topo map: OS Landranger 161

Pen Cerrig-calch is a subsidiary summit of Waun Fach in the Black Mountains in the Brecon Beacons National Park in southern Powys, Wales. Its summit, at a height of 701 m (2,300 ft), is marked by a trig point. The peak sits high above the River Usk valley as it narrows above the small town of Crickhowell. The views from here are wide-ranging and extend as far as the Beacons themselves to the west. A ridge runs off to the northwest and the shoulder of Pen Gloch-y-pibwr then turns north to the secondary top of Pen Allt-mawr whose peak at 719m is also crowned by a trig point.

== Geology ==
Like all of the hills in the Black Mountains, Pen Cerrig-calch is formed from mudstones and sandstones of the Old Red Sandstone laid down during the Devonian period but it is unusual in having a band of Carboniferous Limestone outcropping around the summit and giving rise to a few shakeholes. A classic example of an outlier, the name of the hill reflects this situation; it means 'top of the limestone rock' in Welsh. The actual summit itself is formed from pebbly sandstone of the Marros Group (formerly the Millstone Grit Series), which also dates from the Carboniferous period.
The rounded southwestern shoulder of the hill ends abruptly at a cliff by the name of Darren (Welsh 'edge') which was formed by a sizeable landslip which most probably occurred in the early post-glacial period. There are many similar landslips in the Black Mountains, where weak strata have been eroded away, and destabilized the strata above. A large area of hummocky ground abounding with boulders of Old Red Sandstone lies across the slopes below Darren.

== Archaeology ==
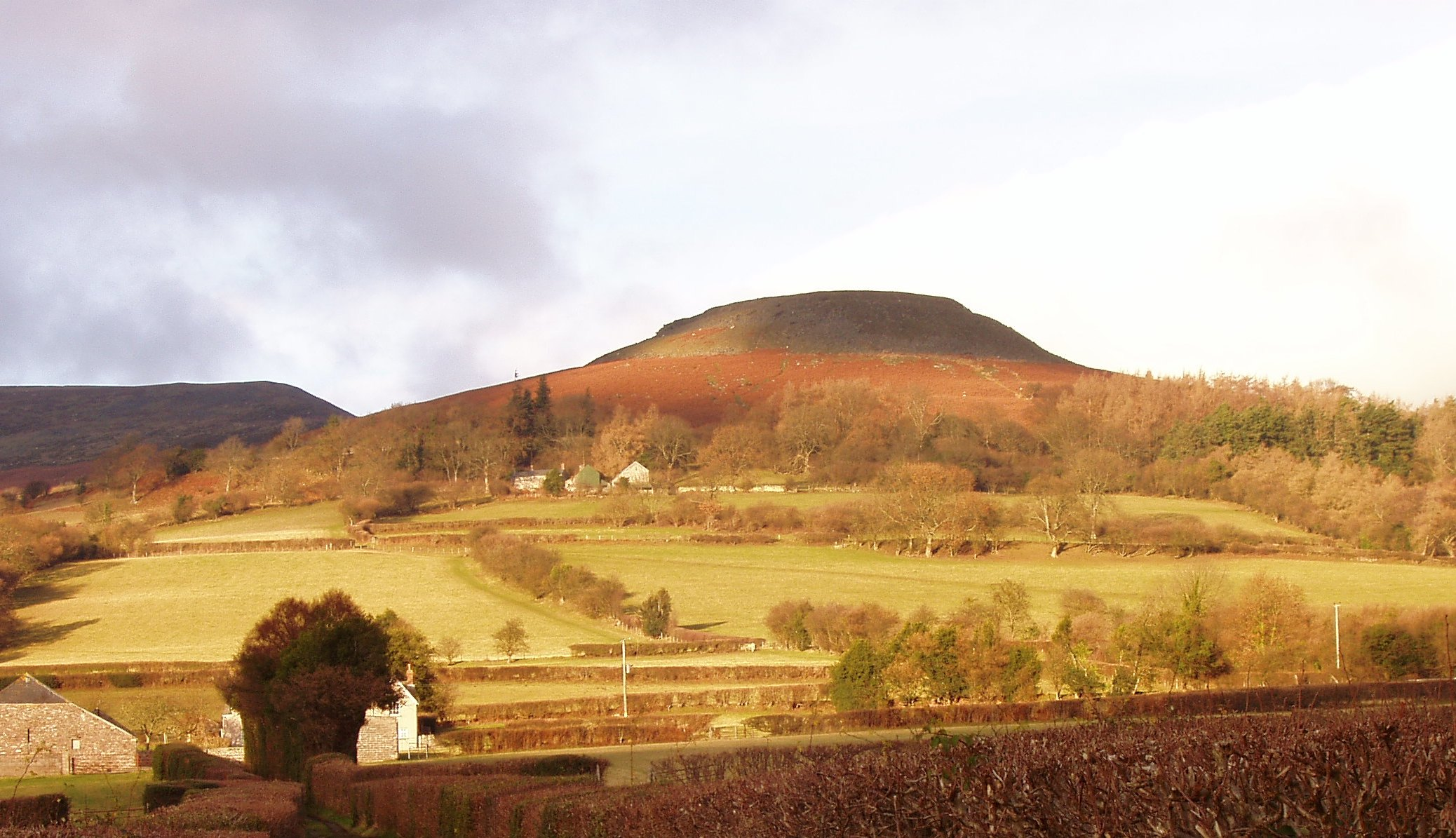
Crug Hywel seen from a distance

The most celebrated feature of the hill is the fortification of Crug Hywel, a presumed Iron Age hillfort sitting atop a tilted mass of gritstone on the hill's southeastern spur and otherwise known as Table Mountain. However, there are also ancient cairns on each of the main tops. Small disused quarries once worked for the Old Red Sandstone are scattered across the hill's lower slopes.

== Access ==
The upper parts of the hill are mapped as access land. Various footpaths approach the open access land from the Usk Valley and from the valley of the Grwyne Fechan to the east. The Beacons Way skirts the hill's southern and western slopes. The most popular route to the summit is the approach up the southeastern spur from Crug Hywel (Table Mountain).
