= Allt Lwyd =

Hill (653.1m) in Powys, Wales

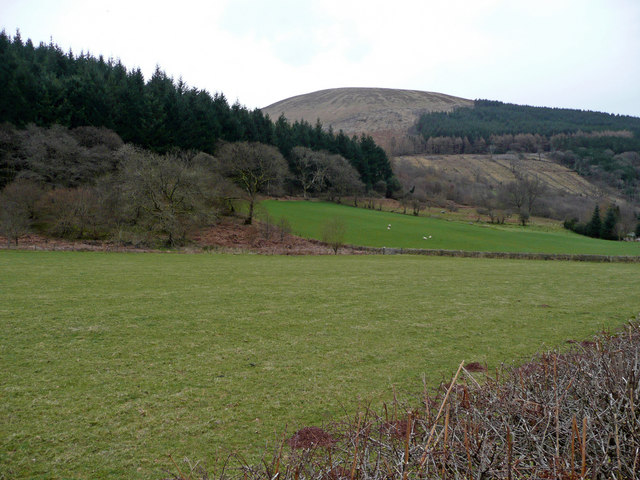
- Allt Lwyd viewed from the south

Highest point
- Elevation: 653 m (2,142 ft)
- Prominence: 28 m (92 ft)
- Parent peak: Waun Rydd
- Listing: sub Hewitt, Nuttall
- Coordinates: 51.8611°N 3.3390°W

Naming
- English translation: grey slope
- Language of name: Welsh

Geography
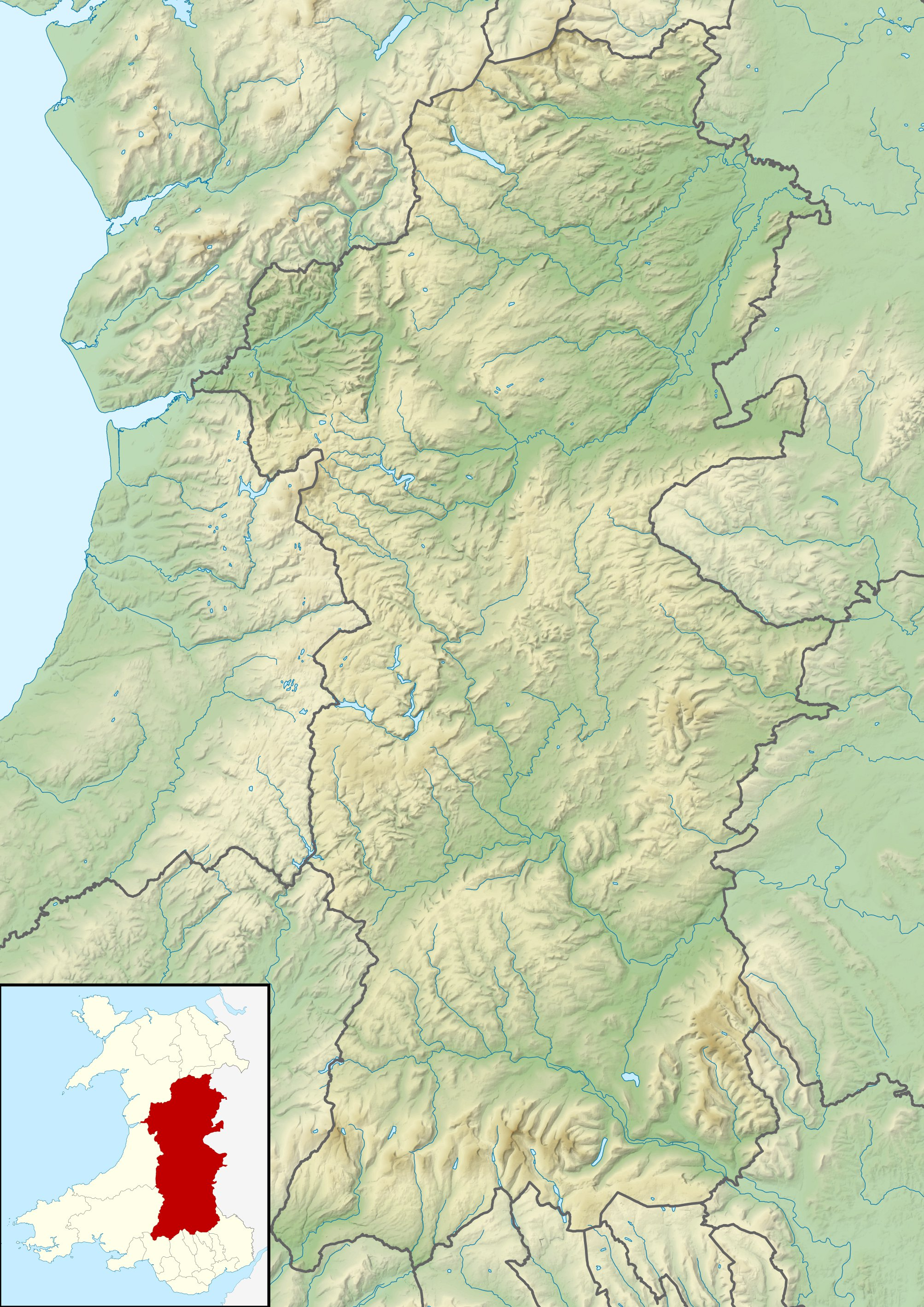
- Location within Powys
- Location: Powys, Wales
- Parent range: Brecon Beacons
- OS grid: SO012215
- Topo map: OS Landranger 160

Allt Lwyd is a top of Waun Rydd in the Brecon Beacons National Park, in southern Powys, Wales.

The summit is heathery and marked by a small pile of stones. It is found at the end of Waun Rydd's south-east ridge. It overlooks Talybont Reservoir, and has the Talybont Forest on its steep flanks.
