= Waun Rydd =

Mountain (769.2m) in Powys, Wales

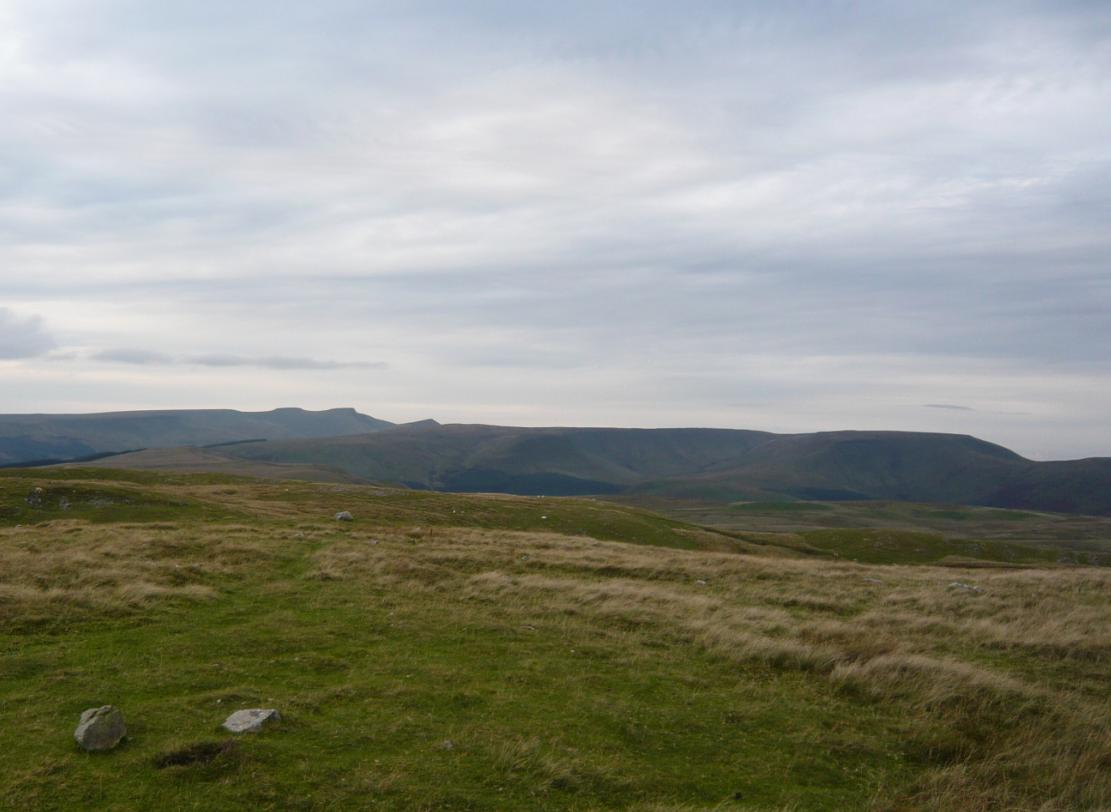
- Left to right: Pen y Fan and Corn Du, Gwaun Cerrig Llwydion, Waun Rydd and Allt Lwyd from Cefn yr Ystrad

Highest point
- Elevation: 769 m (2,523 ft)
- Prominence: 170 m (560 ft)
- Parent peak: Pen y Fan
- Listing: Marilyn, Hewitt, Nuttall
- Coordinates: 51.8766°N 3.3641°W

Naming
- English translation: free/open moor
- Language of name: Welsh

Geography
- Location: Powys, Wales
- Parent range: Brecon Beacons
- OS grid: SO012215
- Topo map: OS Landranger 160

Listed summits of Waun Rydd
Name	Grid ref	Height	Status
Gwaun Cerrig Llwydion	SJ066318	754 metres (2,474 ft)	Nuttall
Fan y Big	SJ066318	719 metres (2,359 ft)	Hewitt, Nuttall
Allt Lwyd	SJ066318	654 metres (2,146 ft)	sub Hewitt, Nuttall

Waun Rydd is a mountain in the Brecon Beacons National Park, in southern Powys, Wales. Its height is 769 m (2,523 ft) and it tops a large boggy plateau rising to the east of Pen y Fan.

The hill takes the form of a plateau with sharp rims on several sides. To the northeast is Craig Pwllfa overlooking Cwm Banw whilst Craig y Fan looks east over Cwm Tarthwynni. To the south is the edge known as Cwar y Gigfran which translates into English as 'quarry of the crow'. It marks the top of a large landslip area extending to the stream of Blaen y Glyn below.

Several ridges extend north and east from the plateau. That known as Gist Wen runs north-northeast to the subsidiary top of Bryn (561m above sea level). The short ridges of Cefn Bach and Cefn Edmwnt run northeast whilst that of Twyn Du extends eastwards towards Talybont Reservoir. A further ridge runs southeast to the subsidiary top of Allt Lwyd (654m). To the south a broad ridge runs to a col beyond which is the top of Allt Forgan (513m).
