= Llangenny =

Hamlet in Powys, Wales

Coordinates: 51.85634°N 3.10499°W

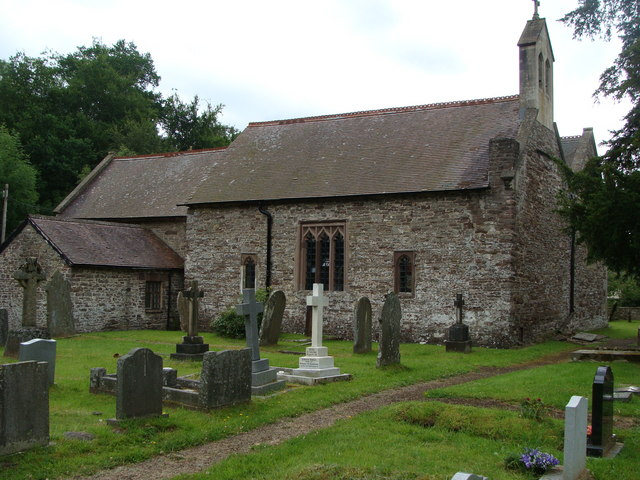
St Cenau's church

Llangenny (Welsh: Llangenau) is a village in the Brecon Beacons National Park, Powys, Wales. It is in the lower reaches of the Grwyne Fawr. The Vale of Grwyney community consists of Glangrwyney, Llanbedr, and Llangenny.

Notable features in Llangenny include the Grade II* listed St. Cenau's parish church, the Dragons Head Inn and Cwm Barn, an old barn converted into accommodation. The population is approximately 100.

The area is popular with hill-walkers and for camping and outdoor activities.

== Notable people ==
- John Martyn Roberts FRSE (1806–1878) inventor with his unique galvanic battery, buried in Llangenny Churchyard
- Richard William Davies (19th C.) a Welsh Anglican priest and archdeacon of Brecon from 1859 to 1875.
