= Pen y Gadair Fawr =

Mountain (800m) in Powys, Wales

Coordinates: 51.96292°N 3.14392°W

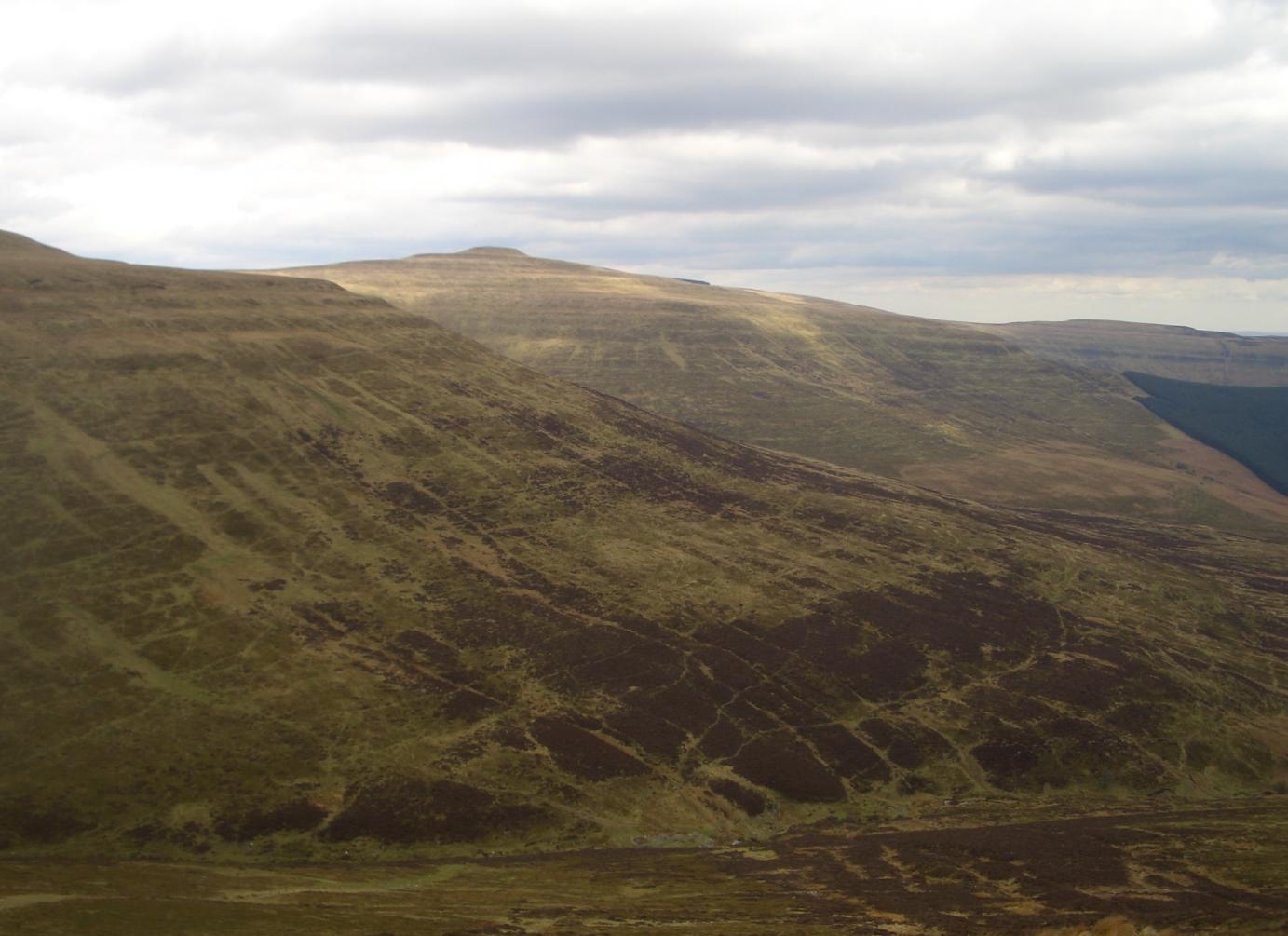
- Pen y Gadair Fawr with Waun Fach (left)

Highest point
- Elevation: 800 m (2,600 ft)
- Prominence: 47 m (154 ft)
- Parent peak: Waun Fach
- Listing: Hewitt, Nuttall

Naming
- English translation: top of the large chair
- Language of name: Welsh

Geography
- Location: Black Mountains, South Wales
- OS grid: SO215300
- Topo map: OS Landranger 161

Listed summits of Pen y Gadair Fawr
Name	Grid ref	Height	Status
Pen Twyn Mawr	SN969193	658 metres (2,159 ft)	Nuttall

Pen y Gadair Fawr is an 800 metres (2,625 ft) high subsidiary summit of Waun Fach and the second highest peak in the Black Mountains in south-eastern Wales. Marked by a medium-sized cairn, it is a much more distinguished top than its parent 1.5 km to the northwest. Its 658 metres (2,159 ft) high top Pen Twyn Mawr is about 2 km to the southeast.

== Geology ==
The summit and upper slopes of Pen y Gadair Fawr are formed from the Early Devonian Epoch sandstones of the Brownstones Formation, a division of the Old Red Sandstone. Beneath these and forming the lower slopes are the sandstones of the Senni Formation (traditionally the Senni Beds). Mudstone layers within these sandstones are more readily eroded and have given rise to the stepped appearance of parts of the mountain, not least the summit section. Peat has accumulated on parts of the hill in the postglacial period, notably north towards Waun Fach.

== Access ==
The hill is wholly within land mapped under the Countryside and Rights of Way Act 2000 as open country and hence is legally accessible to walkers despite their being no public rights of way leading to it. Mountain bikers can follow the forest roads within nearby Mynydd Du Forest, one of which tops out at 715m, just 0.5 km from the summit, but have no legal access to the hill itself.
