= Twmpa =

Mountain in southeast Wales

Coordinates: 52°00′29″N 3°07′48″W

Twmpa/Lord Hereford's Knob
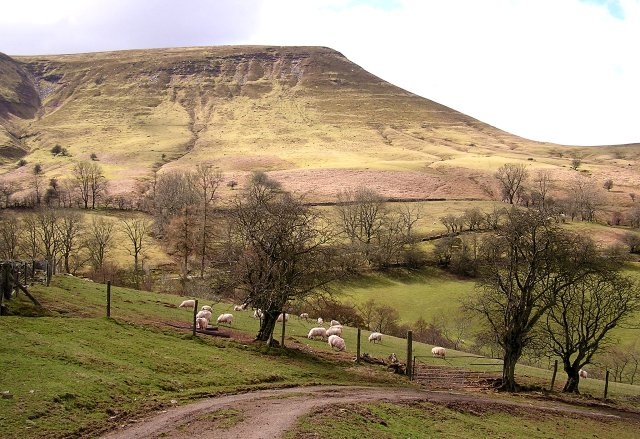

Highest point
- Elevation: 690 m (2,260 ft)
- Prominence: 79 m (259 ft)
- Parent peak: Waun Fach
- Listing: Hewitt, Nuttall

Geography
- Location: Powys, Wales
- Parent range: Black Mountains
- OS grid: SO224350
- Topo map: OS Landranger 161

Twmpa or Lord Hereford's Knob is a mountain in south-east Wales, forming a part of the great northwest scarp of the Black Mountains. It lies 1.86 miles (3 km) west of the border with England, and around 4.34 miles (7 km) south of Hay-on-Wye. To the northeast lies the Gospel Pass through which runs a minor road between Hay and the Llanthony Valley. A ridge known as Darren Lwyd tapers away for about 3 kilometres (1.9 mi) to the southeast of the summit.

== Geology ==
In common with neighbouring hills, Twmpa is composed of alternate layers of sandstone and mudstone dating from the Devonian period and ascribed to the Lower Old Red Sandstone. Its lower slopes are formed from the mudstone-dominated St Maughans Formation whilst the upper part of the hill is composed of sandstone-dominated Senni Formation rocks. At the junction between the two is a prominent calcrete known as the Ffynnon Limestone.

Numerous landslips have occurred within the St Maughans Formation around the flanks of the hill.

== Access ==
The entire hill is classed as open country under the CRoW Act and is therefore available for walkers to roam freely across. It is almost encircled by public bridleways and restricted byways. The most well-used track is that running west from Gospel Pass (where car parking is available), over its summit and then southwest towards Rhos Dirion. A further track runs the length of the ridge southeastwards to the hamlet of Capel-y-ffin.

== In popular culture ==
Lord Hereford's Knob was the subject of a satirical folk rock song of the same name by post-punk band Half Man Half Biscuit. It features on their 2008 album CSI:Ambleside. The mountain also appears in the poem 'Wales Visitation' by Allen Ginsberg, written under the influence of LSD during a visit to the cottage of his publisher Tom Maschler in the summer of 1967.
