= Rhos Dirion =

Hill (713.4m) in Powys, Wales

Coordinates: 51.96292°N 3.14392°W

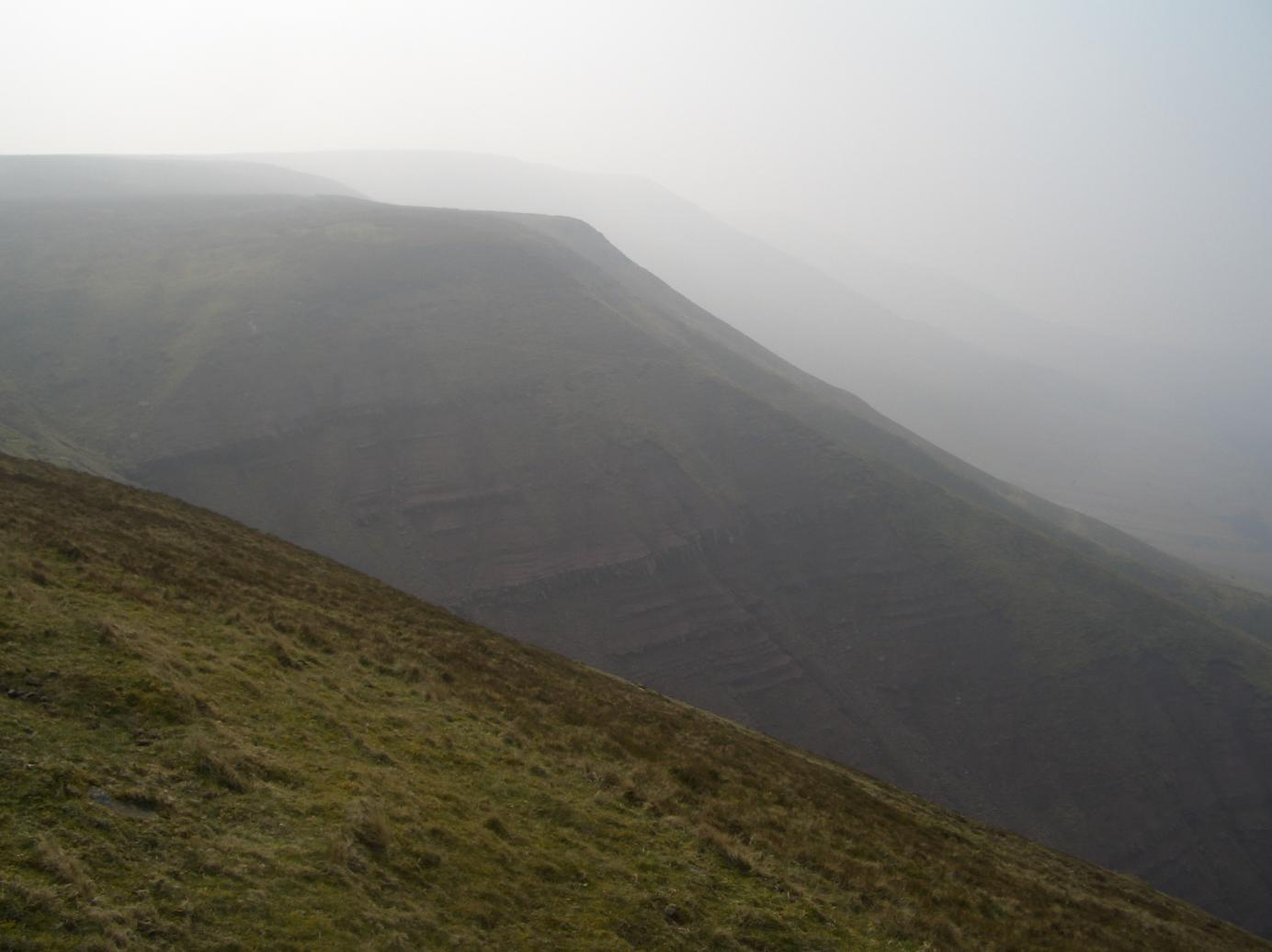
- The north face of Rhos Dirion from Twmpa

Highest point
- Elevation: 713 m (2,339 ft)
- Prominence: 22 m (72 ft)
- Parent peak: Waun Fach
- Listing: sub Hewitt, Nuttall

Naming
- Language of name: Welsh

Geography
- Location: Black Mountains, South Wales
- OS grid: SO210333
- Topo map: OS Landranger 161

Rhos Dirion is a top of Waun Fach in the Black Mountains in south-eastern Wales. It is the highest point on the Rhos Dirion - Chwarel y Fan ridge.

The summit is marked by a trig point and crowns an area of peat bog, heather and long grasses. Its northern face is precipitous.
