= Pen Allt-mawr =

Mountain (719.6m) in Powys, Wales

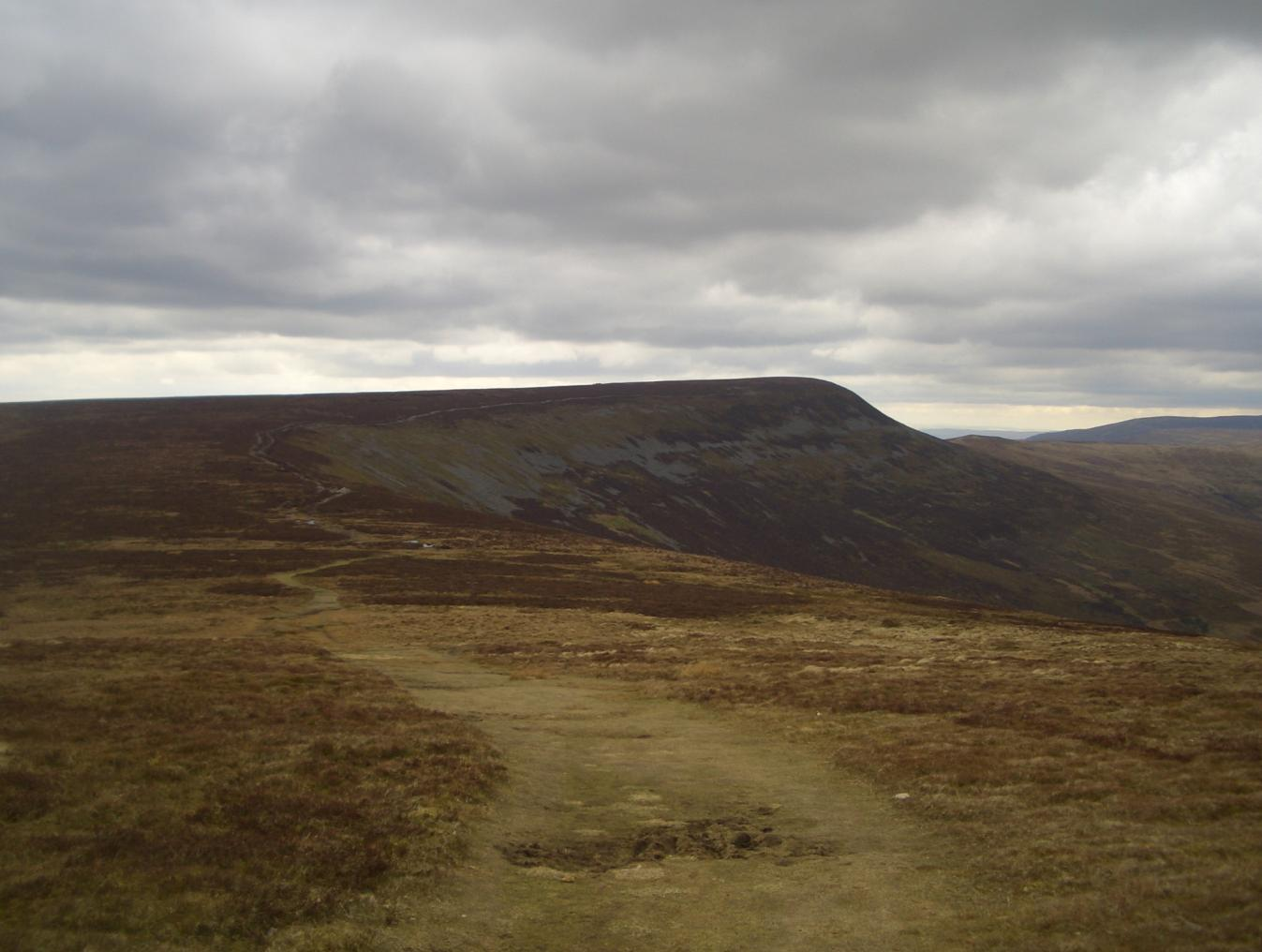
- Pen Allt-mawr from Pen Cerrig-calch

Highest point
- Elevation: 719 m (2,359 ft)
- Prominence: 103 m (338 ft)
- Parent peak: Waun Fach
- Listing: Hewitt, Nuttall, HuMP
- Coordinates: 51.9118°N 3.1544°W

Naming
- English translation: top of the big slope
- Language of name: Welsh

Geography
- Location: Black Mountains, South Wales
- OS grid: SO206243
- Topo map: OS Landranger 161

Listed summits of Pen Allt-mawr
Name	Grid ref	Height	Status
Pen Twyn Glas	SN969193	646 metres (2,119 ft)	sub Hewitt, Nuttall

Pen Allt-mawr is a 719 metres (2,359 ft) high subsidiary summit of Waun Fach and the third highest peak in the Black Mountains in south-eastern Wales. A very recognisable and prominent peak of the Black Mountains, it lies near the end of the more westerly of Waun Fach's two broad southern ridges. Its top Pen Twyn Glas is to the north, while its close neighbour Pen Cerrig-calch is to the south. A prominent spur 1 km to the SSW of the summit is known as Pen Gloch-y-pibwr. The stepped Bryniog ridge curves southward from this point.

Its summit is stony and has damaged Bronze Age cairns and a large shelter cairn together with a trig point. Further Bronze Age cairns are found along the western edge of the plateau to the south.

== Geology ==
The summit of Pen Allt-mawr is at the northern tip of a broadly triangular summit surface formed from a slab of southerly tilting upper Old Red Sandstone traditionally known as the Quartz Conglomerate. These rocks which date from the Late Devonian Epoch are continuous with those of Pen Cerrig-calch but other than a tiny outlier forming the summit of Sugar Loaf, are found nowhere else within the Black Mountains. Beneath the Quartz Conglomerate are the Early Devonian sandstones of the Brownstones Formation which form the upper slopes and summits of Pen Twyn Glas and Mynydd Llysiau to the north (though are barely seen). More readily eroded mudstone bands within this formation give rise to the stepped appearance of this hill and many of its neighbours. Sandstones of the Senni Formation (traditionally the 'Senni Beds') form the lower slopes of the mountain.
