= Waun Fach =

Mountain in Wales

Coordinates: 51.96292°N 3.14392°W

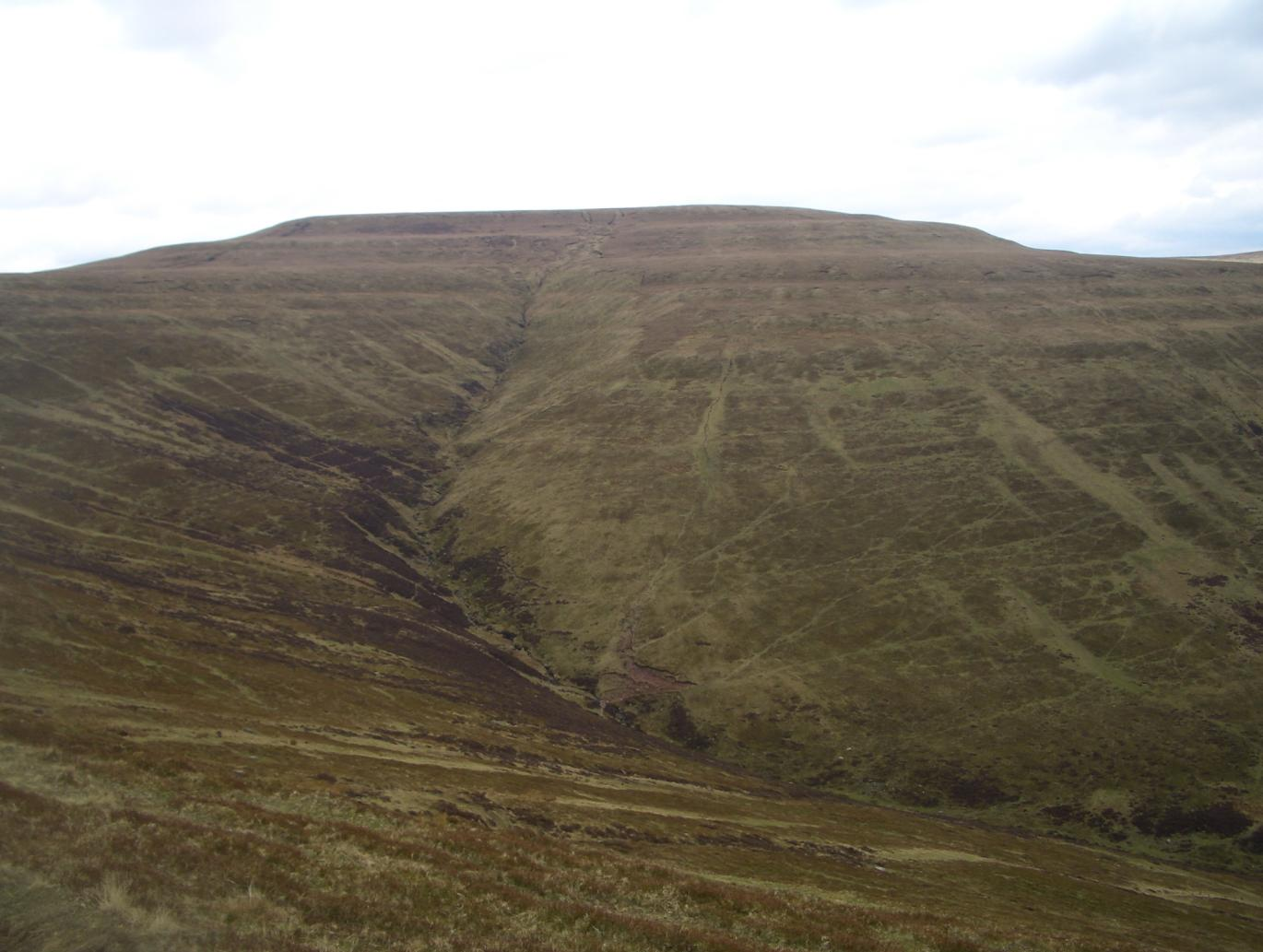
- Waun Fach from Mynydd Llysiau

Highest point
- Elevation: 811 m (2,661 ft)
- Prominence: 622 m (2,041 ft)
- Parent peak: Pen y Fan
- Listing: Marilyn, Hewitt, Nuttall

Naming
- English translation: small moor
- Language of name: Welsh
- Pronunciation: Welsh: [wai̯n ˈvaːχ]

Geography
- Location: Black Mountains, South Wales
- OS grid: SO215300
- Topo map: OS Landranger 161

Listed summits of Waun Fach
Name	Grid ref	Height	Status
Pen y Gadair Fawr	SN969193	800 metres (2,625 ft)	Hewitt, Nuttall
Pen Allt-mawr	SN969193	720 metres (2,362 ft)	Hewitt, Nuttall
Rhos Dirion	SN969193	713 metres (2,339 ft)	sub Hewitt, Nuttall
Pen Cerrig-calch	SN969193	701 metres (2,300 ft)	Hewitt, Nuttall
Twmpa	SN969193	690 metres (2,264 ft)	Hewitt, Nuttall
Chwarel y Fan	SN969193	679 metres (2,228 ft)	Hewitt, Nuttall
Mynydd Llysiau	SN969193	663 metres (2,175 ft)	Hewitt, Nuttall

Waun Fach is, with a summit height of 811 metres (2,661 ft), the highest mountain in the Black Mountains in south-eastern Wales. It is one of the three Marilyns over 600 m that make up the range, the others being Black Mountain and Mynydd Troed. To the north Rhos Fawr and the Radnor Forest can be seen. It is the third highest mountain in Britain south of Snowdonia (after Pen y Fan and its near neighbour Corn Du). It is situated at the head of the Grwyne Fechan valley, above and to the west of the Grwyne Fawr reservoir. It has an undistinguished (and almost indistinguishable) rounded summit. The nearby tops on the ridge, Pen Trumau and Pen y Gadair Fawr, although lower, are very much more recognisable.

== Geology ==
The summit and upper slopes of Waun Fach are formed from the Early Devonian Epoch sandstones of the Brownstones Formation, a division of the Old Red Sandstone. Beneath these and forming the lower slopes are the sandstones of the Senni Formation (traditionally the Senni Beds). Mudstone layers within these sandstones are more readily eroded and have given rise to the stepped appearance of parts of the mountain. No rocks are exposed around its summit as this is covered by a thick layer of peat which has accumulated in the postglacial period, though is much reduced through erosion in recent decades.

== Access ==
The hill is wholly within land mapped under the Countryside and Rights of Way Act 2000 as open country and hence is legally available to walkers despite there being no public rights of way leading to it. Mountain bikers and horseriders can follow the bridleways which lead to the 617m high col south of Pen Trumau but have no legal access to the hill itself. The paths approaching from the north and west have been repaired and improved by the Brecon Beacons National Park Authority, most recently through the Black Mountains Land Use Partnership in recent years, having previously become particularly damaged by use.
