= Black Mountains, United Kingdom =

Region of hills in Wales and England

Coordinates: 51°56′00″N 3°6′13″W

Black Mountains
- Y Mynydd Du or Y Mynyddoedd Duon (Welsh)
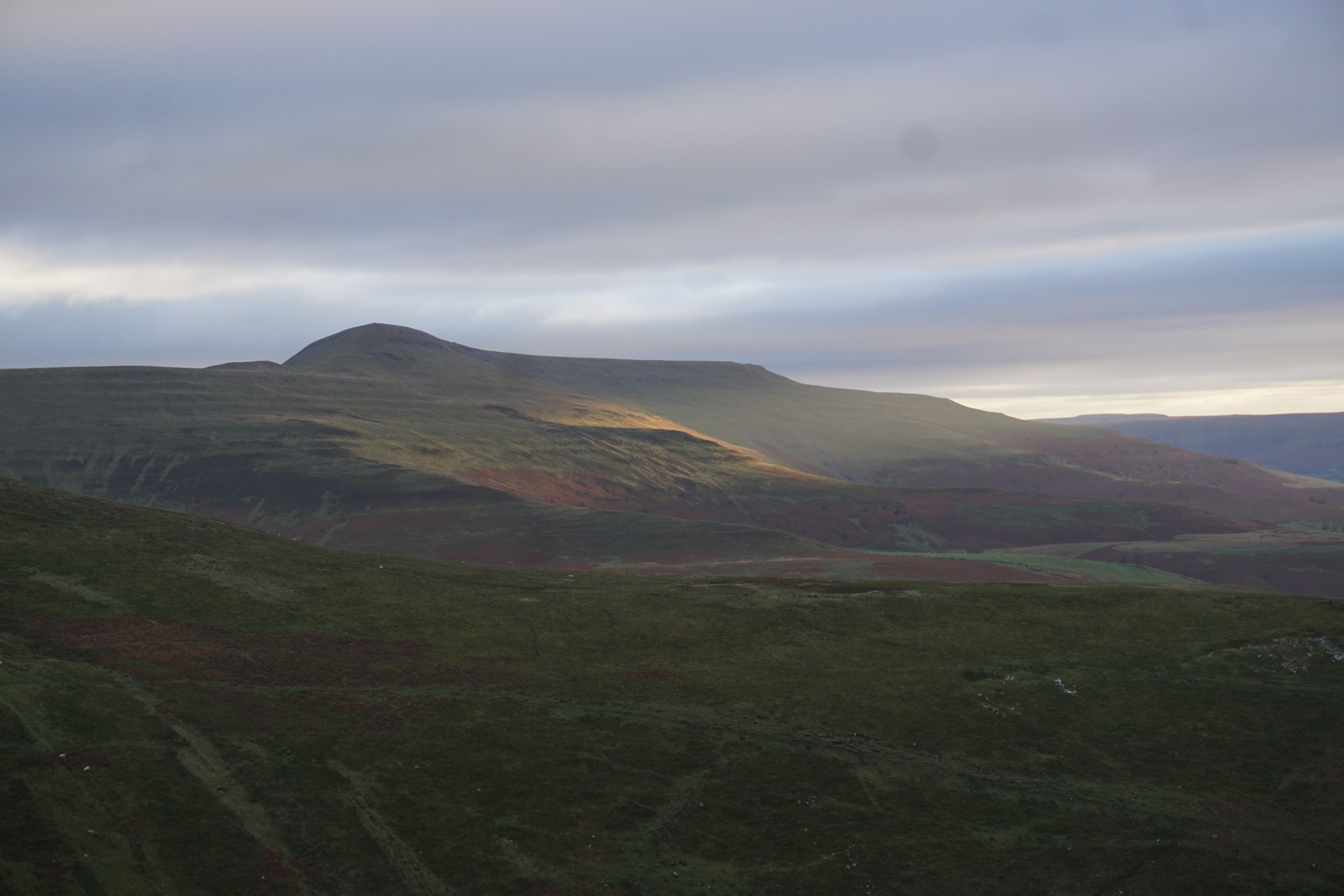
- The Black Mountains, with a view of Pen Cerrig-calch.

Highest point
- Peak: Waun Fach
- Elevation: 811 m (2,661 ft)

Geography
- Location within Wales
- Region(s): Wales & Herefordshire, United Kingdom

Geology
- Rock age: Devonian
- Rock type: Old Red Sandstone

The Black Mountains (Welsh: Y Mynydd Du or Y Mynyddoedd Duon) are a group of hills spanning the border between England and Wales, in the United Kingdom. The larger Welsh part is located in south-east Powys and north-west Monmouthshire, and the smaller English part in western Herefordshire. The range lies approximately within a triangle defined by Abergavenny in the south-east, Hay-on-Wye in the north, and Llangors in the west; Talgarth and Crickhowell are also nearby.

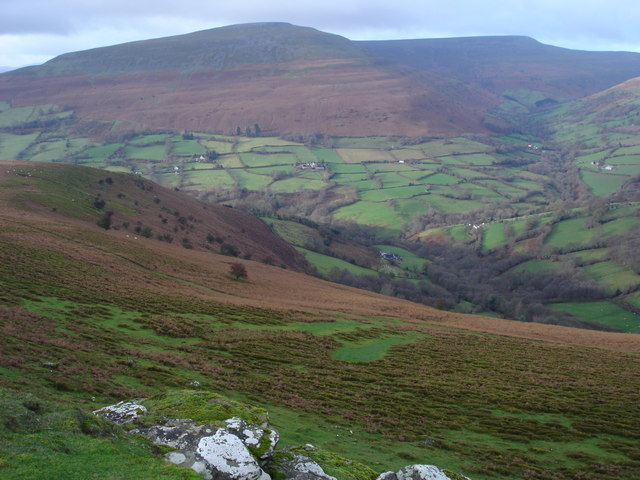
Pen Cerrig-calch and Pen Allt-mawr in the south-west of the Black Mountains range

The Welsh part of the Black Mountains is the easternmost of the four ranges of hills that comprise the Brecon Beacons National Park; it should not be confused with the westernmost, the similarly-named Black Mountain. The Black Mountains contain a peak called the Black Mountain, which is the highest point in southern England. The Gospel Pass road is the highest public road in Wales.

== Name ==
In his description of a Blak Montayne, the antiquarian John Leland refers to a massif extending between Carmarthen and Monmouth i.e. what is now considered to be the Brecon Beacons in the wider modern sense of that term, thus including the Black Mountain far to the west and the intervening high ground. There is a suggestion too that the names Hatterrall Hill and Mynydd y Gader may also once have been used to apply to the entire range of the Black Mountains though the former later became confined to the vicinity of its eastern ridge. The latter is now recognised in Pen y Gader-fawr (Pen y Gadair Fawr) and Gader Fawr (Gadair Fawr); names applied to the hill at SO 229288. Cadair, mutated to 'gadair' and anglicised as 'gader', means 'seat' or 'chair' in Welsh. The Welsh name for these hills is traditionally Y Mynydd Du ('the black mountain') though in more recent times the name Y Mynyddoedd Duon ('the black mountains') has been used, being a retranslation from the English.

== Mountains ==
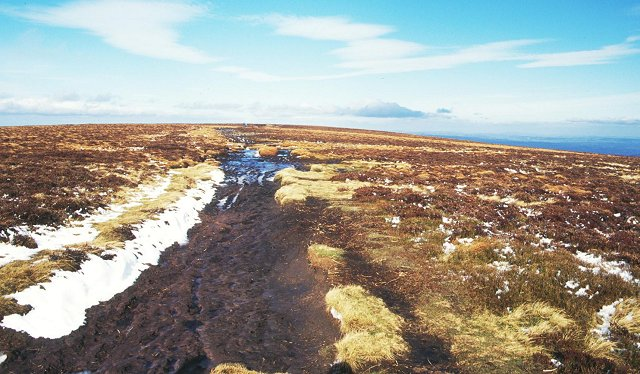
The summit of Black Mountain crossed by the Offa's Dyke Path

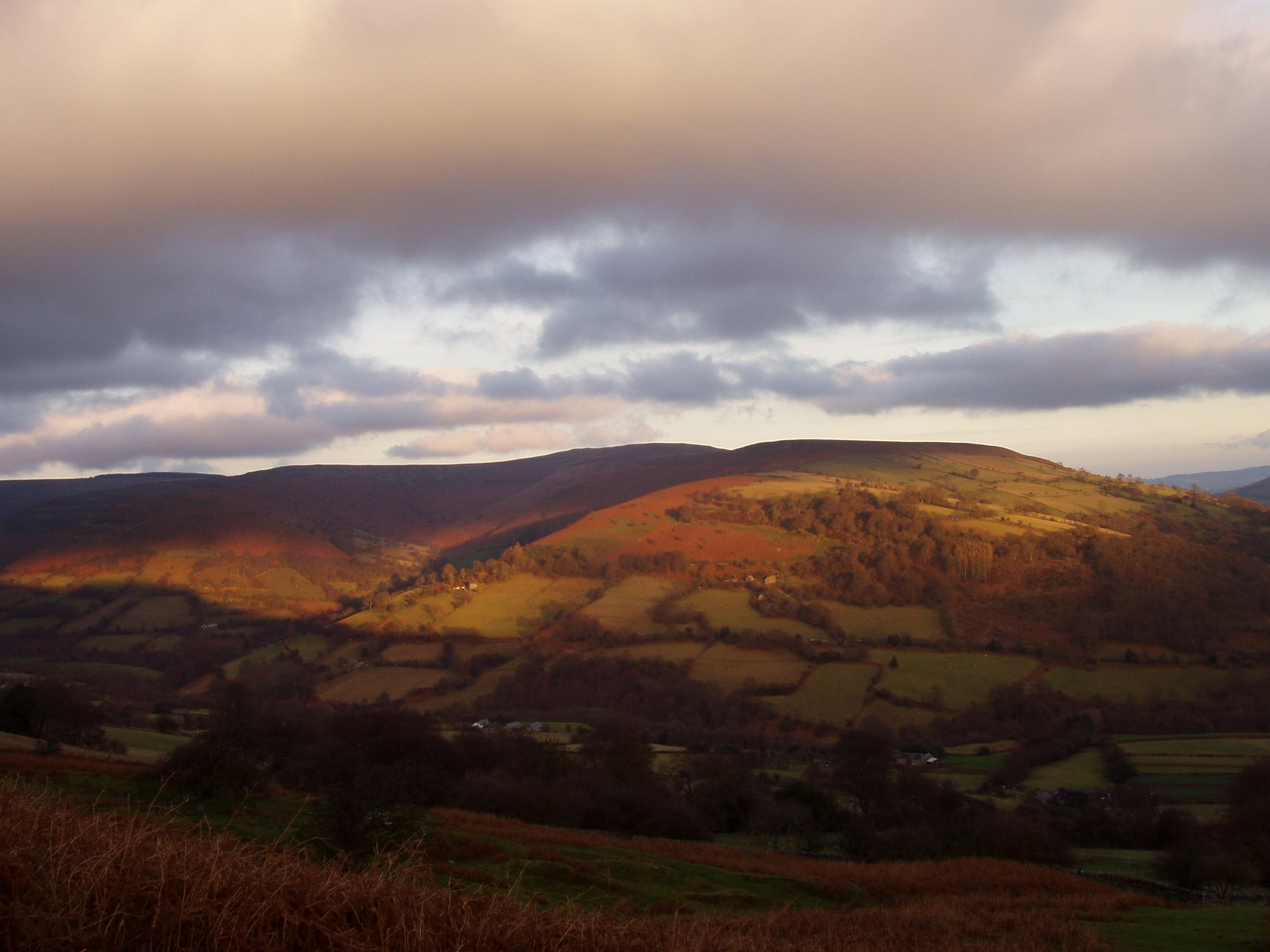
The southern part of the Grwyne Fechan valley in the Black Mountains

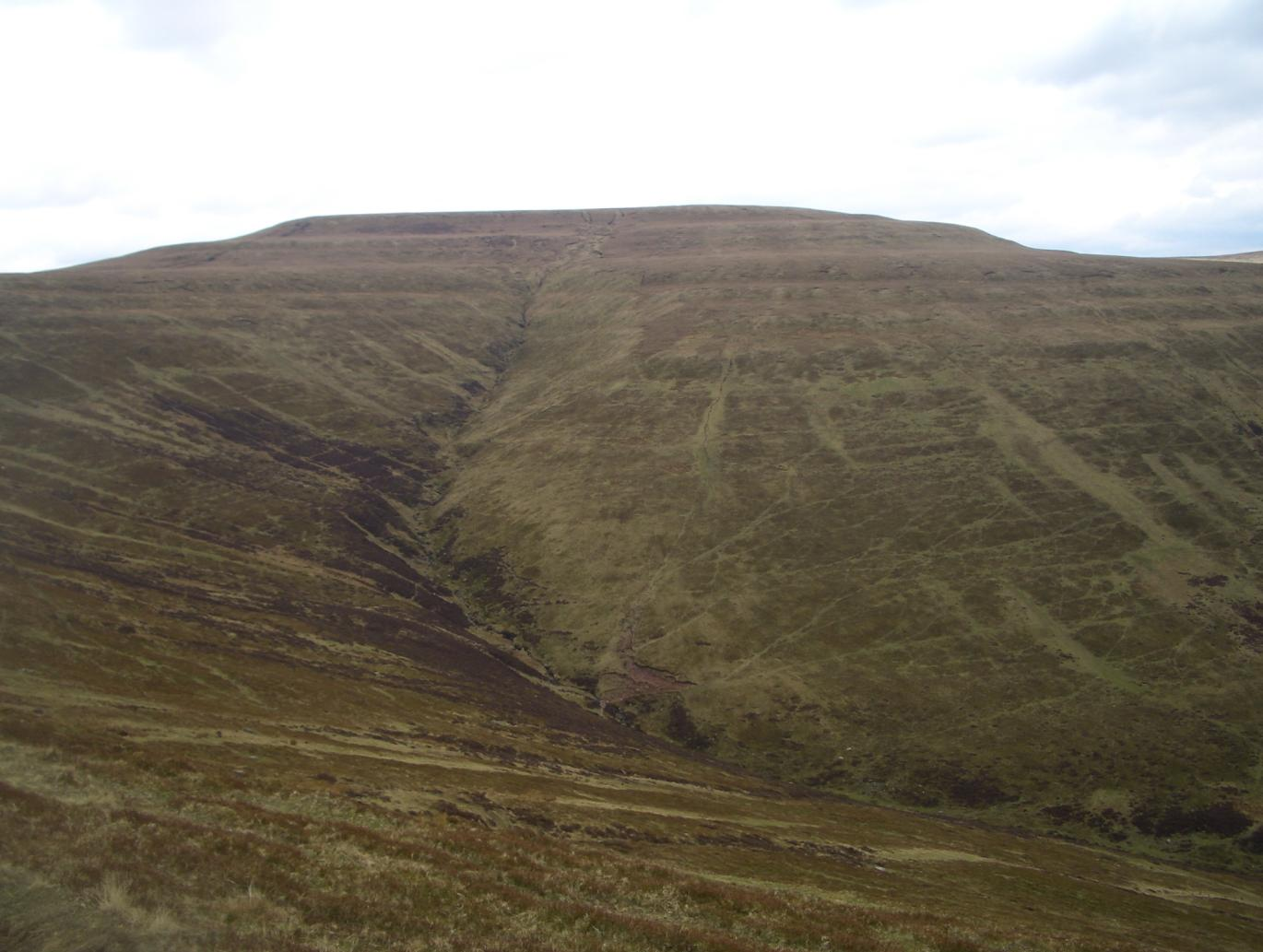
Waun Fach from Mynydd Llysiau

The highest mountain in the group is Waun Fach whose heavily eroded peat summit plateau attains a height of 811 metres (2,661 ft). Its secondary summit Pen y Gadair Fawr at 800 metres (2,625 ft) has a more distinctive peak shape. On the eastern ridge, the 703 metres (2,306 ft) peak of Black Mountain stands on the Wales-England border, and is the highest point in England south of Great Whernside in Yorkshire. Other summits towards the northern end are Hay Bluff (Welsh: Penybegwn), 677 metres (2,221 ft), Rhos Dirion, 713 metres (2,339 ft) and Lord Hereford's Knob or Twmpa, 690 metres (2,264 ft). Towards the south of the range are the more independent summits of Crug Mawr at 550 metres (1,804 ft), Pen Allt-mawr at 719 metres (2,359 ft) and the 701 metres (2,300 ft) peak of Pen Cerrig-calch which rises prominently above Crickhowell in the Usk Valley.

Outlying summits, all of which are classed as Marilyns, include the Sugar Loaf (Welsh: Pen-y-Fal), Mynydd Troed and Mynydd Llangorse. The lower and separate hills of Allt yr Esgair, Myarth, Bryn Arw and Ysgyryd Fawr (also known as 'The Skirrid', Skyrrid or 'Holy Mountain') are scattered along the southern fringe of the Black Mountains.

In his work People of the Black Mountains, Raymond Williams described the Black Mountains thus:

See this layered sandstone in the short mountain grass. Place your right hand on it, palm downward. See where the summer sun rises and where it stands at noon. Direct your index finger midway between them. Spread your fingers, not widely. You now hold this place in your hand.

The six rivers rise in the plateau towards your wrist. The first river, now called Mynwy, flows at the outside edge of your thumb. The second river, now called Olchon, flows between your thumb and the first finger, to join the Mynwy at the top of your thumb. The third river, now called Honddu, flows between your first and second fingers and then curves to join the Mynwy. The fourth river, now called Grwyne Fawr, flows between your second and third fingers and then curves the other way, south, to join the fifth river, now called Grwyne Fechan, that has been flowing between your third and your outside finger. The sixth river, now called Rhiangoll, flows at the edge of your outside finger.

This is the hand of the Black Mountains, the shape first learned. Your thumb is Crib y Gath. Your first finger is Curum and Hateral. Your second finger is Ffawyddog, with Tal y Cefn and Bal Mawr at its knuckles. Your third finger is Gadair Fawr. Your outside finger is Allt Mawr, from Llysiau to Cerrig Calch and its nail is Crug Hywel. On the high plateau of the back of your hand are Twyn y Llech and Twmpa, Rhos Dirion, Waun Fach and Y Das. You hold their shapes and their names.

== Geology ==
=== Bedrock ===
The Black Mountains are composed almost exclusively of rocks assigned to the Old Red Sandstone dating from the Devonian period. This thick sedimentary sequence is largely terrestrial in origin, comprising a range of alluvial sediments from conglomerates and sandstones to mudstones and siltstones and includes a few thin secondary limestones. The exception is the summit area of Pen Cerrig-calch where a thin sequence of Carboniferous rocks occur, an outlier of the more extensive outcrop to the south of the Usk valley. The lower slopes of these hills are formed from the mudstone-rich Freshwater West Formation (formerly the St Maughans beds) at the top of which lies a calcrete – a discontinuous limestone band known as the Ffynnon Limestone. Above this is the sandstone-dominated Senni Formation (formerly Senni Beds) which provide the upper reaches of much of the range. Higher again are the Brownstones which form the summit areas of the central and southern parts of the range.

The Old Red Sandstone extends back into the late Silurian period and forward into the earliest part of the Carboniferous period. The familiar red colour of these rocks arises from the presence of iron oxide but not all the Old Red Sandstone is red; colours can range from grey and green through red to purple.

=== Glacial legacy ===
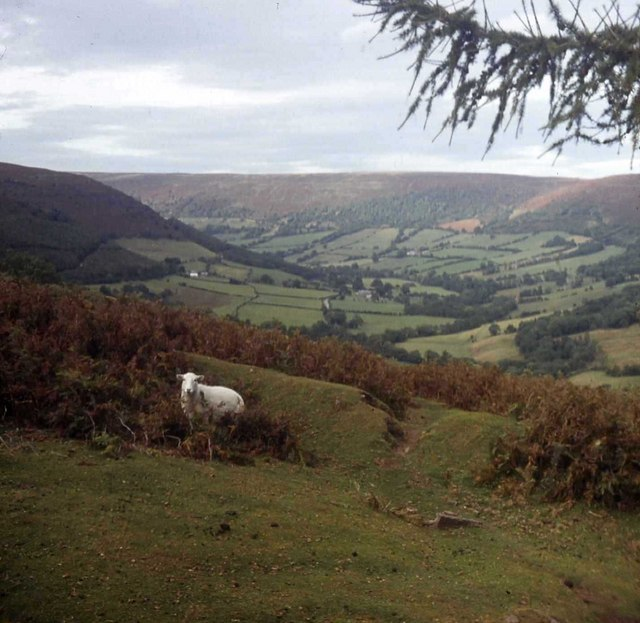
View up the Vale of Ewyas

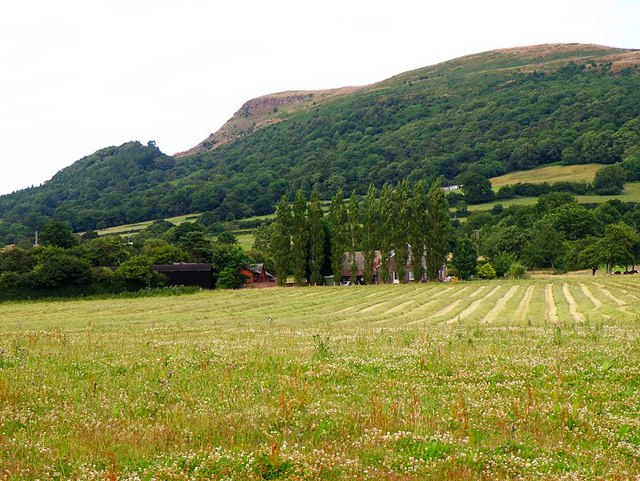
The large landslip at the north end of the Skirrid

The area has been subject to at least two major glacial episodes; the Anglian glaciation of 450,000 years ago and the Devensian which reached its peak around 22,000 years ago. During the Devensian ice age, the massif lay at the margin of the British ice-sheet. Glacial ice from the Wye and Usk valleys covered low ground around the massif at this time; a piedmont lobe of the Wye valley glacier extended as far as the western edge of Hereford, leaving an arcuate terminal moraine in place. During its subsequent retreat the glacier left recessional moraines at Stretton Sugwas, Staunton on Wye and Clyro. Wye valley ice overtopped the cols at Pengenffordd at the head of the Rhiangoll, as evidenced by non-local rock fragments within the glacial till, but did not otherwise invade the range; these hills were shaped by ice from sources to the west and in mid-Wales rather than generating any major glaciers of their own. The valleys of the Grwyne Fawr and Grwyne Fechan were probably ice-free during the last ice age. The Usk valley glacier wrapped around the southern margin of the massif, forming another couple of piedmont lobes south and east of Abergavenny. A terminal moraine at Llanvihangel Crucorney may be the legacy of either Honddu or Usk valley ice.

=== Landslips ===
Landslips, mainly of a translational character, have occurred widely throughout the Black Mountains but notably in the east around the boundary between the Freshwater West Formation and the overlying Senni Formation which marks an active spring-line associated with the Ffynnon Limestone. Though undated, it’s likely that most were initiated in periglacial conditions, though prior over-steepening of slopes by glacial erosion has been a factor. Several have been recorded in the Vale of Ewyas, including that at Darren and the active one at Cwmyoy which continues to slowly distort St Martin's Church. Further landslips have occurred at Black Darren and Red Daren ('tarren' signifies 'edge' in Welsh) on the eastern side of the Hatterrall ridge west of Longtown. Multiple slips affect the Skirrid just to the east of Abergavenny, with the rotational slip on the northwestern flank of the hill being especially prominent when seen from the north, but also visible from the south, such is the scale of the feature.

=== Exploitation ===
Scattered around the range are innumerable small quarries, virtually all of which now lie abandoned, once a source of walling and roofing stone for local use. In places the thin Devonian limestones were worked to feed limekilns for the production of lime for agricultural use and in buildings. Old Red Sandstone has also frequently been used in buildings in Herefordshire, Monmouthshire and the former Brecknockshire (now south Powys) of south Wales.

== Activities in the Black Mountains ==
The area is popular with hillwalkers, mountainbikers and horseriders. The Offa's Dyke National Trail runs along the border between England and Wales, whilst the Beacons Way, Cambrian Way and Marches Way also pass through the Black Mountains. The Three Rivers Ride runs along the northern slopes of the massif. The range's northern escarpment offers opportunities for gliding, at places like the Black Mountains Gliding Club in Talgarth, hang gliding and paragliding as winds are forced up and over the hills. Exercise Long Reach takes place in the Black Mountains.

== Local attractions ==
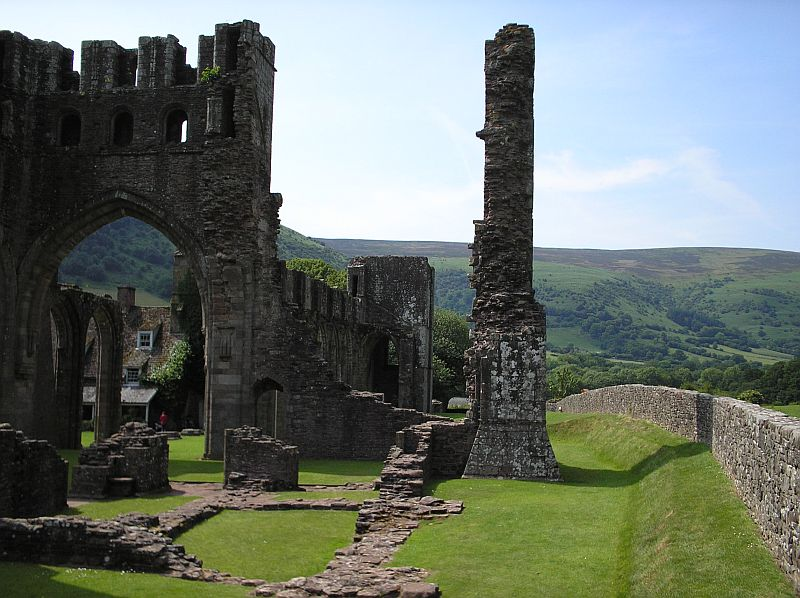
Llanthony Priory

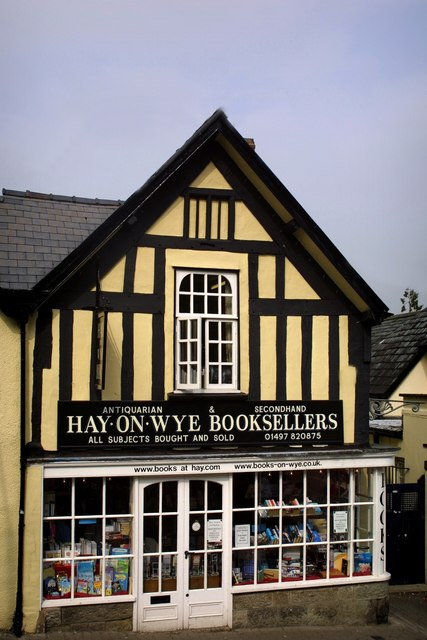
Bookshop in Hay-on-Wye

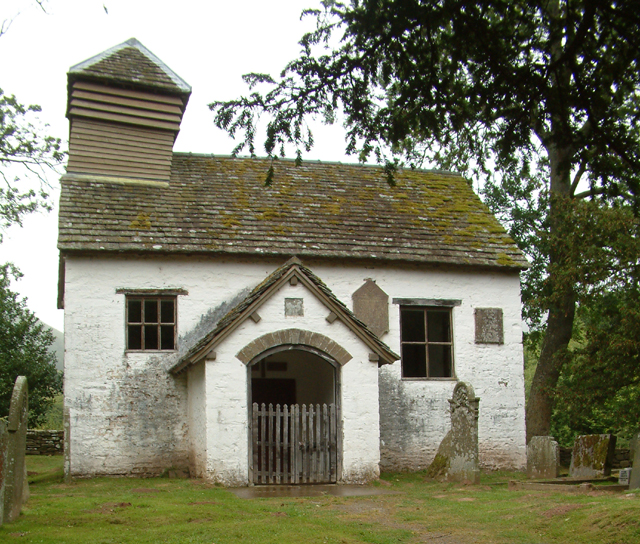
St Mary's Chapel at Capel-y-ffin

There are several villages and hamlets in this area. The Skirrid Mountain Inn has been claimed as the oldest public house in Wales and mentioned in records from AD 1100. Antiquities include Llanthony Priory in the Vale of Ewyas, ruined Craswall Priory, Tretower Castle, Tretower Court, the Iron Age hill fort of Crug Hywel, and the remains of Castell Dinas, an 11th to 13th century castle built on the site of an Iron Age hillfort between Talgarth and Crickhowell. Cwmyoy and Partrishow churches are also located nearby.
The youth hostel at Capel-y-ffin closed in late 2007. Hay-on-Wye which promotes itself as the 'town of books', lies just to the north. It was the first book town to be established, and there are more than two dozen second-hand bookshops.

== Towns and villages ==
Settlements in and around the Black Mountains include Hay-on-Wye, Llangors, Talgarth, Crickhowell, Cwmdu, each in Powys, Abergavenny in Monmouthshire and Longtown in Herefordshire. Many act as bases for accessing the hills all year round.

== Cultural associations ==
The controversial artist and typeface designer Eric Gill lived at Capel-y-ffin between 1924 and 1928. The artist and poet David Jones worked in the area during the same period.

== Fiction ==
Books set in or around the Black Mountains include:

- People of the Black Mountains by Raymond Williams (two books of an intended trilogy)
- On The Black Hill by Bruce Chatwin (also adapted as a film)
- Resistance by Owen Sheers (adapted as a film in 2011)
- Running for the Hills: a family story by Horatio Clare
