= Fan y Big =

Hill (716.7m) in Powys, Wales

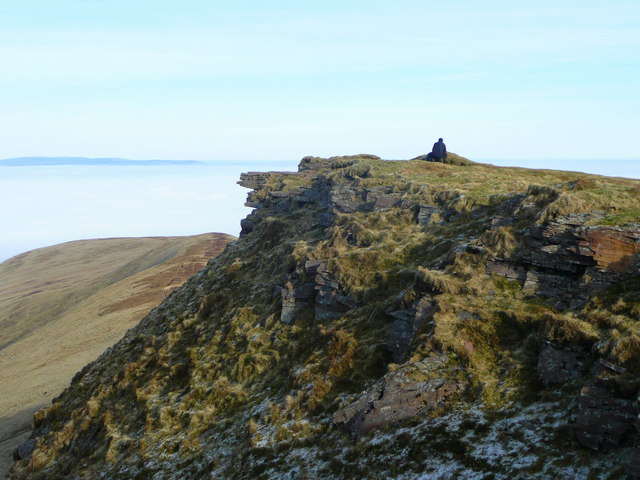
- Summit of Fan y Big

Highest point
- Elevation: 716.7 m (2,351 ft)
- Prominence: 28.5 m (94 ft)
- Parent peak: Waun Rydd
- Listing: Nuttall
- Coordinates: 51.8762°N 3.401°W

Naming
- Native name: Fan y Bîg (Welsh)
- English translation: peak/beacon of the mountain

Geography
- Location: Powys, Wales
- Parent range: Brecon Beacons
- OS grid: SO036206
- Topo map: OS Landranger 160

Fan y Big (Welsh: Fan y Bîg; pronounced [van ə ˈbiːg]) is a subsidiary summit of Waun Rydd in the Brecon Beacons National Park, in southern Powys, Wales. It is 716.7 m (2,351 ft) high and is often hiked as part of the Horseshoe Walk, a traverse of the four main peaks in the Brecon Beacons.

== The hill ==
At 716.7 m (2,351 ft), Fan y Big lies at the western tip of the Gwaun Cerrig Llwydion plateau. Its name translates as 'point of the peak' - perhaps in allusion to its striking pointed shape, as seen from some directions. The summit is smooth and grassy, but marked by a cairn, which stands on the edge of its precipitous western face. The view of this face from Cribyn is regarded as very striking. Fan y Big has since lost its status as a Hewitt.

== Access ==
The peak is prominent on the north facing escarpment of the central part of the Brecon Beacons and three footpaths meet at the summit. All the surrounding land is open access and so walkers can go where they wish. In poor weather however, the paths are the safest route for access. The peak is often crossed by hikers aiming for Cribyn, Pen y Fan and Corn Du, and also forms part of the Fan dance, or Horseshoe Walk, a circular route that traverses four peaks.

== Geology ==
In common with other peaks of the Brecon Beacons, the upper slopes of Fan y Big are formed from sandstones of the Brownstones Formation of the Old Red Sandstone laid down during the Devonian period. The lower slopes of the hill are formed from sandstones and mudstones of the underlying Senni Formation. The rock strata tilt gently southwards. The valleys to the northwest and east nurtured small glaciers during the last ice age. This glacial erosion resulted in the very steep northern face which the mountain possesses.
