= Afon Tarell =

River in Powys, Wales

Afon Tarell River Tarell
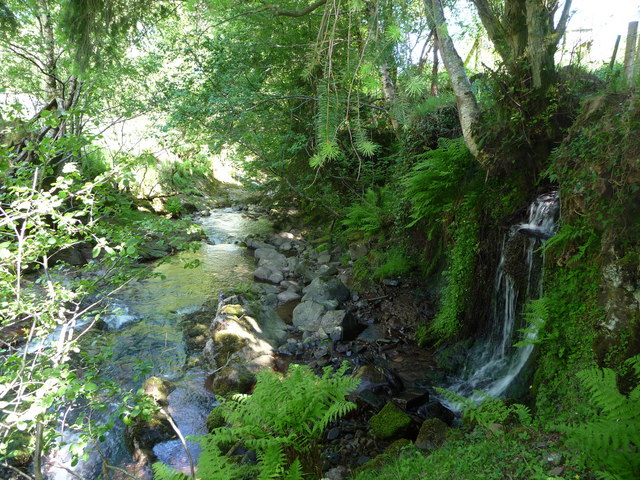
- Upper reaches of Afon Tarell

Location
- Sovereign state: United Kingdom
- Country: Wales
- County: Powys

Physical characteristics
- Source
  - location: Pen y Fan, Powys, Wales
  - coordinates: 51°52′0.48″N 3°29′20.04″W
  - elevation: 562 m (1,844 ft)
- Mouth: River Usk
  - location: Brecon, Powys, Wales
  - coordinates: 51°56′58.56″N 3°24′0″W
  - elevation: 135 m (443 ft)
- Length: 20.0 km (12.4 mi)
- Discharge
  - location: River Usk

Basin features
- Tributaries
  - right: Nant Cwm Llwch

Afon Tarell (Welsh for 'River Tarell') is a river in Powys, Wales, which rises to the west of the Brecon Beacons in Brecon Beacons National Park and flows north, then north-east, for 12 miles (20 km) into the River Usk.

The river is followed for its entire length through Glyn Tarell ('the Tarell valley') by the A470 road, passing by the hamlets of Libanus and Tai'r Bull and entering the Usk at Llanfaes on the southern edge of Brecon.

The most significant tributary of the river is Nant Cwm Llwch, which enters the Tarell on its right bank between Tai'r Bull and Llanfaes. This secondary river emerges from the glacial lake of Llyn Cwm Llwch beneath Pen y Fan.

The name may have its origins in the old Welsh language words "tarddu" 'to bubble out', and "tarddell 'a spring or source'.

Afon Tarell, in common with the Usk and its other tributaries, is designated as a special area of conservation for its three species of lamprey, twaite shad, European bullhead, Atlantic salmon and otter.
