= Llyn Cwm Llwch =

Small lake in Wales

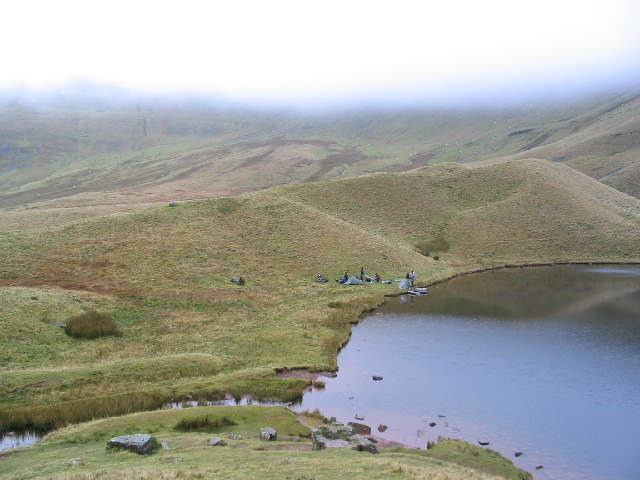
- Wild camping at Llyn Cwm Llwch

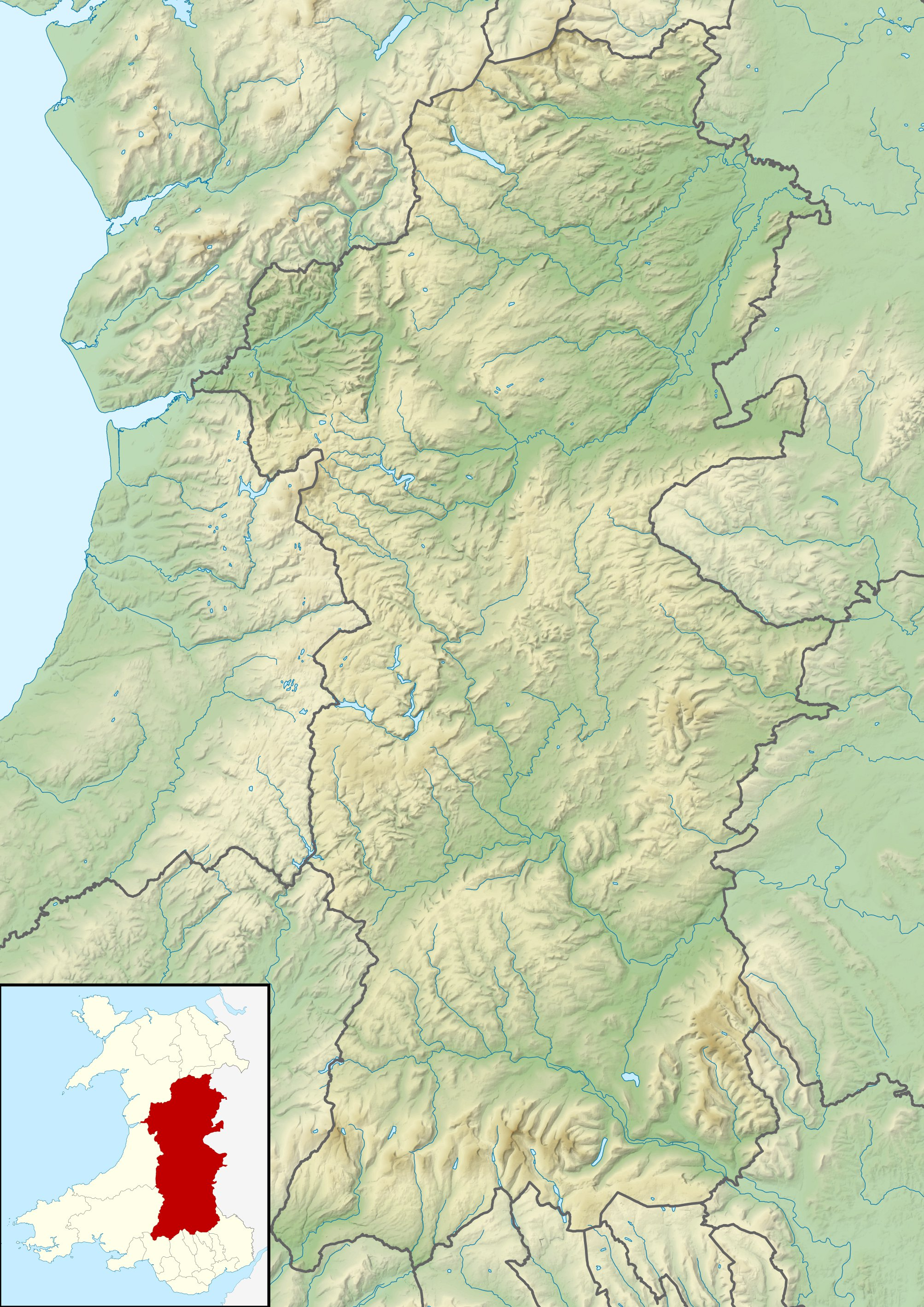
- Location within Powys
- Location: Powys, Wales
- Coordinates: 51°53′15″N 3°27′6″W
- Primary outflows: Nant Cwm Llwch
- Basin countries: United Kingdom

Llyn Cwm Llwch (Welsh: [ɬɪn kʊm ɬuːχ]) is a small lake or pool in the Brecon Beacons National Park in Powys, Wales. It is between 1 and 2 acres: much smaller than the two glacial lakes in the west of the Black Mountain (range): Llyn y Fan Fawr and Llyn y Fan Fach, and one of the few natural bodies of water in the park. It is of glacial origin, occupying a rock hollow beneath the peaks of Pen y Fan and Corn Du in the central Brecon Beacons. It is drained by the Nant Cwm Llwch which empties into the Afon Tarell, which itself enters the River Usk at Brecon. Tommy Jones' obelisk, a memorial in granite to a young boy who died near this spot in 1900, overlooks the lake.

== Geology ==
The lake occupies a hollow excavated in the sandstones of the Brownstones Formation of the Old Red Sandstone by glacial action during the succession of recent ice ages. Its northern margins are rimmed by a large curved late-glacial moraine.

== Access ==
The lake is within open country and readily accessible to walkers. A popular path up to Pen y Fan runs southwards up Cwm Llwch, passing by the outlet of the lake. The lake is seen to advantage from the peaks of both Pen y Fan and Corn Du and indeed from the spur of Pen Milan to its west.

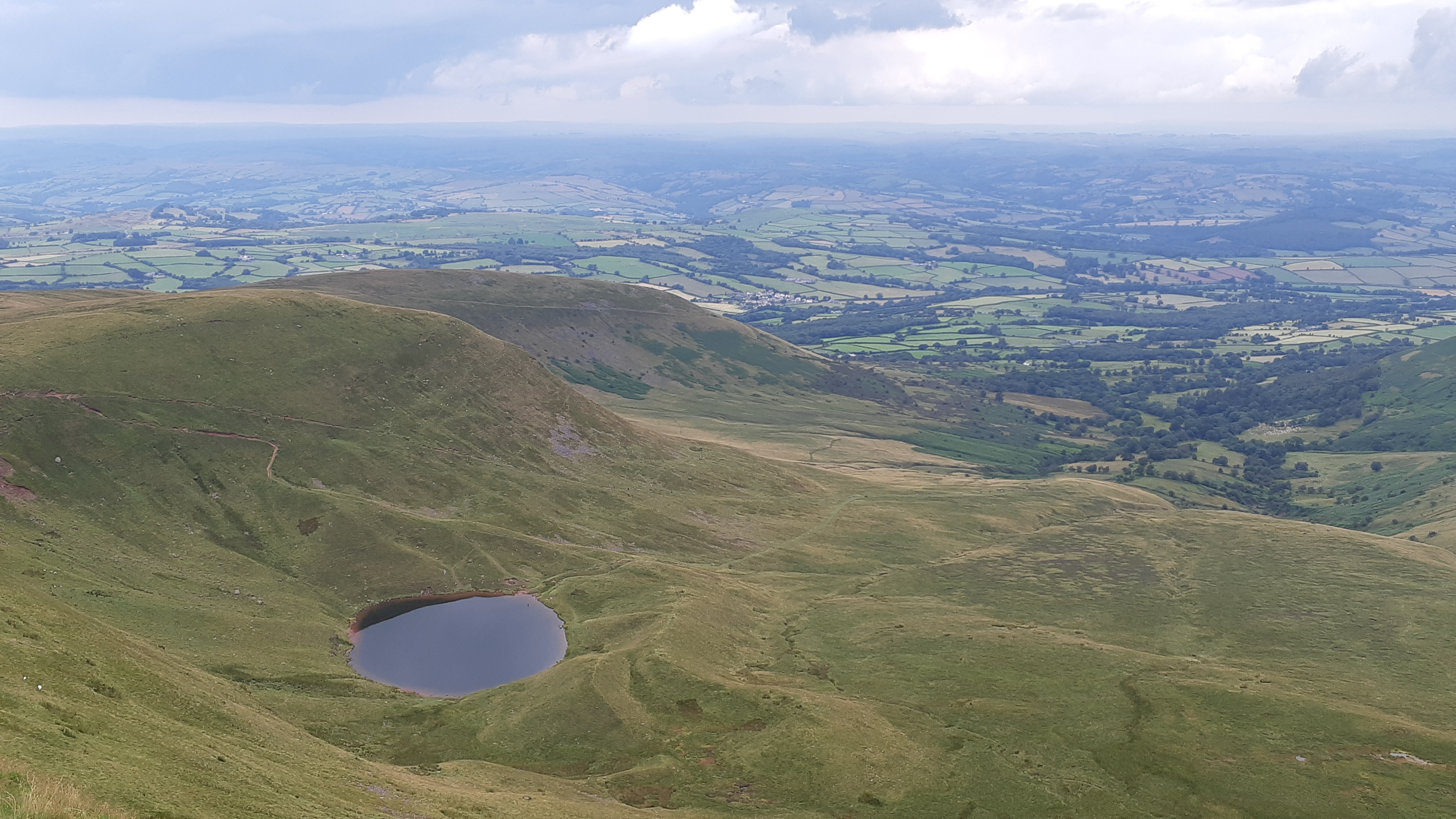
Llyn Cwm Llwch viewed from the peak at Corn Du
