= UK Joint Special Forces Selection =

Selection and training process

UK Joint Special Forces Selection is the selection and training process for candidates of the United Kingdom Special Forces: Special Air Service, Special Boat Service, and Special Reconnaissance Regiment. Members of the SAS and SBS undergo selection up to the award of a sand-coloured beret to SAS personnel, whereupon SBS candidates undergo further selection to qualify as Swimmer Canoeists, and SAS personnel undergo further specialist training. SRR candidates undergo the Aptitude Phase, before going on to their own specialist covert surveillance and reconnaissance training.

The first version of the SAS selection course was created by John Woodhouse in 1952. Until the late 1990s, candidates for the SAS and SBS underwent selection separately. Selection is held twice per year, in the summer and in the winter. Typically, fewer than 10% of candidates make it through the selection process.

== Phases ==
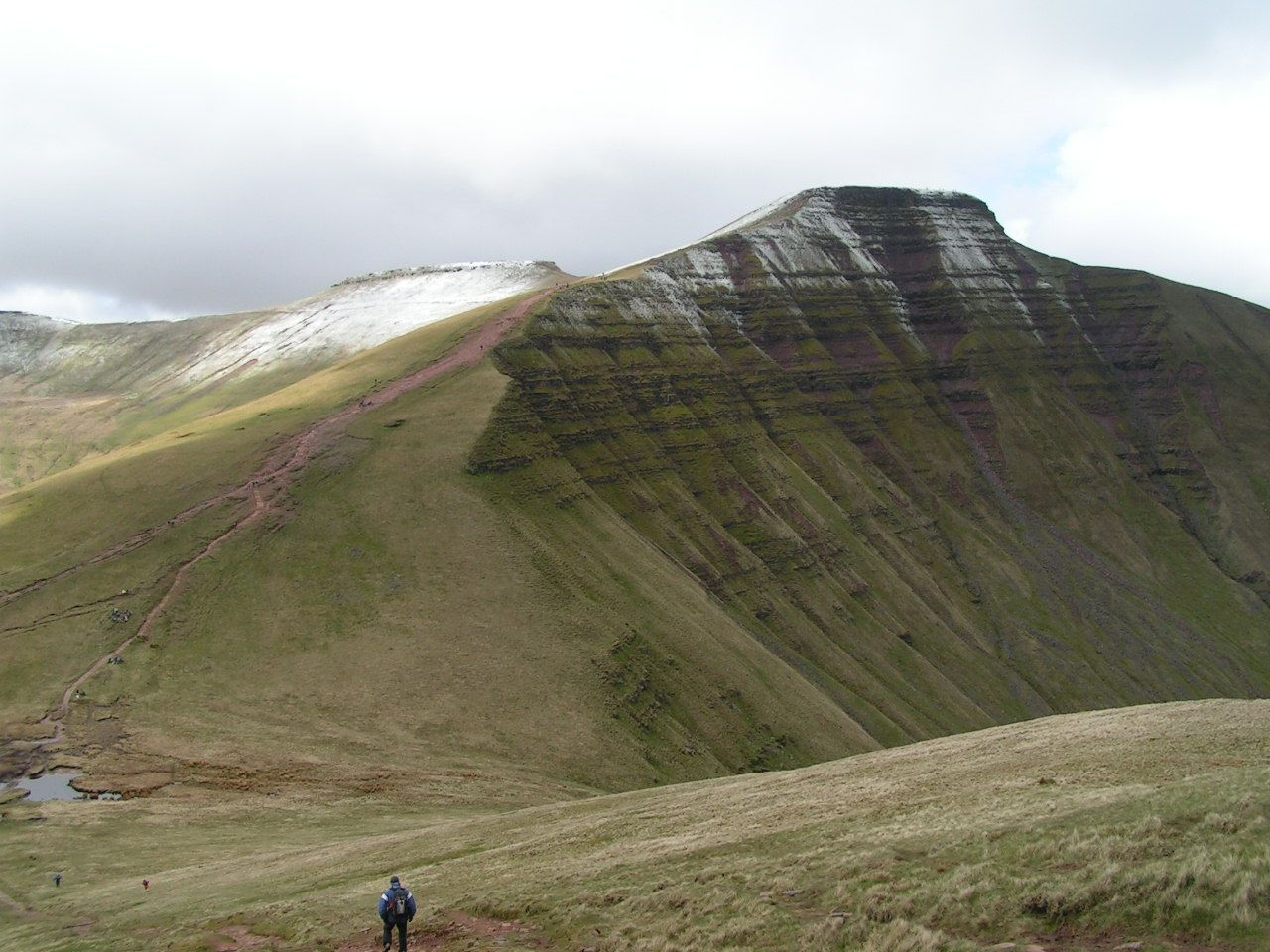
Pen y Fan, the highest peak in the Brecon Beacons which is the focus of the 'Long Drag', the final endurance test of the fitness and navigation 'Hills Phase' of UKSF selection.

To be eligible for selection, a candidate must be under the age of 32, have served in the armed forces for at least two years, have three years left to serve and be recommended for service in UKSF by their Commanding Officer (CO).

=== UKSF Briefing Course ===
This five-day programme tests basic fitness and skills such as swimming and map reading. The swim test consists of a high water entry (10 m), treading water for 3 minutes, followed immediately by a 500 m timed swim, then a 10 m underwater swim to recover a small weight from the bottom of the water. Candidates are interviewed individually on their motivation for joining UKSF.

=== Aptitude ===
The Aptitude Phase, commonly referred to as Hills Phase, takes place in the Brecon Beacons, with candidates based at Sennybridge Camp. This is the endurance and navigation portion of selection and tests for physical fitness, mental determination, and capacity for self-sufficiency. The Hills Phase lasts four weeks, with candidates having to perform increasingly difficult loaded marches, navigating between checkpoints individually using only a compass and hand-drawn sketch map.

Exercise High Walk, known as the Fan Dance, is a 26 km march that takes place at the end of the first week of the phase. It is used as the first major indicator of whether a candidate has the physical and mental aptitude to complete selection. The candidates climb Pen y Fan's west slope (facing Corn Du) and then descend on the far side, known as Jacob's Ladder. The rest of the route follows the old Roman road, before going back on itself, ascending Pen y Fan again for the return leg. Candidates are allowed 4 hours 10 minutes to complete the route.

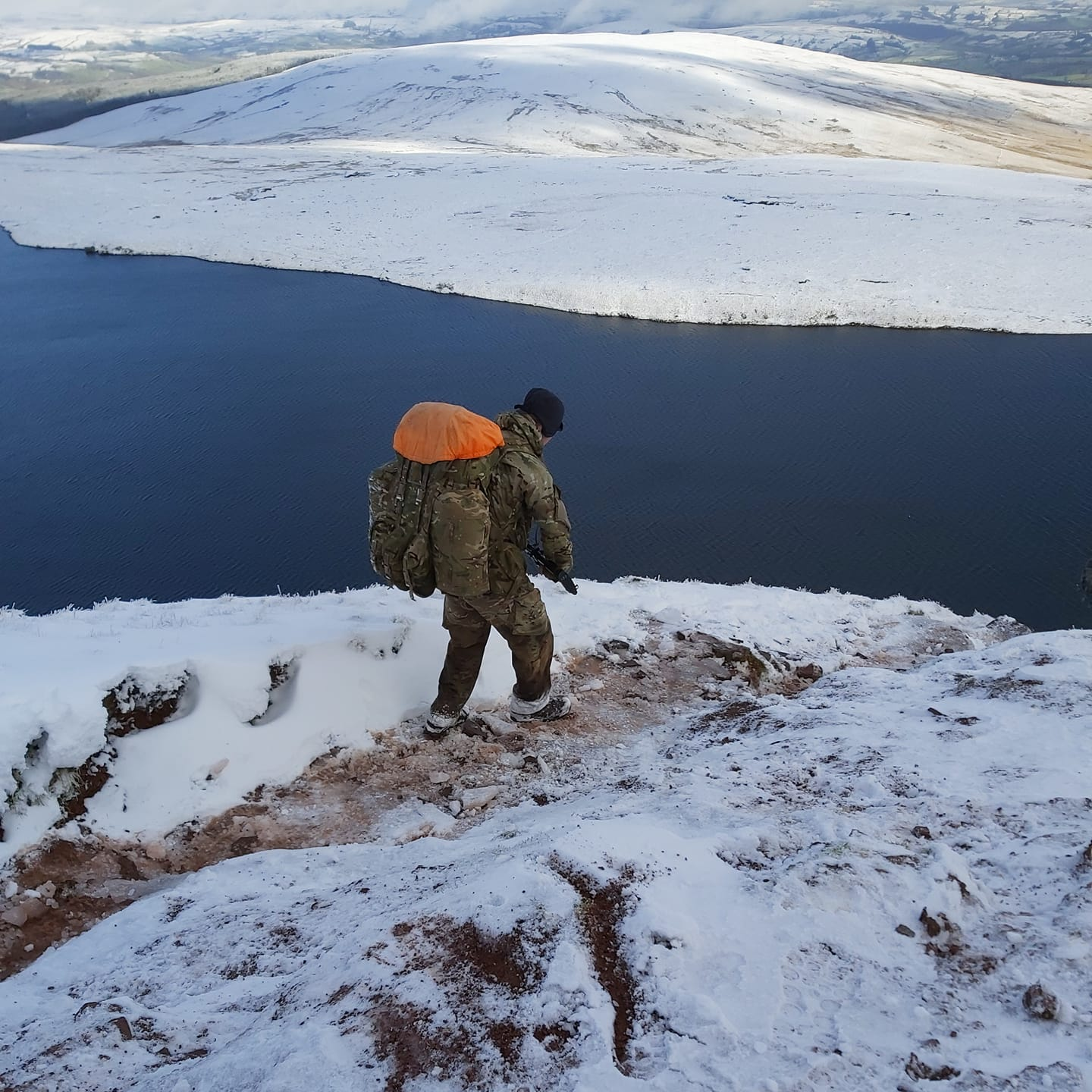
A member of British Armed Forces training in the Brecon Beacons, potentially on UKSF Selection, above Llyn y Fan Fawr.

In 2013, three Army reservists died while undertaking the Fan Dance. They collapsed at the end of the march, after temperatures soared to 30 °C, while they had carried a rifle and bergen weighing at least 27 kg.

This phase culminates with the 'Long Drag', a 64 km trek carrying a 25 kg bergen (not including food, water, and a rifle), that must be completed in under 20 hours, navigating from checkpoint to checkpoint individually and against the clock, throughout the day and regardless of the weather conditions. Candidates are forbidden from using paths and trails.

Andy McNab, former sergeant in the SAS, stated that at the end of the Hills Phase, his group had gone from 220 down to 24 candidates.

=== Standard Operating Procedures and Tactics Course ===
The second phase of selection consists of 14 weeks of SF tactics, techniques and procedures training, held at a candidates' unit: Stirling Lines for the SAS, and RM Poole for the SBS. Soldiers are taught advanced weapon handling with weapons used by UKSF, as well as weapons used by foreign militaries and adversaries. Patrolling, ambush, break contact, close target reconnaissance, demolitions, vehicle handling, close-quarters combat (CQB), battlefield casualty, and dynamic shooting drills are also learnt. Candidates who cannot learn and apply these skills are returned to their unit (RTU).

=== Jungle ===
The third phase of selection takes place deep in the jungle of Brunei or Belize. Candidates are expected to apply and demonstrate skills learned from continuation training, whilst in an arduous, humid, dirty, wet, hot environment, where toxic and poisonous animals and plants are rife, and a simple cut could lead to a problematic infection. Candidates are watched and assessed constantly by the Directing Staff (DS). Soldiers use live rounds, and simulate being a member of a four-soldier jungle long-range reconnaissance patrol (LRRP), deep behind enemy lines, for a month.

== Further training ==
=== SF Parachute Course ===
Mandatory for all UKSF. Operators are trained in High altitude/high opening and High Altitude Low Opening by the Parachute Training Squadron, Airborne Delivery Wing at RAF Brize Norton.

=== Swimmer Canoeist (SC3) ===
For SBS personnel only, the SC3 course involves training and diving in all conditions, canoeing (often over long distances), underwater demolitions, beach reconnaissance and surveying techniques.

== See also ==
- Special Air Service Selection
- Special Boat Service Selection
