= Fan dance (disambiguation) =

A fan dance is a dance with fans.

Fan dance may also refer to:

- Korean fan dance
- Vietnamese fan dance
- Fan Dance (album), a Sam Phillips album
- Fan Dance (exercise), a military exercise
- CFA-44 Nosferatu (NATO reporting name "Fandance"), a fictional aircraft in Ace Combat 6: Fires of Liberation
