= Y Gyrn =

Hill (618.7m) in Powys, Wales

Coordinates: 51.88328°N 3.43684°W

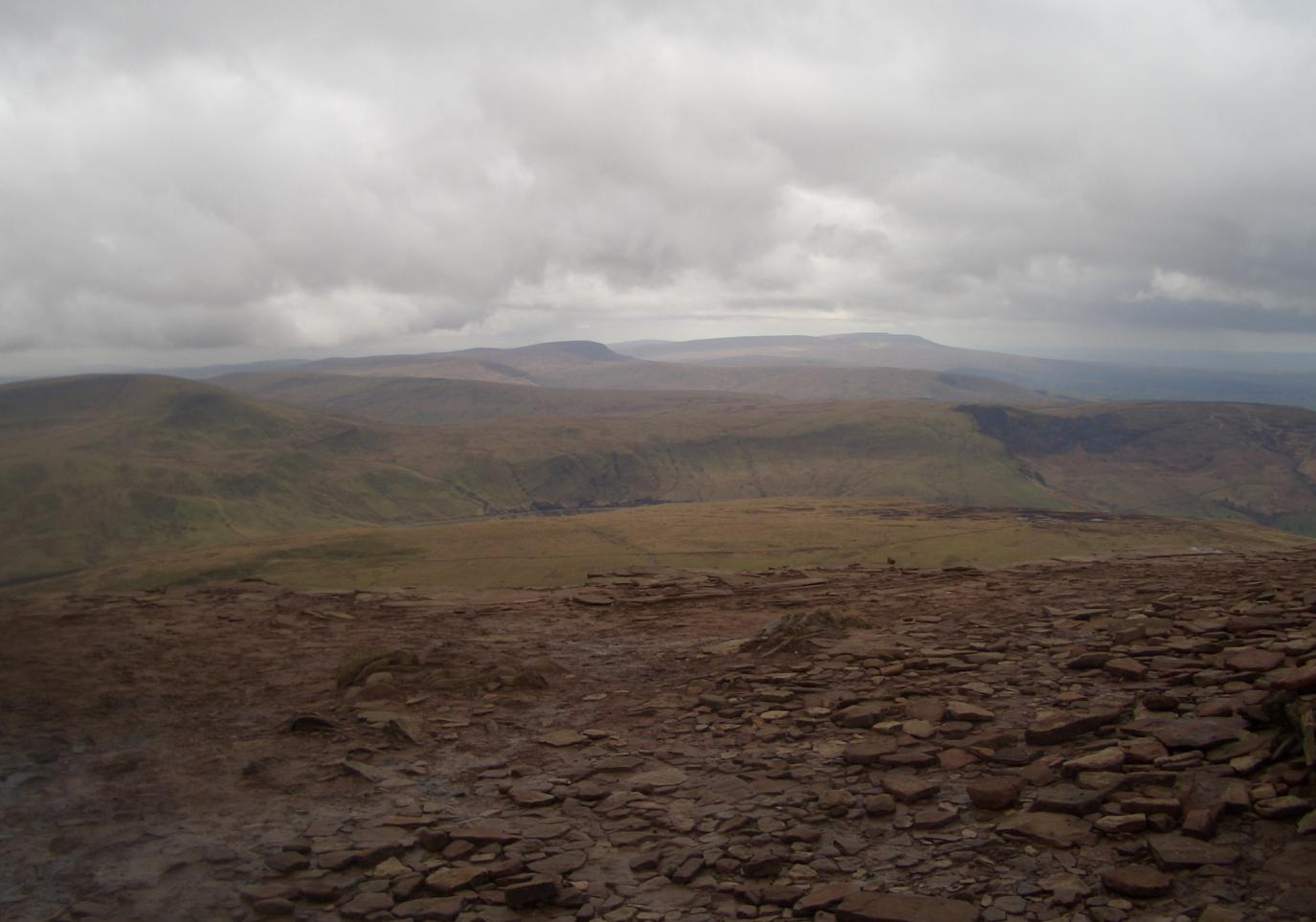
- Y Gyrn (bottom centre), Fan Fawr, Fan Gyhirych and Fan Brycheiniog from Corn Du

Highest point
- Elevation: 619 m (2,031 ft)
- Prominence: 24 m (79 ft)
- Parent peak: Pen y Fan
- Listing: sub Hewitt, Nuttall

Naming
- Language of name: Welsh

Geography
- Location: Powys, Wales
- Parent range: Brecon Beacons
- OS grid: SO012215
- Topo map: OS Landranger 160

Y Gyrn is a top of Pen y Fan in South Wales, situated in the Brecon Beacons National Park. Tommy Jones' Obelisk is found in between the summit and Corn Du.

The summit is a boggy mound overlooking the A470 and the Storey Arms. It is marked by a pile of stones.
