= Brecon Beacons National Park =

National park in Wales

Brecon Beacons National Park Bannau Brycheiniog National Park
- Parc Cenedlaethol Bannau Brycheiniog (Welsh)
- IUCN category V (protected landscape/seascape)
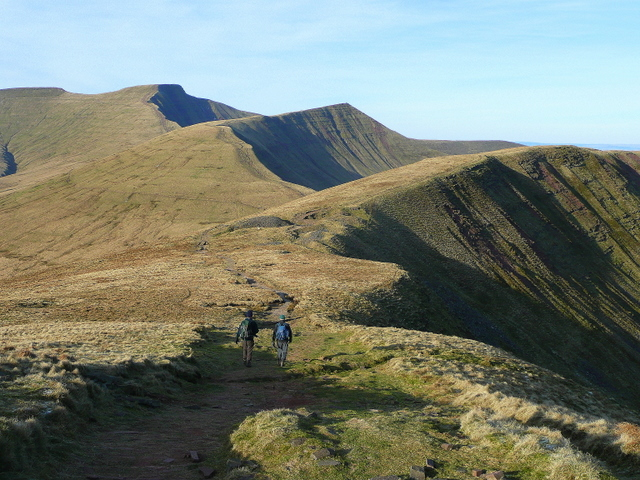
- Craig Cwm-Oergwm in Brecon Beacons National Park

- Location within Brecon Beacons
- Location: Wales
- Coordinates: 51°50′N 3°30′W
- Area: 1,344 km^{2} (519 sq mi)
- Established: 1957
- Website: beacons-npa.gov.uk

Brecon Beacons National Park, officially Bannau Brycheiniog National Park (Welsh pronunciation), is a national park in Wales. It is named after the Brecon Beacons, or Bannau Brycheiniog in Welsh, the mountain range at its centre. This range includes the highest mountain in South Wales, Pen y Fan, which has an elevation of 886 metres (2,907 ft).

The national park has a total area of 1,344 square kilometres (519 sq mi). The Brecon Beacons and Fforest Fawr uplands form the central section of the park. To the east are the Black Mountains, which extend beyond the national park boundary into England, and to the west is the similarly named but distinct Black Mountain range. These ranges share much of the same basic geology, the southerly dip of the rock strata leading to north-facing escarpments. The highest peak of the Black Mountains is Waun Fach (811 metres; 2,661 ft), and Fan Brycheiniog (802.5 metres; 2,633 ft) is the highest of the Black Mountain.

The park was founded in 1957 and is the third and most recently designated national park in Wales, after Snowdonia (Eryri) and the Pembrokeshire Coast. It is visited by approximately 4.4 million people each year.

== Toponymy ==
The name Bannau Brycheiniog is first attested in the sixteenth century, and "Brecon Beacons" first occurs in the eighteenth century as "Brecknock Beacons". Bannau Brycheiniog derives from the Welsh bannau, 'peaks', and Brycheiniog, the name of an early medieval kingdom which covered the area. The English name is derived from the Welsh one; in the eleventh century the town of Brecon is recorded as "Brecheniauc", which became "Brecknock" and "Brecon".

In a paragraph on Brecknockshire, John Leland's 1536–1539 Itinerary treats the ranges between Monmouth and Carmarthen as a single mountain named "Black Mountain". He goes on to ascribe the name "Banne Brekeniauc" to the hills surrounding "Artures Hille" (Pen-y-Fan), also calling the range the "Banne Hilles".

The term "Brecknock Beacons" was used in the eighteenth century and referred to the area around Pen y Fan, which was itself was sometimes called "the (Brecknock) Beacon". For instance, Emanuel Bowen's 1729 New and accurate map of South Wales labels the peak as "The Vann or Brecknock Beacon", John Clark's 1794 General View of the Agriculture of the County of Brecknock refers to "the Vann, or Brecknock Beacon, the undisputed sovereign of all the mountains in South Wales", and an 1839 tithe map of Cantref parish labels the mountain simply "Beacon". A slightly wider definition was used in 1809 by the Breconshire historian Theophilus Jones, who wrote that "of the lofty summits of the Brecknock Beacons, that most southwards is the lowest, and the other two nearly of a height, they are sometimes called Cader Arthur or Arthur's chair".

To distinguish the Brecons Beacons range from the national park, the range is sometimes called the "Central Beacons". In April 2023, the national park changed its name to "Bannau Brycheiniog" in English, abandoning the previous English name Brecon Beacons.

== Geography ==
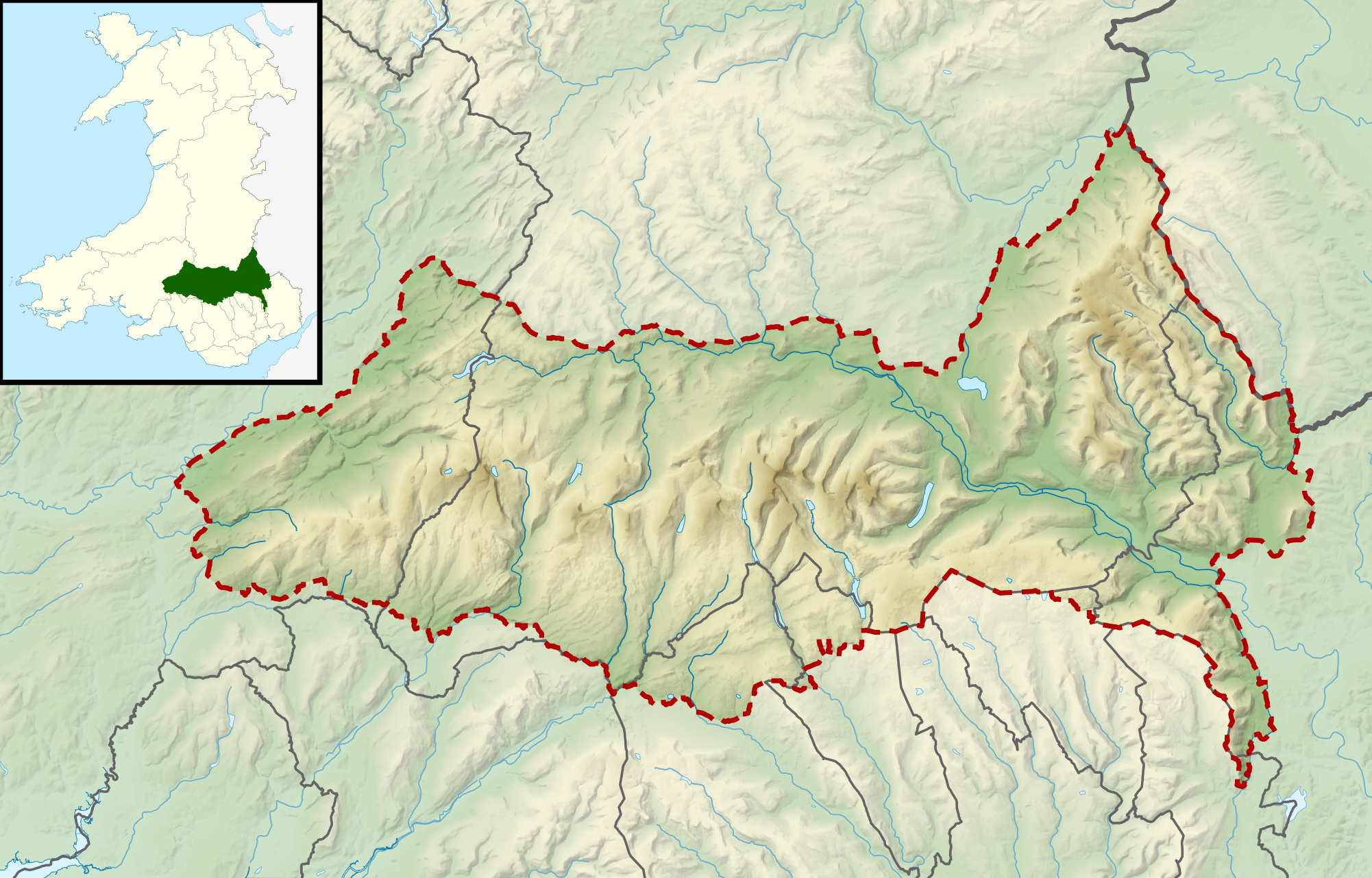
Relief map of the national park, with an inset on the location in Wales to the top-left.

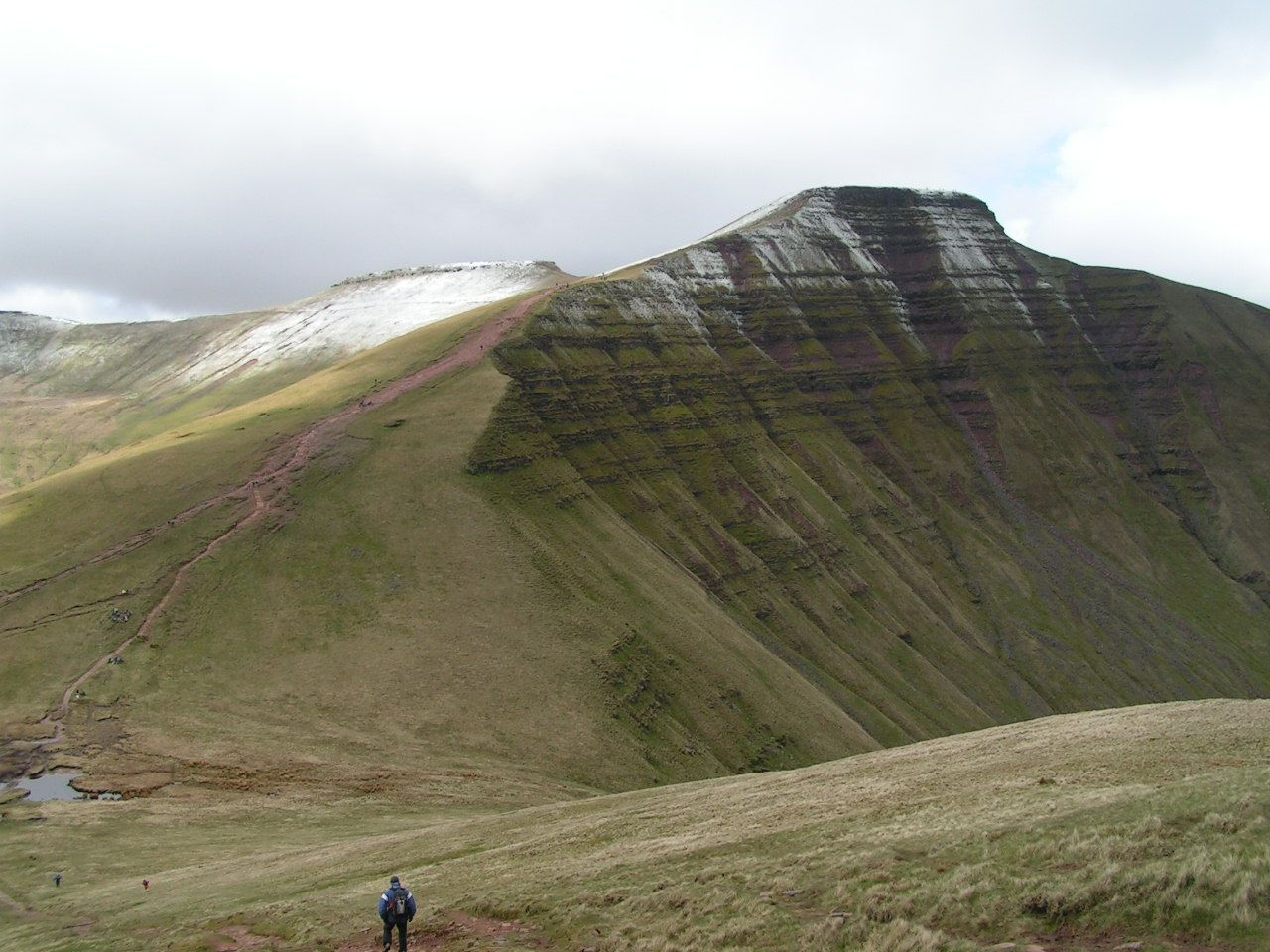
Pen y Fan seen from Cribyn

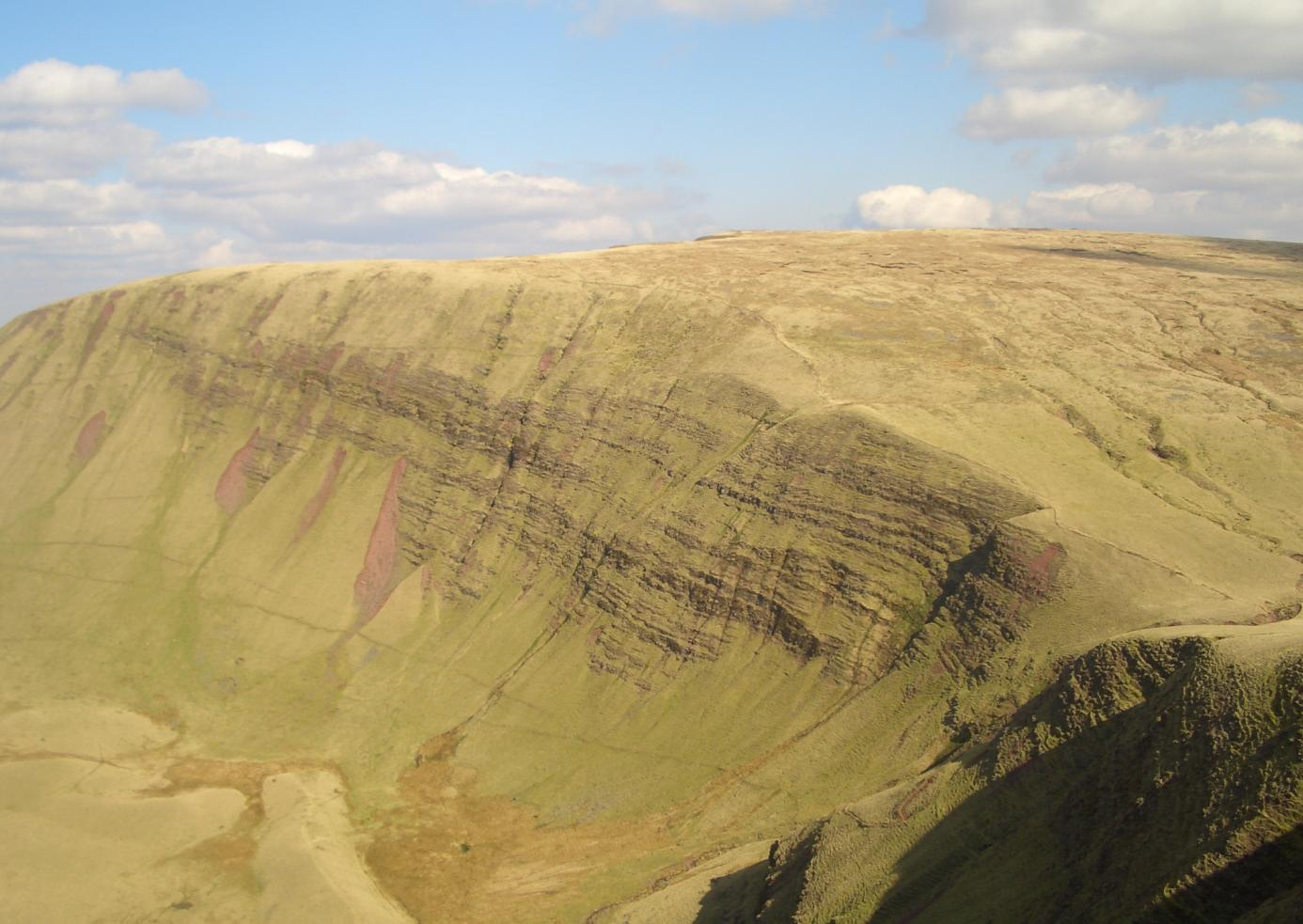
Fan Brycheiniog, the highest peak on the Black Mountain

The area covered by the national park stretches from Llandeilo in the west to Hay-on-Wye in the northeast and Pontypool in the southeast, covering 519 square miles (1,340 km^{2}). It principally consists of three mountain ranges; the Black Mountains in the east, the Brecon Beacons and Fforest Fawr uplands in the centre, and the Black Mountain in the west. The park is entirely within Wales and therefore excludes the Olchon Valley and Black Hill, which are part of the Black Mountains but in the English county of Herefordshire.

The central Brecon Beacons range comprises six main peaks, which from west to east are: Corn Du, 873 metres (2,864 ft); Pen y Fan, the highest peak, 886 metres (2,907 ft); Cribyn, 795 metres (2,608 ft); Fan y Bîg, 719 metres (2,359 ft); Bwlch y Ddwyallt, 754 metres (2,474 ft); and Waun Rydd, 769 metres (2,523 ft). These summits form a long ridge, and the sections joining the first four form a horseshoe shape around the head of the Taf Fechan, which flows away to the southeast. To the northeast of the ridge, interspersed with long parallel spurs, are four cirques (Welsh: cwm) or four round-headed valleys, which from west to east these are Cwm Sere, Cwm Cynwyn, Cwm Oergwm and Cwm Cwareli.

The Black Mountains in the east are clearly separated from the central Beacons range by the Usk valley between Brecon and Abergavenny. Waun Fach (811 metres; 2,661 ft) is the highest mountain in this range.

The Brecon Beacons range, Fforest Fawr, and Black Mountain form a continuous massif of high ground above 300 metres (980 ft). The A470 road forms the approximate boundary between the central Beacons and Fforest Fawr. The highest peak of the Black Mountain is Fan Brycheiniog, at 802.5 metres (2,633 ft). There are notable waterfalls in this area, including the 90-foot (27 m) Henrhyd Falls and the Ystradfellte falls to the south of Fforest Fawr. The Ogof Ffynnon Ddu cave system is on the southwestern edge of Fforest Fawr.

Numerous town and community councils operate within these areas and include the town councils for Brecon and Hay on Wye and the community councils for Cefn-coed-y-cymmer, Llanfihangel Cwmdu with Bwlch and Cathedine, Llangattock, Llangors, Llanthony, Llywel, Pontsticill, Pontsarn and Vaynor, Talybont-on-Usk, Trallong, Trecastle and Ystradfellte.

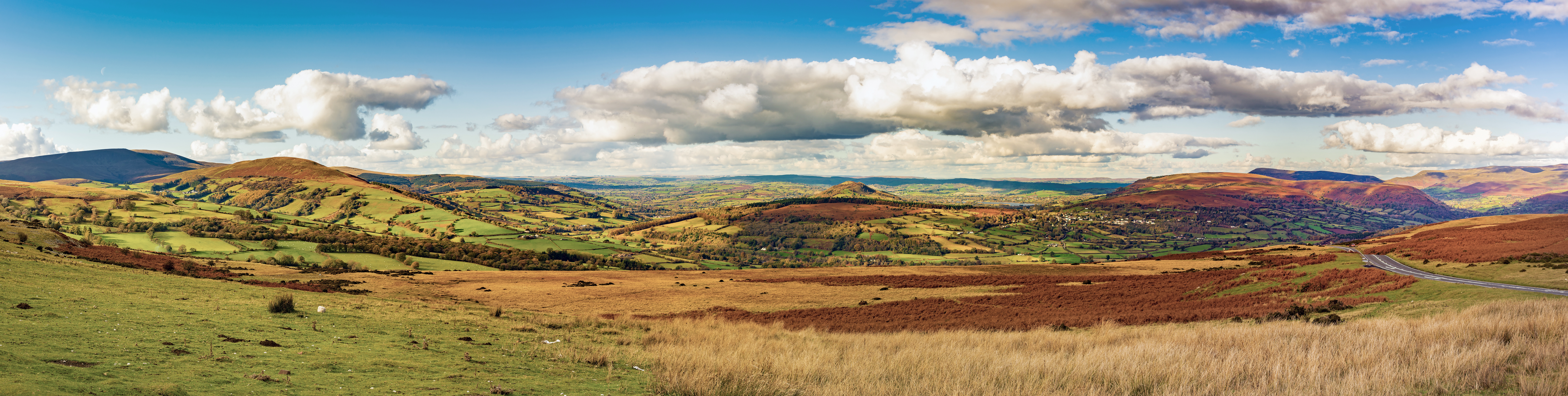
A view from beside the B4560 road south of Llangynidr. From left to right: the Brecon Beacons massif, Tor y Foel, Allt yr Esgair behind Buckland Hill (centre), Mynydd Troed behind Mynydd Llangorse with Myarth in the foreground, and the western part of the Black Mountains massif in the distance.

=== Geology ===
The geology of the national park consists of a thick succession of sedimentary rocks laid down from the late Ordovician through the Silurian and Devonian to the late Carboniferous period. The rock sequence most closely associated with the park is the Old Red Sandstone from which most of its mountains are formed. The older parts of the succession, in the northwest, were folded and faulted during the Caledonian orogeny. Further faulting and folding, particularly in the south of the park is associated with the Variscan orogeny.

== History ==
The area was inhabited during the Neolithic and the succeeding Bronze Age, the most obvious legacy of the latter being the numerous burial cairns which adorn the hills of the centre and west of the National Park. There are remnants of round barrows on Fan Brycheiniog, Pen y Fan and Corn Du. The former was excavated in 2002–4 and the ashes in the central cist dated to about 2000 BCE using radiocarbon dating. A wreath of meadowsweet was probably placed in the burial.

Over twenty hillforts were established in the area during the Iron Age. The largest, and indeed the largest in South Wales, were the pair of forts atop y Garn Goch near Bethlehem, Carmarthenshire – y Gaer Fawr and y Gaer Fach – literally "the big fort" and "the little fort". The forts are thought to have once been trading and political centres.

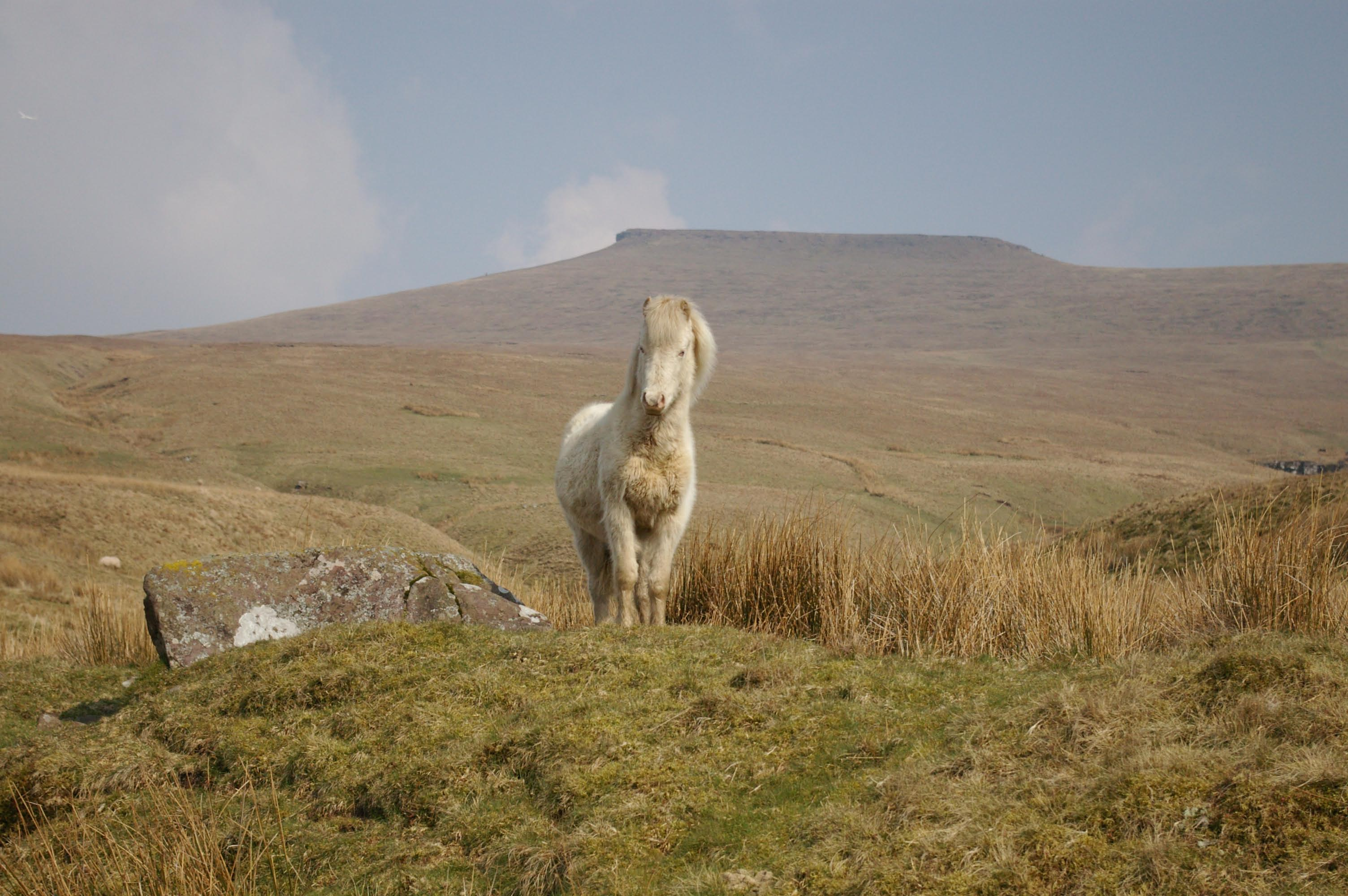
A Welsh Mountain Pony

When the Romans came to Wales in 43 CE, they stationed more than 600 soldiers in the area. Y Gaer, near the town of Brecon was their main base. During the Norman Conquest many castles were erected throughout the park, including Carreg Cennen Castle. Brecon Castle is of Norman origin.

There are many old tracks which were used over the centuries by drovers to take their cattle and geese to market in England. The drovers brought back gorse seed, which they sowed to provide food for their sheep.

The area played a significant role during the Industrial Revolution as various raw materials including limestone, silica sand and ironstone were quarried for transport southwards to the furnaces of the industrialising South Wales Valleys.

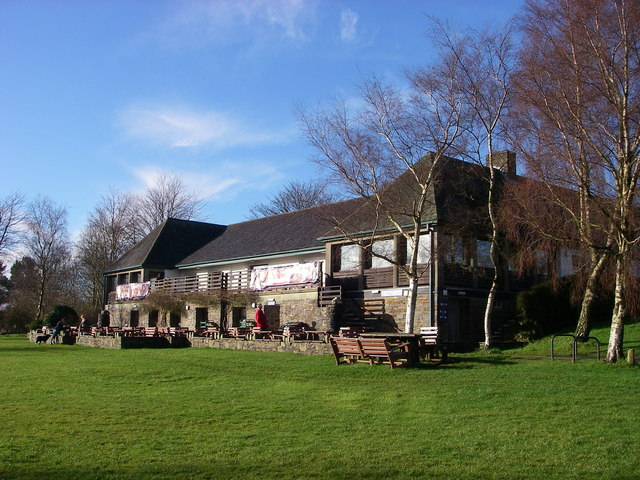
National Park Visitors Centre (Mountain Centre)

The Brecon Beacons Mountain Centre was opened in 1966 to help visitors understand and enjoy the area. This western half of the national park gained European and global status in 2005 as Fforest Fawr Geopark, which includes the Black Mountain, the historic extent of Fforest Fawr, and much of the Brecon Beacons range and surrounding lowlands. The entire national park achieved the status of being an International Dark Sky Reserve in February 2013.

In 2006 and 2007, controversy surrounded the government decision to build the South Wales Gas Pipeline through the park, the National Park Authority calling the decision a "huge blow".

=== Natural history ===
Most of the national park is bare, grassy moorland grazed by Welsh mountain ponies and Welsh mountain sheep, with scattered forestry plantations, and pasture in the valleys. Common ravens, red kites, peregrine falcons, northern wheatears, ring ouzels, and the rare merlin breeds in the park.

=== National park ===
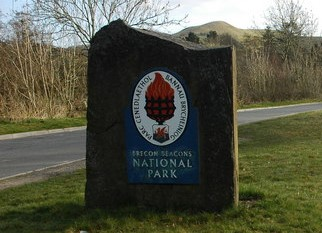
Brecon Beacons National Park sign

The Brecon Beacons National Park was established in 1957, the third of the three Welsh parks after Snowdonia in 1951 and the Pembrokeshire Coast National Park in 1952. It covers an area of 519 square miles (1,340 km^{2}), which is much larger than the Brecon Beacons range. Over half of the park is in the south of Powys; the remainder of the park is split between northwestern Monmouthshire, eastern Carmarthenshire, northern Rhondda Cynon Taf and Merthyr Tydfil, and very small areas of Blaenau Gwent, and Torfaen.

The Park as designated in 1957 covered a slightly smaller area than it does presently. A 'Variation Order' was made in June 1966 to extend it by about 4.5 square miles (12 km^{2}) at its southeastern extremity. West of the canal, the boundary had previously been drawn along the boundary between the (then) administrative parishes of Llanover and Goytre.

The park is managed by Bannau Brycheiniog National Park Authority, a special purpose local authority with responsibilities to conserve and enhance the natural beauty of the park, aid visitors' enjoyment of the park, and support the economic and social well-being of local communities. The National Park Authority has 18 members, twelve are appointed by the area's local authorities and six by the Welsh Government. Of the local authority members six are appointed by Powys County Council, and one each by the councils of Blaenau Gwent, Carmarthenshire, Merthyr Tydfil, Monmouthshire, Rhondda Cynon Taf, and Torfaen. There is also a standards committee with three members. Between 1995 and 2020 the park authority had 24 members, sixteen appointed by the local authorities and eight by the government.

== Activities ==
Outdoor activities in Brecon Beacons National Park include walking, cycling, mountain biking and horse riding, as well as sailing, windsurfing, canoeing, fishing, rock climbing, hang-gliding, caravanning, camping and caving. A long-distance cycling route, the Taff Trail, passes over the Beacons on its way from Brecon to Cardiff, and in 2005 the first walk to span the entire length of the park was opened. The 99-mile (159 km) route, called the Beacons Way, runs from Abergavenny via The Skirrid (Ysgyryd Fawr) in the east and ends in the village of Llangadog in Carmarthenshire in the west.

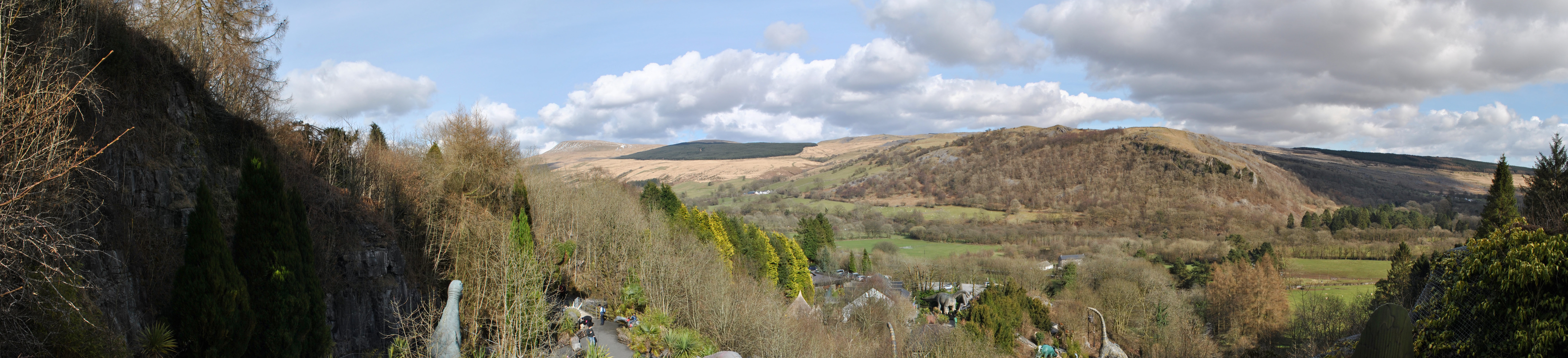
Panoramic view of Dan yr Ogof Showcaves grounds in Brecon Beacons National Park

== Brecon Mountain Railway ==
A railway with narrow gauge trains is run by the Brecon Mountain Railway. The railway is a 1 ft 11 3/4 in (603 mm) narrow gauge tourist railway on the south side of the Brecon Beacons. It climbs northwards from Pant along the full length of the Pontsticill Reservoir (also called 'Taf Fechan' reservoir by Welsh Water) and continues past the adjoining Pentwyn Reservoir to Torpantau railway station. The railway's starting point at Pant is located two miles (3 km) north of Merthyr Tydfil town centre.

== Mountain rescue ==
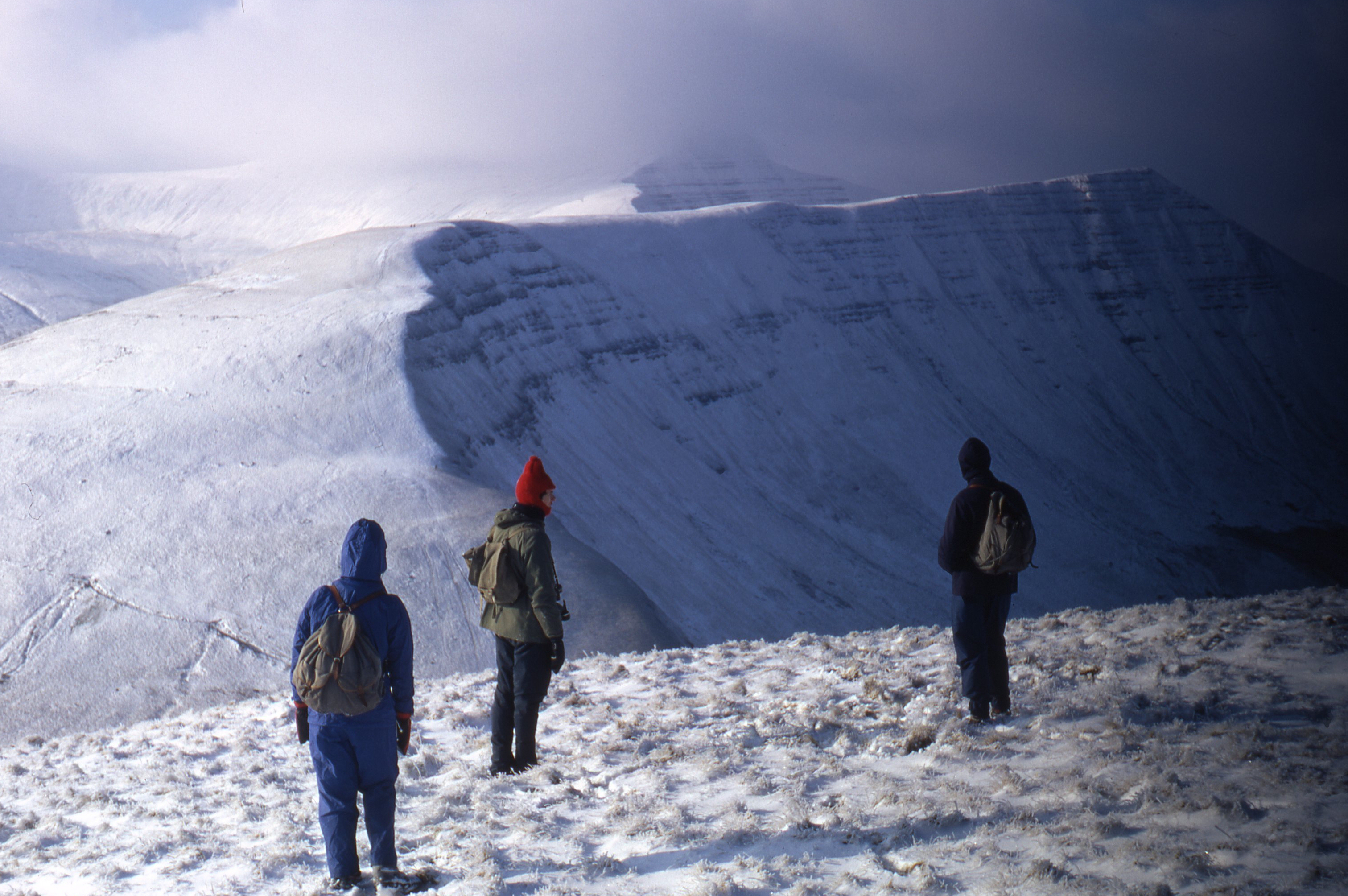
The Beacons in winter

Mountain rescue in south Wales is provided by five volunteer groups, with the police having overall command. In serious situations they were historically aided by Royal Navy or Royal Air Force helicopters from RM Chivenor or RAF Valley, but since 2015 this task has been performed by Bristow Helicopters on behalf of HM Coastguard. The five groups are:

- CBMRT – Central Beacons Mountain Rescue Team
- BMRT – Brecon Mountain Rescue Team
- LMRT – Longtown Mountain Rescue Team based in the east
- WBMSART – Western Beacons Mountain Search and Rescue Team
- SARDA South Wales – Search and Rescue Dog Association covering South and Mid Wales

The groups are funded primarily by donations. Their work is not restricted to mountain rescue – they frequently assist the police in their search for missing or vulnerable people in the community.

== Military training ==
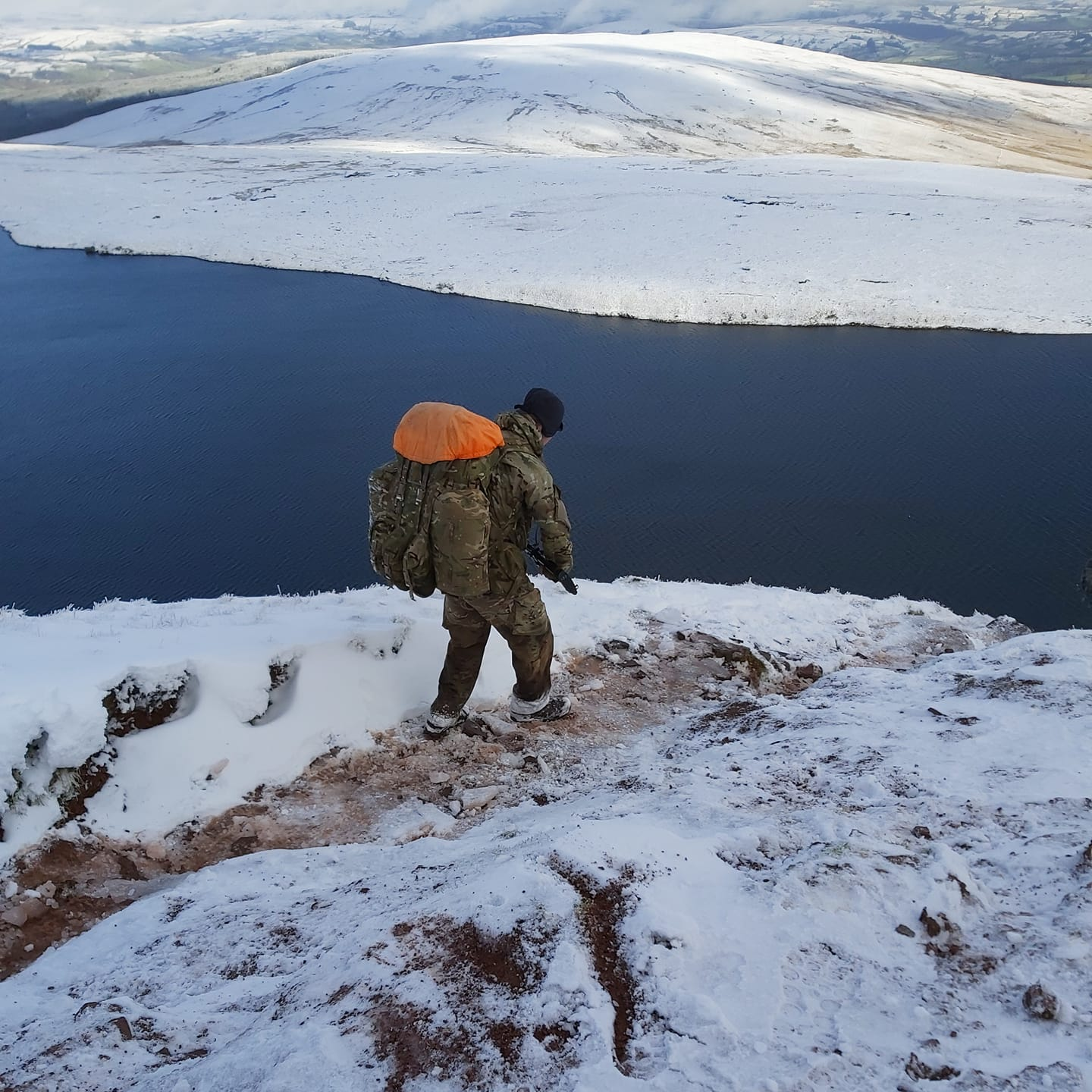
A soldier training in the Brecon Beacons above Llyn y Fan Fawr.

The Brecon Beacons are used for training members of the UK armed forces and military reservists. The Army’s Infantry Battle School is located at Brecon, and the Special Air Service (SAS) and Special Boat Service use the area to test the fitness of applicants. An exercise unique to the area is the 'Fan dance', which takes place on Pen y Fan. In July 2013 three soldiers died from overheating or heatstroke on an SAS selection exercise. An army captain had been found dead on Corn Du earlier in the year after training in freezing weather for the SAS.

== Use of Bannau Brycheiniog in English ==
On 17 April 2023 it was announced that the National Park had officially adopted the name Bannau Brycheiniog in both Welsh and English. The new official English name became Bannau Brycheiniog National Park, or "the Bannau" for short. The change took effect on the same day, the 66th anniversary of the park's designation.

The authority stated that the change was to promote the area's culture and heritage, as well as part of a wider overhaul of how the park is managed and to address environmental issues, such as climate change, and removing references to carbon-emitting beacons. The plan for the park to become net zero by 2035 and to address environmental concerns was supported by Welsh actor Michael Sheen. The change was described by a local as "pride" for Welsh-speakers, while others admitted both names would probably continue to be used. As part of the name change, the park also adopted a different logo, replacing its previous logo showing a lit beacon. Plaid Cymru's Welsh language spokesperson supported the move, while the Welsh Liberal Democrats welcomed the decision, with its leader Jane Dodds comparing it to movements in New Zealand. Conservative MP James Evans described the move as "not a priority" for locals and raised concerns over cost, and the local Conservative MP, Fay Jones, argued that the English name could have been kept. Upon the news of the name change the Prime Minister Rishi Sunak stated "I'm going to keep calling it the Brecon Beacons, and I would imagine most people will do that too."

Catherine Mealing-Jones, the park authority's CEO, stated: "the name Brecon Beacons doesn't make any sense – the translation Brecon Beacons doesn't really mean anything in Welsh", adding that "a massive carbon-burning brazier is not a good look for an environmental organisation". Mealing-Jones admitted that people can refer to the park by either name, and that the change "isn't compulsory", but hoped the emphasis on the Welsh name would encourage people to use the term. She stated: "We’d always had the name Bannau Brycheiniog as the Welsh translation and [...] we wanted to be celebrating Welsh people, Welsh culture, Welsh food, Welsh farming".

In May 2023 more than 50 local businesses in the national park campaigned for the "Brecon Beacons" name be restored alongside the Welsh name as a dual name. The campaigners say the decision did not respect Wales as a bilingual nation as it did not treat English and Welsh languages equally, and ambassadors of the park were not consulted on the name change. A digital marketer dismissed the campaigner's argument, stating tourism would not be impacted, and the national park authority stated they are prioritising Welsh names going forward.

In February 2026, the park authority announced it would be standardising the spelling of its Welsh-language place-names and would prioritise them over the English-language place-names, on signs, social media and in their literature.

== See also ==
- Fforest Fawr Geopark
- Geology of Brecon Beacons National Park
