= Mynydd Troed =

Hill (609m) in Powys, Wales

Coordinates: 51.9553°N 3.2155°W

Highest point
- Elevation: 609 m (1,998 ft)
- Prominence: 286 m (938 ft)
- Listing: Marilyn

Geography
- Location: Brecon Beacons
- OS grid: SO165292

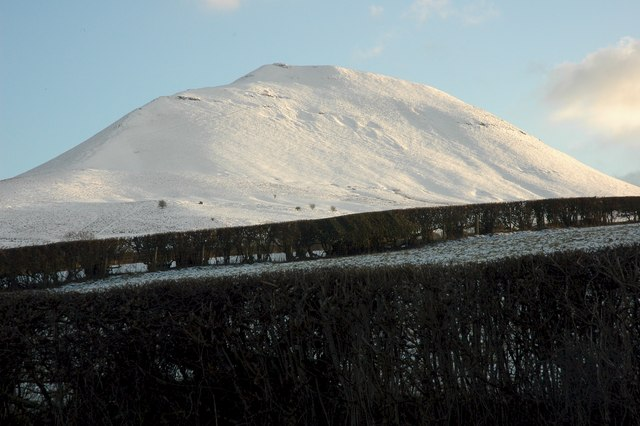
A snow-covered Mynydd Troed, viewed from the north

Mynydd Troed is a hill in the Black Mountains of the Brecon Beacons National Park in Powys, south Wales. Its name literally translates to "foot mountain," based how it appears when viewed from the Allt Mawr ridge.

It lies 3 miles (4.8 km) south of Talgarth and 2 miles (3.2 km) northeast of the village of Llangors on the western side of the range. Its summit at the northern end of a northwest to southeast aligned ridge reaches 609 metres (1,998 ft) above sea level and is crowned by a trig point.

== Geology ==
The base of the hill is formed from mudstones of the St Maughans Formation whilst the upper part is formed from the sandstones and mudstones of the Senni Beds Formation, both of which are assigned to the Old Red Sandstone laid down during the Devonian period. A few old landslides scar its slopes, a couple of which are seen to advantage from Castell Dinas and the ridge of Y Grib to the east. A number of small quarries have been worked on its slopes in the past.

== Access ==
Other than its lower slopes, the hill is designated as open country and therefore freely accessible to walkers. The most popular routes of ascent are from Pengenffordd on the A479 to the northeast and from the col over which the minor road up Cwm Sorgwm goes towards Llangors. A bridleway and a restricted byway run around the foot of the hill to the north and west. The hill is the 3,658th highest peak in the British Isles and the 220th tallest in Wales.
