= Craig Gwaun Taf =

Welsh mountain peak of the Brecon Beacons, Powys

- Duwynt
- Location within Brecon Beacons

Highest point
- Elevation: 826.4 m (2,711 ft)
- Prominence: 16.1 m (53 ft)
- Listing: Nuttall
- Coordinates: 51.87468°N 3.44504°W

Naming
- Language of name: Welsh

Geography
- Location: Powys, Wales
- Parent range: Brecon Beacons
- OS grid: SO012215
- Topo map: OS Landranger 160, Explorer OL12

Craig Gwaun Taf, also known as Duwynt, is a mountain in the Brecon Beacons with a height of 826.4 m (2,711 ft). It is within the wider Brecon Beacons National Park in Powys, Wales.

The mountain takes the form of a long ridge which runs north-west to south-east and falls away steeply to the north-east. The summit is at the north-west end of the ridge and marked by a small cairn; the ridge then turns north and drops into a very shallow col called Bwlch Duwynt before climbing to the adjacent peak of Corn Du.
