= Pen y Fan =

Welsh mountain peak of the Brecon Beacons, Powys

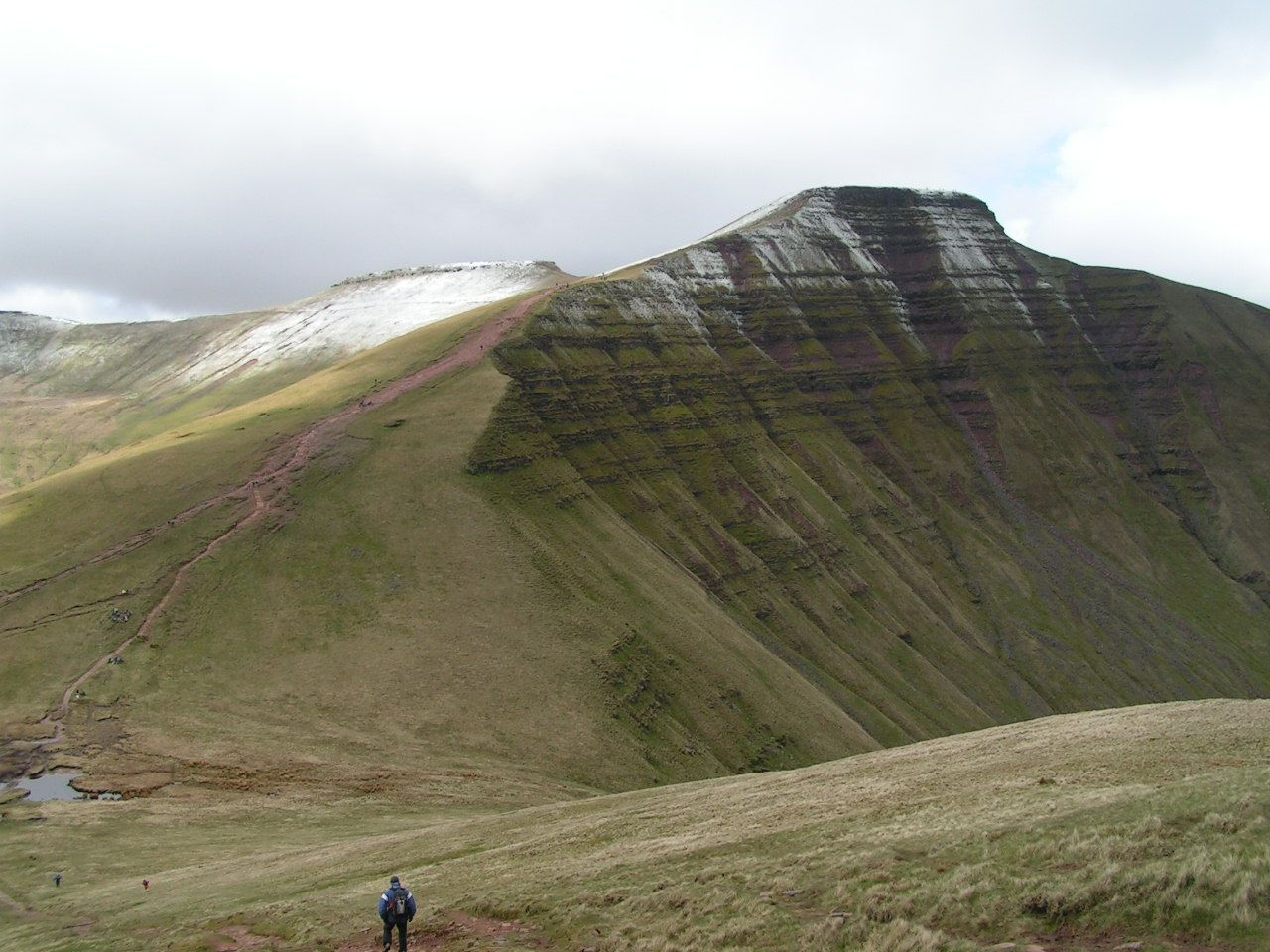
- Pen y Fan from Cribyn

Highest point
- Elevation: 886 m (2,907 ft)
- Prominence: 672 m (2,205 ft)
- Listing: Marilyn, Hewitt, Council top, Nuttall
- Coordinates: 51.88328°N 3.43684°W

Naming
- English translation: Top of the peak
- Language of name: Welsh
- Pronunciation: Welsh: [ˌpɛnəˈvan]

Geography
- Location within Brecon Beacons
- Location: Powys, Wales
- Parent range: Brecon Beacons
- OS grid: SO012215
- Topo map: OS Landranger 160, Explorer OL12

Pen y Fan (Welsh pronunciation: [ˌpɛn ə ˈvan]) is the highest peak in South Wales, situated in Brecon Beacons National Park (Bannau Brycheiniog). At 886 metres (2,907 ft) above sea-level, it is also the highest British peak south of Cadair Idris in Snowdonia. It is the highest point (county top) of the historic county of Brecknockshire (though in modern administrative terms, it now lies within the unitary council area of Powys). The twin summits of Pen y Fan and Corn Du at 871 metres (2,858 ft) were formerly referred to as Cadair Arthur or 'Arthur's Seat'.

The mountain and surrounding area are owned by the National Trust whose work parties attempt to combat the erosion caused by the popularity of this peak with walkers. The mountain is used by the military as part of the selection process of the UK's Special Forces personnel. Three soldiers who died after collapsing in the field in July 2013 were taking part in a test march called Point-to-Point while undergoing Special Air Service selection.

== Name ==
The name Pen y Fan consists of the Welsh words pen ('top, head, peak, summit', etc.), y ('the') and fan, a mutated form of ban ('summit, crest, peak, beacon, hill, mountain', etc.). 'The mountain's peak' or 'the top of the summit' are both possible translations. The noun ban, in its plural form bannau, is found in the Welsh name for the Brecon Beacons: Bannau Brycheiniog.

In earlier times, Pen y Fan itself was sometimes called the '(Brecknock) Beacon' and the early modern English cartographer, John Speed, designated it as Monuchdenny. In the General View of the Agriculture of the County of Brecknock (1794), John Clark of Builth (steward to Viscount Hereford) refers to 'the VANN, or Brecknock Beacon, the undisputed sovereign of all the mountains in South Wales'. On the tithe map for Cantref parish (1839), the peak of Pen y Fan is called 'Beacon'. This usage is no longer current.

== Walking ==
The peak is a major objective in the Beacons Way, a long distance footpath which passes from east to west across the massif, and is open to all walkers. There are well-made, evenly graded footpaths from the Storey Arms and Pont ar Daf on the A470, which is 460 metres (1,510 ft) below. This and other paths on the mountain are the subject of ongoing repair and maintenance by the National Trust to limit the erosion caused by the passage of hundreds of thousands of walkers each year. There is also a major path from Cribyn, a close-by peak to the east.

== Summit ==
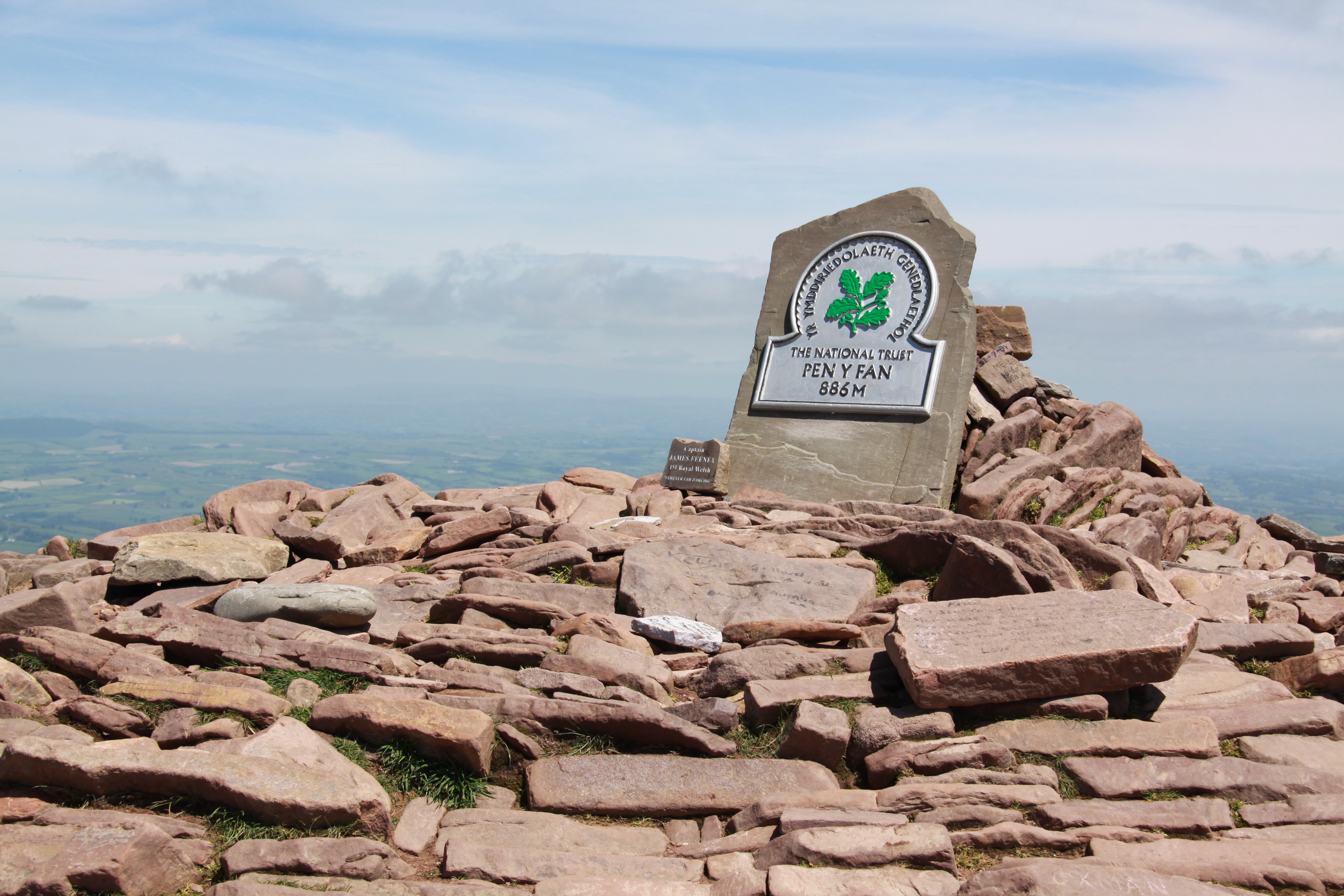
A National Trust plaque marking the summit

The summit is on an undulating ridge stretching from Talybont Reservoir in the east, to the A470. About 500 m (1/4 mi) southwest lies the subsidiary top of Corn Du, beyond which the terrain drops at a moderate angle to the subsidiary top of Y Gyrn, then more steeply to the Storey Arms on the A470. To the east, the ridge drops steeply to the col connecting it to Cribyn, the next mountain along the ridge. From Corn Du, a ridge with an east-facing escarpment descends gently south towards Merthyr Tydfil.

== Climate ==
Like much of upland Wales, Pen y Fan has a Subpolar Oceanic climate, with snowfall possible between November and May. The amount of snow and duration varies significantly from year to year. After a heavy snowfall, the mountain is a popular destination with local skiing enthusiasts.

== Archaeology ==
The summit is marked by a reconstructed Bronze Age cairn with a central stone cist, similar to that on the nearby summit of Corn Du. The grave is fitted with a series of concentric stone kerbs to protect the central mound from slippage. The cist is a box formed by vertical stone slabs near the centre of the barrow, and it is currently occupied by the National Trust sign, but will have originally held the ashes or other remnants of a dead person or persons since multiple burials together are common in the British Bronze Age. It also held grave goods left with the human remains, such as flint tools, cinerary urns, or flower tributes. The similar round barrow on Fan Foel was excavated in 2002–2004 and revealed such items in the central cist, the flowers being those of meadowsweet (Filipendula ulmaria).

Listed summits of Pen y Fan
Name	Grid ref	Height	Status
Corn Du	SJ066318	873 metres (2,864 ft)	sub Hewitt, Nuttall
Cribyn	SJ066318	795 metres (2,608 ft)	Hewitt, Nuttall
Y Gyrn	SJ066318	619 metres (2,031 ft)	sub Hewitt, Nuttall {{GB summits entry|Name=Craig Gwaun Taf|Height=826 metres (2,710 ft)|Gridref=

== Geology ==
Pen y Fan is formed from various units of the Old Red Sandstone which were laid down during the Devonian period. The lower slopes of the mountain are formed from the sandstones and mudstones of the Senni Formation whilst the upper slopes are formed from those of the Brownstones Formation. The very summit, like that of neighbouring Corn Du, is composed of hard-wearing sandstones of the Pen y Fan Formation (formerly known as the Plateau Beds). The beds of sandstone dip gently southwards towards the South Wales Coalfield basin.
The Brecon Beacons nurtured their own glaciers during the last ice age and both Cwm Llwch and Cwm Sere were excavated by glaciers which grew in the lee of the high ground. Llyn Cwm Llwch occupies a glacially excavated rock hollow and the lake is partly dammed by a late-glacial moraine. The mountain is the highest point within the Fforest Fawr Geopark which was established in 2005 to promote economic development, particularly sustainable tourism, based on the area's geological heritage.

== Tommy Jones' Obelisk ==
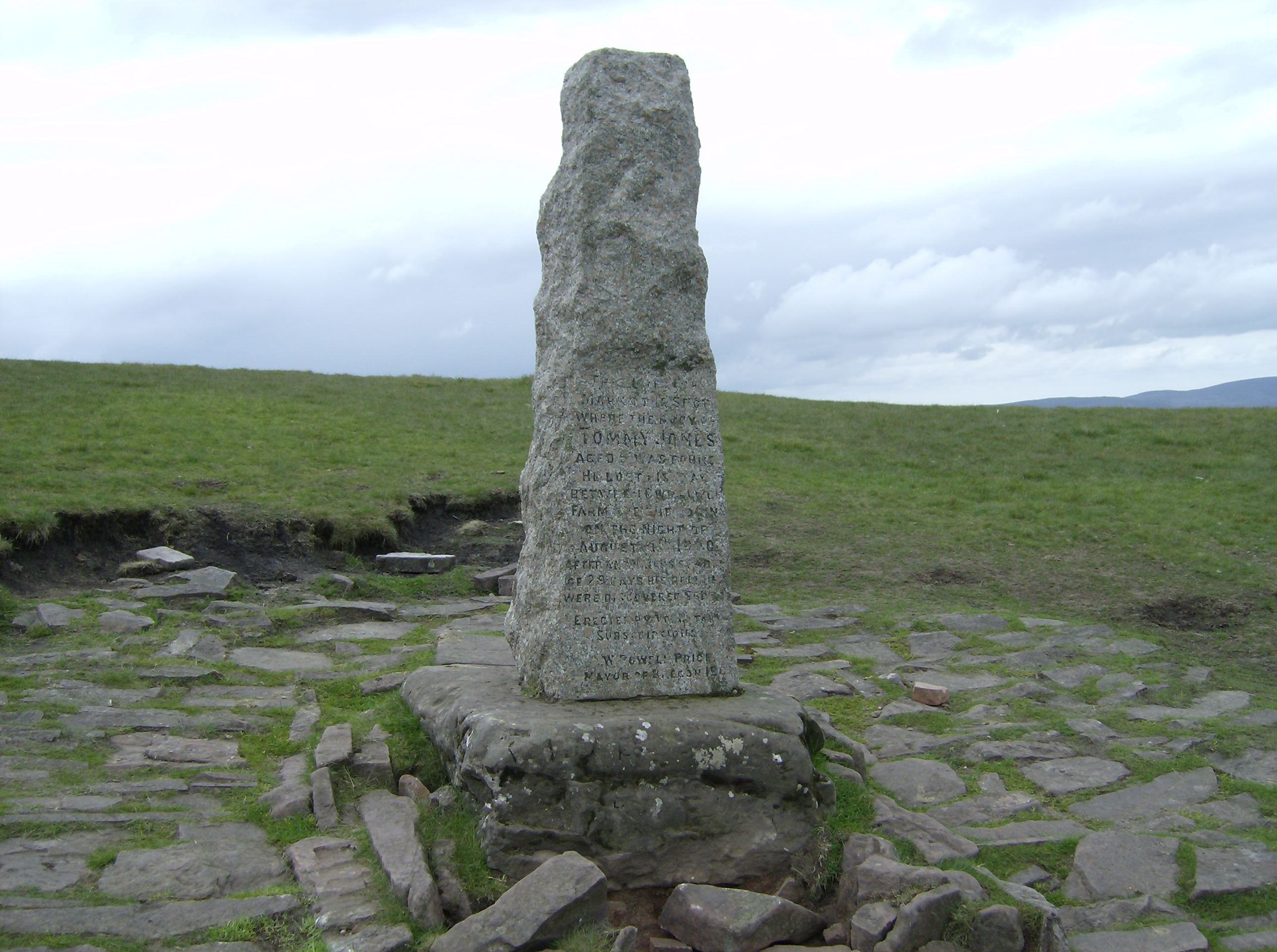
Tommy Jones Obelisk

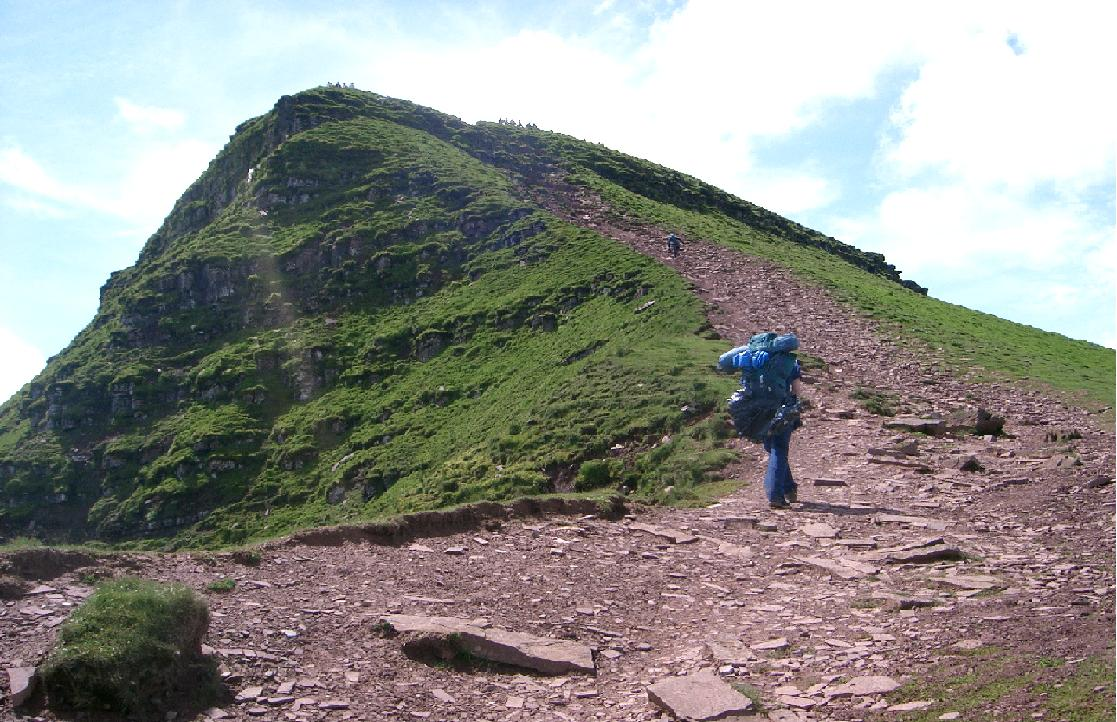
The summit

Above Cwm Llwch on the northwest spur of Corn Du is a memorial granite obelisk, with an inscription which reads: "This obelisk marks the spot where the body of Tommy Jones aged 5 was found. He lost his way between Cwm Llwch Farm and the Login on the night of August 4, 1900. After an anxious search of 29 days his remains were discovered Sept [2nd]. Erected by voluntary subscriptions. W Powell Price Mayor of Brecon 1901."

Tommy was the son of a Rhondda coal miner, and had been visiting his grandparents at the time. He died from exhaustion and hypothermia or exposure. How a small boy managed to climb so high remains a mystery.

The obelisk, a useful landmark in misty conditions, was paid for by the proceeds of a memorial fund started when the jurors at the boy’s inquest waived their fees.

The search was used as the theme of the 1980 film Tommy Jones.

== Panorama ==
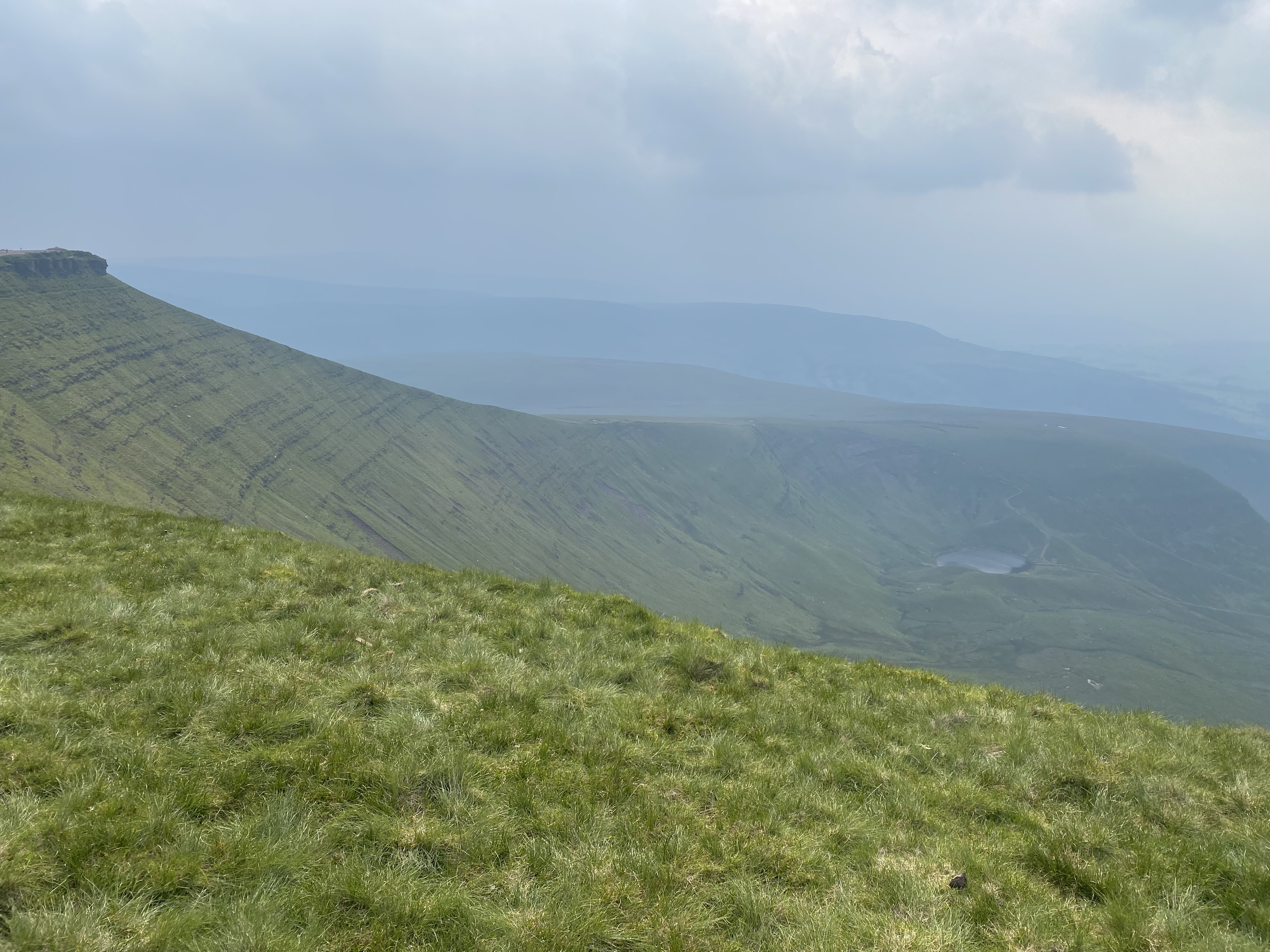
Llyn Cwm Llwch (lake) viewed from Pen Y Fan

From the summit on a clear day the Bristol Channel (including the islands of Flat Holm and Steep Holm), Carmarthen Bay, Swansea Bay, the Gower Peninsula, the Black Mountains, the Cambrian Mountains, Exmoor, the town of Brecon and much of Mid Wales and the South Wales Valleys, and in a north-easterly direction the Clee Hills in south Shropshire, can be seen.

== SOTA ==
The mountain has a Summits On The Air (SOTA) reference of GW/SW-001

== Storey Arms ==
The Storey Arms is an outdoor education centre beside the A470, the main trunk road between the north and south of Wales, in Brecon Beacons National Park near Libanus, Powys, Wales. Run by Cardiff City Council since 1971, the residential centre can accommodate up to 58 people. Its activities include kayaking and canoeing, caving, hill walking, rock climbing and white water rafting. The centre is at 440 metres (1,444 ft) above sea-level, along the pass between Pen y Fan and Fan Fawr, at the foot of Corn Du. It takes its name from a large coaching inn with a pitched slate roof (named after a local landowner, Storey Maskelyne), which was demolished in 1924. The site of the original inn is east of the centre, on the northeastern edge of the Pont ar Daf car park.

Buses stop on either side of the A470 outside the centre.

The car park at Pont ar Daf, 200 metres (656 ft) from the Storey Arms centre, is the most popular access point for tourists and walkers to Pen y Fan. The car park, which has space for around 200 cars following a recent expansion and upgrade, is owned by the Welsh Government and run by the National Trust, which now charges for parking. Composting toilet facilities are available at the site, which offers Wi-Fi.

A footpath connects the Storey Arms centre, bus stops and the Pont ar Daf car park to the path leading to Corn Du and Pen y Fan.

== See also ==
- Beacons Way
