= Senni Beds =

Geologic formation in Wales

- Stratigraphic range: Devonian
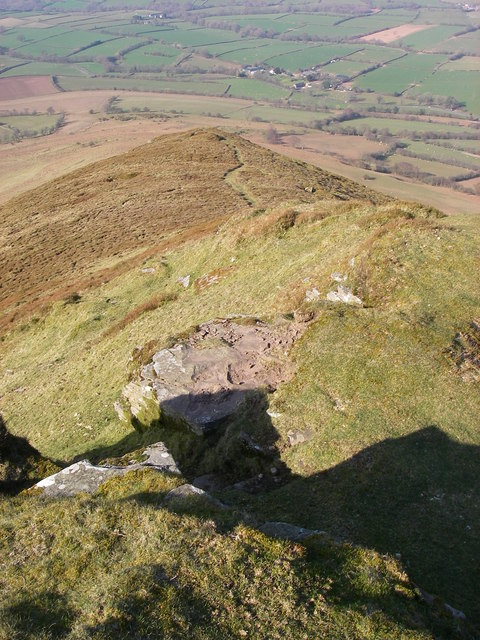
- Mynydd Troed, the upper part of the hill consisting of the Senni Beds Formation
- Type: Formation
- Unit of: Old Red Sandstone

Lithology
- Primary: Mudstone
- Other: Sandstone

Location
- Region: Wales
- Country: United Kingdom

The Senni Beds is the former name of the Senni Formation in Wales. It preserves fossils dating back to the Devonian period.

== See also ==
- List of fossiliferous stratigraphic units in Wales
