= Bwlch y Ddwyallt =

Hill (754m) in Powys, Wales

- Gwaun Cerrig Llwydion
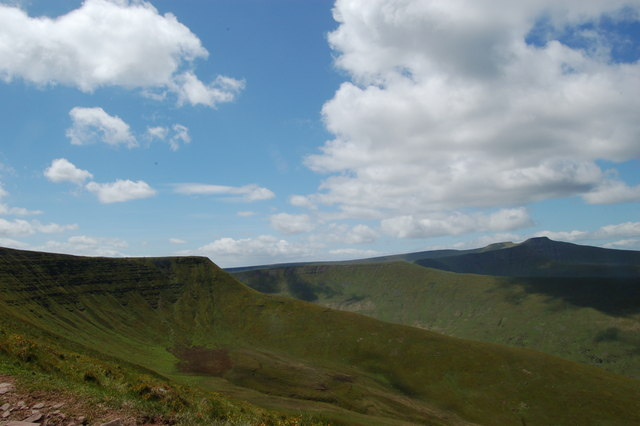

Highest point
- Elevation: 754 m (2,474 ft)
- Prominence: 18 m (59 ft)
- Parent peak: Waun Rydd
- Listing: Nuttall
- Coordinates: 51.8739°N 3.3737°W

Naming
- English translation: pass of the two wooded hillsides bog of the grey rocks (for Gwaun Cerrig Llwydion)
- Language of name: Welsh

Geography
- Location: Powys, Wales
- Parent range: Brecon Beacons
- OS grid: SO012215
- Topo map: OS Landranger 160

Bwlch y Ddwyallt (Welsh pronunciation: [bʊlχ ə ˈðʊi̯aɬt]) is the name commonly applied to the high point of the plateau of Gwaun Cerrig Llwydion in the eastern part of the Brecon Beacons in south Wales. It is a top of Waun Rydd.

The plateau reaches its highest point of 754 m (2,474 ft) above sea level on its northern rim overlooking the head of Cwm Cwareli. The name is an odd one to apply to a peak since the Welsh word 'bwlch' generally signifies a col or pass between mountains.

== Geology ==
The plateau is formed from the hard-wearing sandstones of the Plateau Beds Formation of the Old Red Sandstone laid down during the Devonian period. These beds directly overlie the sandstones of the Brownstones Formation, also of Devonian age, which form the bulk of the hill. The cliffs below Bwlch y Ddwyallt shows signs of having been glaciated during the ice ages as do those beneath Graig Fan Las on the eastern edge of the plateau.

== Access ==
The entire area is classed as open country. The Beacons Way runs along the southern edge of the plateau. Other footpaths skirt the remaining rims of the plateau and connect with neighbouring peaks.
