= Fan Dance (exercise) =

Training exercise for UK special forces

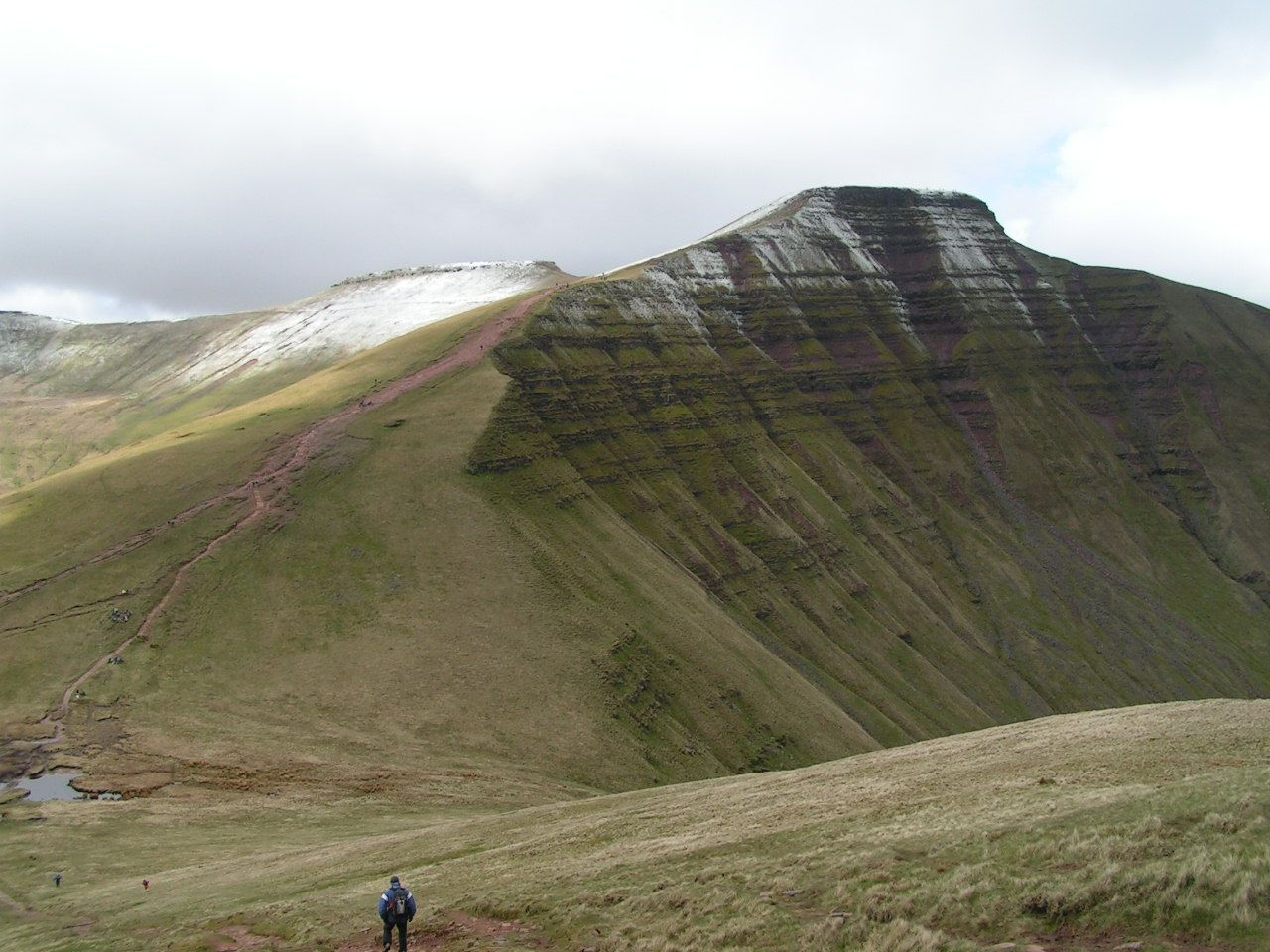
Pen y Fan 2,907 feet (886 m) above sea-level. The location for the Fan Dance.

The Fan Dance (a.k.a. Exercise High Walk) is part of the Fitness and Navigation phase of the selection process for the United Kingdom's Special Forces, as well as 16 Air Assault Brigade's Pathfinder Platoon and as part of Platoon Commanders' Battle Course (PCBC) for all British Infantry Officers.

The Fan Dance is a 15-mile (24 km) load bearing march that takes place at the end of the first week of the selection course. It is used as the first major indicator of whether a candidate has the physical and mental aptitude to complete the selection.

The candidates climb Pen y Fan's west slope (facing Corn Du) and then descend on the far side, known as Jacob's Ladder. The rest of the route follows the old Roman road before going back on itself for the return leg. Candidates are allowed 4 hours and 10 minutes to complete the route regardless of weather.

The Fan Dance is a DS (Directing Staff) led group march, the route of the DS must be followed, but it is essentially down to the individual's own effort to complete so long as they come in under the allotted time.
