= Brecon Beacons =

Mountain range in Wales

- Bannau Brycheiniog (Welsh)
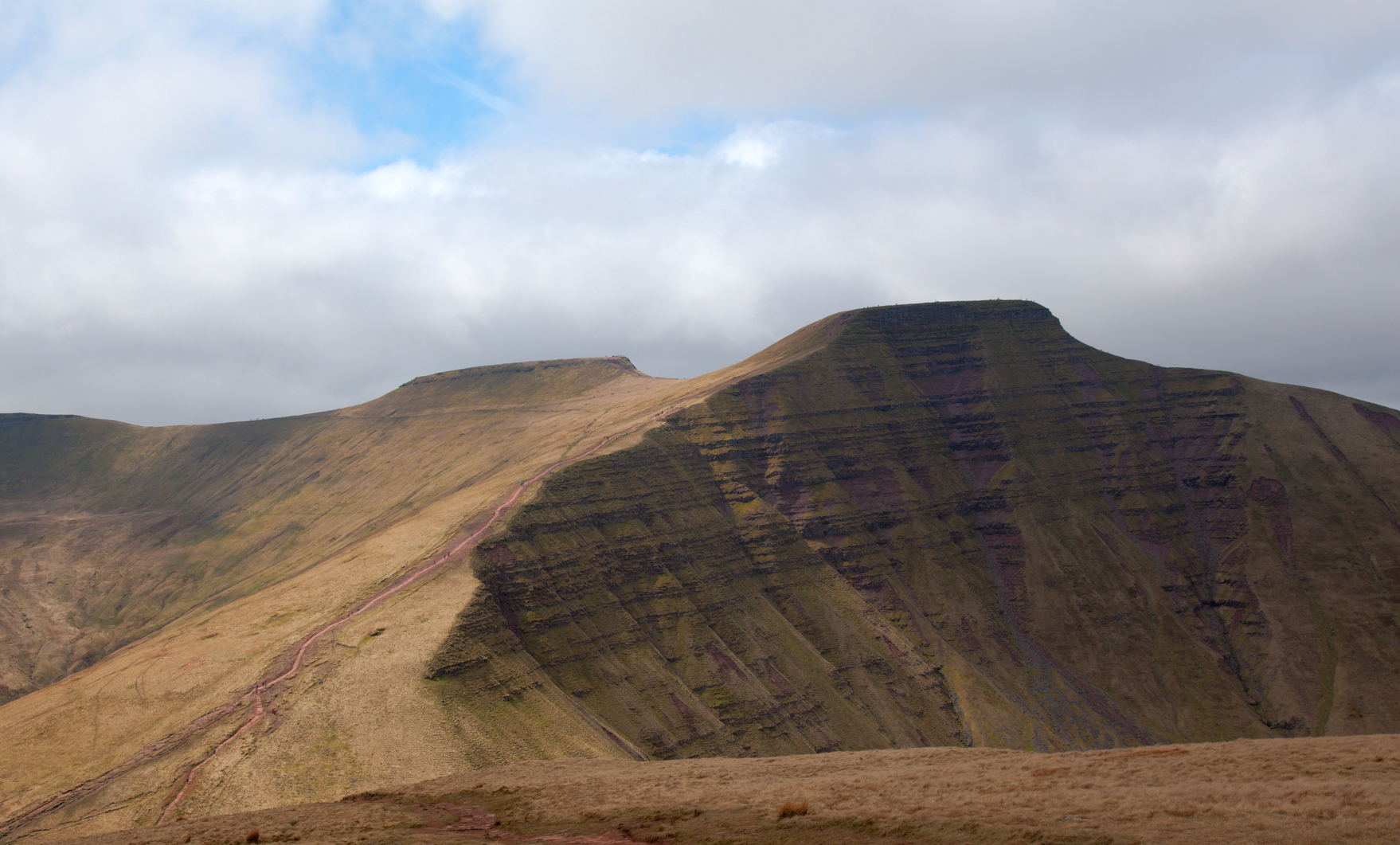
- Part of the Brecon Beacons range, looking from Cribyn to Pen y Fan and Corn Du

Highest point
- Peak: Pen y Fan
- Elevation: 886 m (2,907 ft)
- Coordinates: 51.88328°N 3.43684°W

Geography
- Location: Powys
- Countries: Wales, United Kingdom

Geology
- Rock age: Devonian
- Rock type: Sedimentary

The Brecon Beacons (Welsh: Bannau Brycheiniog; [ˈbanai̯ brəˈχei̯njɔɡ]) are a mountain range in Wales. The range includes South Wales's highest mountain, Pen y Fan (886 metres (2,907 ft)), its twin summit Corn Du (873 metres (2,864 ft)), and Craig Gwaun Taf (826 metres (2,710 ft)), which are the three highest peaks in the range. The Brecon Beacons have given their name to the larger Brecon Beacons National Park, and the range itself is therefore sometimes known as the Central Beacons to differentiate the two.

== Toponymy ==
Bannau Brycheiniog derives from the Welsh bannau, "peaks" and Brycheiniog, the early medieval kingdom which covered the area. The English name is derived from the Welsh. This name is first attested in the sixteenth century in John Leland's 1536–1539 Itinerary of Wales. Under his description of the Brecknockshire landscape Leland states :

"Artures Hille is three good Welsh (almost five English) miles south west from Brekenok, and on the very top of the hill is a fair wellspring. This hill of some is counted the highest hill of Wales, and in a very clear day a man may see from it a part of Malvern Hilles, and Glocestre, and Bristow, and part of Devenshir and Cornwale. There be other diverse hills by Artures Hille, that which, with it, be communally called Banne Brekeniauc."

The name Brecon Beacons first occurs in the eighteenth century (as "Brecknock Beacons") and referred to the area around Pen y Fan (which itself was sometimes referred to as "the Brecknock Beacon"). For instance, Emanuel Bowen's A New and accurate map of South Wales (1729) labels the peak as 'The Vann or Brecknock Beacon', John Clark's 1794 General View of the Agriculture of the County of Brecknock refers to 'the Vann, or Brecknock Beacon, the undisputed sovereign of all the mountains in South Wales', and an 1839 tithe map of Cantref parish labels the mountain simply 'Beacon'. A slightly wider definition was used in 1809 by the Brecknockshire historian Theophilus Jones, who wrote that 'of the lofty summits of the Brecknock Beacons, that most southwards is the lowest, and the other two nearly of a height, they are sometimes called Cader Arthur or Arthur's chair'. This implies that "Brecknock Beacons" referred to only three summits, including Pen y Fan and Corn Du.

To distinguish the Brecons Beacons range from the national park, the range is sometimes called the "Central Beacons".

== Geography ==
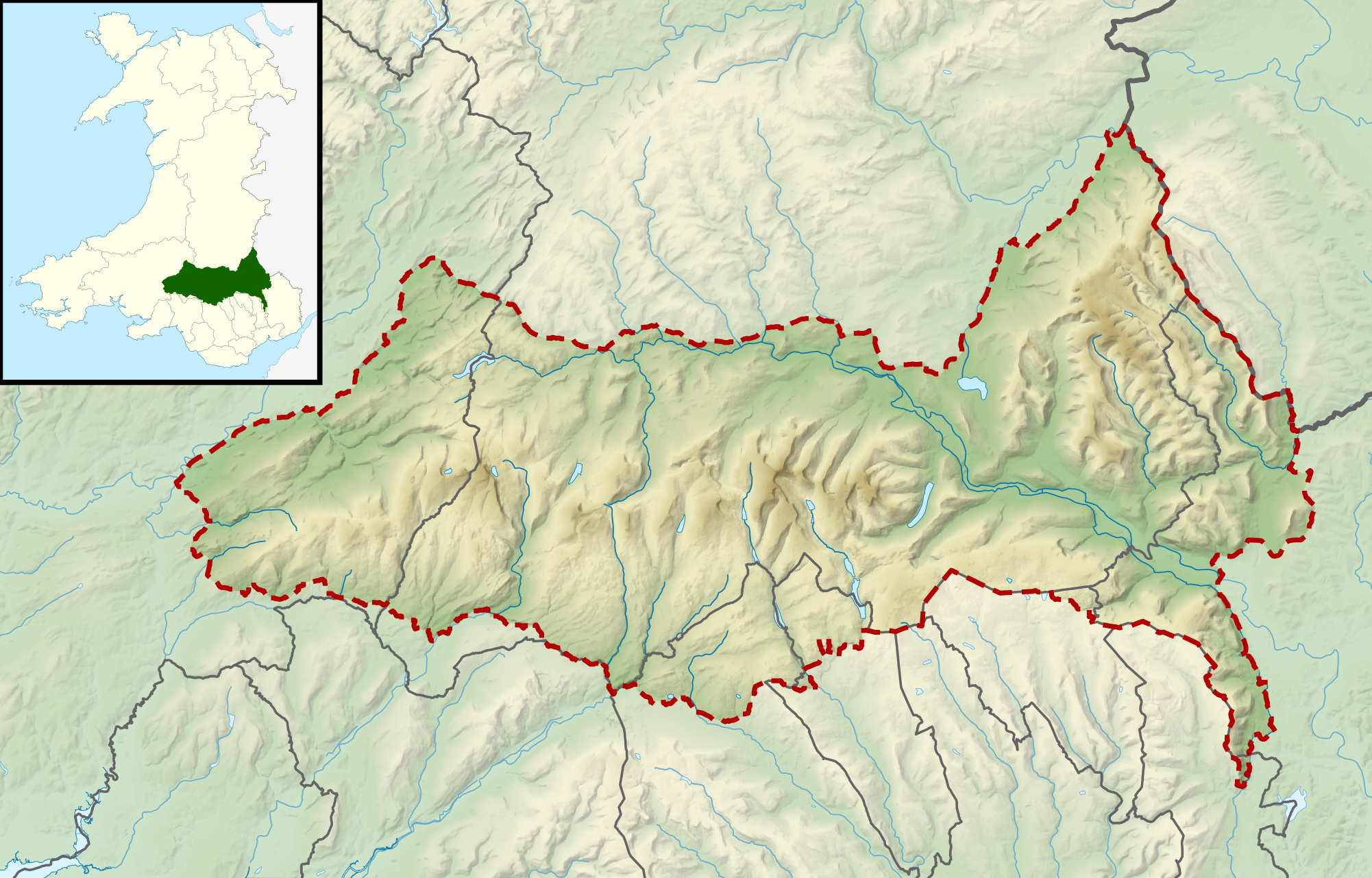
Relief map of the Brecon Beacons National Park (bordered), with the Brecon Beacons located in the central area of the national park.

The Brecon Beacons comprises six main peaks, which from west to east are: Corn Du, 873 metres (2,864 ft); Pen y Fan, the highest peak, 886 metres (2,907 ft); Cribyn, 795 metres (2,608 ft); Fan y Big, 719 metres (2,359 ft); Bwlch y Ddwyallt, 754 metres (2,474 ft); and Waun Rydd, 769 metres (2,523 ft). These summits form a long ridge, and the sections joining the first four form a horseshoe shape around the head of the Taf Fechan, which flows away to the southeast. To the northeast of the ridge, interspersed with long parallel spurs, are four cirques (Welsh: cymoedd, sing. cwm) or round-headed valleys; from west to east these are Cwm Sere, Cwm Cynwyn, Cwm Oergwm and Cwm Cwareli.

The Brecon Beacons range, Fforest Fawr, and Black Mountain form a continuous massif of high ground above 300 metres (1000 feet). The A470 road forms an approximate boundary between the central Beacons and Fforest Fawr.

== National park ==
The Brecon Beacons National Park was established in 1957, the third of the three Welsh parks after Snowdonia in 1951 and the Pembrokeshire Coast National Park in 1952. It covers an area of 519 square miles (1,340 km^{2}), which is much larger than the Brecon Beacons range. Over half of the park is in the south of Powys; the remainder of the park is split between northwestern Monmouthshire, eastern Carmarthenshire, northern Rhondda Cynon Taf and Merthyr Tydfil, and very small areas of Blaenau Gwent, and Torfaen.

== Brecon Mountain Railway ==
A railway with narrow gauge trains is run by the Brecon Mountain Railway. The railway is a 1 ft 11 3/4 in (603 mm) narrow-gauge tourist railway on the south side of the Brecon Beacons range. It climbs northwards from Pant along the full length of the Pontsticill Reservoir (also called 'Taf Fechan' reservoir by Welsh Water) and continues past the adjoining Pentwyn Reservoir to Torpantau railway station. The railway's starting point at Pant is located two miles (3 km) north of Merthyr Tydfil town centre.

== Military training ==
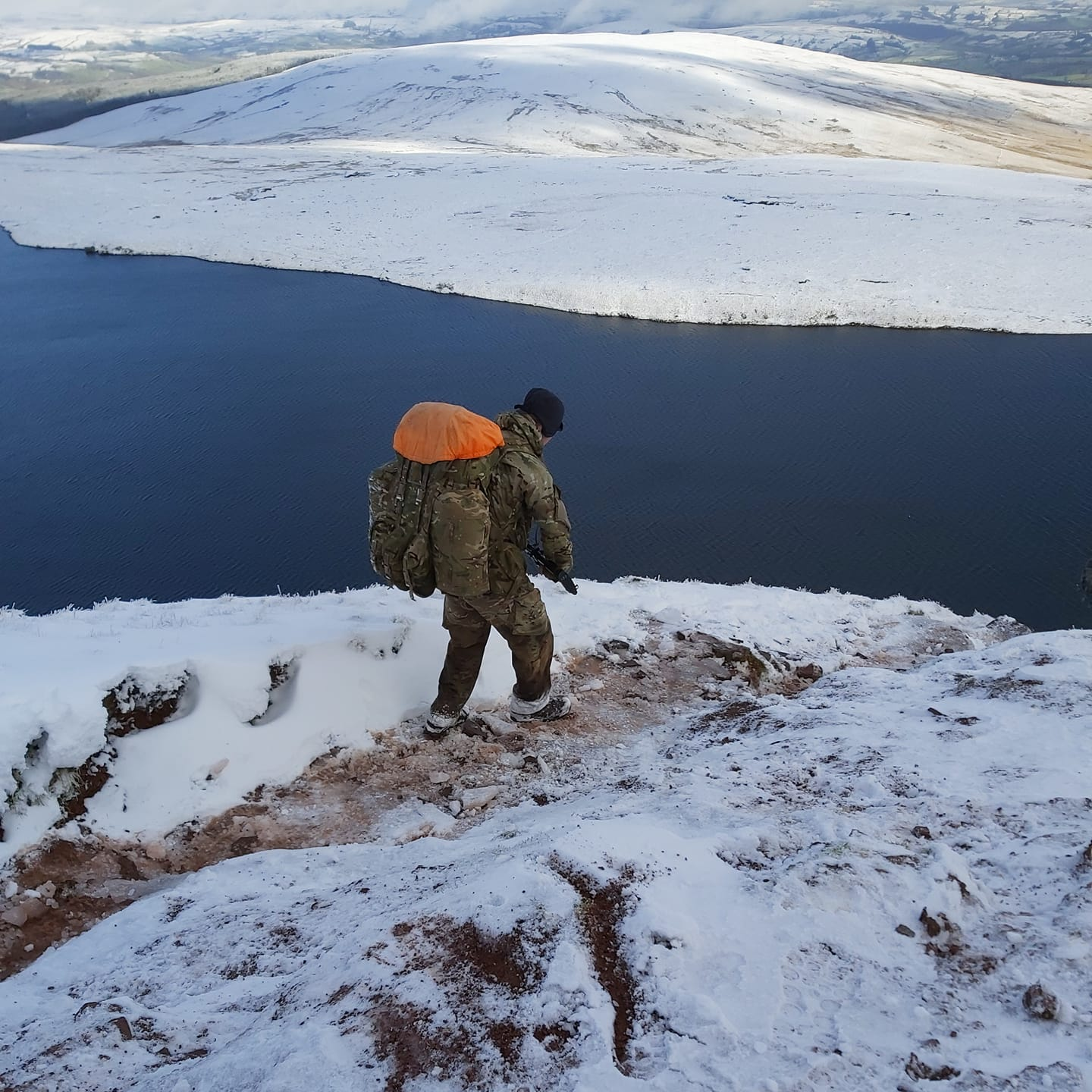
A soldier training in the Brecon Beacons above Llyn y Fan Fawr.

The Brecon Beacons are used for training members of the UK armed forces and military reservists. The Army's Infantry Battle School is located at Brecon, and the Special Air Service (SAS) and Special Boat Service use the area to test the fitness of applicants. An exercise unique to the area is the 'Fan dance', which takes place on Pen y Fan. In July 2013 three soldiers died from overheating or heatstroke on an SAS selection exercise. An army captain had been found dead on Corn Du earlier in the year after training in freezing weather for the SAS.

== See also ==
- Brecon Mountain Railway
- Brecon Beacons Food Festival
