= Corn Du =

Welsh mountain peak; part of Pen y Fan

Coordinates: 51.88328°N 3.43684°W

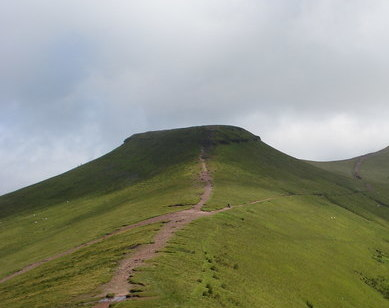
- The summit of Corn Du

Highest point
- Elevation: 871.5 m (2,859 ft)
- Prominence: 28.2 m (93 ft)
- Parent peak: Pen y Fan
- Listing: Nuttall

Naming
- English translation: black horn
- Language of name: Welsh

Geography
- Location: Powys, Wales
- Parent range: Brecon Beacons
- OS grid: SO012215
- Topo map: OS Landranger 160

Corn Du (Welsh pronunciation: [kɔrn ˈdiː]) is a summit of the twin topped Pen y Fan and the second highest peak in South Wales at 871.5 m (2,864 ft), situated in the Brecon Beacons National Park. It is situated to the south-west of Pen y Fan at a distance of approximately 550 m from it, and is just 13 m (43 ft) lower than Pen y Fan itself. The summit is marked by a well structured Bronze Age cairn with a central burial cist like that on nearby Pen y Fan. The two summits are visible from great distances owing to their height above the surrounding moorland, and are famous landmarks. The views from the peaks are also panoramic and very extensive, the Black Mountain and Fforest Fawr being especially obvious to the west. Mynydd Epynt is visible to the north behind the county town of Brecon, and other parts of the escarpment to the east.

== Access ==
The summit is often crossed on the way to Pen y Fan, and forms part of a well-known circuit of the Beacons. It offers good views down into Cwm Llwch and across the Usk valley to Brecon as well as east towards the Sugar Loaf, Monmouthshire above Abergavenny. Tommy Jones' Obelisk is found on its western flanks, in between the summit and Y Gyrn. All of the surrounding moorland is open to access, but crossing some parts of the terrain such as peat bogs is more difficult and the main paths are well engineered and maintained by the National Trust.

== Geology ==
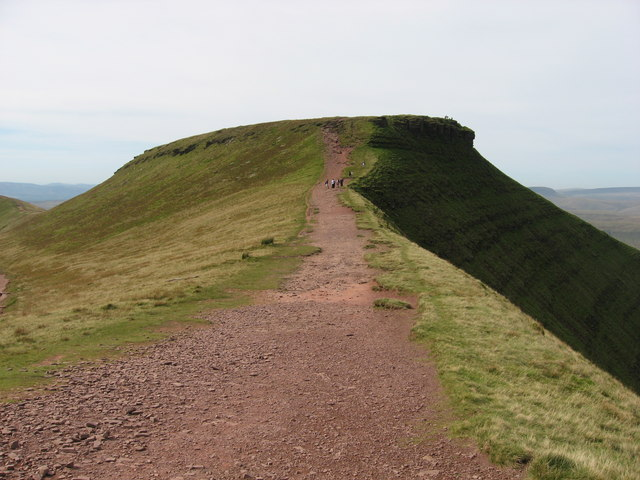
Corn Du showing distinctive strata

The summit is very similar to that of Pen y Fan: flat and anvil-shaped. It is similarly formed from the relatively erosion-resistant Devonian age sandstones from the Upper Old Red Sandstone known as the Plateau Beds. The rock strata are clearly visible at the edge of the escarpment, where they form a resistant edge to the cliff. The same strata are visible all along the escarpment facing north, as well as the rearward edge facing south-east and lying behind the main peaks. The same Plateau Beds recur in the Black Mountain (range) to the west, and cap the summits of Picws Du and Fan Foel, as well as forming steep cliffs below the peaks.

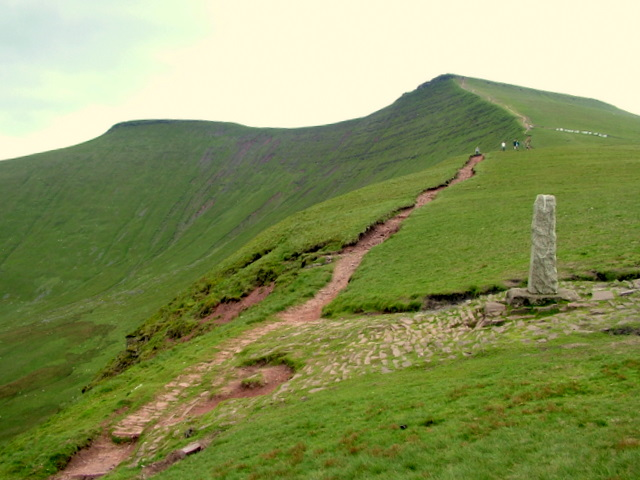
The Tommy Jones obelisk with Pen y Fan (left) and Corn Du (right)

== Glacial lakes ==
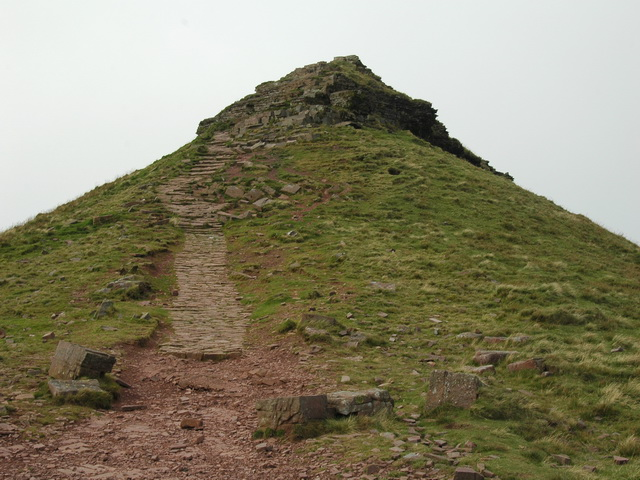
Summit of Corn Du

Nearby is one of the few natural lakes in the park, the small Llyn Cwm Llwch. It may be compared with the much larger glacial lakes of Llyn y Fan Fach and Llyn y Fan Fawr below the main ridge of the Black Mountain about 15 miles west of the central Brecon Beacons escarpment. All three are of glacial origin and were formed during the last ice age by ice scouring out hollows below the peaks, the water being partly dammed by moraines of rock debris carried down by ice action subsequent to plucking and frost shattering.
