= Waun Lefrith =

Hill (676.1m) in Carmarthenshire, Wales

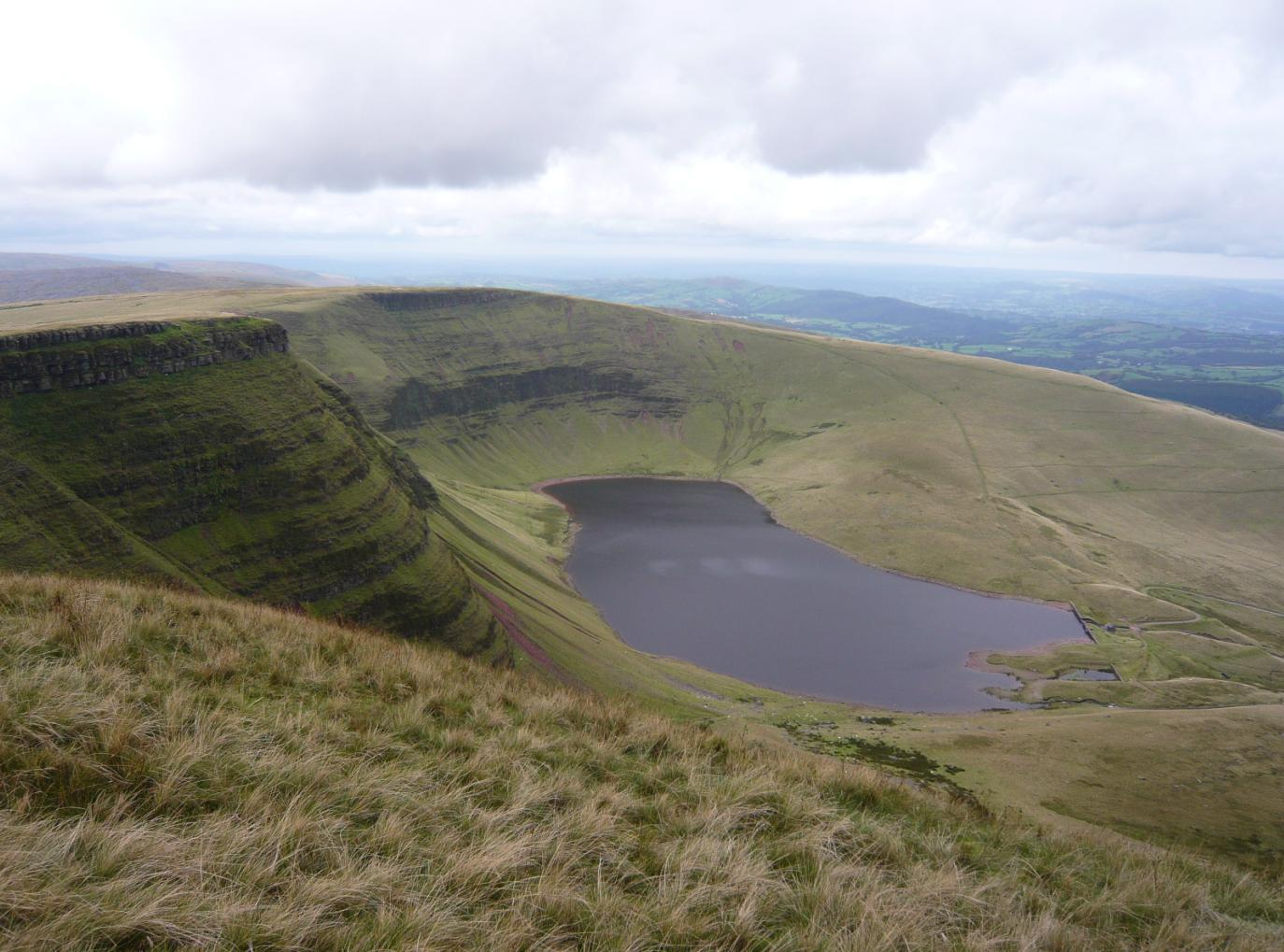
- Waun Lefrith from Picws Du

Highest point
- Elevation: 677 m (2,221 ft)
- Prominence: 15 m (49 ft)
- Parent peak: Picws Du
- Listing: Nuttall
- Coordinates: 51.8796°N 3.7492°W

Naming
- English translation: milk bog
- Language of name: Welsh

Geography
- Location: Carmarthenshire, Wales
- Parent range: Brecon Beacons
- OS grid: SN825217

Waun Lefrith is a top of Picws Du and is also the westernmost of the Carmarthen Fans (Welsh: Bannau Sir Gaer), a group of peaks within the Black Mountain (Y Mynydd Du) of the Brecon Beacons National Park (Parc Cenedlaethol Bannau Brycheiniog). It lies within Carmarthenshire, Wales. The summit plateau of the mountain reaches a height of 2221 feet above sea level. Picws Du and Fan Foel are the other, higher summits of the Carmarthen Fans (Bannau Sir Gaer). The glacial lake of Llyn y Fan Fach dominates the panorama to the north of the peak. Beyond the lake to the north lies the Usk Reservoir and then the Cambrian Mountains on the horizon. Swansea Bay and the Bristol Channel are visible to the south across the undulating dip slope of the mountain. The Towy (Tywi) valley lies to the west, with Llandovery and Llandeilo as important market towns nearest to the hills.

== Geology ==
Waun Lefrith is formed from the sandstones and mudstones of the Brownstones Formation of the Old Red Sandstone laid down during the Devonian period. Its southern slopes are formed from the hard-wearing sandstones of the overlying Plateau Beds Formation which are of upper/late Devonian age. It is those rocks which form vertical crags along the top edge of the scarp. The northern face of Waun Lefrith was home to a glacier during the ice ages which gouged out the cwm in which Llyn y Fan Fach now sits. This empties via the Afon Sawdde into the River Towy. The southern slopes drain via the Twrch Fechan, the Nant Menyn and Nant Lluestau into the Afon Twrch and so into the River Tawe. Large moraines occur to the east of the summit at the base of the scarp, and below the prominent peak of Picws Du as well as those damming the Lake.

== Access ==
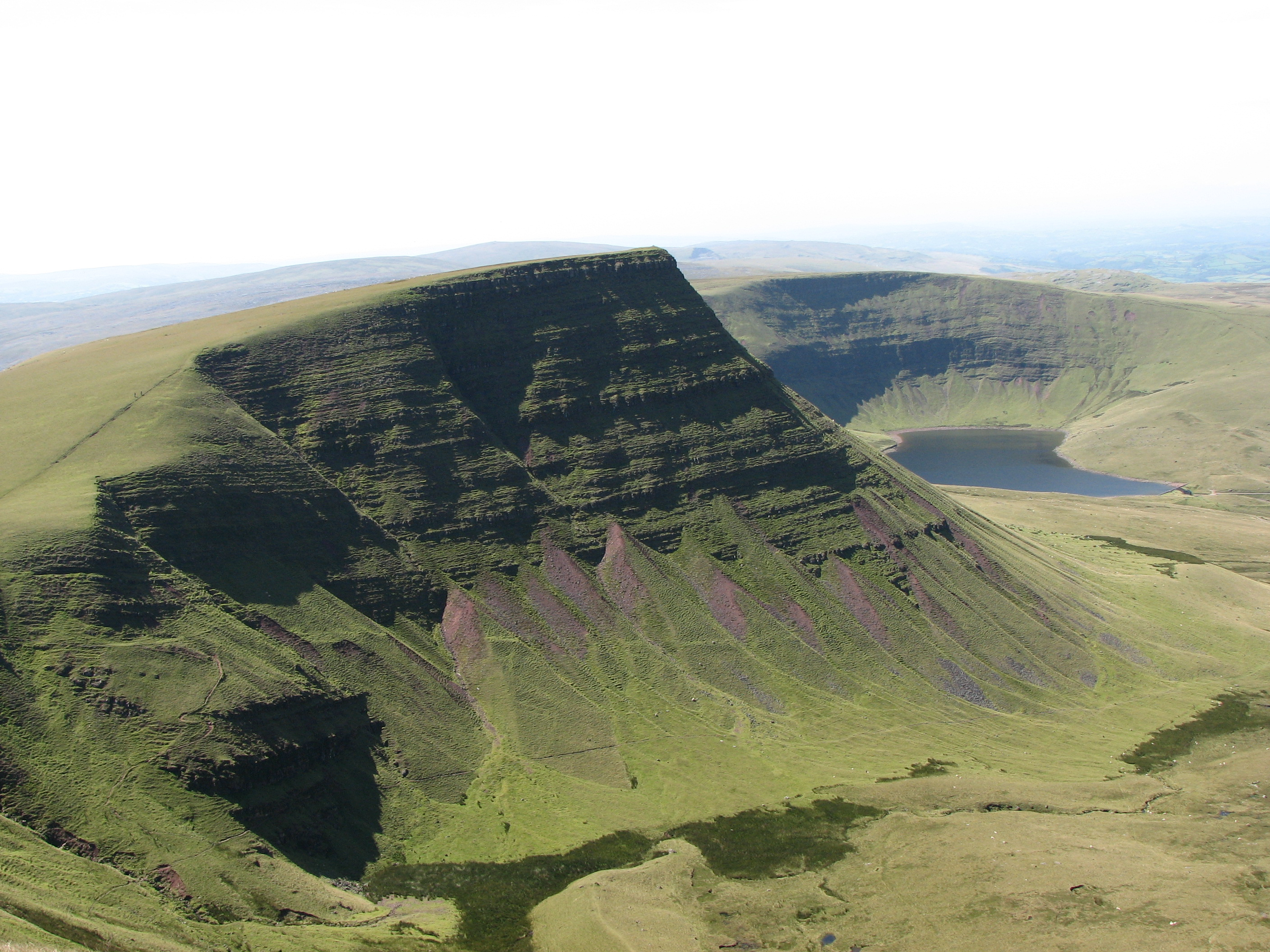
Llyn y Fan Fach lake beyond Picws Du

The entire mountain is open country and so freely accessible to walkers. The most popular path of ascent is that from the car park at the foot of the water board road running steeply up to Llyn y Fan Fach and over which lake the mountain looms. It lies to the east of the small village of Llanddeusant. However, the road is in very bad condition for car travel, and poorly signposted. The ridge running up to the peak starts at the dam on the lake (where there is a small refuge hut or bothy) and rises west up the hill before turning along the edge of the cliff above the lake. The walk along the escarpment gives excellent aerial views of the lake, although some care is needed in poor visibility or cold weather.

The high level route of the Beacons Way from Llangadog to Abergavenny runs over Waun Lefrith whilst the low level route runs along the foot of its northern escarpment to the small glacial lake of Llyn y Fan Fach. Most of the upper part of the mountain is covered with peat bogs, but the footpath is protected at some points by stone pavements. The path follows the edge of the escarpment, giving panoramic views in all directions. The footpath from Llanddeusant avoids the parallel tarmacked road to the dam, rising along the ridge which leads directly to the summit.

As in all mountains care is needed when the weather is poor, when visibility falls due to mist, fog or driving rain and snow. Navigation can become difficult when landmarks disappear, and especially dangerous when walking along the edge of the escarpment. A prismatic compass and local map are essential companions to aid route finding. There are relatively few walkers on the Black Mountain, even when the weather is good and clear, so the walker must rely on his or her own resources to complete a circuit.

== Wildlife ==
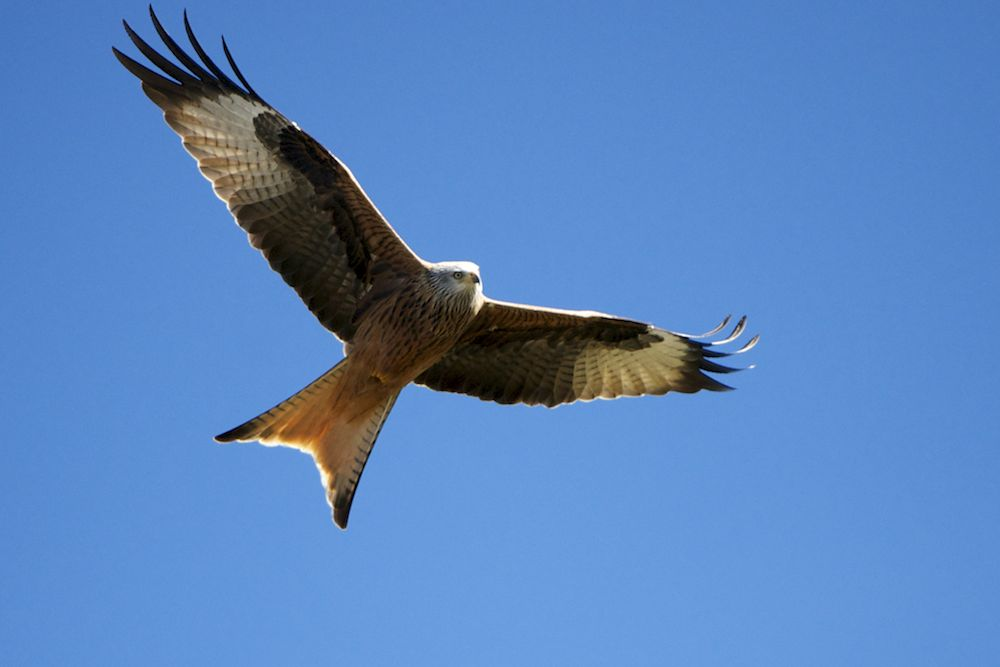
Red kite in flight showing distinctive tail feathers

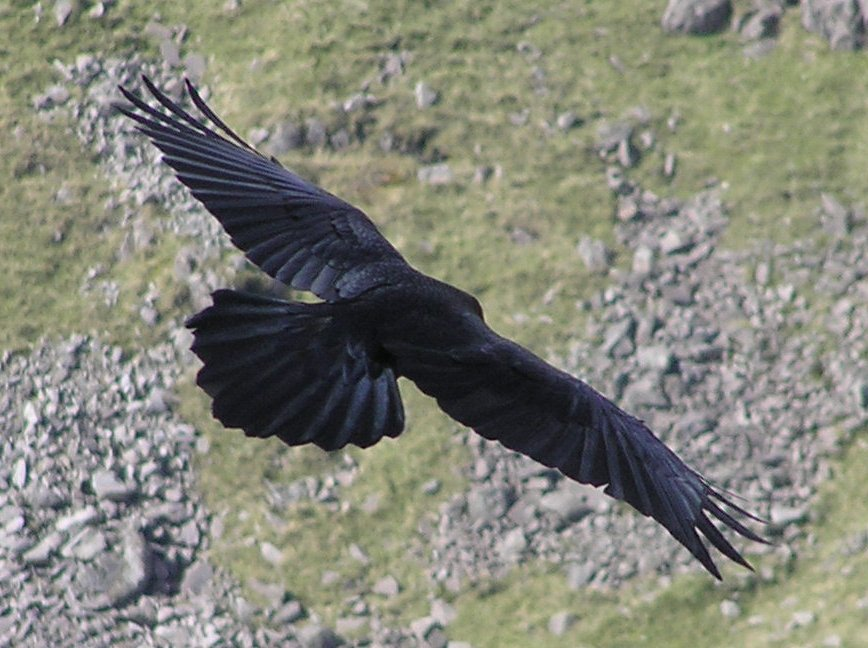
carrion crow in flight

There are numerous different species of bird in the area, and they include the red kite, common buzzard, kestrel, carrion crow, common raven and jackdaw as well as the skylark, to name a few of the most obvious residents. The kestrel and buzzard are widely distributed, but the raven is restricted to the higher mountains. The red kite survived in this area and was the last refuge of the species thanks to the lack of shoots for game birds. It has now been reintroduced to many parts of England and Wales thanks to campaigns run by the RSPB and Forestry Commission, for example. There are several game birds such as pheasant and red grouse. There is a wide distribution of mammals such as field voles, foxes and badgers as well as many songbirds. The skylark is plentiful due to the extensive rough pasture present below the main peaks which allows ground nesting of the species. Pied wagtails are common near the streams and torrents running from the hill tops.
