= Picws Du =

Mountain (749.1m) in Carmarthenshire, Wales

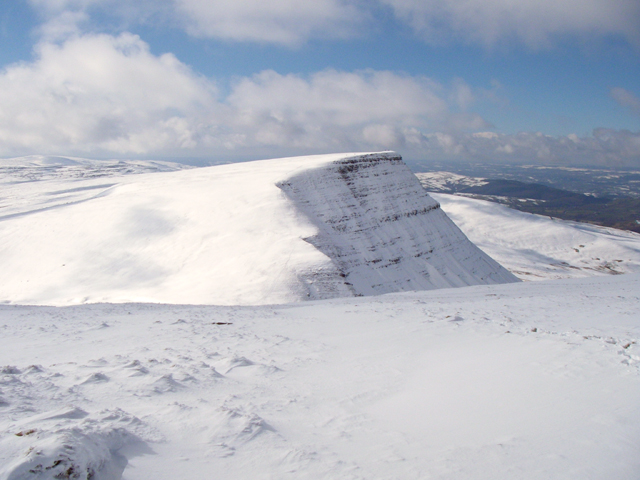
- Picws Du from Fan Brycheiniog

Highest point
- Elevation: 749 m (2,457 ft)
- Prominence: 93 m (305 ft)
- Parent peak: Fan Brycheiniog
- Listing: Hewitt, Nuttall, sub HuMP
- Coordinates: 51.8826°N 3.7277°W

Naming
- Language of name: Welsh

Geography
- Location: Carmarthenshire, Wales
- Parent range: Brecon Beacons
- OS grid: SN825217

Listed summits of Picws Du
Name	Grid ref	Height	Status
Waun Lefrith	SN969193	677 metres (2,221 ft)	Nuttall

Picws Du is the second highest peak of the Carmarthen Fans (Welsh: Bannau Sir Gâr or Bannau Sir Gaer) in the Carmarthenshire section of the Black Mountain in the west of the Brecon Beacons National Park in south Wales. The highest peak is Fan Foel immediately next along the ridge and it is a subsidiary summit of Fan Brycheiniog. Picws Du falls within Fforest Fawr Geopark and its prominent summit is marked by a large Bronze Age round barrow at a height of 2457 feet above sea level. Waun Lefrith is the other, lower summit of the Carmarthen Fans situated to the west. The peak overlooks the glacial lake of Llyn y Fan Fach in the cwm below. As the peak sits on the edge of the escarpment on a ridge which juts out into the valley below, the views from the summit are panoramic and extensive. The views to the north are especially impressive when the weather is clear, looking towards the Cambrian Mountains, Mynydd Epynt and Brecon. Swansea and the Bristol Channel can just be seen on the horizon to the south, across the gently falling dip slope. Pen y Fan and Corn Du are distinctive landmarks seen directly to the east across Fforest Fawr.

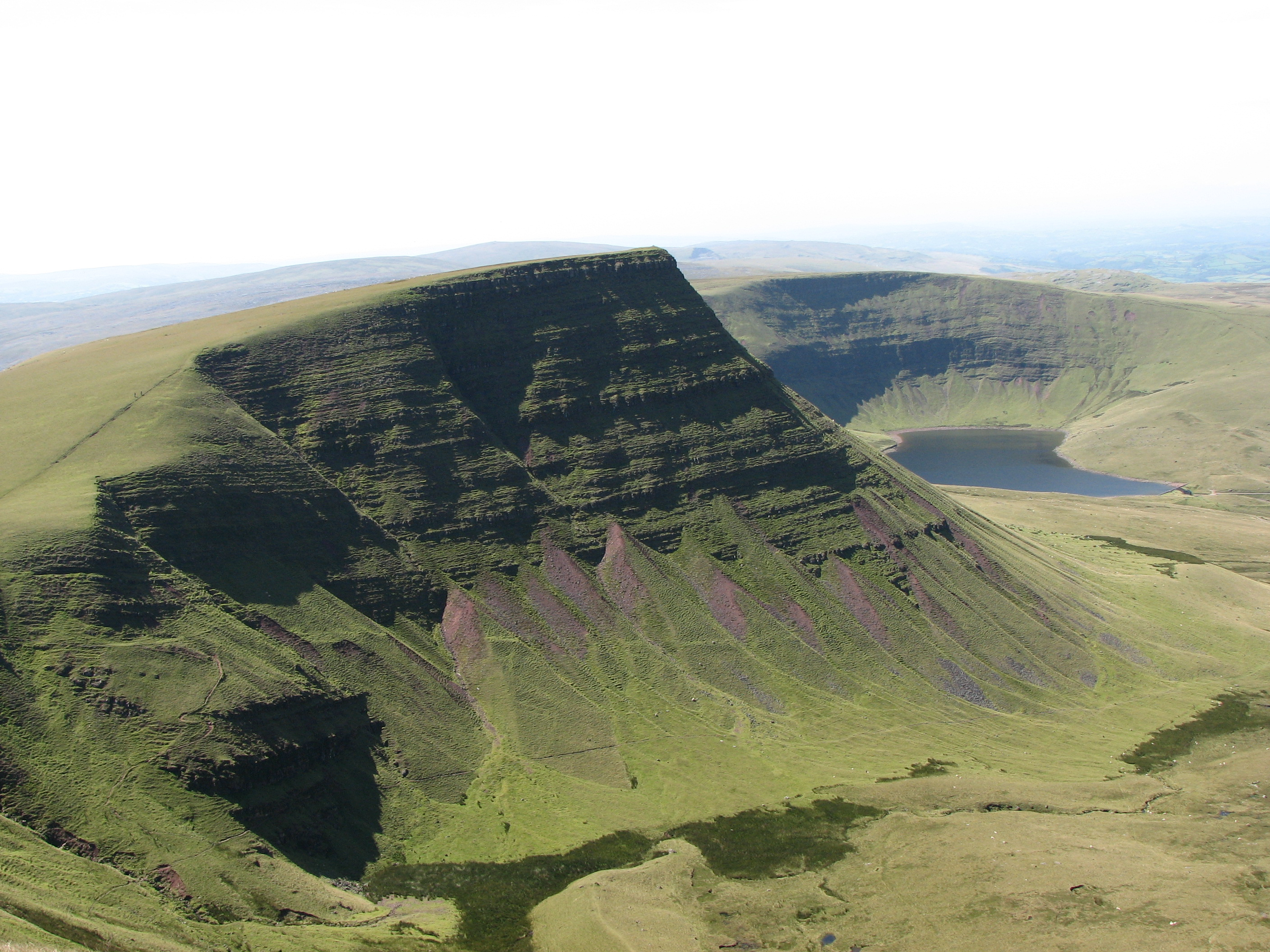
Llyn y Fan Fach lake below Picws Du

== Geology ==
Picws Du is formed from the sandstones and mudstones of the Brownstones Formation of the Lower Old Red Sandstone laid down during the early Devonian period. Its summit and southern slopes are formed from the hard-wearing sandstones of the overlying Pen y Fan Formation (formerly the Plateau Beds) which are of upper/late Devonian age. The northwestern and northeast faces of Picws Du were home to small glaciers during the ice ages which gouged out the cirques of Pwll yr Henllyn and Pant y Bwlch respectively. These cwms drain via the Afon Sawdde into the River Towy to the west. The southern slopes drain into the Afon Twrch and the slopes to the east so into the River Tawe. The glacial lake of Llyn y Fan Fach is situated below the summit to the west, and is only slightly smaller than its companion Llyn y Fan Fawr about 2 miles to the east. There are several large linear moraines below the cliffs, similar to that below Fan Hir, some of which retain small pools. Beneath the cliffs of the north face is an apron of talus which has been deeply gullied through the action of debris flows, the site being reckoned as affording the best examples of such flows in Britain.

== Archaeology ==
The summit hosts a very large Bronze Age round barrow which is in a degraded state and remains unexcavated. It is likely to originate from the same period as burial cairns at the summits of Pen y Fan and Fan Foel, when the climate was much warmer than today, and the now deserted sub-arctic and tree-less landscape supported a larger human population than at present. There are several legends associated with the glacial lake below the summit, Llyn y Fan Fach, one of which is the story of the Lady of the Lake.

== Access ==
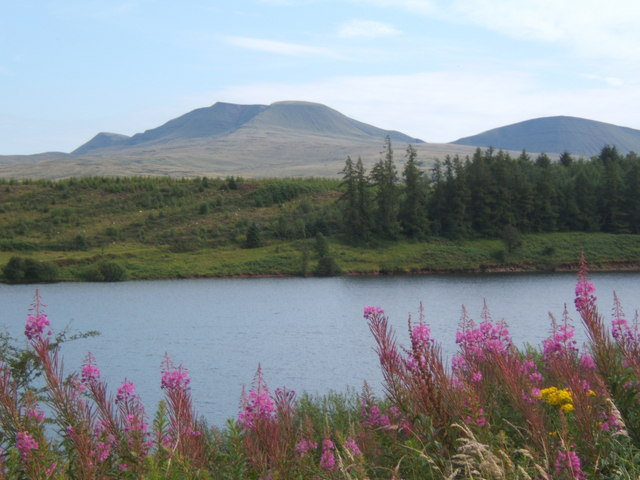
The Black Mountain range seen from the Usk Reservoir with Picws Du at right

The entire mountain is open country and so freely accessible to walkers. The most popular approach includes a circuit of the neighbouring peaks of Waun Lefrith and Fan Foel. The high level route of the Beacons Way from Llangadog to Abergavenny runs over Picws Du whilst the low level route runs up to Llyn y Fan Fach and beside the Afon Sychlwch at the foot of its northern escarpment. The higher route follows the edge of the escarpment from near Fan Hir, where the path climbs the escarpment from Llyn y Fan Fawr. Stone pavements have been added at especially wet parts of the path, where the path crosses peat bogs. There is a well built stone staircase climbing the escarpment where the Beacons Way rises from Llyn y Fan Fawr to Fan Brycheiniog.

Access to the mountain is also possible from the car park at the foot of the road leading to the small dam on Llyn y Fan Fach. The road gives an easy but steep route to the lake. The footpath rises from the dam wall up the ridge to the east until it reaches the cliff above the lake. It then follows the cliff edge across Waun Lefrith to the summit, passing several rock outcrops and gullies dropping to the lake below. The views are extensive to the south with Swansea visible as well as the Bristol Channel. Views to the north include Mynydd Epynt and Brecon, with Llandeilo and the Tywi valley to the west.

== Wildlife ==
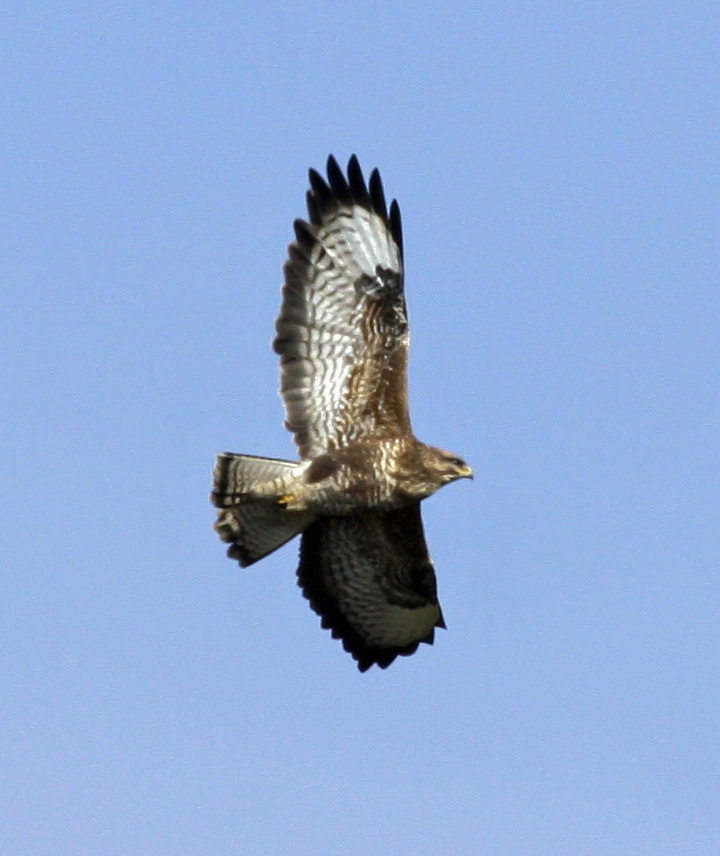
Common buzzard in flight, Devon, England. There are around 40,000 breeding pairs in the United Kingdom

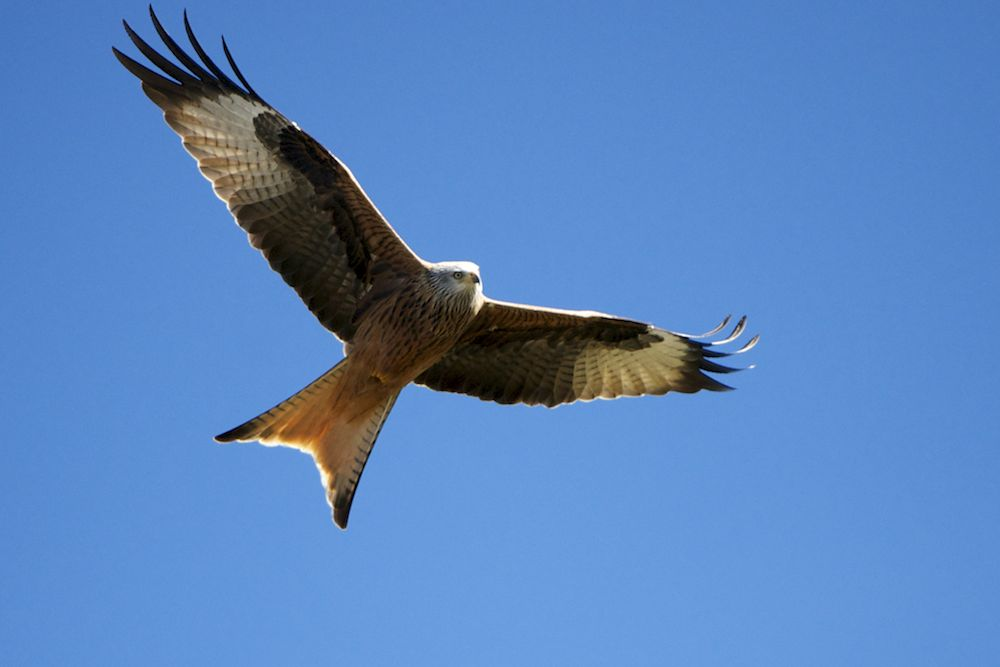
Red kite in flight showing distinctive tail feathers

There are numerous different species of bird in the area, and they include the red kite, common buzzard, kestrel, carrion crow, common raven and skylark to name a few of the most obvious residents. The red kite was previously restricted to this and adjoining areas in South Wales such as Mynydd Mallaen, owing to persecution from farmers and gamekeepers who thought (wrongly) that the bird attacked game birds. The red kite has since been re-introduced widely in many parts of Britain, such as the Chilterns and Northamptonshire. The kestrel and buzzard are widely distributed, but the raven is mainly restricted to the higher mountains. There is a wide distribution of mammals such as field voles, rabbits, foxes, weasels and badgers as well as many songbirds. The skylark is plentiful due to the extensive rough pasture present below the main peaks which allows ground nesting of the species. Pied wagtails are common near the streams and torrents running from the hill tops.

The mountain tops are above the tree line, and sessile oak is found clinging to the lower valley sides where they are sheltered from the winds. There are also a number of conifer forests maintained by Natural Resources Wales on the lower slopes.

== See also ==
- List of Scheduled prehistoric Monuments in Carmarthenshire
