= Garreg Las =

Mountain (635m) in Carmarthenshire, Wales

- Twyn Swnd
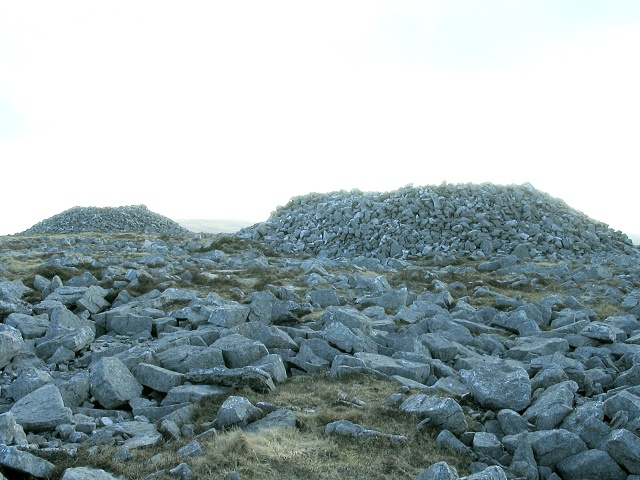
- Cairns on the summit of Garreg Las

Highest point
- Elevation: 635 m (2,083 ft)
- Prominence: 92 m (302 ft)
- Parent peak: Fan Brycheiniog
- Listing: Hewitt, Nuttall, Sub-HuMP
- Coordinates: 51.8679°N 3.7767°W

Naming
- English translation: blue rock
- Language of name: Welsh

Geography
- Location: Carmarthenshire, Wales
- Parent range: Brecon Beacons
- OS grid: SN778207

Garreg Las is a subsidiary summit of Fan Brycheiniog in the Brecon Beacons National Park (Welsh: Parc Cenedlaethol Bannau Brycheiniog) in Carmarthenshire, southern Wales. Its summit sits towards the northern end of a broad north–south ridge, Esgair Hir ("long ridge"), at 635 metres (2,083 ft) above sea level. The hill is sometimes referred to as Twyn Swnd.

A subsidiary top just over 1 kilometre (0.62 mi) to the north of the main summit is Carreg yr Ogof (meaning "rock of the cave"), whose name reflects its limestone geology. Its top, at 585 metres (1,919 ft) above sea level, is crowned by a trig point.

== Geology ==
Garreg Las is formed from the Twrch Sandstone, a coarse sandstone (formerly known as the Basal Grit) of the Marros Group (formerly the Millstone Grit Series) which was laid down during the Carboniferous period. Wrapped around its northern and western flanks is a narrow band of Carboniferous Limestone which gives rise to a karst landscape. The Twrch Fechan Fault defines its eastern margin and brings Old Red Sandstone rocks into contact with the limestone on this flank. A number of major shakeholes in the Basal Grit adorn these eastern flanks, one of which, known as 'Pwll Cynrig' is flooded.

== Archaeology ==
On the summit are two prehistoric cairns known as Carnau'r Garreg Las. A further cairn, known as Carn y Gigfran, lies a few hundred metres to the north of Carreg yr Ogof. They are likely to be of British Bronze Age date like so many of the stone barrows and cairns along the length of the Brecon Beacons. A round barrow on Fan Foel was excavated in 2002-4 and showed a date of about 2000 BC with two separate burials in the cairn. However, it was low and small compared with the large stone cairns. It is also likely that both cairns and barrows possess multiple interments, again like other cairns in the area. What makes them interesting is their great size of about 20 metre diameter, indicating their importance to the prehistoric local community.

== Access ==
The hill is entirely classed as open country and therefore freely available to walkers. A bridleway approaches the hill from Llanddeusant to the north and is followed in part by the Beacons Way which runs from Llangadog to Abergavenny and which continues southwards over the hill.
