= Garreg Lwyd (Black Mountain) =

Mountain (616m) in Carmarthenshire, Wales

Coordinates: 51.84544°N 3.83051°W

Garreg Lwyd\Moel Gornach
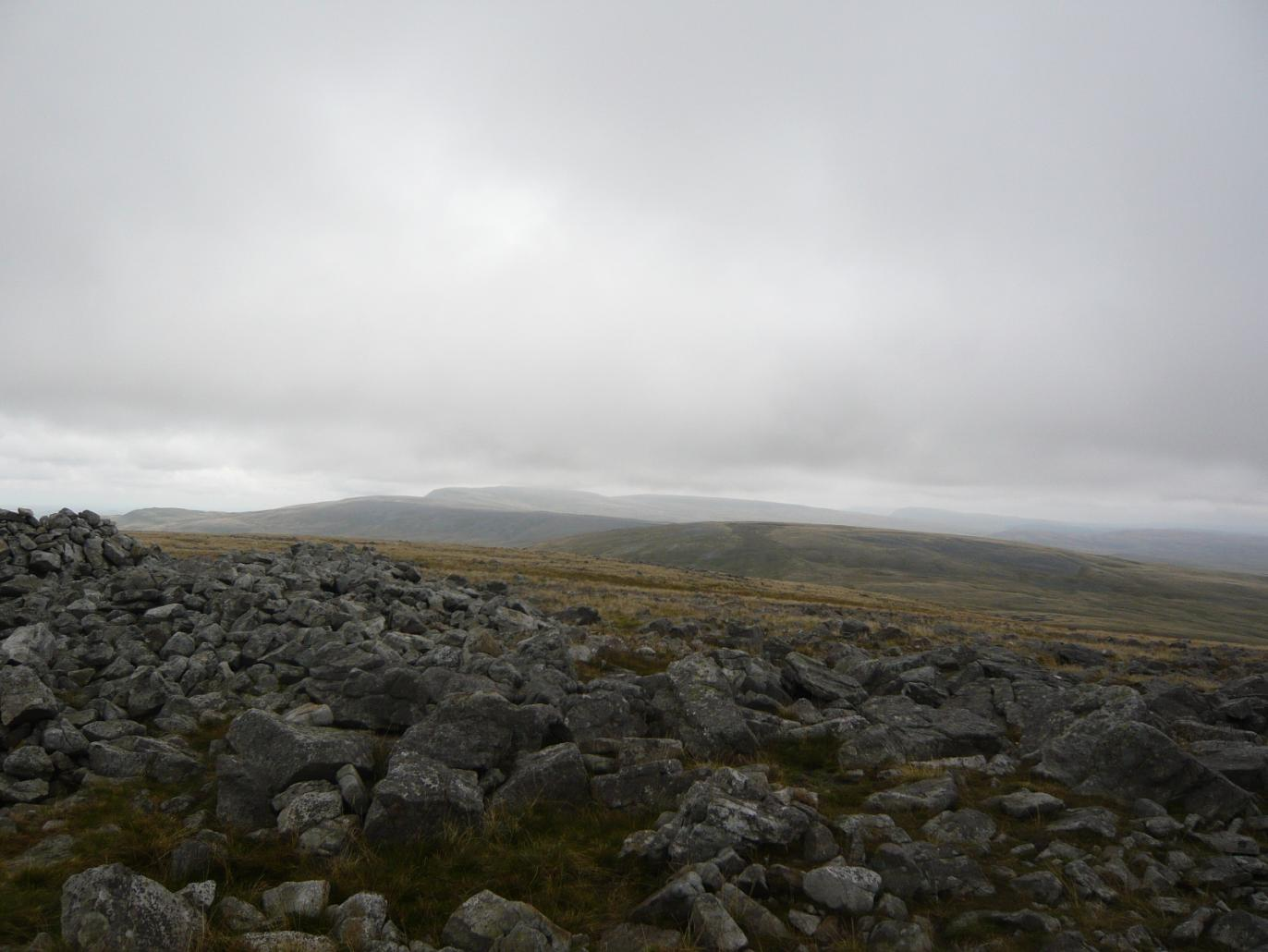
- Foel Fraith, Garreg Las and Fan Brycheiniog from Garreg Lwyd summit

Highest point
- Elevation: 616 m (2,021 ft)
- Prominence: 104 m (341 ft)
- Parent peak: Fan Brycheiniog
- Listing: Hewitt, Nuttall, HuMP

Naming
- English translation: grey rock
- Language of name: Welsh
- Pronunciation: Welsh: [ˈɡarɛɡ lʊi̯d]

Geography
- Location: Carmarthenshire, Wales
- Parent range: Brecon Beacons
- OS grid: SN740179
- Topo map: OS Landranger 160

Garreg Lwyd, also known as Moel Gornach, is a peak in the Black Mountain of the Brecon Beacons, South Wales. It is a subsidiary summit of Fan Brycheiniog.

It is the westernmost area over 2,000 feet above sea level in South Wales. Although no marked path crosses the mountain, it may be climbed from the car parks on the A4069 between Brynamman and Llangadog. A cairn with a trig point marks the summit.
