= Fan Brycheiniog =

Hill (801.7m) in Powys, Wales

Coordinates: 51.88144°N 3.70848°W

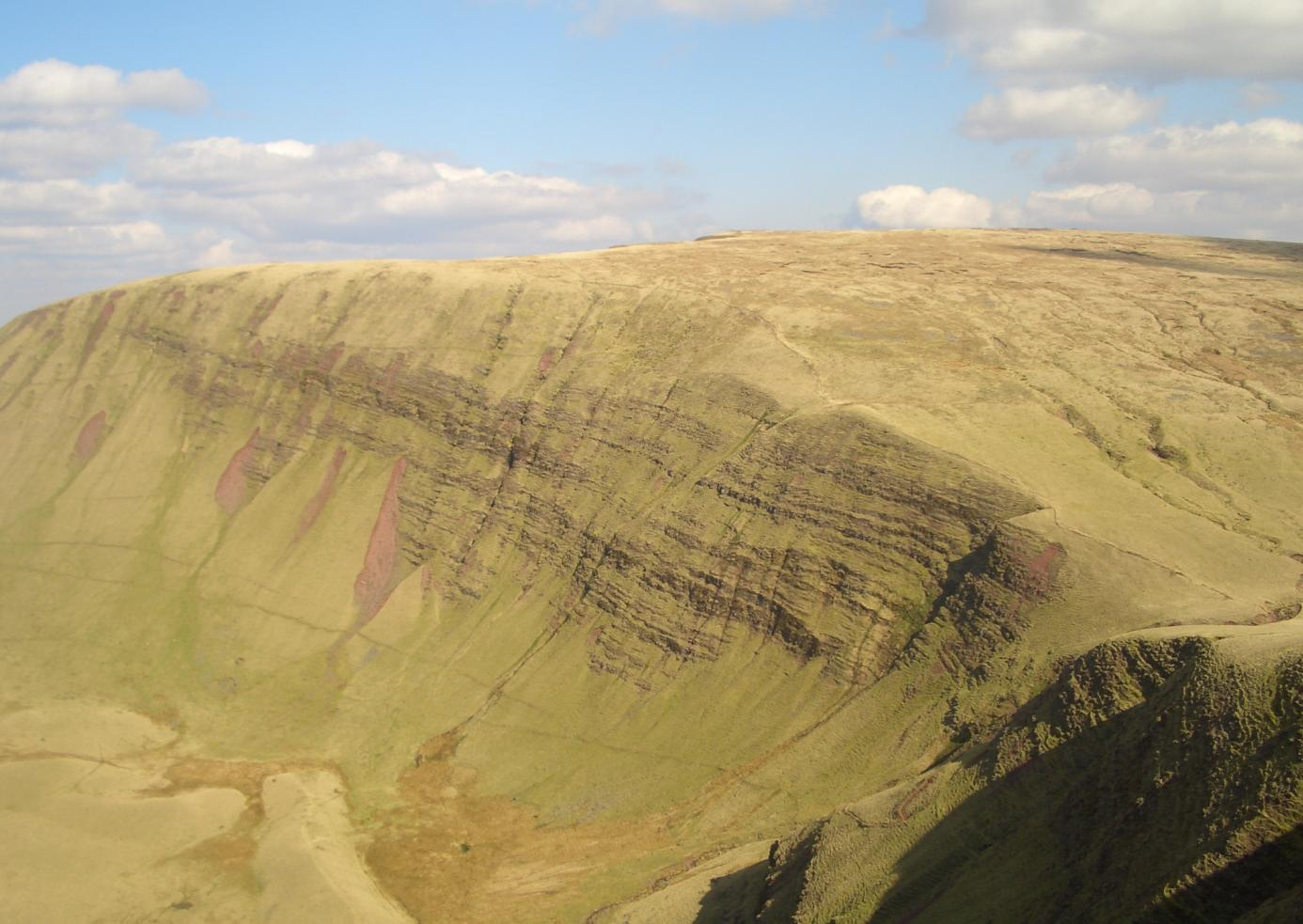
- Fan Brycheiniog from Picws Du

Highest point
- Elevation: 802.5 m (2,633 ft)
- Prominence: 425 m (1,394 ft)
- Parent peak: Pen y Fan
- Isolation: 18.02 km (11.20 mi)
- Listing: Marilyn, Hewitt, Nuttall

Naming
- English translation: Brecknock beacon
- Language of name: Welsh
- Pronunciation: Welsh: [ˈvan brəˈχei̯njɔɡ]

Geography
- Location: Powys, Wales
- Parent range: Brecon Beacons
- OS grid: SN825217

Listed summits of Fan Brycheiniog
| Name | Grid ref | Height | Status |
|---|---|---|---|
| Fan Hir | SN969193 | 761 m (2,497 ft) | Hewitt, Nuttall |
| Picws Du | SN969193 | 749 m (2,457 ft) | Hewitt, Nuttall |
| Garreg Las | SN969193 | 635 m (2,083 ft) | Hewitt, Nuttall |
| Garreg Lwyd | SN969193 | 616 m (2,021 ft) | Hewitt, Nuttall |
| Foel Fraith | SN969193 | 602 m (1,975 ft) | sub Hewitt |

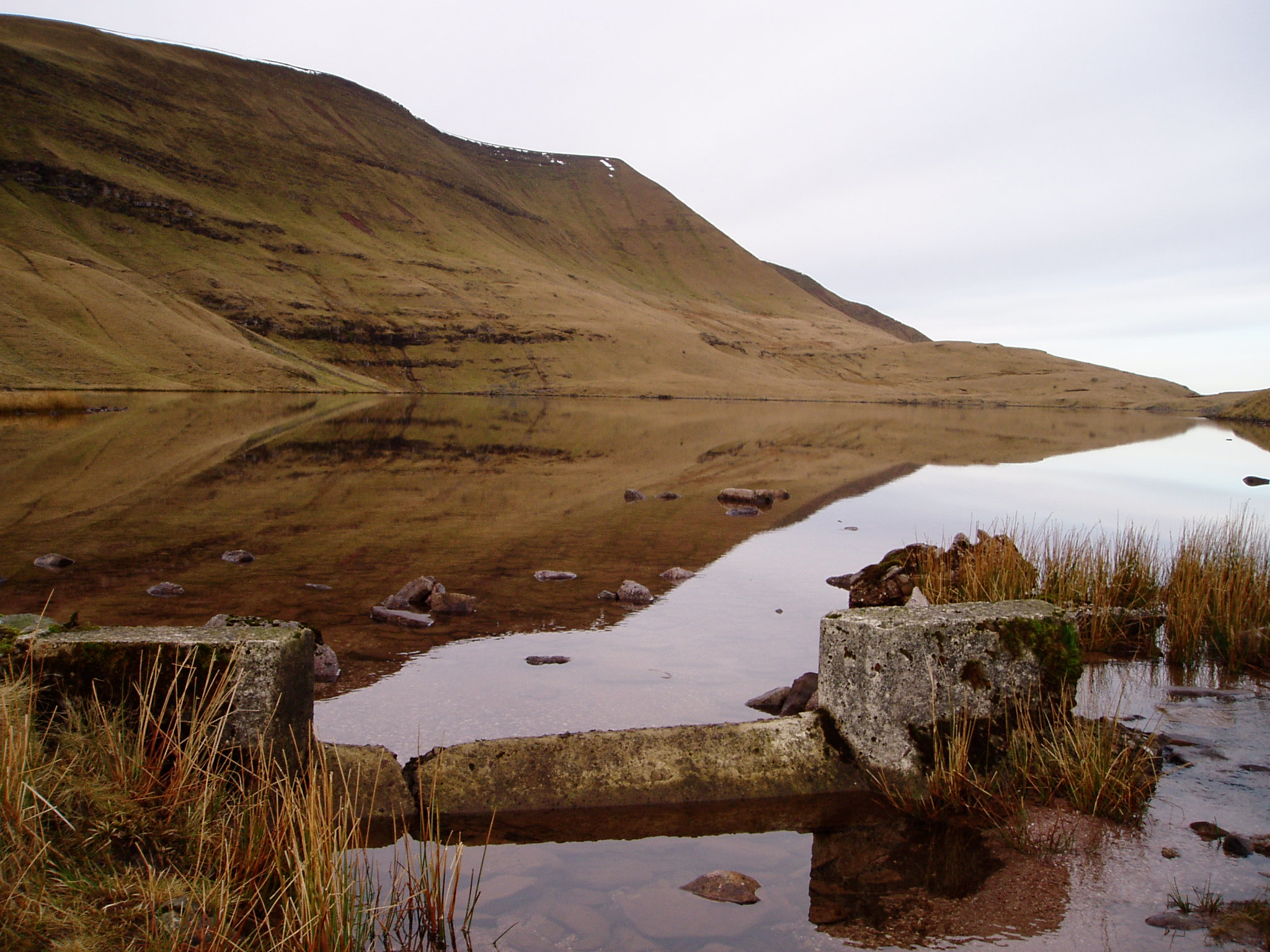
Llyn y Fan Fawr, below Fan Brycheiniog in the Black Mountain

Fan Brycheiniog is the highest peak at a height of 802.5 metres (2,633 ft) (above sea level) in the Black Mountain (Y Mynydd Du) region of the Brecon Beacons National Park in southern Wales. There is a trig point at the peak and on the edge of the escarpment, and nearby, a stone shelter with an inner seat. It lies just inside the historic county of Brecknockshire (now part of the Powys council area) which gives the mountain its Welsh name. A subsidiary top (Fan Foel), less than a kilometre from the summit along the ridge to the northwest, is the highest point (county top) of the neighbouring county of Carmarthenshire. Fan Brycheiniog is also within the Fforest Fawr Geopark designated in 2005 in recognition of the area's geological heritage. The views of the moorland and open country to the north are spectacular when the weather is clear, and reveals the isolation of the range, especially when compared with the more popular Pen y Fan range to the east.

== Access ==
The Beacons Way, a waymarked long distance footpath heading southwest from Llanddeusant passes along the summit ridge before descending to the southern end of the lake Llyn y Fan Fawr to the east of the summit, en route to Abercraf in the southeast. The path crosses several peat bogs, but there are stone pavements in many places to protect the walker from the wet conditions. There is a stone staircase of regular downward gradient across the escarpment to the lake below. It is easily followed, and is dry underfoot when the weather is clear. The path leads on to Picws Du and Waun Lefrith above the smaller glacial lake of Llyn y Fan Fach. These two lakes are notable as two of the few natural bodies of water in the park. Fan Foel and these two peaks form the so-called Carmarthen Van, since they fall within Carmarthenshire, which has its border with Powys at Fan Foel.

== Geology ==
Fan Brycheiniog is formed from the sandstones and mudstones of the Brownstones Formation of the Old Red Sandstone laid down during the Devonian period. Its summit and southern slopes are formed from the hard-wearing sandstones of the overlying Plateau Beds Formation which are of upper/late Devonian age. The cwm below the summit drains into the River Usk to the north. The southern slopes drain into the Afon Twrch and the slopes to the east drain into the River Tawe. The local soils are thin and acidic owing to the large areas of peat bog on the mountain. Vegetation includes tussock grass, cotton grass, bilberry, heather and many types of moss owing to the high rainfall on the summit.

The dip slope eventually merges with the Carboniferous limestone which outcrops in the karst landscape to the south.

== Fan Foel ==
Northwest of the main summit is a prominent subsidiary peak called Fan Foel, which at 781 metres (2,562 ft) above sea level is the highest point (county top) in the county of Carmarthenshire. It occurs on a promontory which juts out from the escarpment to form the northernmost part of the cliffs in the range, and is a prominent landmark in the entire range. There are extensive views over the moorland below in the panoramic vista revealed at the apex of the escarpment, and more extensive than the views from the main peak owing to the exposure to both east and west. There is a clear footpath which drops down from the peak to the moorland below. There are two associated peaks to the west along the ridge, Waun Lefrith and Picws Du.

== Archaeology ==
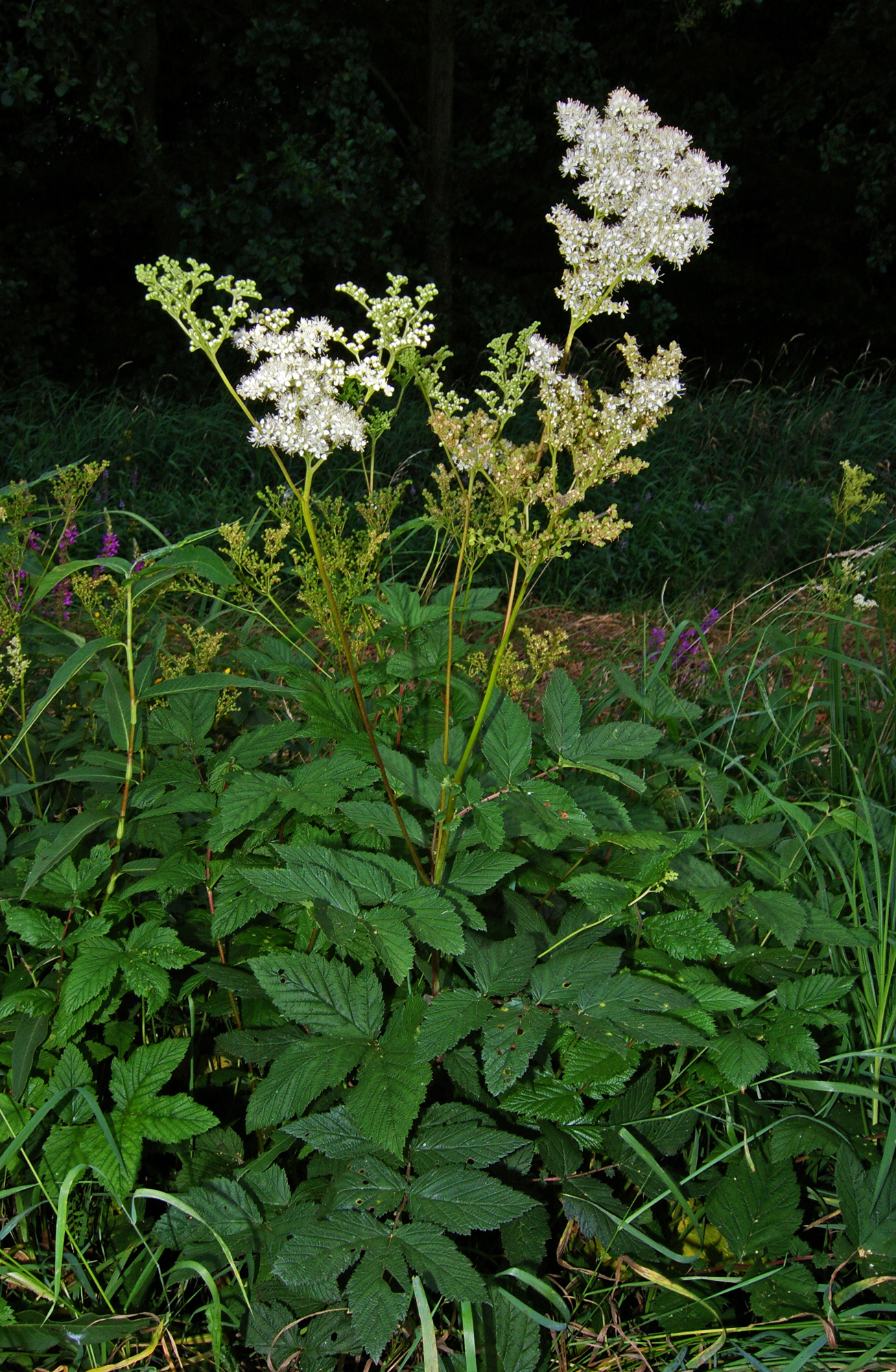
Meadowsweet flower head, remains of which were found in the burial cairn on Fan Foel

There is a Bronze Age burial cairn at the summit of Fan Foel, and it was excavated in 2002–4 with the results published in 2014 in Archaeologia Cambrensis. The round barrow was about 16 metres (about 52 feet) wide and was badly eroded with stones from the structure removed to build a central cairn by passing walkers. Excavation of the barrow showed that it contained two separate burials, the central one in a stone cist contained the burnt bones of an adult woman and two children carbon dated to about 2000 BC. The ground surface beneath the barrow was carbon dated to about 2300 BC. The cist also contained a broken pottery food vessel decorated in the style of the Beaker people as well as a chert knife. The second burial was somewhat later and contained a broken collared urn with a rare belt hook, indicating a wealthy person. The remains of meadowsweet flowers were found in the primary cist, and may represent a wreath left with the burnt bones. The large capstone which covers the cist has been left in place in the current state of the barrow (as of October 2015). The outer kerb stones are still exposed, and show how the barrow was built. There is great similarity to the early Bronze Age barrows on the summits of Pen y Fan and Corn Du, which are also exposed to show the internal cists and outer kerbstones.

Pollen analysis of the buried soil under the barrow showed that a grass-heath vegetation community dominated the summit of Fan Foel immediately prior to construction of the barrow, with hazel scrub on the lower slopes and mixed woodland with oak especially at lower levels. Charcoal was also found in the buried soil, and may indicate burning to improve soil cultivation, or alternatively, local use of fire as a beacon, as suggested by the name of the range of the Brecon Beacons. Both Pen y Fan and Corn Du are visible on the horizon about 15 miles (24 kilometres) away.

The climate was warmer than currently, judging by the evidence of extensive settlement and cultivation of the high land during the British Bronze Age.

== Wildlife ==
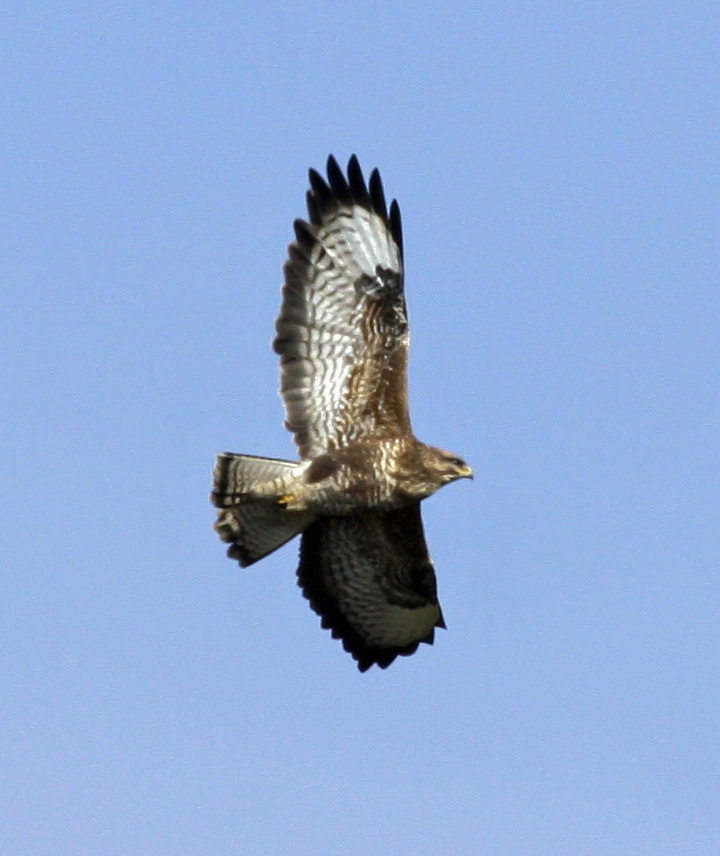
Common Buzzard in flight, Devon, England. There are around 40,000 breeding pairs in the United Kingdom

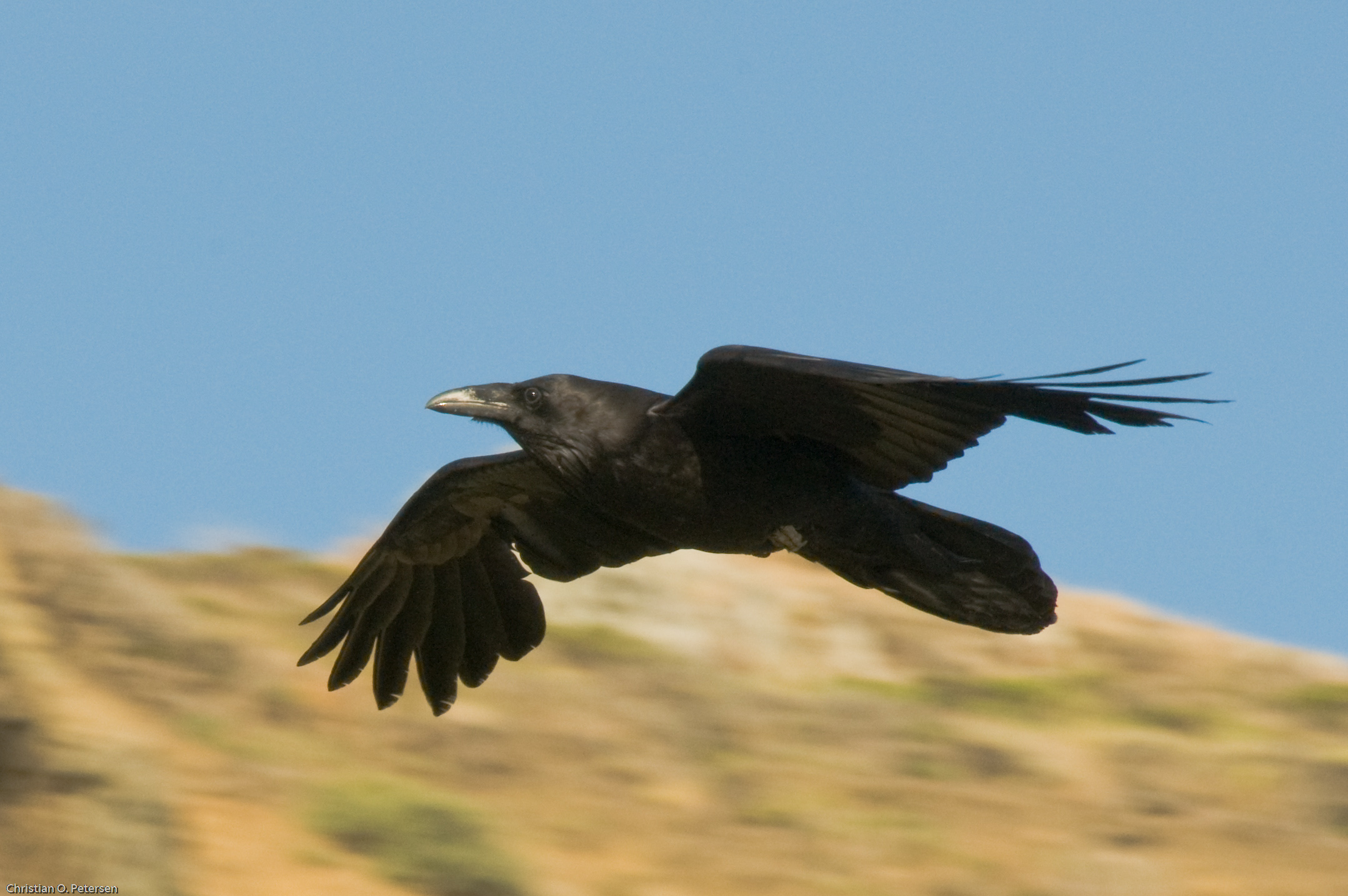
Common Raven in flight

There are numerous different species of bird in the area, and they include the red kite, common buzzard, kestrel, carrion crow, common raven and skylark to name a few of the most obvious residents. The kestrel and buzzard are widely distributed, but the raven is restricted to the higher mountains. The large birds can often be seen from the summit in good weather soaring on thermals or updrafts from the cwm below, sometimes in groups, especially for buzzards. Game birds include the Red grouse, Partridge and Pheasant although few shoots are now organised on the mountains. The birds of prey are thus not persecuted as in other mountain areas (especially the Pennines) and thrive accordingly. The Red Kite survived decades of persecution in this area, and has now repopulated much of England and Wales, thanks to campaigns run by the RSPB for example.

== See also ==
- List of Scheduled prehistoric Monuments in Carmarthenshire
- List of Scheduled prehistoric Monuments in Powys (Brecknockshire)
