= Fforest Fawr Geopark =

Geopark in Wales

Coordinates: 51.937°N 3.321°W

Fforest Fawr Geopark (pink area) within the Brecon Beacons National Park (pink plus green areas)

Fforest Fawr Geopark is a Geopark in the Brecon Beacons National Park, south Wales. It is the first designated Geopark in Wales having gained membership of both the European Geoparks Network and the UNESCO-assisted Global Network of National Geoparks in October 2005. The Geopark aims to promote and support sustainable tourism and other opportunities to improve the economy of the area whilst safeguarding the natural environment. Its aims largely coincide with the statutory duties and purpose of the National Park within which it sits.

== History of designation ==
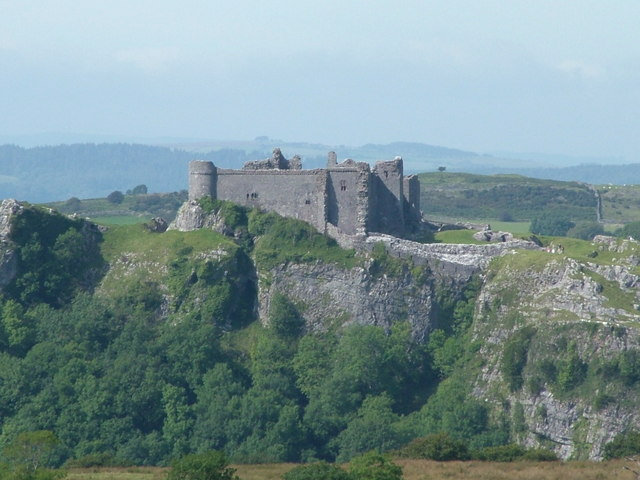
Carreg Cennen Castle near Llandeilo

An initial application to the European Geoparks Network (EGN) made for a more geographically restricted Geopark based on the upper Swansea Valley was turned down in 2003 but the present area which extends to 300 square miles (777 km^{2}) was accepted by the EGN at their meeting in October 2005.

A Geopark Development Officer was appointed in January 2007 whilst the National Park Authority also employs an education officer part of whose time is dedicated to the Geopark and the Geopark’s Waterfalls Centre was staffed by two information assistants from summer 2007 until June 2016.

The Geopark hosted a meeting of the European Geoparks Network in Brecon in spring 2011.

Together with the United Kingdom's six other geoparks, Fforest Fawr Georpark was formally recognised by UNESCO in December 2015.

In common with other European Geoparks, Fforest Fawr is reassessed on a four yearly (previously three yearly) cycle. A successful revalidation took place in 2008 after an initial three-year period of membership of the EGN with another in 2012. It was reassessed again in 2016.

== Administration of the Geopark ==
Fforest Fawr Geopark is run by a partnership of several organisations, the principal ones being Brecon Beacons National Park Authority, Cardiff University and the British Geological Survey. A Partnership Board meets annually whilst a Management Group meets quarterly to consider strategy and project work. Both the Board and the Group derive their membership from a wide cross-section of interests with a stake in the success of the Geopark. These interests include but are not restricted to:

- Swansea University
- National Trust
- Brecon Beacons Park Society
- Dyfed Archaeological Trust
- Brecon Beacons Tourism
- Earth Science Education Forum
- Natural Resources Wales

== Geography ==
The Geopark comprises the western half the Brecon Beacons National Park in southern Wales. At its heart are the mountain massifs of Fforest Fawr, the Black Mountain (Welsh: 'Y Mynydd Du') and the central Brecon Beacons. The designated area includes the surrounding lowlands; principally parts of the Usk, Towy, Tawe and Taf valleys.

=== Geology ===
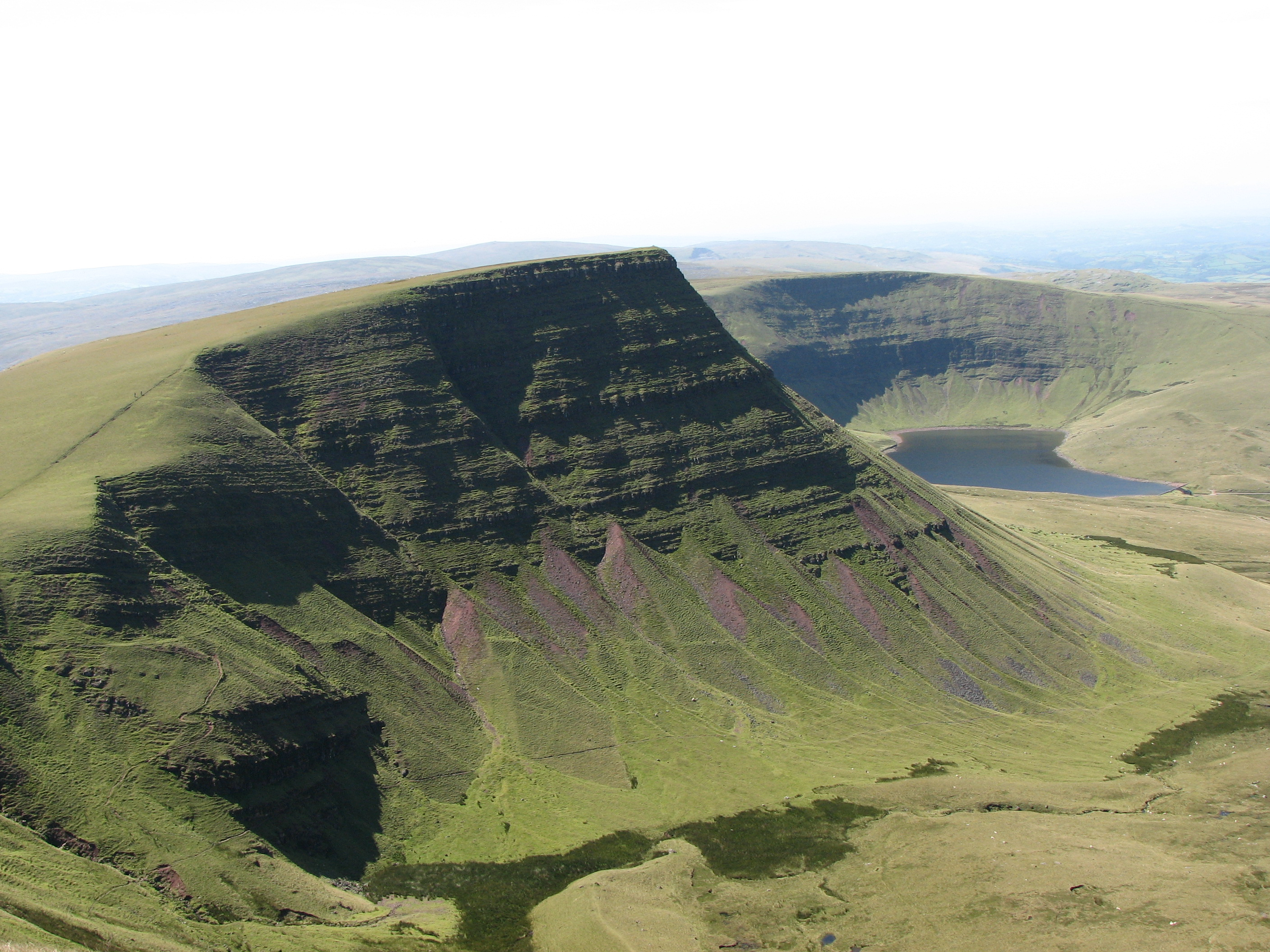
Llyn y Fan Fach lake below Picws Du with the prominent escarpment

Rocks from the Ordovician Period through to the Carboniferous outcrop in various parts of the Geopark. The oldest (of late Ordovician age) occur in the northwest whilst the youngest (of late Carboniferous age) occur along its southern margins.

Many of the Ordovician and Silurian age sandstones and mudstones were faulted and tightly folded during the Caledonian Orogeny. The overlying Devonian and Carboniferous age sandstones (e.g. Twrch Sandstone), mudstones and limestones have generally been tilted gently to the south and southwest towards the main South Wales Coalfield basin.

=== Glaciation ===
The area was subject to repeated glaciation during the Quaternary period. Glacial till covers large parts of the landscape whilst recessional moraines occur within the major valleys of the Geopark and late-glacial moraines form striking features beneath the main north and north-east facing scarps of the mountains. Both moraines and glacial lakes are visible at the foot of the spectacular north face of the Black Mountain (range), especially Llyn y Fan Fach and Llyn y Fan Fawr below the summits of Picws Du and Fan Foel. Numerous landslips have occurred in the post-glacial period in both bedrock and superficial deposits, though these are no longer active.

=== Limestone scenery ===
Karstic landforms are characteristic of the belt of limestone which runs east-west through the Geopark and include some of Britain's most extensive cave networks including its deepest (Ogof Ffynnon Ddu at 293.5 m (963 ft) and large numbers of shakeholes, the most impressive of which occur where a relatively thin cover of the younger Twrch Sandstone overlies the limestone.

The limestone has been extensively worked in the past and numerous abandoned small quarries are scattered across the outcrops of the Old Red Sandstone which has been worked for building and roofing stone. Quarries in the Twrch Sandstone yielded a very pure silica which when crushed, was specially suitable for the manufacture of firebricks. Sub-tropically weathered occurrences of this rock appear as soft sand deposits ('silica sand') which were worked for a similar purpose.

== Principal attractions ==
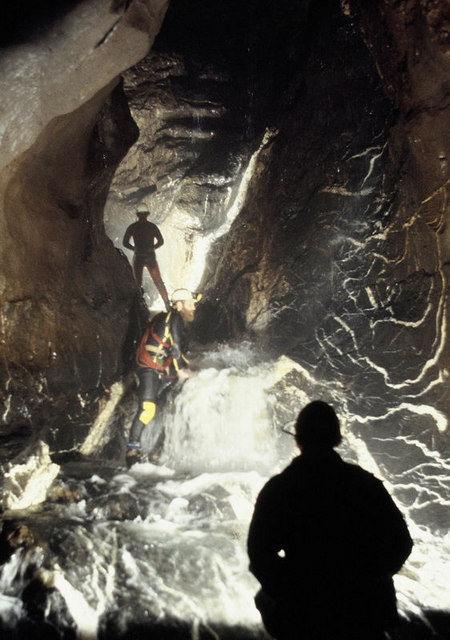
Part of the interior of Ogof Ffynnon Ddu with a terraced cascade and three standing and climbing cave explorers wearing safety equipment

The Geopark celebrates the geological and wider natural heritage of the area together with the cultural heritage relating to 7000 years of recorded human occupation of the area since the last ice age. Each of these aspects of the area are closely related to one another.

The Old Red Sandstone (ORS) forms the principal summits which have attracted walkers to the area for decades. Walks on Pen y Fan and Corn Du and over the Carmarthen Fans / Brecon Beacons are amongst the most popular. Carboniferous Limestone forms an east-west belt of country to the south of the ORS which sports some of the country’s longest and deepest cave networks such as Ogof Ffynnon Ddu and the impressive Porth yr Ogof into which the Afon Mellte flows. Further south again is a Millstone Grit landscape, the most visited part of which is Waterfall Country which boasts the finest collection of waterfalls in the UK.

Bronze Age standing stones, round barrows and stone circles, Iron Age, hillforts and mediaeval castles all feature with Maen Llia, Carn Goch and Carreg Cennen Castle being outstanding examples of each to be found in the Geopark.

The industrial archaeology of the Geopark is outstanding as the Industrial Revolution shifted into gear in the late eighteenth and early nineteenth centuries making South Wales one of the earliest industrialised societies in the world. Limekilns dot the hillsides wherever limestone puts in an appearance and tramways for conveying both raw materials and finished products are plentiful. The ambitious Brecon Forest Tramroad scheme was one of the earliest and longest tramway systems in the world. Tramways also served the silica rock mines and quarries, notably around Dinas Rock and the gorge of the Nedd Fechan at Pontneddfechan. Many of these sites are interpreted for the visitor, others are left for the enthusiast to discover.

== Events ==
Since its designation, Fforest Fawr Geopark has organised events for the public including walks and talks with National Park wardens, volunteer walk leaders and experts from the various partner organisations contributing their expertise. There is a fortnight long Geopark Festival which takes place at the end of May/start of June coinciding with similar events in Geoparks across Europe.

== Further information ==
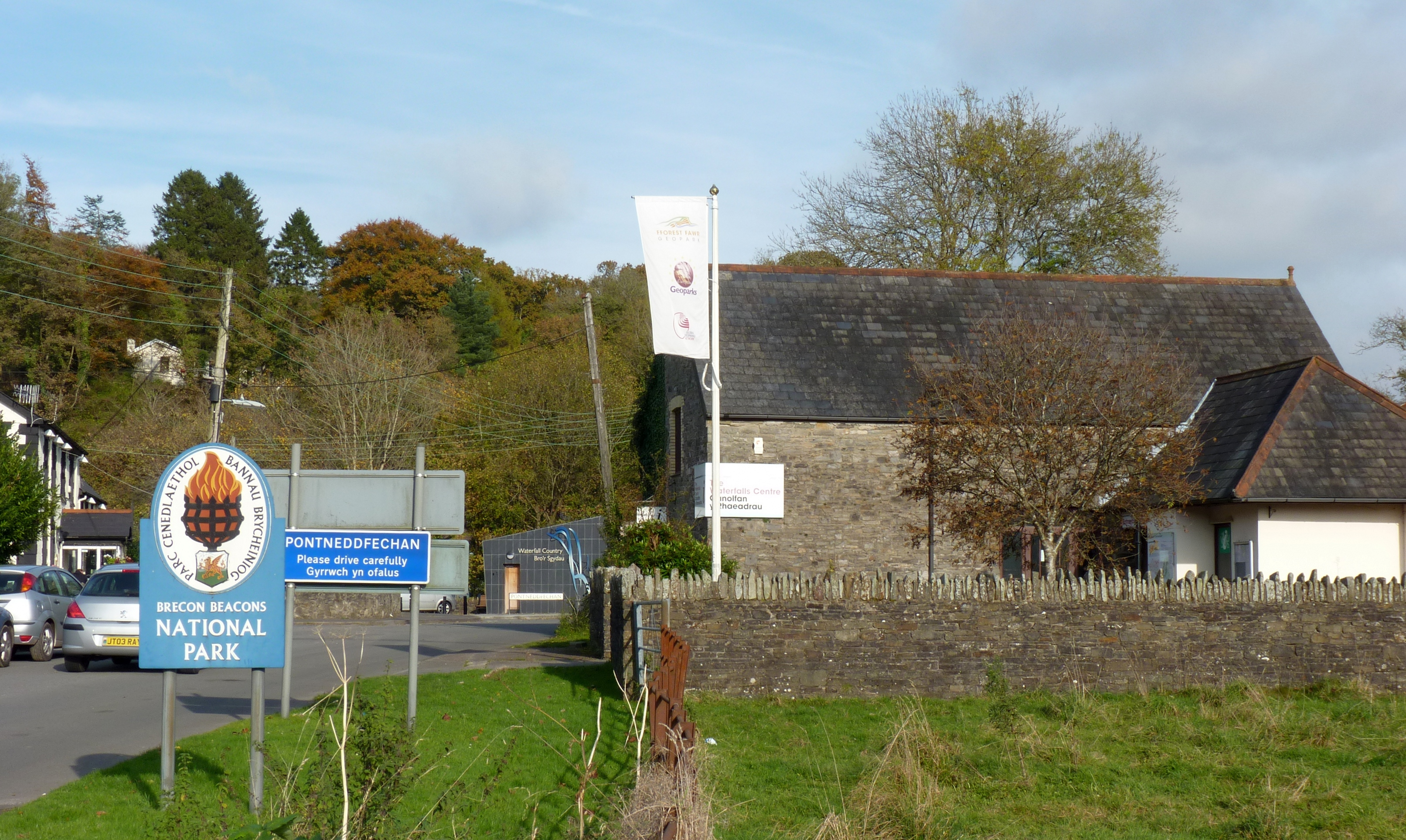
former Waterfalls Centre, Pontneddfechan, on the southern boundary of the Geopark

A major display on the geology, history and culture in the Geopark area was opened at the Waterfalls Centre in Pontneddfechan in summer 2008, remaining until the centre's closure in 2016.

Other exhibitions on aspects of the Geopark were in place until 2016 at the National Park Visitor Centre (Mountain Centre) near Libanus south-west of Brecon and at the Heritage and Information Centre in Llandovery.

Various leaflets have been published, interpretive panels erected and a website established to promote the Geopark and inform visitors about it.
