= River Sawdde =

River in Carmarthenshire, Wales

Coordinates: 51°56′N 3°54′W

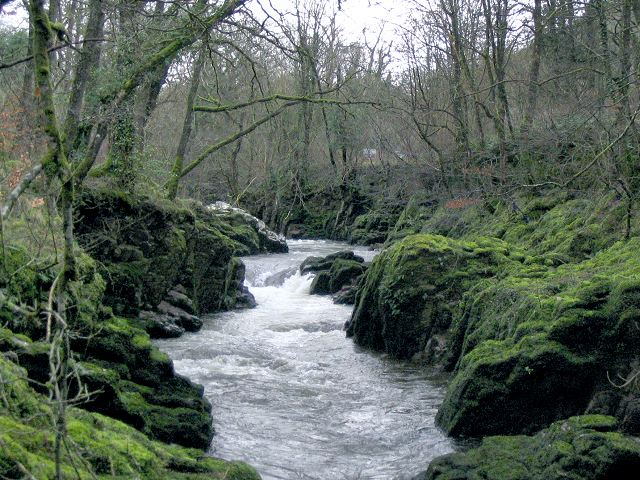
Waterfall on the Sawdde near Llangadog

The Afon Sawdde is a river in the county of Carmarthenshire, Wales. For most of its course it flows through the Brecon Beacons National Park and Fforest Fawr Geopark.

== Llyn y Fan Fach ==
The river rises on the northern slopes of the Black Mountain and flows north, then west, then northwest for a total of some 18 km to its confluence with the River Towy near Llangadog. The source of the river is Llyn y Fan Fach, a lake of glacial origin sitting in a deep cwm beneath Bannau Sir Gaer. The lake itself is intimately associated with the legend of the Lady of the Lake, a Welsh tale from the Middle Ages.

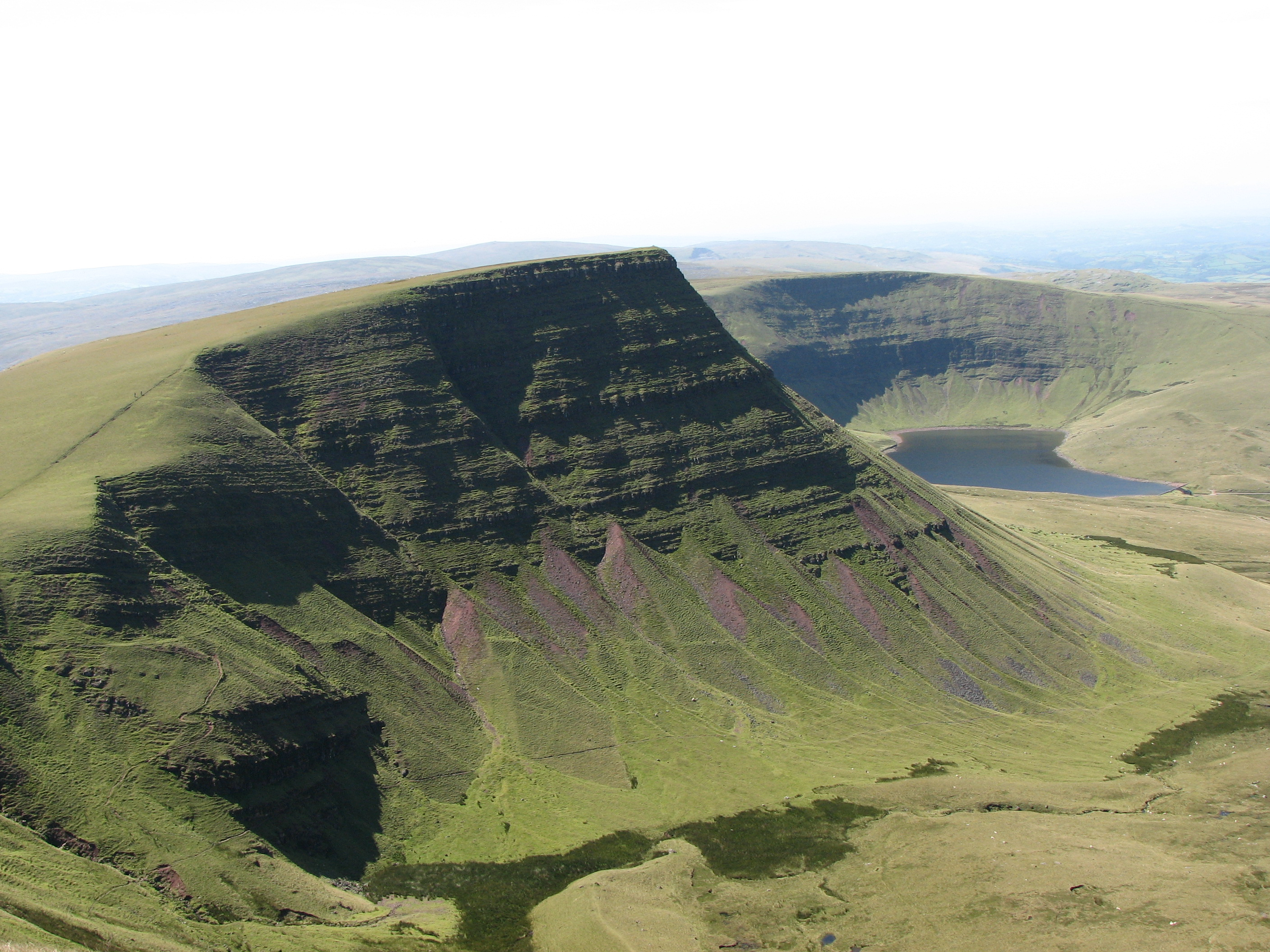
Llyn y Fan Fach with Picws Du in the foreground

Its major tributaries are the Nant Crynfe, Afon Llechach on its right bank and the Afon Meilwch, Afon Clydach and Sawdde Fechan on its left bank.

The river is closely followed by the A4069 road for several kilometres southeast road from Llangadog, not least where the river enters the wooded gorge section between Rhyd-y-saint and Pont Newydd. Almost continuous exposures of a Devonian and Silurian rock sequence occur in the bed and sides of the river in this part of its course and have resulted in its designation as a geological site of special scientific interest.

The name of the river may derive from the Welsh word 'sawdd' meaning 'sinking' though equally it may be from a personal name. Its tributary the Clydach is one of several rivers bearing this name in South Wales and thought to derive from an earlier Celtic word 'klou' or 'kleu' together with the suffix '-ach' which is of Irish origin. The sense is of a 'strong-flowing', 'washing' or stony river.
