= Crug Mawr =

Hill (550m) in Powys, Wales

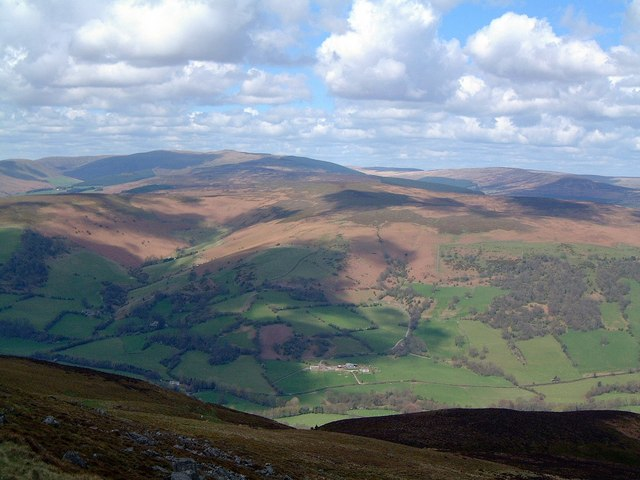
- Crug Mawr viewed from the Sugar Loaf

Highest point
- Elevation: 550 m (1,800 ft)
- Prominence: 28 m (92 ft)
- Coordinates: 51.8977°N 3.0736°W

Geography
- Location: Powys, Wales
- Parent range: Black Mountains
- OS grid: SO262226

Crug Mawr is a hill in the Black Mountains in the Brecon Beacons National Park in southern Powys, Wales. Its summit at a height of 550 m (1,805 ft) is marked by a trig point. The peak sits high above the valleys of the Grwyne Fawr and Grwyne Fechan to the north of the more well-known Sugar Loaf. The views from here across the Black Mountains are wide-ranging and also extend eastwards across Monmouthshire. Four ridges run off to the northwest, east, southeast and southwest, the last ending in the subsidiary summit of Blaen-yr-henbant.

== Access ==
All of the upper slopes of the hill are designated as open country. A bridleway runs up from the minor road east of Llanbedr and then on northwards to Mynydd Du Forest. The Beacons Way runs across the slopes of the hill between Partrishow and Llanbedr.

== Geology ==
In common with other hills in the Black Mountains, Crug Mawr is formed from mudstones and sandstones of the Old Red Sandstone laid down during the Devonian period but there is little rock exposed at the surface other than in the beds of the streams which occupy valleys such as Cwm Milaid and Cwm Beusych.
