= Beacons Way =

99-mile footpath in mid Wales

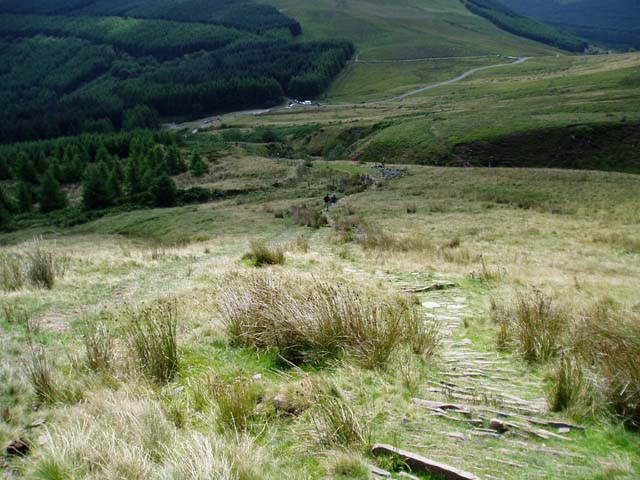
- View south down the Beacons Way at Craig y Fan Ddu
- Length: 99 miles (159 km)
- Location: Brecon Beacons National Park, Wales
- Designation: long distance footpath
- Trailheads: Abergavenny, Monmouthshire; Llangadog, Carmarthenshire
- Use: Hiking

The Beacons Way (Welsh: Ffordd y Bannau) is a waymarked long distance footpath in the Brecon Beacons National Park, Wales. It is a linear route which runs for 99 miles (159 km) east to west through the National Park, and passes many of the most important landmarks and mountain peaks in the mountain range. It also includes a few of the towns in the park as well as popular attractions such as Carreg Cennen Castle near Llandeilo at the western end of the path.

== The route ==
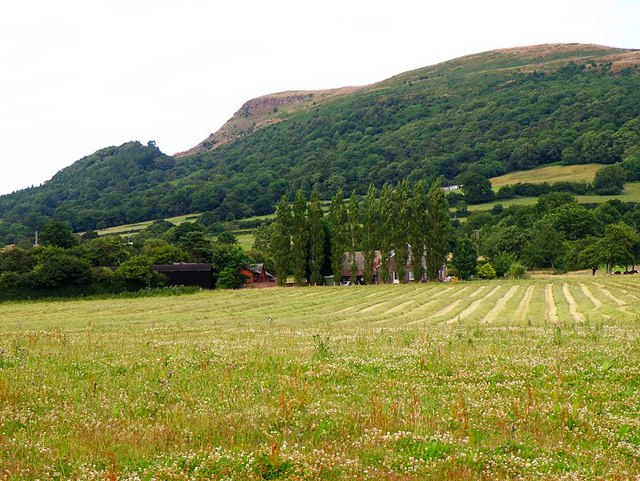
The large landslip at the north end of the Skirrid

=== Black Mountains ===
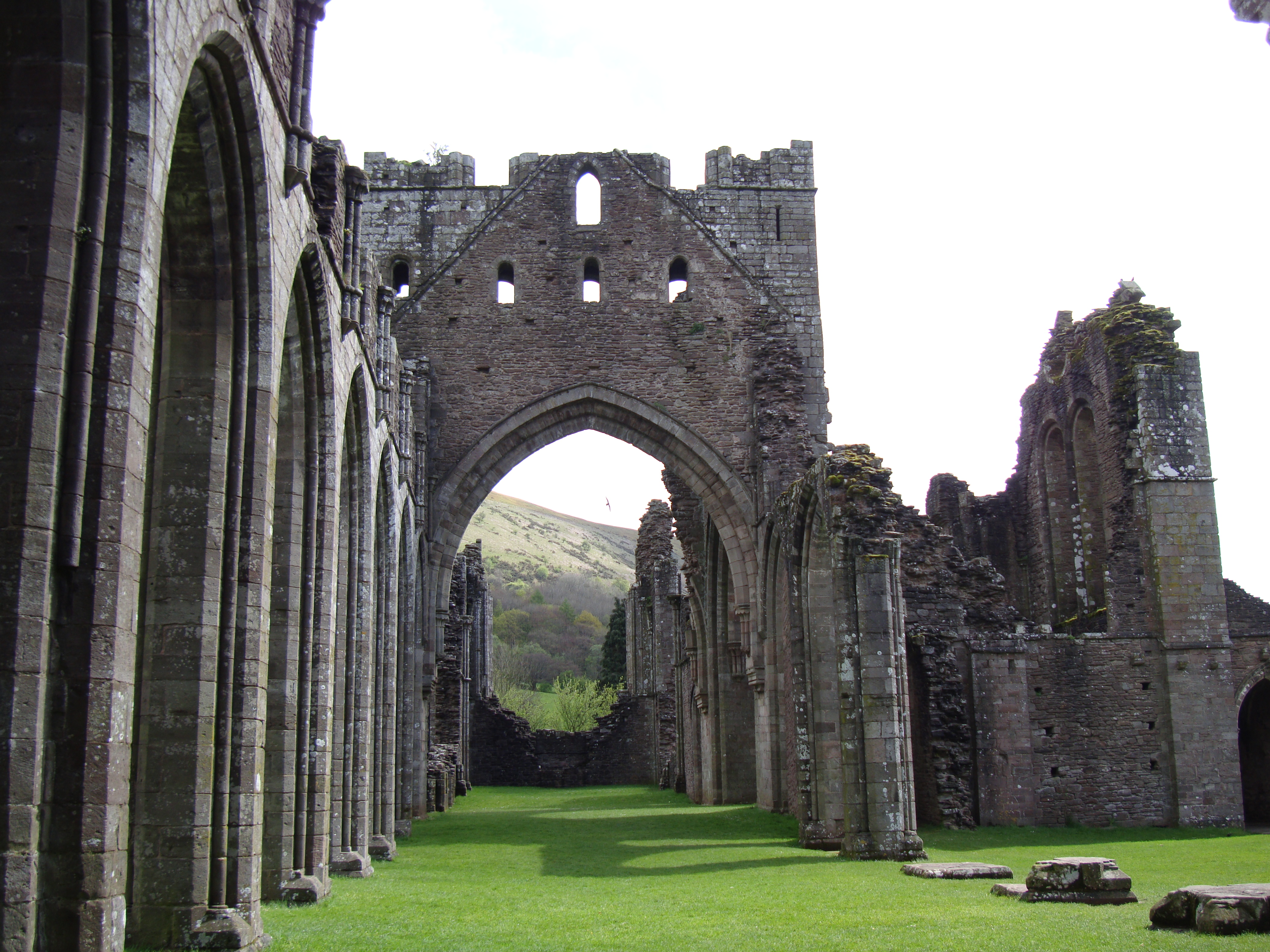
Llanthony Priory tower and nave

The Beacons Way as originally conceived started in Abergavenny, Monmouthshire, at the eastern end of the National Park and headed northeast to Ysgyryd Fawr. It was later changed so that it started on the B4521 road immediately south of the hill at coordinates (51.8422°N 2.9758°W) though the connection with Abergavenny has since been reinstated, albeit on a slightly different route: it now starts at Abergavenny railway station. Beyond Ysgyryd Fawr the route drops down to Llanfihangel Crucorney, passing The Skirrid Mountain Inn before joining the Offa's Dyke Path to climb Hatterrall Hill. It then runs along the Welsh–English border for a few miles before descending into the Vale of Ewyas at Llanthony beside Llanthony Priory.

From Llanthony the route climbs to the ridge below Bal Mawr, follows this south and then makes for the village of Partrishow and over the slopes of Crug Mawr before dropping into the valley of the Grwyne Fechan to the north of Llanbedr. It climbs again to the spectacular Iron Age hillfort of Crug Hywel and then descends to the small town of Crickhowell.

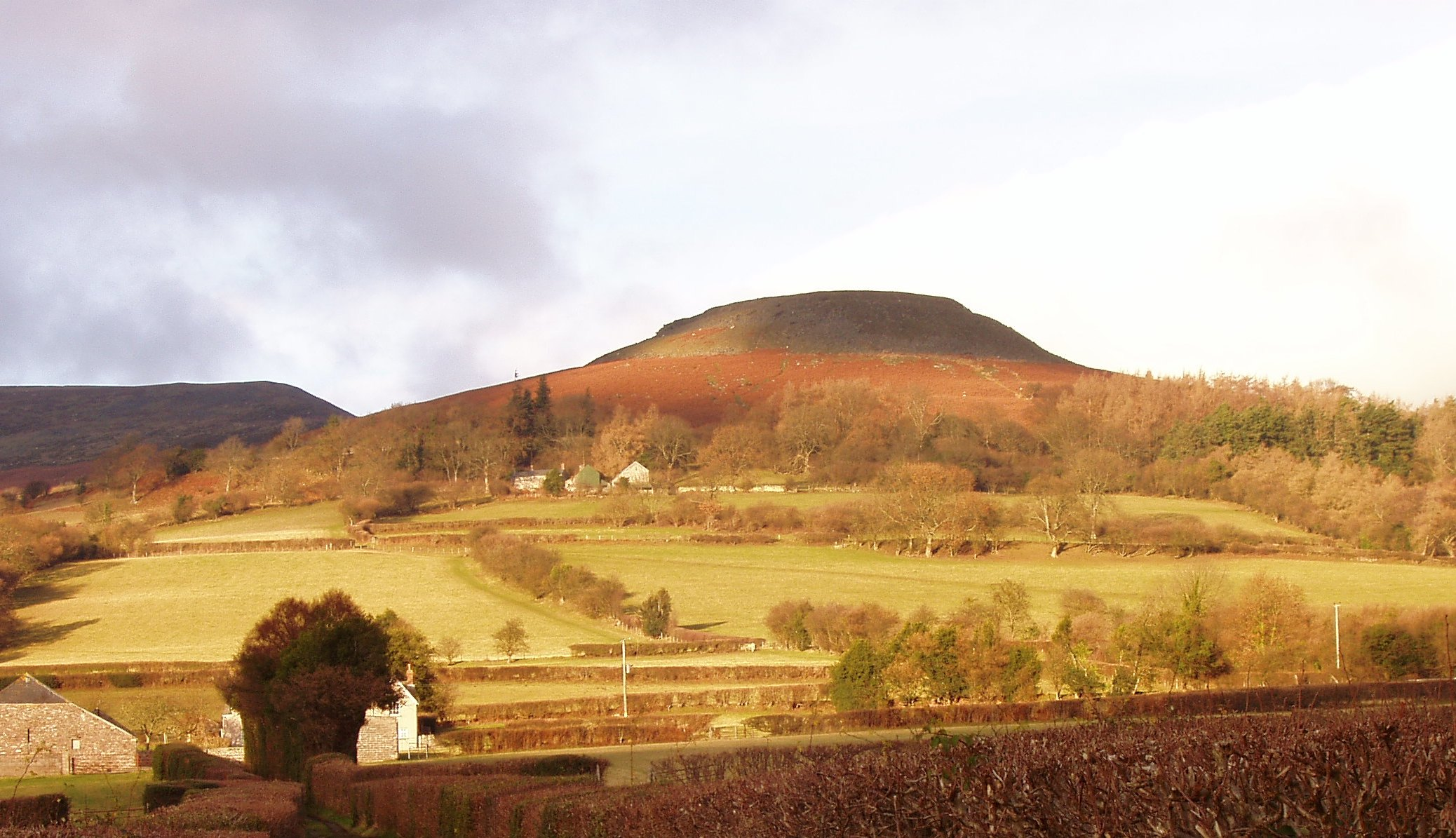
Crug Hywel just north of Crickhowell

=== Pen y Fan ===
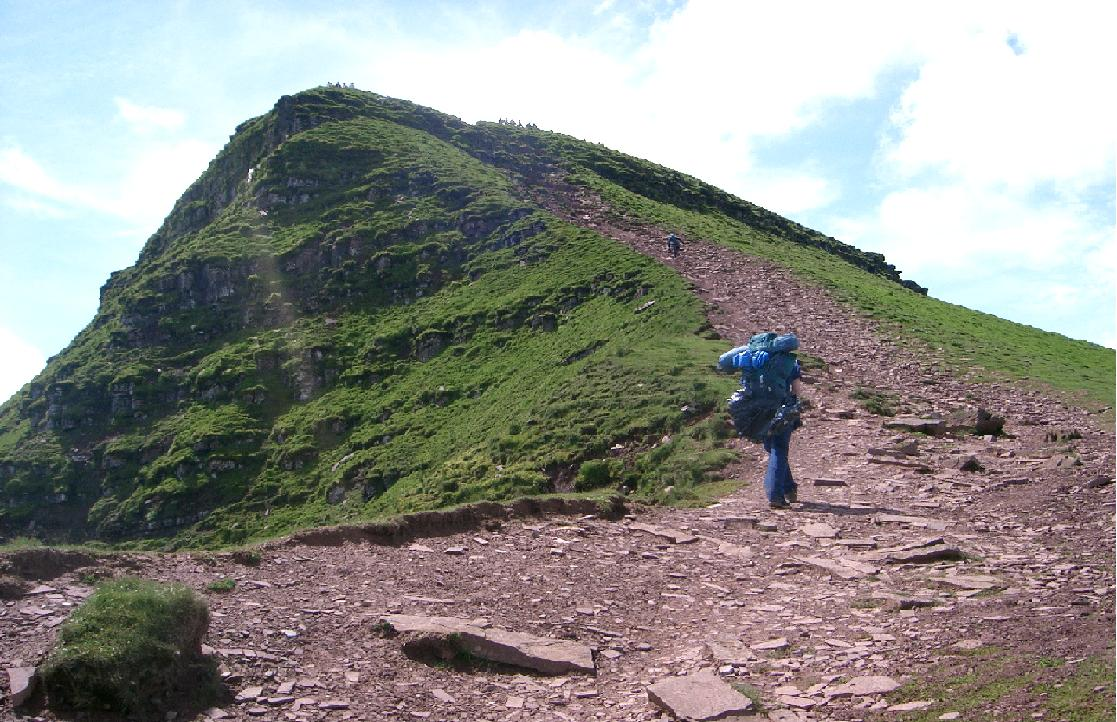
The summit of Pen y Fan

From Crickhowell the Beacons Way skirts the mass of Pen Cerrig-calch to reach Cwmdu in the Rhiangoll valley then heads up onto the southern ridge of Mynydd Llangorse which it then follows southwards to the village of Bwlch. The Way crosses the River Usk to enter Llangynidr and heads up around Tor y Foel making for the head of Glyn Collwn above Talybont Reservoir. The route then crosses the highest peaks in the central Beacons: Pen y Fan and Corn Du. In good weather, the peaks are usually crowded with visitors.

After dropping down to the Storey Arms on the A470 road, it heads northwest to the summit of Craig Cerrig-gleisiad in Fforest Fawr, and then continues southwest over Fan Dringarth and Fan Llia to cross the Afon Llia at Blaen Llia.

=== The Black Mountain Range ===
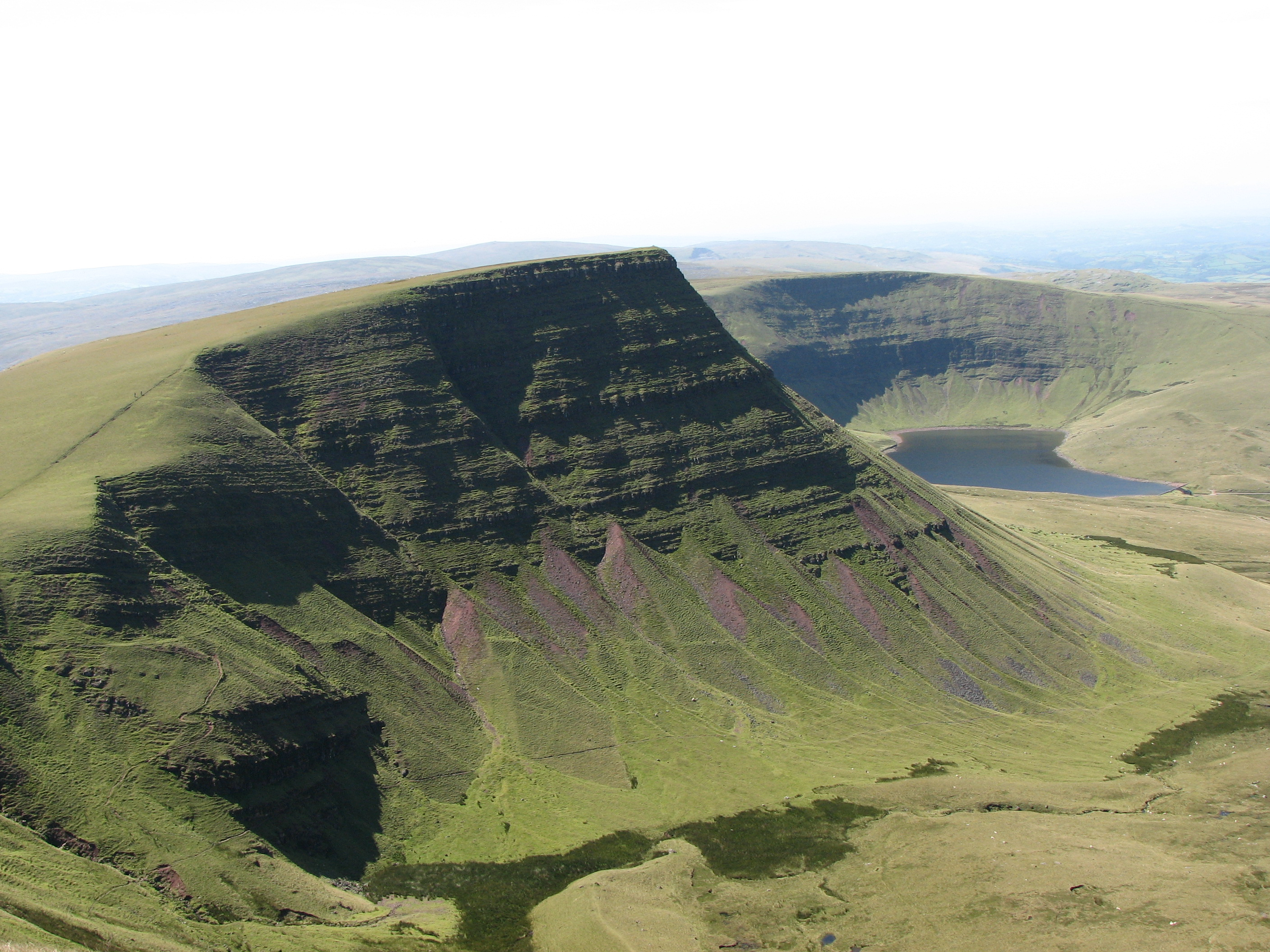
Llyn y Fan Fach lake below Picws Du

The route then follows a section of the Roman road known as Sarn Helen before cutting off west through the Ogof Ffynnon Ddu national nature reserve to Penwyllt. The Beacons Way passes by Craig-y-Nos Castle, once home to Adelina Patti, and up along Fan Hir and Fan Brycheiniog, significant eastern peaks of the Black Mountain rising above Llyn y Fan Fawr, before entering Carmarthenshire. It traverses the three main summits of the Carmarthen Fans, these being Fan Foel, Picws Du and Waun Lefrith, passing above Llyn y Fan Fach before dropping down to Llanddeusant.

A low-level alternative runs beneath the Black Mountain escarpment, east of Llyn y Fan Fawr and north of Llyn y Fan Fach. In the west, the route climbs to Carreg Cennen Castle and Garn Goch. The route originally finished at the railway station at Llangadog but was later modified to stop at the village of Bethlehem (51.9098°N 3.9132°W). The original finish has since been reinstated.

== Completing the walk ==
It is a strenuous walk with plenty of ascents and descents. Parts of the route across open moorland can be difficult to navigate in poor weather - this and the isolation of these sections can make following parts of the route hazardous. The Beacons Way can be walked in its entirety in about 8 days but can take longer depending on deviations and general fitness. There are a few camping sites along the route, and accommodation is available in the towns and villages on or near the route.

== Development of the route ==
The Beacons Way was conceived by the Brecon Beacons Park Society and local walkers, particularly the Society's Secretary John Sansom , Arwel Michael and Chris Barber and was developed as recently as 2005. The alignment has been modified on several occasions, the most recent (as of October 2019) being put in place in spring 2016. The path crosses several peat bogs, where stone pavements have been laid to protect the vegetation and assist walkers.
