= Llyn y Fan Fach =

Lake in south Wales

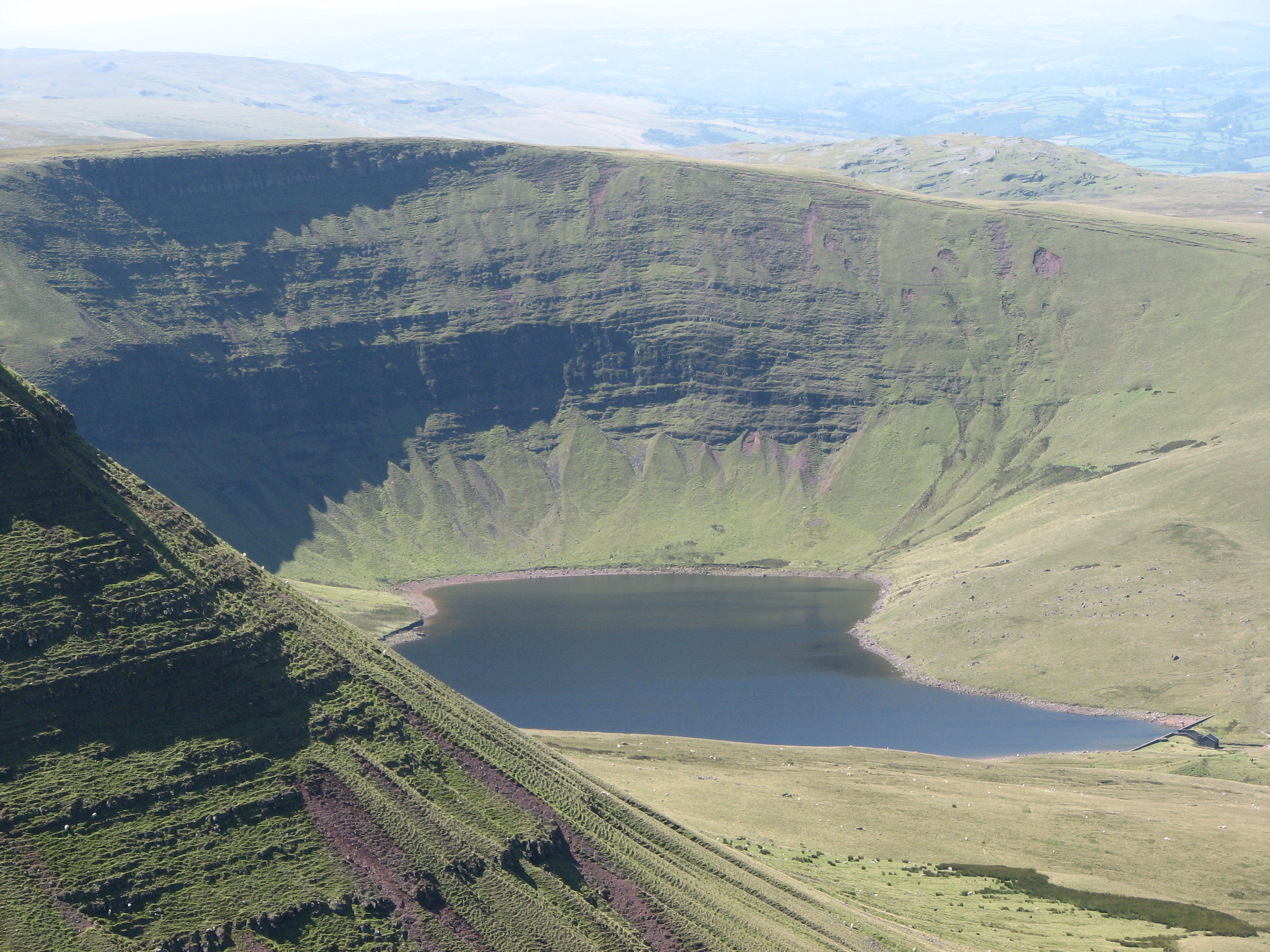

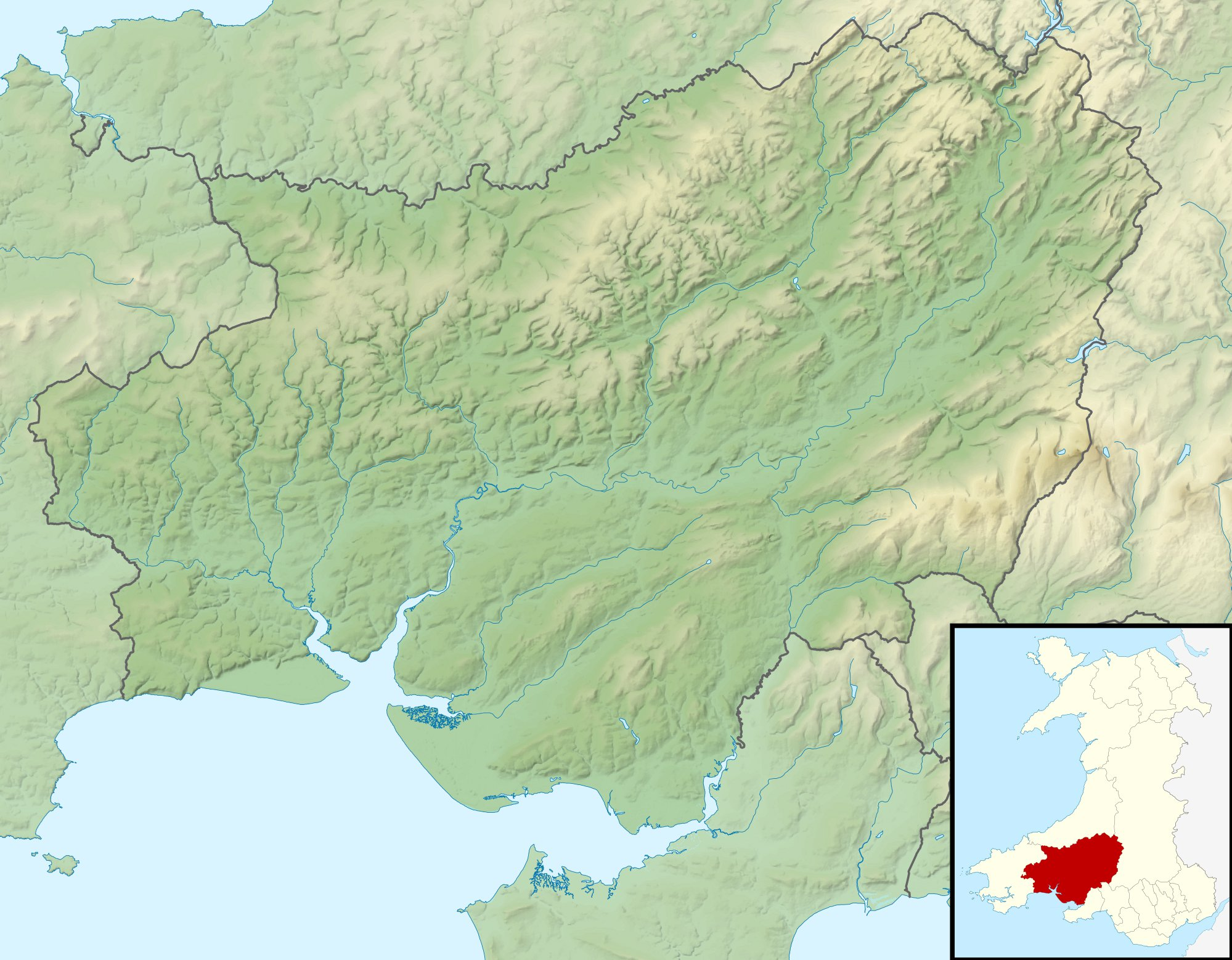
- Location within Carmarthenshire
- Location: Brecon Beacons National Park, Carmarthenshire: View from near Picws Du
- Coordinates: 51°52′55″N 3°44′31″W
- Type: reservoir, natural lake
- Primary outflows: River Sawdde
- Basin countries: United Kingdom
- Max. depth: 29 m (95 ft)
- Surface elevation: 506 m (1,660 ft)

Llyn y Fan Fach (Welsh meaning "little lake of the peak") is a lake of approximately 10 hectares (25 acres) on the northern margin of the Black Mountain in Carmarthenshire, South Wales and lying within the Brecon Beacons National Park. The lake lies at an altitude of approximately 1,660 feet (510 m), immediately to the north of the ridge of the Carmarthen Fans. It is the smaller of two lakes within this mountain massif: the slightly larger Llyn y Fan Fawr is about 2 miles (3.2 km) to the east.

== Geology ==
The lake is overlooked by several prominent mountain peaks, especially Picws Du and Waun Lefrith. Waun Lefrith is formed from the sandstones and mudstones of the Brownstones Formation of the Old Red Sandstone laid down during the Devonian period. Its southern slopes are formed from the hard-wearing sandstones of the overlying Plateau Beds Formation which are of upper/late Devonian age. It is those rocks which form vertical crags along the top edge of the scarp. The northern face of Waun Lefrith was home to a glacier during the ice ages which gouged out the cwm in which Llyn y Fan Fach now sits. This empties via the Afon Sawdde into the River Towy. The southern slopes drain via the Twrch Fechan, the Nant Menyn and Nant Lluestau into the Afon Twrch and so into the River Tawe. Large moraines occur to the east of the summit at the base of the scarp, and below the prominent peak of Picws Du as well as those damming the Lake.

== Legend of Llyn y Fan Fach ==
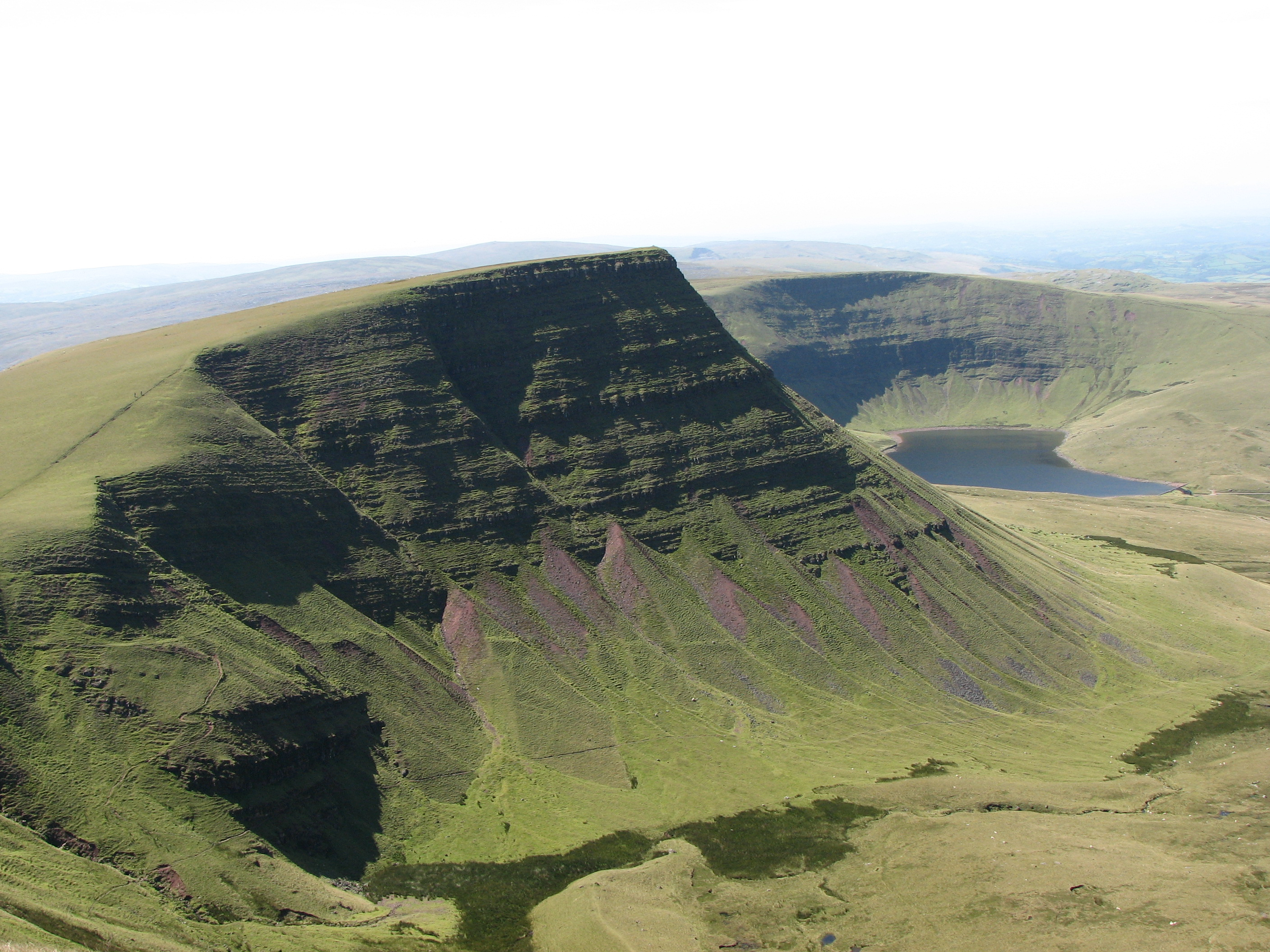
The lake with Picws Du in the foreground

A folklore legend is connected with the lake, known as the Lady of the Lake. In the folk tale, a local young man, son of a widow from Blaen Sawdde (near Llanddeusant) agreed to marry a beautiful girl who arose from the lake, with the condition that he would not hit her three times. He complied easily because the girl was so beautiful, and they were happy for years putting up a house in Esgair Llaethdy near Myddfai, and bringing up a family there. The girl had very special cattle, traditionally still kept at Dinefwr, Llandeilo, and other animals. But over time the man did hit his wife three times. Reasons for why he hit her vary, from the wife laughing at a funeral or crying at a wedding. Regardless, she had to go back to the lake according to the promise, taking the cattle with her. Among the cattle was a team of four oxen which were ploughing at the time. They followed too, plough and all, and, “they say, to this very day you may see a well-marked furrow running right across Myddfai mountain to the edge of Llyn-y-Fan-Fach, which proves this story is true.” But the mother returned sometimes to help and instruct her sons, and in particular one called Rhiwallon (in some versions Rhiwallon is the name of the young man who marries the fairy girl). In due course Rhiwallon and the other sons went to the court of Rhys Gryg of Deheubarth, where they became famous doctors who are known today as the Physicians of Myddfai. A number of their medical formulae remain in the Welsh manuscripts.

== Reservoir ==
The lake was enlarged by the construction of a dam during World War I to provide an additional water supply to Llanelli, the population of which had grown by 34% between 1901 and 1911. Project approval in 1912 was followed by the start of construction two years later. Labour was initially provided by some 175 navvies but harsh working conditions resulted in their departure and replacement with over 150 conscientious objectors who lived in barracks (at the site of the modern car park) and with local families. Filter beds were built halfway down from the reservoir, a facility later used as a fish hatchery. Sand for construction purposes was sourced on the south side of the lake and rafted to the dam site. The works were completed in 1919.

== Access ==
The lake can be reached on foot via the water company's road from the car park at the end of a single track road from Llanddeusant village. The track passes the hatchery about halfway up the hill. At the top of the track is a windowless rescue shelter or bothy by the wall of the dam. Normally unlocked, it contains a fireplace. A path continues to the west up the slope to the escarpment, following the edge of the cliff, reaching the summits of Waun Lefrith and then Picws Du, both of which overlook the lake. There are many deep gullies leading down from the cliff top, and numerous rock outcrops near the top. The Beacons Way follows the ridge down from the summits above the lake, and forms an alternative route onto or off the mountain to the dam road. It arrives in Llanddeusant village more directly, and gives access to the youth hostel in the village.

== Wildlife ==
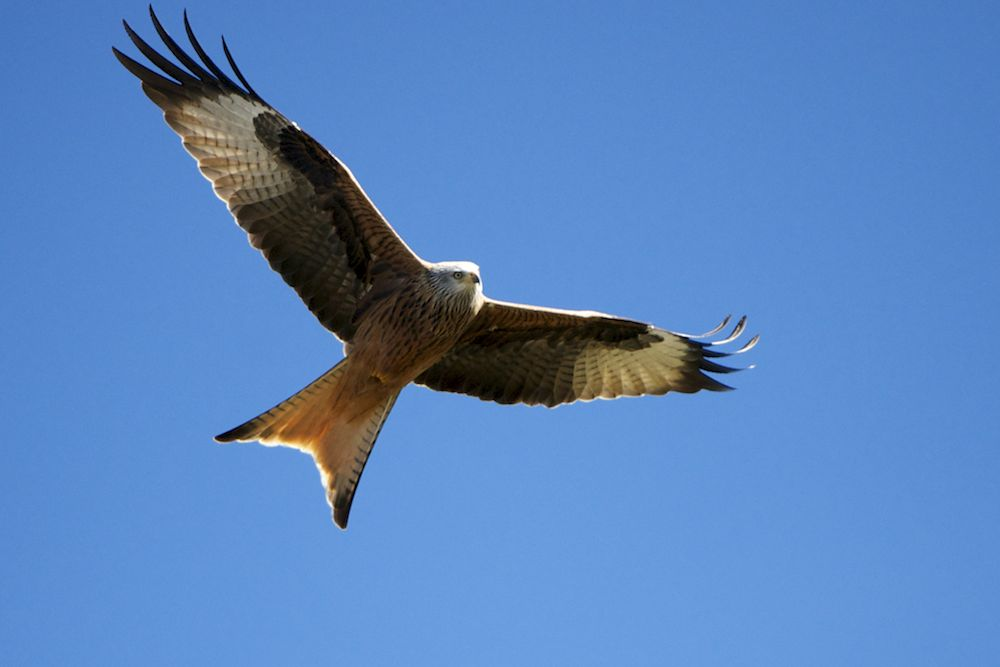
Red kite soaring

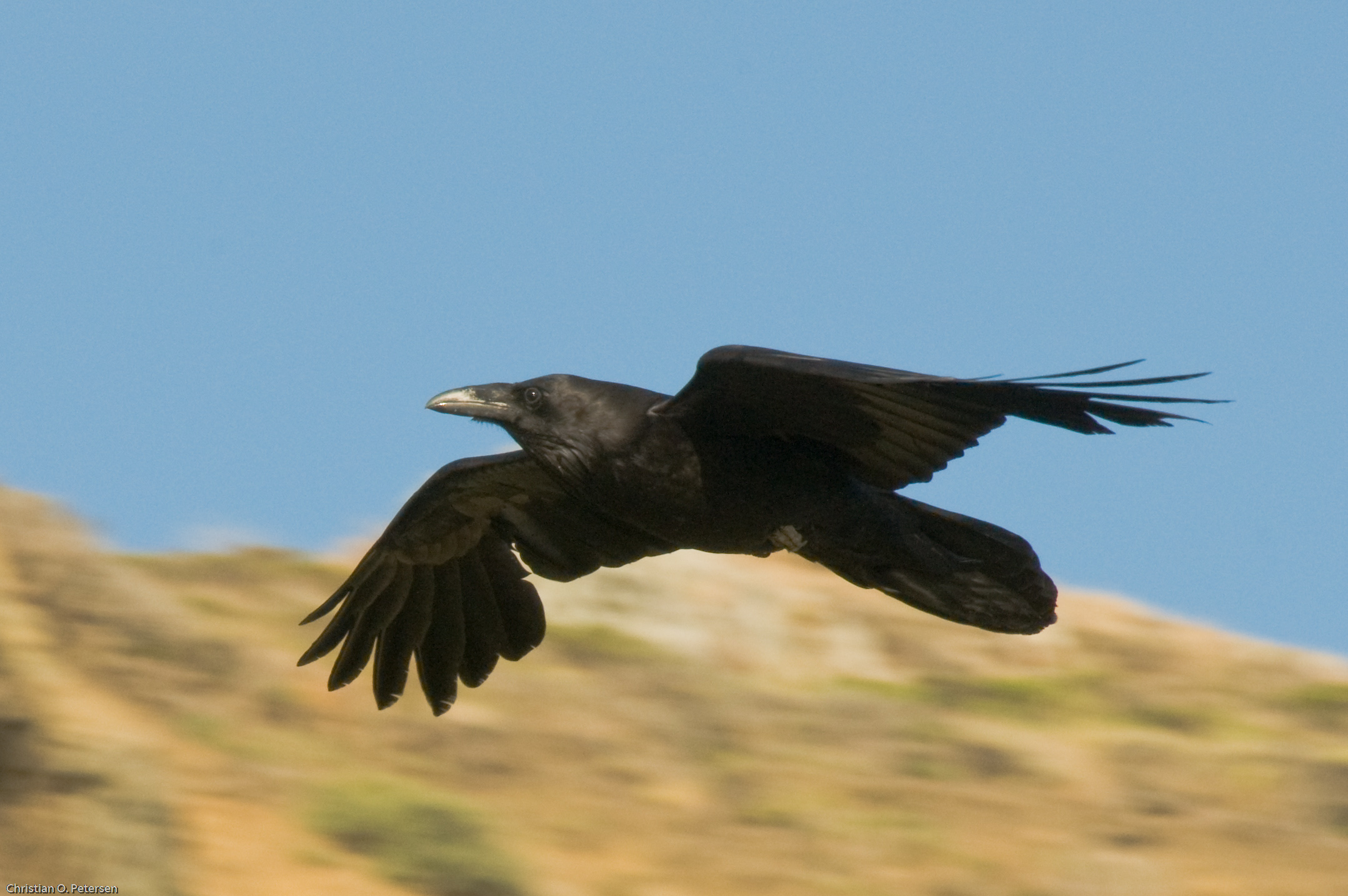
Common raven in flight

There are numerous different species of bird in the area, and they include the red kite, common buzzard, kestrel, carrion crow, common raven and skylark to name a few of the most obvious residents. The former birds can often be found soaring on the updrafts near the cliffs as well as on thermals from the valley below. The red kite was previously restricted to this and adjoining areas in South Wales such as Mynydd Mallaen, mainly as a result of persecution by farmers and gamekeepers, but attitudes have now changed. It was thought that the bird preyed on game birds such as the red grouse, although the evidence showed that they survive mainly on carrion, like many other birds of prey. The kestrel and buzzard are widely distributed, but the raven is restricted to the higher mountains.

There is a wide distribution of mammals such as field voles, foxes and badgers as well as many songbirds. The skylark is plentiful due to the extensive rough pasture present below the main peaks which allows ground nesting of the species. Pied wagtails are common near the streams and torrents running from the hill tops.
