= Llanddeusant, Carmarthenshire =

Village and community in Carmarthenshire, Wales

Llanddeusant
- Community
- Location within Carmarthenshire
- Principal area: Carmarthenshire
- Country: Wales
- Sovereign state: United Kingdom
- Police: Dyfed-Powys
- Fire: Mid and West Wales
- Ambulance: Welsh
- List of places UK Wales Carmarthenshire Map of the community

Llanddeusant is a community in the Black Mountain Range of the Brecon Beacons National Park in Carmarthenshire, Wales. It is about 5 miles southeast of Llangadog.

Llanddeusant lies within the Llansadwrn & Llangadog / Myddfai & Llanddeusant ward, which had a population of 2,412 at census 2001. The boundaries were changed and most of the population was shown under the Llangadog community. The remaining population at the 2011 census was 220 only. The name, meaning "church of two saints", is supposed to originate from the fact that Teilo and Saint David are believed to have met there. The 'Old Red Lion Inn' is now a Youth hostel. The community includes the hamlet of Twynllanan.

== Setting ==
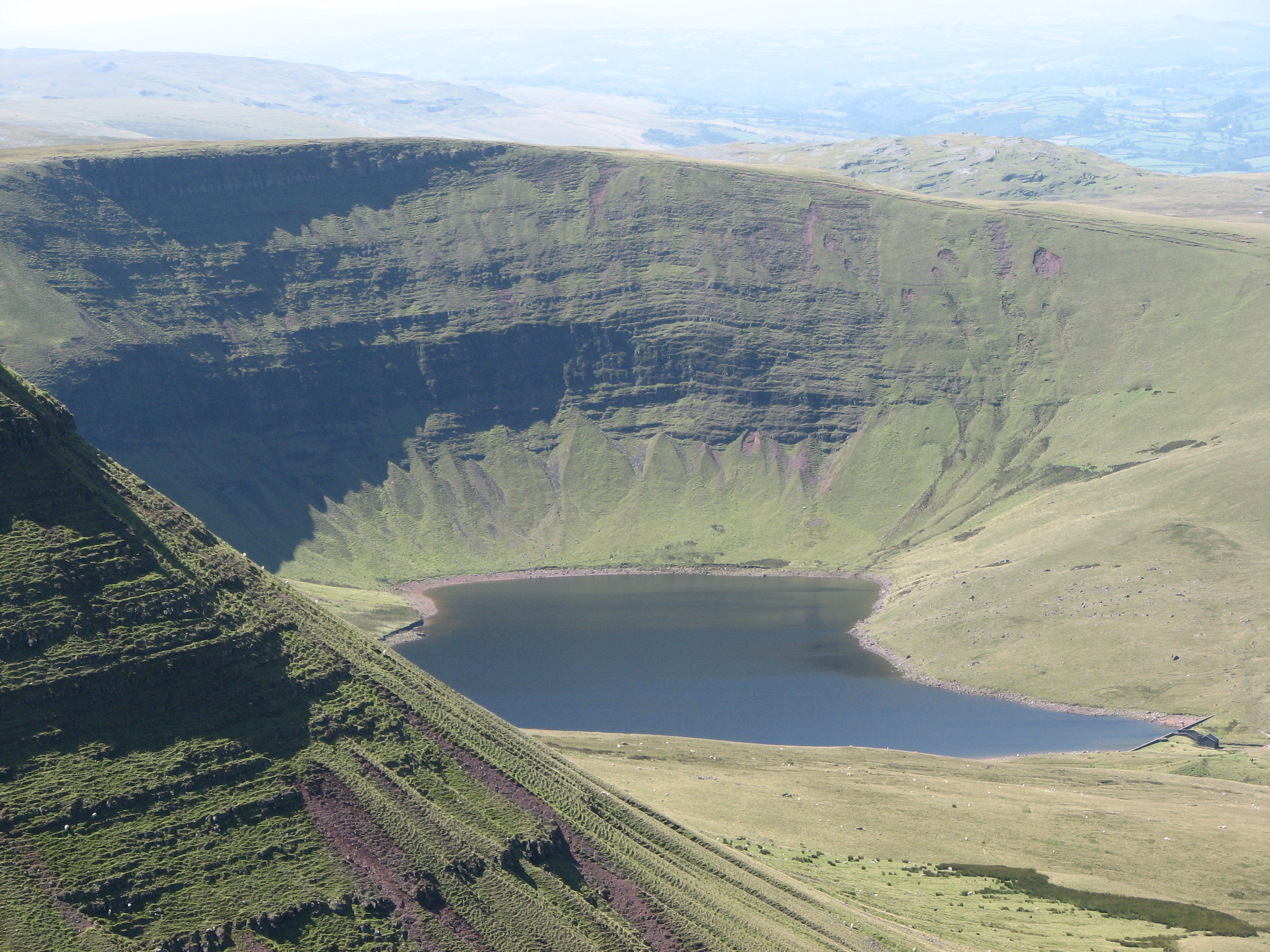
The glacial lake of Llyn y Fan Fach featured in the Lady of the Lake story

The village lies below the prominent north-facing scarp of the Black Mountain and the glacial lake of Llyn y Fan Fach. The lake is the setting of a famous folk tale known as The Lady of the Lake.

== Beacons Way ==
The Beacons Way runs through Llanddeusant. In the west, the route climbs to Carreg Cennen Castle and Garn Goch. The route finishes at the railway station at Llangadog having formerly stopped at the village of Bethlehem (51.9098°N 3.9132°W). The community is bordered by the communities of: Quarter Bach; Llangadog; and Myddfai, all being in Carmarthenshire; and by Llywel and Ystradgynlais in Powys.
