= River Towy =

River in west Wales

River Towy River Tywi
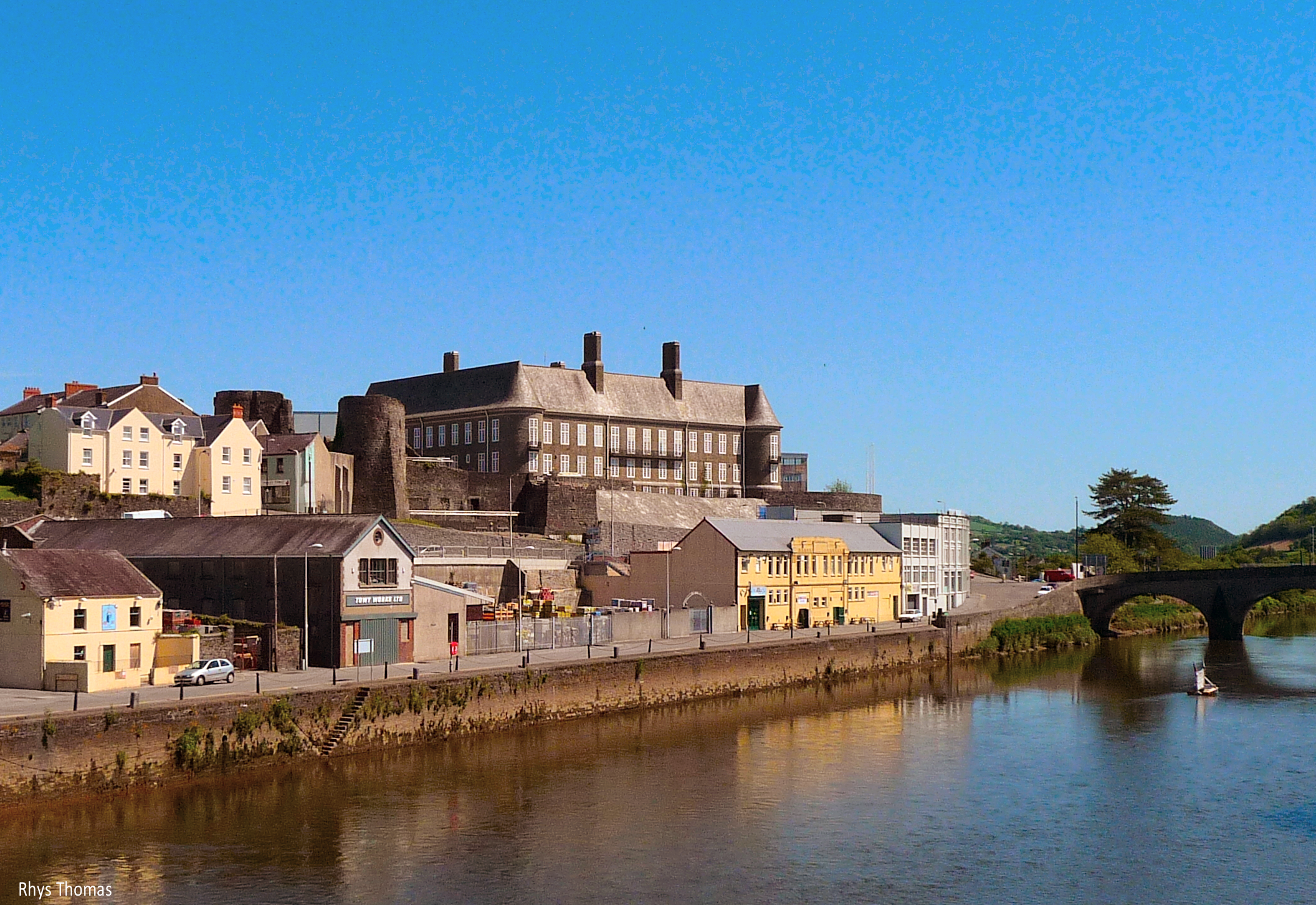
- River Towy at Carmarthen

- Course of the River Towy
- Native name: Afon Tywi (Welsh)

Location
- Cities: Llandovery, Llandeilo, Carmarthen

Physical characteristics
- Source
  - location: Cambrian Mountains (SN802631)
  - coordinates: 52.25299°N 3.75642°W
  - elevation: 488 m (1,601 ft)
- Mouth: Carmarthen Bay
- Length: 120 km (75 mi)
- Basin size: 515 km^{2} (199 sq mi)
- Discharge
  - average: 45 m^{3}/s (1,600 cu ft/s)

Basin features
- Tributaries
  - left: Brân, Sawdde
  - right: Cothi, Gwili

The River Towy, also known as the River Tywi (Welsh: Afon Tywi, IPA: [ˈtəwɪ]), is one of the longest rivers flowing entirely within Wales. Its total length is 120 km (75 mi). It is noted for its sea trout and salmon fishing.

== Route ==
The Towy rises within 15 km (9 mi) of the source of the River Teifi on the lower slopes of Crug Gynan in the Cambrian Mountains. (Note: grid reference SN802631) Flowing through the steep hills of the Tywi Forest, it forms the boundary between Ceredigion and Powys. The river flows generally south-westwards through Carmarthenshire, passing through the towns of Llandovery and Llandeilo.

Its total length is 120 km (75 mi). with numerous tributaries that include the Cothi, Gwili, Brân, and Doethie.

In Carmarthen, it is joined by a substantial tributary, the River Gwili, at Abergwili. The estuary meets Carmarthen Bay east of the Pendine Sands along with the River Taf and both branches of the River Gwendraeth. The estuary was guarded by Llansteffan Castle, a 12th-century Norman castle.

== Damming of the Towy ==
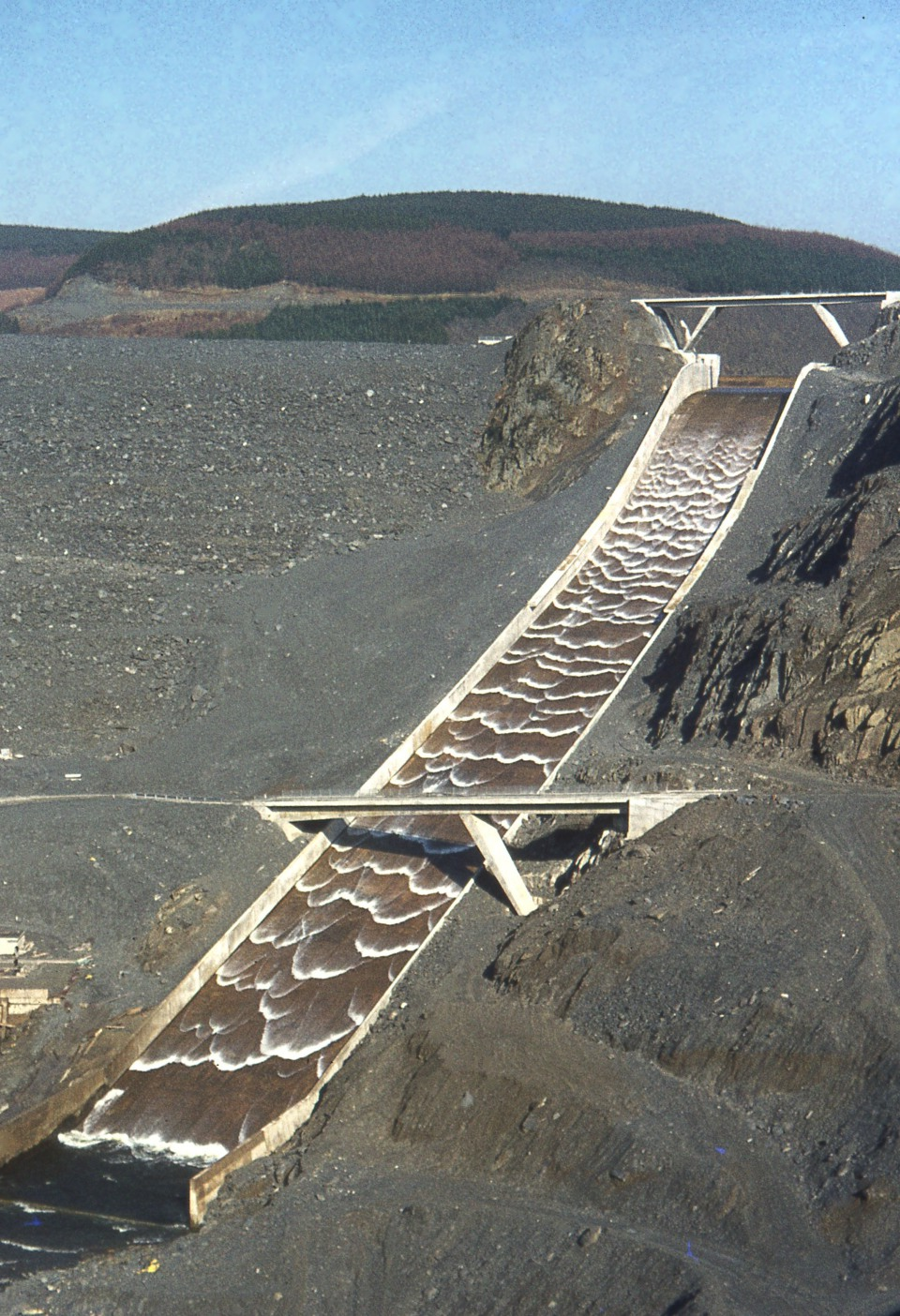
Llyn Brianne spillway soon after first filling

About 10 km (6 mi) from its source, the swift flow of the Towy is interrupted by the Llyn Brianne reservoir, created in 1972 by damming a section of the river to store winter rain for release into the river during dry periods. The reservoir supports the new abstraction at Nantgaredig which supplies a large swathe of south-east Wales with drinking water. The flow in the River Towy would have been unable to sustain such an abstraction were it not for the release of water from the upland reservoir.

== Ecology ==
=== Fish ===
The Towy is a national draw for big sea trout (local name sewin), the seagoing form of the brown trout, Salmo trutta. These fish enter the river each spring and early summer to breed in the tributaries. The river is thought to produce more double-figure (10 lbs plus, or about 5 kg or more) sea trout than any other in Britain. Anglers and estuary netsmen have taken these fish to over 20 pounds (9 kg) in weight. In summer and autumn there is also a substantial run of Atlantic salmon (Salmo salar). In May the Towy has a run of the rare and protected twaite shad and allis shad. The Towy also contains brown trout, eels, pike, and a variety of small fish species, and is home to brook lampreys, river lampreys and sea lampreys.

The Towy has the distinction of having accidentally produced by far the biggest fish ever taken on rod and line in fresh water in Britain. This was a sturgeon (Acipwienser sturio) weighing 388 lb (176 kg) and nine feet two inches (2.79 m) in length which was caught in the river near Nantgaredig by Alec Allen on 28 July 1932. (Note: Its photograph can be seen in the Cresselly Arms at Pontargothi on the A40.) The last sturgeon in UK waters was seen in the river in 1993.

=== Mammals ===
The Towy has a thriving population of otters, as well as many commoner mammal species. Grey seals are common in the lower reaches and sometimes penetrate several miles up river in pursuit of sea trout and salmon.

=== Birds ===
The Towy and surrounding valley (Welsh: Dyffryn Tywi) are home to a very large variety of water and wetland birds. Among the more distinctive species found along the river are sand martins, common sandpipers, little ringed plovers, dippers, kingfishers and grey wagtails. Red kites and buzzards are numerous. Goosanders and cormorants prey on sea trout and salmon.

=== Plants ===
The prevalence of oxbow lakes in the Towy valley provides some spectacular shows through the year. In summer at Bishop's Pond in Abergwili (an oxbow lake formed when the river flooded in 1802) there is a spectacular show of yellow water lilies on the pond when the water level drops and reed sweet-grass fringes the edges – a species also found nearby in the Teifi valley further west in Pembrokeshire, in Gower, in Powys (especially along the Montgomery Canal), on Anglesey and in several sites along the North Wales coast.

== Glanrhyd Bridge disaster ==
On 19 October 1987, three days after the Great Storm of 1987, four people were killed when a train plunged off Glanrhyd Bridge near Llangadog into the flooded river.
