= Llangadog =

Village and community in Carmarthenshire, Wales

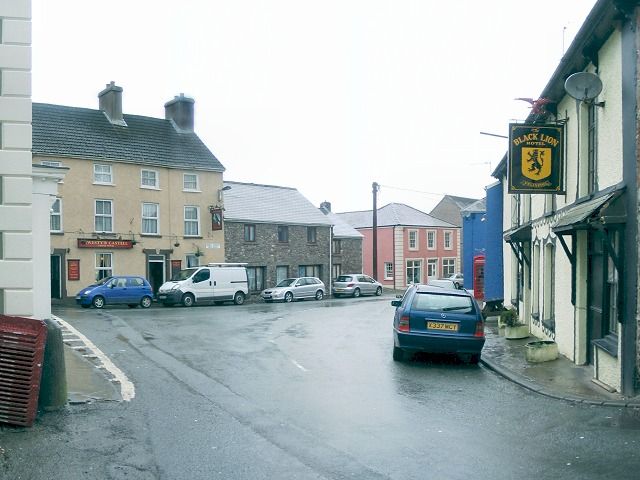
- Llangadog village

- Location within Carmarthenshire
- Population: 1,311 (2011)
- OS grid reference: SN704285
- Community: Llangadog
- Principal area: Carmarthenshire
- Preserved county: Dyfed
- Country: Wales
- Sovereign state: United Kingdom
- Post town: LLANDEILO
- Postcode district: SA19
- Post town: LLANGADOG
- Postcode district: SA19
- Dialling code: 01550
- Police: Dyfed-Powys
- Fire: Mid and West Wales
- Ambulance: Welsh
- UK Parliament: Caerfyrddin
- Senedd Cymru – Welsh Parliament: Carmarthen East and Dinefwr
- List of places UK Wales Carmarthenshire 51°56′17″N 3°52′59″W Map of the community

Llangadog (Welsh pronunciation) is a village and community in Carmarthenshire, Wales, which also includes the villages of Bethlehem and Capel Gwynfe. A notable local landscape feature is Y Garn Goch with two Iron Age hill forts.

Llangadog was the administrative centre of the commote of Perfedd and had a castle, destroyed in 1204. Although the borough declined in the Middle Ages, Llangadog retained its market, which was frequented by drovers into the 19th century.

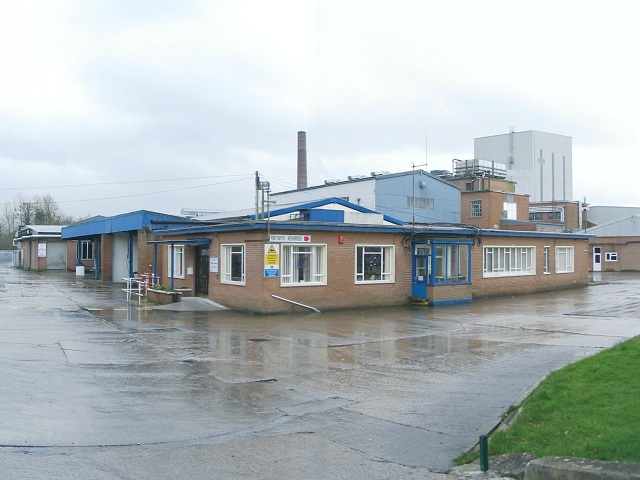
Former CWS/MMB creamery at Llangadog, now a pet food factory

The railway station on the Heart of Wales Line provides regular train services via Transport for Wales Rail. The station had a siding for accessing the Co-op Wholesale Society creamery, allowing milk trains to access the site. After railway access was ceased in the late 1970s, the creamery continued to operate until 2005, when it closed with the loss of 200 jobs. The site has since been redeveloped as a pet food factory.

== St Cadog's Church ==
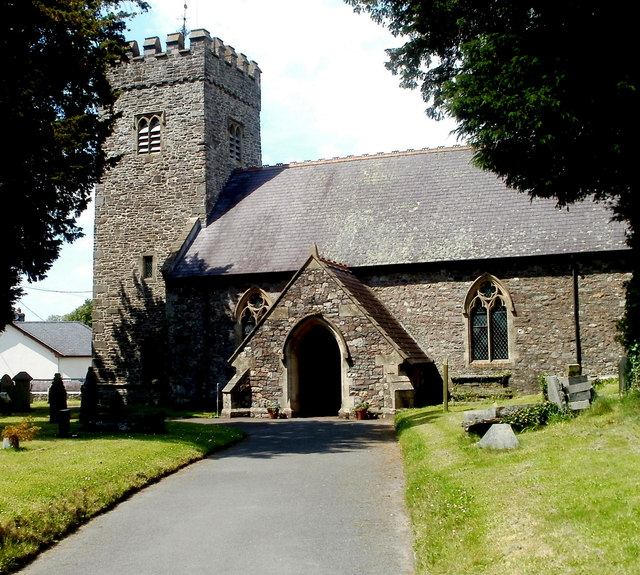
St Cadog's Church

The Church in Wales parish church of Saint Cadoc (from whom the name of the village derives) is of medieval origin and was extensively restored in 1889. The tower is fourteenth century.

== Governance ==
An electoral ward with the same name exists. This ward stretches beyond the confines of Llangadog community. The total ward population taken at the 2011 census was 1,929.

The community is bordered by the communities of: Myddfai; Llanddeusant; Quarter Bach; Dyffryn Cennen; Manordeilo and Salem; and Llansadwrn, all being in Carmarthenshire.

== Welsh language ==
According to the 2011 Census, 58.1% of the community's residents aged three and above can speak Welsh, with 86.3% of 3-15 year olds being able to speak the language.

According to the latest Estyn inspection report of the local primary school, Ysgol Gynradd Llangadog, 42% of statutory school ages pupils came from Welsh-speaking households.
