= Geology of Wales =

Geological map of Wales. Silurian rock is shown in pale green, Ordovician rock in darker green, carboniferous in grey. Other rock formations are also included in the table on the left of the image.

The geology of Wales is complex and varied; its study has been of considerable historical significance in the development of geology as a science. All geological periods from the Cryogenian (late Precambrian) to the Jurassic are represented at outcrop, whilst younger sedimentary rocks occur beneath the seas immediately off the Welsh coast. The effects of two mountain-building episodes have left their mark in the faulting and folding of much of the Palaeozoic rock sequence. Superficial deposits and landforms created during the present Quaternary period by water and ice are also plentiful and contribute to a remarkably diverse landscape of mountains, hills and coastal plains.

Wales's modern character derives in substantial part from the exploitation of its diverse mineral wealth; slate in Snowdonia, coal in the South Wales Valleys and metal ores in Anglesey and mid Wales, to name but three. Wales's geology influences farming practices and building stone choices but also planning of developments which must take into account ground stability and liability to flooding - geohazards which an appreciation of the geology can help deal with.

== History of geological study ==
1948 Geological survey map of Wales (and part of England).

South Wales has a written record of geological interest going back to the 12th century when Giraldus Cambrensis noted pyritous shales near Newport. George Owen in 1603 correctly identified the stratigraphic relationship between the Carboniferous Limestone and the Coal Measures. Some of the first published representations of fossils were those of fossil plants taken from the coal measures near Neath (Gibson late 17th century).

In the mid-19th century, two prominent geologists, Roderick Murchison and Adam Sedgwick used their studies of the geology of Wales to establish certain principles of stratigraphy and palaeontology. They did fundamental work on the Old Red Sandstone but are remembered more for their work on the lower Palaeozoic sequence. It was Sedgwick who established the Cambrian system and Murchison first described the Silurian, naming it for the ancient Silures tribe which occupied mid Wales. An overlap between the two systems as mapped led eventually to protracted dispute between the two erstwhile collaborators. After their deaths, Charles Lapworth erected the Ordovician system (again named for an ancient tribe of northwest Wales, the Ordovices), to account for the sequence of rocks at the heart of the controversy.

More recently two locations in mid Wales have been selected to globally define stages of the Silurian period. Cefn-cerig Road near Cefn-cerig Farm, Llandovery, is the location of the Global Boundary Stratotype Section and Point (GSSP) which marks the boundary between the Aeronian and Telychian stages of the Silurian period on the geologic time scale. Similarly Trefawr Track, a forestry road north of Cwm-coed-aeron Farm, Llandovery, is the location of the GSSP marking the boundary between the Rhuddanian and Aeronian stages. Both GSSPs were ratified in 1984. :See main articles on Cefn-cerig Road and Trefawr Track.

== Precambrian ==
Late Precambrian rocks are widespread on Anglesey, Llŷn and Arfon with other, more restricted occurrences in north Pembrokeshire, Radnorshire and Carmarthenshire. The often intensive metamorphism which these originally volcanic and sedimentary rocks have been subjected to and their generally faulted relationship to neighbouring rocks has meant that geologists' understanding of them has been limited. The majority lie on or close to the margins of terranes, blocks of the Earth's crust which have had differing geological histories before assuming their present configuration. However, in recent years there has been a progressive elucidation of the way in which Wales's many terranes came together during the late Precambrian and the Palaeozoic era.

The Stanner-Hanter Complex on the English border comprises volcanic rocks around 700 million years old which puts them within the Cryogenian period.

Rocks found in a quarry near to the village Llangynog, Carmarthenshire, in 1977 contain some of the Earth's oldest fossils which date from the Ediacaran period, 564 million years ago, when Wales was part of the micro-continent Avalonia.

== Palaeozoic ==
=== Cambrian ===
Rocks of Cambrian age occur most extensively in an inlier in Merionethshire where the up-arched rocks of the Harlech Dome form the Rhinogydd. The Harlech Grits Group comprises sandstones, mudstones and greywackes forms the eroded core of the dome and within this sequence it is specifically the greywackes of the 'Rhinog Formation' which provides the higher hills. Cambrian rocks are also to be found in north Pembrokeshire, Anglesey and Llŷn.

=== Ordovician ===
The Ordovician period gave rise to a sequence of sedimentary rocks which stretch from Pembrokeshire eastwards through Carmarthenshire up the Vale of Towy and which are intricately intermixed with those of the succeeding period northwards to the Vale of Conwy. In Snowdonia many Ordovician volcanic rocks give rise to a more rugged landscape than elsewhere in the country. Snowdon itself is largely formed of volcanic ash (tuff) with some sedimentary rock and igneous intrusions folded into a syncline. Cadair Idris is also largely formed of Ordovician igneous rocks. Anglesey and Llŷn are also Ordovician territory. The Ordovician rocks of Wales are typically intensely faulted and folded, having been affected by the earth movements of the Caledonian Orogeny. A notable feature of the Ordovician system is a major downwarp known as the Welsh geosyncline.

=== Silurian ===
Rocks dating from the Silurian period are, by one measure, the most significant for Wales's landscape; a greater percentage of the country's land area is directly underlain by rocks of this age than any other. Much of central Wales is formed in Silurian sandstones and mudstones as is the more gentle landscape of central Monmouthshire where the Usk Anticline gives rise to the Usk Inlier. In the north it is the Ludlow age mudstones and sandstones of the Elwy and Nantglyn Formations which form the Clwydian Range, and the Nantglyn Flags and Wenlockian Denbigh Grits which form the Denbigh Moors, Llantysilio Mountain and the Dee Valley around Llangollen. In west Wales, parts of south and central Pembrokeshire around Haverfordwest and Narberth and between Marloes and Daugleddau are formed by Llandovery aged mudstones, sandstones and conglomerates.

==== The Caledonian orogeny ====
A long and complex series of continental collisions known collectively as the Caledonian orogeny began in the Ordovician and continued through the Silurian into Devonian times. The effect in this area was to cause folding and faulting of the existing rock sequence, most particularly within the Welsh Basin, a process which intensified northwards. Parts of the sequence were subjected to low grade metamorphism, the most significant of which, from an economic point of view, would be the Cambrian and Ordovician slates of North Wales. The northeast to southwest 'grain' of much of the country was imparted at this time with a series of major fault zones persisting from that time to the present, some of which, particularly in the northwest, are believed to represent terrane boundaries. The siliciclastic deposits of the succeeding Devonian period represent in large part the rapid attrition of the extensive Caledonian Mountain belt created by the Caledonian collision.

=== Devonian ===
Devonian age rocks are broadly synonymous with the Old Red Sandstone (commonly referred to as ‘the ORS’) though the lowermost ORS is late Silurian in age. The Anglo-Welsh Basin which stretches from the border with England westwards through the Brecon Beacons National Park into Pembrokeshire includes the larger part of this sequence. It is the sandstones and mudstones of the Lower Devonian Brownstones and Senni Formations, sometimes capped by the hard wearing sandstones of the Plateau Beds which form such striking peaks as Pen y Fan and Sugar Loaf and the dramatic scarps of the Black Mountains and Black Mountain. There are restricted occurrences of Devonian rocks on Anglesey too.

=== Carboniferous ===
The Carboniferous period is represented by extensive outcrops across South Wales from the Wye Valley in the east, through the South Wales Coalfield, the Vale of Glamorgan and Gower westwards to southern Pembrokeshire. There are less extensive areas in northeast Wales and along the north coast into Anglesey where similarly aged rocks characterize the landscape. The sequence includes Carboniferous Limestone at its base, followed by coarse sandstones (The ‘Millstone Grit’ of the north and the ‘Twrch Sandstone’ of the south), then mudstones and finally the Coal Measures which comprise a thick succession of mudstones, sandstones and of course coal seams.

==== Limestone ====
Though mid Wales lay above sea level during Carboniferous times, shallow tropical seas extended across much of north and south Wales and it was in these environments that a succession of types of limestone were deposited.

The limestone gives rise to impressive cliffed landscapes both on the coast as at the Great Orme in the north and at St Govan's Head and the Gower Peninsula in the south, and inland at the escarpments of Eglwyseg Mountain near Llangollen and Llangattock hillside in the Usk Valley. Karst landscapes characterize the limestone outcrop and, particularly along the ‘north crop’ of the South Wales Coalfield basin, where the limestone is shallowly buried beneath adjacent sandstones, extensive development of solution hollows has taken place.

==== Namurian sequence ====
The Namurian age mudstones and sandstones which overlie/succeed the limestone give rise to rugged landscapes; typically either poorly drained moorland or else wooded gorges as in the Waterfall Country of southern Powys.

==== Coal Measures ====
Landscapes developed over Coal Measures rocks are extensively altered by humans, as the coal and iron found within this thick sequence of rocks have long been economically important, particularly since the Industrial Revolution. The former coalfields of Flintshire, Denbighshire and South Wales are witness to this period. In South Wales, the Coal Measures are overlain by the thick sandstones of the Pennant Measures which often provides craggy edges to the plateau which has been deeply dissected to form the South Wales Valleys. The Pennant Sandstone is widely used as a building stone.

A major geological feature of the Upper Carboniferous sub-period in South Wales is the South Wales Coalfield syncline. The rocks comprising this important area were laid down during the Westphalian Age approximately 314-308 million years ago (Ma), when climatic conditions were equatorial. This Westphalian succession includes a sequence with a thickness of more than 1800 m in the west. The Coal Measures were laid down on a low-lying waterlogged plain with peat mires immediately south of an ancient geological feature known as the Wales-London-Brabant High.

==== Variscan Orogeny ====
From late Carboniferous times, through the Permian, South Wales lay on the northern margin of the Variscan orogen, an area affected by a complex continental collision taking place to the south. The most intensely affected rocks are those of south and central Pembrokeshire where steeply dipping and vertical strata are commonplace and multiple folding, faulting and overthrusting are well seen in coastal sections. Southern Carmarthenshire and the western part of the South Wales Coalfield were affected to a lesser extent. Old Caledonoid weaknesses such as the Neath Disturbance were reactivated at this time.

=== Permian ===
Rocks dating from the Permian period occur in North Wales underlying the Vale of Clwyd and extend into the northeastern fringes of the country from the larger bodies of such rock in Cheshire and Shropshire. The Permo-Triassic rocks in the northeast of Wales are largely concealed by recent material deposited by rivers and the Devensian icesheet. Thicker sequences of Permo-Triassic rock are known to underlie the Bristol Channel, Cardigan Bay and the Irish Sea off the North Wales coast.

== Mesozoic ==
=== Triassic ===
Triassic sandstones form much of the coast between Barry and Penarth and extend eastwards along the Monmouthshire coast to the English border at Chepstow. They also occur more sporadically further west between Ogmore-by-Sea and Kenfig. There are very localized occurrences of Triassic material in Gower and south Pembrokeshire, much of it breccia-fill of fissures in underlying Carboniferous Limestone. Triassic sandstones are also found along the border with Cheshire and Shropshire, though most often concealed beneath recent fluvial and glacially derived material.

=== Jurassic ===
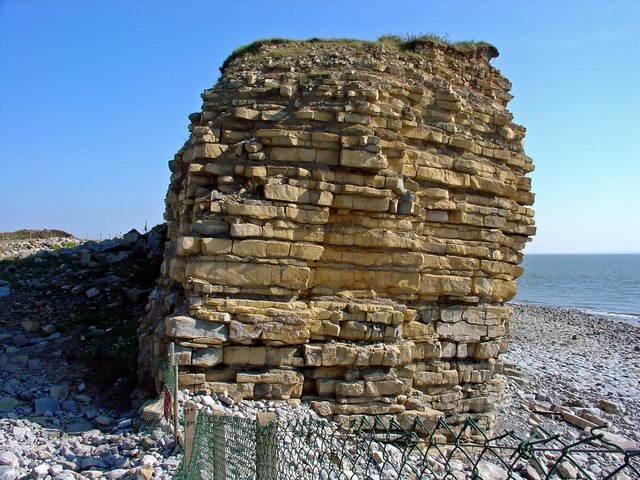
Layers of Blue Lias rocks at Rhoose Point, Vale of Glamorgan

Rocks dating from the Jurassic period occur widely across the Vale of Glamorgan. Much of the Glamorgan coast between Ogmore-by-Sea and Barry is formed by cliffs of layered Jurassic limestone known as the Lias. Extensive and spectacular shore platforms have been developed e.g. near Southerndown, as these cliffs have retreated inland through frequent rockfall.

=== Cretaceous ===
There are no rocks of Cretaceous age in Wales but they are known to be present within the sub-sea basins off the Welsh coast e.g. Celtic Sea and the Bristol Channel.

== Cenozoic ==
=== Palaeogene and Neogene ===
There is scant evidence for rocks of the Palaeogene and Neogene periods in Wales though they are known to occur offshore. The exceptions are the sequence revealed in the Mochras borehole on the coastal strip south of Harlech and the 'pocket deposits' where sediments fill depressions in the Carboniferous Limestone in northeast Wales. In the south, poorly cemented sands occur sporadically in the central and western part of the Brecon Beacons National Park; these are thought to be a product of the Cenozoic weathering of the underlying Twrch Sandstone.

== Quaternary ==
The landscape of Wales has assumed its present shape over the last 2.6 million years i.e. during the Quaternary period which reaches to the present day. Ice sheets and valley glaciers which developed during a series of ice ages have significantly altered a landscape which had developed as rivers drained a tilted upland surface which is thought to have emerged from beneath the sea during earlier Cainozoic times.

=== Glacial legacy ===
The effects of the last (Devensian) ice age are the most readily understood. An ice sheet which at its maximum extent covered virtually all of Wales and reached as far south as Cardiff, Bridgend and Gower left in its wake suites of both erosional and depositional landforms. The glacial cirques of Snowdonia and to a lesser extent of the Cambrian Mountains and the Brecon Beacons are well known. Many pre-existing valleys were further deepened by glacial ice. Cirque moraines in the mountains and terminal and recessional moraines in the major valleys are the most striking depositional legacy of the glaciation. Three substantial medial moraines extend beneath the waters of Cardigan Bay, parts being exposed at low spring tides as Sarn Badrig, Sarn y Bwch and Sarn Cynfelin.

There are too, swarms of drumlins and a widespread plastering of glacial till elsewhere. The greatest concentration of drumlins is in Denbighshire though there are also distinct areas around the Severn valley.

=== Coastal deposits ===
Following the end of the last ice age, sea levels rose to roughly their current levels by around 6000 years ago. Forests which had become established at or below this level were destroyed though the preserved stumps of trees in growth position can still be seen in the intertidal zone in places, as can the remains of peat deposits which again had originally formed above the high-water mark. Redistribution of glacial and fluvial sands has given rise to extensive dune systems around the Welsh coast, notably at Newborough Warren on Anglesey, Morfa Harlech and Morfa Dyffryn in Gwynedd and at Pendine and Pembrey Burrows in Carmarthenshire and at Merthyr-mawr Warren and Kenfig Burrows in Glamorgan.

- See also Coastline of Wales

=== Karstic landforms ===
Within the limestone areas of Wales, there have arisen karstic landscapes during the postglacial period, though elements of these were initiated during and even before successive ice ages. Limestone pavements are best developed along the 'north crop' within the Brecon Beacons National Park and there are numerous sinkholes and shakeholes, together with sinks, sections of dry valley and resurgences. Cave development is extensive and includes systems such as Ogof Ffynnon Ddu (Britain's deepest cave), Dan-yr-ogof (partly showcave) and Wales's most extensive system Ogof Draenen.

== Economic geology ==
=== Metals ===
Humans have mined metals and metal ores in Wales for millennia. There are Bronze Age copper workings on the Great Orme near Llandudno and at Parys Mountain on Anglesey. Gold has been obtained since pre-Roman times at places like Dolaucothi. Lead and zinc were intensively mined in the Cwmystwyth area of mid Wales and a lead mine operated at Minera near Wrexham from the Middle Ages until the early twentieth century. In Victorian times the Sygun Copper Mine was opened near Beddgelert in Snowdonia. Ironstone is a component of the Lower Coal Measures rock sequence and where it outcrops along the northern edge of the South Wales Coalfield, it was extensively worked for the production of iron and was important in the initiation of the Industrial Revolution in South Wales.

=== Slate ===
The slate industry of Snowdonia was once of world importance. Purple and green slates of Cambrian age were worked at vast quarries on the flanks of Snowdon and at Bethesda, Dinorwig, Corris and Blaenau Ffestiniog.

=== Building stone ===
The abundance of hard rock in Wales means that it has found use in building since the earliest times. The 'bluestones' (of Ordovician dolerite) which form the lintels of Stonehenge were sourced in the Preseli Hills of Pembrokeshire around 2500 BC. Bronze Age and Iron Age peoples made extensive use of local materials in erecting a variety of cairns, standing stones and defensive works as manifest in Wales's many hill forts.

Wales's many fine cathedrals, abbeys and castles have used a variety of stones in their construction; Caerbwdi Sandstone in St David's Cathedral, Old Red Sandstone at Llanthony Priory and Tintern Abbey, 'Blue Pennant' sandstone in Caerphilly Castle and Sudbrook Sandstone at Caldicot Castle to name but a few. Triassic rocks provided the Radyr stone and also the Quarella stone which was worked at Bridgend. Sutton Stone from South Wales's Jurassic outcrop is a highly regarded limestone freestone that has been used in construction throughout the Vale of Glamorgan, it was also shipped over the Bristol Channel to North Devon and North Cornwall which are both deficient in limestone.

The micaceous sandstones of Carmarthenshire's Tilestones Formation were formerly worked to provide roofing material, as were similar flaggy sandstones elsewhere, at least until the burgeoning of the North Wales slate industry in the nineteenth century.

=== Limestone ===
Limestone has been worked on a small scale for burning in limekilns over many centuries. In more recent times it has been quarried for use as aggregate, as a flux for the steel industry and as a feed for the chemical industry.

=== Coal ===
The working of coal in Wales's various coalfields began in earnest with the initiation of the Industrial Revolution. Easily the most significant is the South Wales Coalfield though the contiguous Flintshire and Denbighshire Coalfields were of importance to the economy of northeast Wales. A rather smaller coalfield was worked in Pembrokeshire and a tiny one in Anglesey.

=== Sand and gravel ===
Deposits of glacial and fluvial sands and gravels have been and continue to be worked in numerous areas, principally for the construction industry.

== Geohazards ==
Wales is not a particularly seismically active country, nevertheless earthquakes of lesser magnitude occur from time to time. Ground stability is more of an issue due both to natural causes and, in former areas of coal and other mineral exploitation, due to mining, surface excavation and spoil deposition. Deep-mining of coal in particular has led to reactivation of pre-existing landslips, notably in the steeply-sided valleys of the South Wales Coalfield. Inappropriate placing of spoil material on such slopes has both overloaded them and disturbed drainage patterns with occasional catastrophic effect as in the Aberfan Disaster of 1966. An extensive programme of stabilisation works across the coalfield followed that event.

The contamination of land, groundwater and watercourses is a risk in areas where mineral exploitation has taken place, notably in the Central Wales Orefield and in former coal mining districts.

== Geological conservation and interpretation ==
Numerous sites have been identified as important earth science localities within the Geological Conservation Review and afforded protection as geological SSSIs. See here for complete list of both biological and geological SSSIs in Wales - some sites are protected in respect of both types of interest. In addition, two extensive areas are designated as Geoparks; the entire island of Anglesey as 'GeoMôn' in the north and Fforest Fawr within the Brecon Beacons National Park in the south. The Geoparks have a range of roles; conservation and promotion of the two areas' geological heritage are important ones. These objectives are partly achieved through educational and interpretive programmes. 'RIGS groups' are being established in different parts of Wales with the aim of supporting locations designated as regionally important geodiversity sites and assisting in the implementation of Local Geodiversity Action Plans ('LGAPs'). Local authorities and other agencies in the public sector continue to be involved in the acquisition of significant earth heritage sites, their conservation and interpretation. Charities such as Wales's wildlife trusts also have a similar role.

== See also ==
- Geology of the British Isles
- Geology of England
- Geological groups of Great Britain
- Geological structure of Great Britain
- Geology of Monmouthshire
- Geology of Carmarthenshire
- List of geological faults of Wales
- List of geological folds in Great Britain
- Geology of South Wales
- Geology of Snowdonia National Park
- Geology of Brecon Beacons National Park
- Palaeontology in Wales
- Geology of Great Britain
