= Geology of Monmouthshire =

Geology in Wales

This article describes the geology of the historic county of Monmouthshire. It includes the modern administrative county and the 'principal areas' of Torfaen, Newport and Blaenau Gwent together with those parts of Cardiff and Caerphilly to the east of the Rhymney River.

The geology of Monmouthshire in southeast Wales largely consists of a thick series of sedimentary rocks of different types originating in the Silurian, Devonian, Carboniferous, Triassic and Jurassic periods.

The oldest rocks, of Silurian age, occur as a broad, northeast to southwest aligned anticline in the heart of the county. The central portion of this zone, between Usk and Pontypool, comprises the outcrop of the older shales, limestones and sandstones and, surrounded as it is by outcrops of younger rocks, is traditionally referred to as the Usk Inlier. These younger rocks are a mix of sandstones and mudstones of Devonian age and commonly referred to as the Old Red Sandstone or, colloquially the 'ORS'. The oldest rocks of the ORS sequence (and hence lowest in the sequence), the mudstones of the Raglan Mudstone Formation, are also assigned to the Silurian period, though were once considered to be Devonian. Towards the eastern, southeastern and western margins of the county are successive layers of rocks of Carboniferous age. The oldest of these and hence the lowest, resting directly on the ORS are various formations of the Carboniferous Limestone. These in turn are overlain, in the west, by the sandstones and mudstones of the Marros Group (formerly referred to as the 'Millstone Grit series') and lastly by the sandstones, mudstones and coal seams of the South Wales Coal Measures.

Along the southern coastal strip are rocks of Triassic age which unconformably overlie the Devonian and Carboniferous rocks. An area of countryside at Llanwern, east of Newport is characterised by rocks of Jurassic age, the youngest solid rocks which occur within the county. Similar though smaller outcrops of Jurassic rocks can be found at Goldcliff on the Severn Estuary and also, concealed beneath more recent sediments, near the mouth of the Ebbw River south of Newport.

There are a range of different types of superficial deposits of Quaternary age overlying the solid rocks ranging from estuarine alluvium along the coastal strip, through riverine alluvium in the floors of the major river valleys to glacial till and glacial sands and gravels. These 'drift' deposits also include peat, head and landslip masses of both bedrock and superficial material. Karstification continues in connection with the Carboniferous Limestone outcrop.

== Silurian ==
Geology of Monmouthshire; map

There is an inlier of rocks of Silurian age in the heart of the county, west of Usk and straddling the River Usk and known accordingly as the Usk Inlier. These rocks consist of a thick sequence (over 600m / 2000 ft) assigned to the Přídolí, Ludlow and Wenlock series. The oldest parts of the succession, the Wenlock Shales and Wenlock Limestone of early authors are now referred to as the Glascoed Mudstone, Ton Siltstone and Usk Limestone. Together these comprise the local Wenlock succession. Above these are the former Lower Ludlow Shales, now the Lower and Upper Forest Beds, and the Aymestry Limestone, now the Lower Llanbadoc Beds. The Upper Llanbadoc Beds and Lower, Middle and Upper Llangibby Beds (collectively forming the larger part of the former Upper Ludlow Shales) complete the Ludlow series. All of these rocks are of marine origin, their lithologies suggestive of a variety of deep and shallow water environments during deposition. The uppermost Silurian rocks are the Downton Castle Sandstone and the overlying Raglan Mudstones, both of Přídolían age. The Přídolían rocks were deposited in various coastal and floodplain environments.

== Devonian ==
Within Monmouthshire, the Devonian consists entirely of the Old Red Sandstone. It is widespread in its occurrence from the Black Mountains in the north, wrapping around either side of the centrally located Usk Inlier and extending in a strip north of Newport towards Cardiff. Traditionally divided into three parts, the lowermost Red Marl Group, the middle Red Sandstone Group and uppermost Quartz Conglomerate Group, modern classification of the sequence recognises the St Maughans Formation (which directly overlies the Raglan Mudstone Formation), the Senni Formation and the Brownstones Formation (these three comprising the Lower Devonian) together with the Plateau Beds Formation and Quartz Conglomerate Group of the Upper Devonian.

The relatively hard-wearing sandstones of the Brownstones Formation form the greater part of the Black Mountains ridges of Hatterrall Hill and Chwarel y Fan and the conspicuous hills of Sugar Loaf, Ysgyryd Fawr and Bryn Arw. The Brownstones also give rise to a major landscape feature in eastern Monmouthshire, a sinuous though largely unbroken west and northwest-facing escarpment which runs from the Wye Valley at Monmouth south and southwest to Newport and forming the hills at Trellech, Devauden and at Wentwood. Graig Syfyrddin forms a westerly outlier of this scarp. South of Gaer Wood, west of Trellech, it forms a significant watershed with streams running west, draining into the Usk catchment.

The uppermost Devonian age pebbly conglomerates of the Quartz Conglomerate Formation give rise in the east of the county to a secondary, though less pronounced scarp which provides this part of Monmouthshire with its highest elevation, the 306m / 1003 ft high flat-topped eminence of Beacon Hill.

== Carboniferous ==
Carboniferous rocks occur most widely in the west of the county where the deeply dissected plateau of the South Wales Coalfield consists of the Coal Measures sandstones, mudstones and of course, coal seams - all of Westphalian age. The plateau is edged by the outcrop of the Namurian age Millstone Grit and the Dinantian age Carboniferous Limestone. The Carboniferous Limestone also occurs widely in the southeast of the county and along the sides of the Wye Valley.

=== Carboniferous Limestone ===
The limestone of South Wales is subdivided into a number of individual formations, not all of which are present in Monmouthshire and some that are, are notably thinner here than is the case further to the west. Those which outcrop on the north and east facing scarp which forms the edge of the coalfield dip into the coalfield at increasingly steep angles as the outcrop is traced south from Blorenge through Pontypool to the northeastern edge of Cardiff. The outcrop was extensively quarried in the past particularly around Gilwern Hill and Blorenge, in connection with the former ironworking industry.

=== Marros Group ===
Referred to traditionally as the Millstone Grit (Series), the group comprises a basal sandstone overlain by mudstones. The sandstone, formerly known as the Basal Grit but now known formally as the Twrch Sandstone outcrops around Blorenge but can be difficult to distinguish from the overlying sandstone.

=== South Wales Coal Measures ===
The Coal Measures occupy the majority of the western part of the historic county, today's Caerphilly and Blaenau Gwent unitary districts and half of Torfaen. Though now defunct, the legacy of the coal industry in this area is considerable. A sandstone extends widely across the area near the base of the Lower Coal Measures and is overlain by coal and ironstone-rich strata. The uppermost Coal Measures are again dominated by sandstone, the Pennant Sandstone forming the tops of the hills between the 'coalfield valleys'. Recent changes in stratigraphic nomenclature place these sandstones within the Warwickshire Group.

== Triassic ==
The almost flat-lying sandstones of the Triassic unconformably overlie the older rocks which tend to dip to the south. The Triassic sandstones are often known as the New Red Sandstone thereby distinguishing them from the Devonian age Old Red Sandstone. The uppermost beds of the Triassic are the Rhaetian age 'Rhaetic' which occur in the Llanwern and Wilcrick areas and at Goldcliff. At Black Rock near Portskewett are seaweed-covered outcrops of sandstone which form a part of the Mercia Mudstone Group. It was beneath these rocks and through the underlying Pennant Sandstone that the Severn Tunnel was driven between 1873 and 1886 from nearby Sudbrook.

== Jurassic ==
A small outlier of Jurassic age strata occurs east of Newport as does a rather smaller one on the coast at Goldcliff. They comprise rocks assigned to the Lias. The cliff exposure here was commented upon by Gerald of Wales in his 1191 Itinerarium Kambriae: Not far hence is a rocky eminence, impending over the Severn, call . . . Gouldcliffe or golden rock, because from the reflections of the sun's rays it assumes a bright golden colour.

=== Origins of the Wye gorge ===
The origins of the deeply incised gorge of the River Wye which forms Monmouthshire's eastern border continue to be discussed. One proposal, that of superimposed drainage is that during the Jurassic and Cretaceous periods, sedimentary rocks similar in part to those found in the Cotswolds, were laid down across the area, burying the older Carboniferous Limestone. During the succeeding Tertiary period, an early version of the Wye flowed across the area, which at that time formed a flat coastal plain, and developed large meanders as it did so. When the land in the area subsequently began to rise relative to sea level the river was able to maintain its course by cutting down into its bed, so incising its course. In time the younger rocks were eroded away entirely whilst the river began to cut down through the underlying Carboniferous rock succession, as revealed in the sometimes craggy sides of the gorge today. Another theory for its formation involves the erosive power of debris-laden glacial meltwater escaping from proglacial lakes.

== Igneous rocks ==
Igneous rocks are limited to a couple of very minor intrusions of monchiquite in the Old Red Sandstone to the southeast of Usk. There appears however to be a common (and mistaken) belief amongst non-geologists that Sugar Loaf is an extinct volcano. Nevertheless, it is formed entirely of sedimentary rocks but has been eroded into a shape which, particularly when viewed from the east, is reminiscent of a stratovolcano.

== Structure ==
There are numerous faults which affect the Silurian, Devonian and Carboniferous rocks of the county. They are most numerous, or at least have been most intensively mapped, within the Coalfield area. The majority in this area are aligned northwest to southeast.

In the north, the major fracture known as the Neath Disturbance cuts north-east trending through the Old Red Sandstone to the north of Sugar Loaf and thence along the Monnow valley to its east. It is the southernmost major tectonic feature of the British Caledonide belt, though was active again in the later Variscan orogeny. Three roughly north-south aligned reverse faults are recognised in the Chepstow-Caldicot area.

== Quaternary ==
=== Glacial legacy ===
There is clear evidence for glaciation of the uplands in the west of the county having taken place on one or more occasions. The Vale of Ewyas in the Black Mountains and the Sirhowy Valley, Rhymney Valley, Ebbw Vale and the valley of the Ebbw Fach in the Coalfield bear the hallmarks of glacial excavation - U-shaped profiles and over-steepened sides. There are moreover stretches of glacial till spread across their flanks. Substantial moraines are evident in the Usk valley including the Nevill Hall/Llanfoist moraine south of Abergavenny and the Usk Moraine which is believed to represent the furthest advance of an Usk valley glacier during the last Ice Age.

The Punchbowl is a well-developed glacial cirque on the eastern side of Blorenge. There are no indications that Cwm Craf on its northern side held a glacier but it is perhaps periglacial in origin.

=== Karst and caves ===
Small areas of karst landscape have developed where the Carboniferous Limestone is present at or near the ground surface, notably from the eastern margins of Mynydd Llangatwg through Gilwern Hill to Blorenge. In places interstratal karst has developed where relatively thin, younger rocks cover the limestone. Numerous caves have developed in the Clydach Gorge and Gilwern Hill areas, some of which are amongst the most extensive in Britain. The Ogof Draenen network for example, is Wales' longest cave (and Britain's second longest), extending in excess of 70 km. Ogof y Daren Cilau and Ogof Agen Allwedd have developed beneath Mynydd Llangatwg; the waters of the latter resurge in the Clydach gorge. There are further karstic features to the north and west of Chepstow; sinks, caves and resurgences, including the unusual (insofar as sections of it are affected by tides) and 'well-decorated' cave of Otter Hole on the banks of the Wye.

=== Landslips ===
==== Coalfield and fringes ====
Landslips are common on the steep sides of the coalfield valleys where a combination of glacial over-deepening and the presence of the Pennant Sandstone overlying weaker mudstones has provided favourable conditions for ground movement. Mining activity has reactivated ancient landslips in certain cases. Slips are especially common around Coity Mountain and within the Sirhowy and the two Ebbw valleys. On the northeastern fringe of the coalfield, there are slips in the vicinity of Blorenge, the most well-known of which is the Tumble through which the B4246 road climbs towards Keeper's Pond.

A notable example of mass movement is Mynydd Henllys, west of Cwmbran where a large section of the mountain has slipped northwestwards into the post-glacially deepened valley of the Nant Cam, leaving a 2 km long degraded fissure feature high on the eastern slopes. It owes its origin to a mass of sandstone slipping in rotational fashion on a surface approximating to the Brithdir coal seam and associated mudstones and seatearths.

==== Black Mountains ====
The Black Mountains and nearby lesser hills formed from the Old Red Sandstone are formed from interlayered sandstones and less competent mudstones with the whole typically dipping southwards. The rocks are fractured in places and valley sides have been oversteepened by the passage of glacial ice. Various combinations of these circumstances has led to large numbers of landslips having taken place over millennia. Major slips are apparent on the western flanks of Ysgyryd Fawr and also affecting its southern ridge. Slips occur on either side of Cwm Coedycerrig with the largest affecting the southeastern slopes of Gaer on the north side. The landslip material fills the valley floor. Smaller slips are evident on the northern slopes of the Sugar Loaf though the largest on that hill is at Graig where a spur extends towards the River Usk. Cwmyoy village famous for the crooked nature of St Martins Church sits on a landslip extending down from Hatterrall Hill which is still moving, albeit slowly. Nearby is the large sandstone cliff of the Darren, the back wall of another large slip. Further slips are evident within the Vale of Ewyas including the ground which rises to the east above Llanthony Priory.

Further east in lowland Monmouthshire, though affecting the same rock strata, landslips are recorded around Graig Syfyrddin and towards the Monnow valley as at Coed y Pwll northwest of Skenfrith.

==== Wye valley ====
The deep incision of the Wye into the landscape on Monmouthshire’s eastern border has left slopes open to landslip. Two significant examples are seen between St Arvans and Tintern where Black Cliff and Wyndcliff represent the back walls of broad slips which extend down to the riverbank. Both crags are formed from strata of the Black Rock Limestone Subgroup (traditionally referred to as the 'Lower Dolomite'). It sits atop the less competent strata of the Avon Group (traditionally the 'Lower Limestone Shale') which has collapsed under the loading. The A466 road runs through the middle of both slips.

=== Alluvium ===
The floodplains of each of the major river valleys within the county are floored by fluviatile alluvium. The most extensive is that of the River Usk though this narrows for a couple of miles south of Llanvihangel Gobion. Those of the River Monnow and Afon Lwyd are up to 350m wide in places whilst that of the Trothy is rather narrower. In contrast there are wide spreads of these deposits around the smaller Olway Brook from Raglan southwards. Alluvial flats are restricted within the Wye valley as the river has cut itself a narrow gorge. The Coalfield rivers show similarly restricted floodplain development, occupying as they do, valleys which have been cut largely by glacial action.

There is evidence of river terrace development along the course of both the Usk and the Wye.

There are extensive deposits of estuarine alluvium on the shores of the Severn. The bulk of this is in the form of silt of a blue/grey colour. The reclaimed estuarine flats behind the modern sea defences are as much as 5 kilometres (3.1 mi) in width east of Newport. Tidal flats extend considerably into the Severn estuary.

=== Artificial ground ===
Within the coalfield, as a result of mining activities, there are a number of areas of artificially made ground, consisting for the most part of spoil from both opencasting for coal and deep mining. A high profile example is that of the Canada Tips, an area of excavation and deposition of Coal Measures rocks north of Blaenavon associated in particular with opencasting during the Second World War. It is now included within the Blaenavon Industrial Landscape World Heritage Site. Other areas are formed by material such as slag from former ironworks.

== Geoconservation and geotourism ==
An early appreciation of a landscape shaped by its geology was afforded to those who undertook the Wye Tour in the late 18th and early 19th centuries, a significant part of the Picturesque movement. The combination of towering limestone cliffs, wooded hillsides and cultural items such as Tintern Abbey contributed to the perceived sublime nature of the area. In more recent times (1971) it has been designated an area of outstanding natural beauty or AONB.

Some sites of special scientific interest within the county (or in a number of cases, straddling its boundaries) have been designated wholly or largely on geological grounds, an example being the Upper Wye Gorge SSSI. Other sites have been recognised as regionally important geodiversity sites or RIGS. The World Heritage Site at Blaenavon (described above) is designated principally for its industrial heritage which is almost wholly based on the local extraction of coal, ironstone, limestone and silica rock for the production of iron. Accordingly it seeks to conserve and promote various of these sites.

The hills and mountains of northwest Monmouthshire form a part of the Brecon Beacons National Park designated in 1957. Numerous publications list walks in the area visiting and interpreting the area's industrial archaeology centred on exploitation of its underlying geology.

== Economic geology ==
Monmouthshire extends into the easternmost part of the South Wales Coalfield and accordingly there was historically considerable extractive industry in that area associated not just with coal mining but also workings for ironstone and indeed for limestone. The 'north crop' of the limestone was worked in a semi-continuous line of quarries eastwards from the border with the then county of Brecknock, now Powys. These quarries are found on the broadly north-facing scarps of Mynydd Llangatwg, Gilwern Hill and Blorenge. Substantial quarries also operated within the Clydach Gorge. Shallower workings followed the 'east crop' south from Blorenge along the eastern slopes of Mynydd y Garn-fawr and Mynydd Garnclochdy to Pontypool where the limestone strata is thinner than to the west. Most quarries were served either by tramroads connecting to the canal or else to ironworks such as those at Nantyglo. Limestone was also formerly worked in the Wye Valley on the county's eastern border. The Lower Dolomite was once quarried at Hadnock Quarry on the left (south) bank of the Wye, northeast of Monmouth as it was too at Livox Quarry north of Chepstow and at Beaufort Quarries south of Chepstow. All of these quarries are now abandoned.

== See also ==
- Geology of the United Kingdom
- Geology of Wales
