= Geology of Brecon Beacons National Park =

Overview of geology of a UK national park

This article describes the geology of the Brecon Beacons National Park in mid/south Wales. The area gained national park status in 1957 with the designated area of 1,344 km^{2} (519 sq mi) including mountain massifs to both the east and west of the Brecon Beacons proper. The geology of the national park consists of a thick succession of sedimentary rocks laid down from the late Ordovician through the Silurian and Devonian to the late Carboniferous period. The rock sequence most closely associated with the park is the Old Red Sandstone from which most of its mountains are formed. The older parts of the succession, in the northwest, were folded and faulted during the Caledonian orogeny. Further faulting and folding, particularly in the south of the park is associated with the Variscan orogeny.

The area was subject to glaciation during the Quaternary ice ages and periglacial processes and landslips have contributed further to the character of the modern landscape. Quarrying for limestone and sandstone were significant extractive industries in the past whilst tourism based in large part upon the perceived quality of the area's landscape is important for the modern economy.

== Ordovician ==
Rock strata of Ordovician age is found in the extreme northwest of the area. The oldest rocks exposed at the surface are the Llanvirn age mudstones of the Abergwilli (sic) Formation. Also in this tract of country between Llandeilo and Llangadog are the hard and often pebbly sandstones of the overlying Ffairfach Grit Formation which form the low hill of Y Garn Goch. Above these are the thinly laminated sandstones of the Llandeilo Flags Formation succeeded in turn by the slumped beds of the Ashgillian Nantmel Mudstones, seen at Myddfai for example.

== Silurian ==
Silurian rocks are found in the northwest of the park where a north-east to south-west aligned tract of country running (within the park) from Halfway southwest to Trap is known to geologists as the Myddfai Steep Belt and formed from a succession of sandstones and mudstones of Wenlockian, Ludlovian and Pridoli age. Beginning with the Tirabad Formation, the Wenlockian part comprises the Sawdde Sandstone, Ffinnant Sandstone and Halfway Farm formations. The Ludlow age part comprises the Hafod Fawr, Mynydd Myddfai Sandstone, Trichrug and Cae’r Mynach formations. There are occasional siltstone, ironstone and limestone units within this succession.

Much of the park sits within the Anglo-Welsh basin which was active from late Silurian times through the Devonian to the early Carboniferous during which time it acquired a mix of sand, mud and silt which would eventually become the sandstones, mudstones and siltstones of the Old Red Sandstone, often contracted to ‘ORS’.

The base of the Old Red Sandstone has traditionally been defined at the base of the Tilestones Formation, a thin mica-rich sandstone at the Ludlow – Pridoli boundary. It is overlain by around 700m thickness of mudstones and siltstones with occasional sandstone beds and calcretes known as the Raglan Mudstone Formation. An airfall volcanic ash deposit (tuff) up to 1m thick, the Townsend Tuff Bed, can be seen towards the top of this formation. The Raglan Mudstones also form the lower slopes of Pen-y-crug near Brecon and the lower ground in the Wye valley section of the park between Talgarth and Hay-on-Wye.

In the east of the park, the formation is completed by a calcrete locally up to 10m thick and representing a long period of sub-aerial weathering at the end of the Pridoli. It was traditionally known as the Psammosteus Limestone (from a mis-identified fossil), then as the Bishop's Frome Limestone and most recently, having been correlated with similar strata in Pembrokeshire, as the Chapel Point Limestone Member.

== Devonian ==
The lower ORS is essentially detrital material eroded from the Caledonian Mountains to the north and west and deposited in this basin south of the orogen. Its deposition continued in the early Devonian and is present as the St Maughans, Senni and Brownstones formations. During the middle Devonian, the Acadian orogeny resulted in uplift, non-deposition and erosion such that the Upper ORS sits with a slight angular unconformity on the lower ORS, middle Devonian strata being missing in this region. Mudstones dominate the lower part of the sequence but sandstones came to be more prominent towards the top. Besides calcretes, other horizons which appear markedly different are the intraformational conglomerates which often stand out as steps within stream profiles due to their being relatively hard-wearing.

The upper ORS is formed by deposition of materials associated with the start of the Variscan orogenic cycle.[pdf, p15] In the west and centre of the park, the Upper Old Red Sandstone consists of the Plateau Beds and the unconformably overlying Grey Grits Formation. The former provide the flat tops of peaks like Pen y Fan and Corn Du as well as other of the higher summits. Going east from Talybont-on-Usk the Plateau Beds are increasingly overlain by the sandstones of the Quartz Conglomerate Group until, as the Plateau Beds are cut out south of Llangynidr, the Quartz Conglomerate constitutes, in its outcrop along the southern side of the Usk valley, the entire upper ORS sequence in the east. It forms an isolated outlier at the very summit of the Sugar Loaf.

== Carboniferous ==
The park sits at the northern edge of the South Wales Coalfield basin which was active throughout the Carboniferous period. During much of this time, world sea levels were fluctuating as South polar icecaps grew and shrank in the course of the long drawn out Karoo glaciation.

=== Carboniferous Limestone ===
A narrow outcrop of Carboniferous Limestone extends east-west across the southern part of the park from Blorenge in the east through Gilwern Hill, Mynydd Llangatwg, Mynydd Llangynidr, Cefn yr Ystrad, Cefn Cil Sanws and Moel Penderyn to Dinas Rock. West of here its outcrop is offset to the north by the Neath Disturbance as it wraps around the north of Waterfall Country through the Ogof Ffynnon Ddu national nature reserve to Cribarth and the Black Mountains. Both the thickness and details of the sequence vary from east to west with dolomites and palaeokarsts more common in the east.

Outliers of the Carboniferous Limestone occur at Carreg Cennen where the castle is built atop a 100m cliff of the rock in what is otherwise ORS territory, and again at Pen Cerrig-calch north of Crickhowell in the east of the park. The limestone sequence here is notably thinner than that evident a few miles to the south in the main ‘north crop’. There are further outliers around Cwm Taf Fechan associated with faulting along the Neath Disturbance.

=== Marros Group ===
The Marros Group is the modern name for the South Walian rock sequence traditionally referred to as the Millstone Grit Series. It consists of the Twrch Sandstone Formation (traditionally the ‘Basal Grit’), overlain by the Bishopston Mudstone Formation (traditionally the Middle Shale(s)). The latter contains numerous thin sandstones, some of which are named and which provide for notable features in the landscape of the park, e.g the Twelve Foot Sandstone. It is this rock over which the Afon Pyrddin falls to form Sgwd Gwladus. The Twrch Sandstone forms large expanses of often rough and poorly drained moorland from the southern slopes of the Black Mountain in the west to those of Cefn yr Ystrad and Mynydd Llangynidr further east.

=== South Wales Coal Measures ===
Small areas of coalfield rocks occur within the park. At the base of the succession is the Farewell Rock, the faulted outcrop of which occurs along the park’s southern margin. It forms the lip over which the Nant Llech drops to form Henrhyd Falls at Coelbren. Succeeding parts of the lower Coal Measures extend into the park in the Amman valley and the lower parts of the Giedd and Twrch valleys as at Henllys Vale as well as sections of the Tawe and Pyrddin valleys. Further east Coal Measures sandstones and mudstones form large parts of the upper surfaces of Mynydd Llangatwg and of the hills which now form a part of the Blaenavon Industrial Landscape World Heritage Site including Blorenge.

== Geological structures ==
The area was at the southern margin of the Caledonian orogen and at the northern margin of the later Variscan orogen and hence displays in its geology, influences of both orogenies. Three lineaments in the landscape, each commonly referred to as a ‘disturbance’, arise from the earlier mountain-building period; two of these were reactivated during the later one. Each one is a mix of faults and folds along its length. Movement on each of these is considered to have been complex.

The Myddfai Steep Belt marks the edge of the Palaeozoic Welsh Basin; rocks to its southeast are generally flat-lying to gently dipping to the south and southeast whereas those within it are steeply titled and to the north Caledonian folding is evident through mid Wales. To the southeast of this zone is the Carreg Cennen Disturbance which runs on Caledonoid lines from Pembrokeshire to the English border, passing through the northwest of the park and around the castle from which it derives its name.

The Swansea Valley Disturbance runs from Swansea Bay to Herefordshire up the Swansea Valley into the park, through the NE-SW aligned ridge of Cribarth and on towards Brecon. It is responsible for the WSW-ENE alignment of a portion of the Wye Valley. At Cribarth, Variscan movement on this Caledonoid feature has given rise to a couple of folds in the limestone and overlying Twrch Sandstone from which the present landform has subsequently been carved, in part by glacial action. The southernmost lineament is the Neath Disturbance which runs ENE from Swansea Bay up the Vale of Neath and into the park at Pontneddfechan. The limestone is tightly folded here at Bwa Maen (Welsh: 'stone bow') and again at Moel Penderyn, through which it next passes. It passes beneath Pontsticill Reservoir, across the top of Dyffryn Crawnon and then down the shallow Onneu valley to Crickhowell. The erosion of the faulted rocks further ENE on this alignment has led to the valley which separates Sugar Loaf from the main Black Mountains massif and also for a WSW-ENE aligned section of the Monnow valley.

Numerous normal faults are recorded traversing the park in a north-south to NW-SE direction, particularly within the Carboniferous outcrop. Many were syn-depositional as the Coalfield basin extended east-west during the Variscan orogeny. Certain of the faults form significant modern day features, the Henrhyd Fault being responsible for the waterfall of that name at Coelbren and another for the celebrated Sgwd yr Eira on the Hepste.

== Cenozoic era ==
In places within the limestone and Twrch Sandstone outcrop are pockets of silica sand which are weathered forms of the otherwise tough Twrch Sandstone which may have been formed during the Palaeogene period. They have been exploited for brick-making at Penwyllt and on Carn Fadog amongst other places.

=== Karst landscape ===
Dissolution of the limestone has led to the development of a karst landscape along the outcrop of this rock and one of interstratal karst along the outcrop of the overlying Twrch Sandstone. The interstratal karst of Mynydd Llangynidr has been recognised as being of importance and designated as a geological site of special scientific interest.

A large number of caves have developed, several of which rank amongst the longest in Britain. In the upper Swansea Valley is Ogof Ffynnon Ddu, Britain’s deepest cave with a vertical development of 274.5m whilst nearby is Dan yr Ogof, part of which is operated as a show cave. In the east of the park are the Ogof y Daren Cilau, Ogof Agen Allwedd and Ogof Draenen systems. Also of note, partly on account of their cultural associations, are the caves of Eglwys Faen and Chartist Cave. The former is situated at the rear of the great embayment at the Craig y Cilau national nature reserve and the latter is high on Mynydd Llangynidr. The age of the caves is not well constrained but an age of at least 780,000 years is suggested for at least some of the larger ones since certain cave sediments contain evidence of the last reversal of the Earth's magnetic field. Radiometric dating of some speleothems also extends their age to beyond half a million years.

=== Glacial legacy ===
The area has been subject to several glacial periods, of which the last, the Devensian finished 11,700 years ago. Glacial ice is thought to have covered the majority of the park at the height of the last glaciation around 22,000 years ago though some areas remained unglaciated including the larger part of the Black Mountains. Elsewhere the highest peaks protruded above the ice as nunataks. Though terminal moraines lay largely outside of the park's boundaries, a number of recessional moraines have been identified. There are several cirque moraines which are thought to date from the Loch Lomond Stadial between 12,900 and 11,500 years ago. These include the features around Llyn y Fan Fach and Llyn Cwm Llwch, both of which lakes occupy glacially excavated rock hollows or cirques. Glacial erratics are common, the most obvious being those of Old Red Sandstone perched on various of the limestone pavements which lie to the south of the sandstone outcrops. Glacial striations and polish are also recorded, particularly from exposed surfaces of the Twrch Sandstone.

=== Mass movement ===
A number of landslides are recorded within the park. Amongst the more spectacular is that at Craig Cerrig-gleisiad. This L-shaped cwm was thought to be entirely glacial in origin until the 1990s but it is now recognised that a significant long run-out landslide occurred here with the failure of the glacially over-steepened western wall of the cwm, some time after the main glacial but before the Loch Lomond Stadial. Some 'rucking' of slipped masses of bedrock appears on the hillside to the north of this feature, the result of a separate bedding plane slide.

=== Superficial deposits ===
Superficial deposits of various kinds have accumulated during the Quaternary period. Narrow strips of alluvium i.e. accumulations of clay, silt, sand and gravel, occur along the valley floors Fragmentary rock material, the product of weathering, known as head is recorded. Peat of variable depth is extensive. River terrace deposits are found in places.

== Economic geology ==
Several different rocks and minerals have been quarried or mined in the area over the centuries though only one limestone quarry remains active within the national park.

=== Limestone ===
Abandoned quarries lie along the length of the limestone outcrop. Early quarrying was on a small scale for the production of lime for agricultural use and building. Innumerable small quarries and ruinous limekilns remain. Quarries increased in number and in scale as the ironworking industry developed during the nineteenth century. The tramroads linking the quarries with the iron works remain a notable feature in the landscape.

=== Silica rock and sand ===
Certain units within the Twrch Sandstone (formerly known as the Basal Grit) were found in the nineteenth century to be of sufficient purity to make the rock suitable for the manufacture of refractory bricks for lining furnaces. The silica rock mines at Dinas Rock were amongst the first in operation after William Weston Young patented the method of production and leased land their for the purpose of mining and processing. Silica rock was also quarried at Penwyllt, prior to a deposit of much more readily workable silica sand being discovered a couple of miles away.

=== Lead and zinc ===
Lead and zinc ores were mined on a small scale during the nineteenth century in the area around Myddfai.

=== Rottenstone ===
The Upper Limestone Shale has weathered at outcrop to produce a material known as rottenstone. It was quarried along its narrow outcrop during the nineteenth century for use as an industrial polish.

=== Building stone ===
Innumerable quarries have been opened in suitable sandstone units of the Old Red Sandstone as local sources of stone for constructing buildings and field walls. None are now licensed for extraction within the park.

=== Tilestones ===
Prior to slates from North Wales being widely available later in the nineteenth century, poorer quality roofing material was obtained locally by working the flaggier sandstones within the Old Red Sandstone, notably the mica-rich strata of the basal Tilestones Formation. Referred to informally as the ‘Long Quarry’ (the origin of the ‘Long Quarry Formation’, an earlier name for this rock unit), the workings along the narrow linear outcrop can still be seen across Mynydd Bach Trecastell and Mynydd Myddfai and further west along the strike of this unit.

== Geological conservation and protection ==
There are a number of national nature reserves (NNRs), sites of special scientific interest (SSSIs) and special areas of conservation (SACs) within the national park. Whilst most have been designated on biological grounds, many have a geological component. Eleven of the 85 SSSIs within the park such as that covering Mynydd Llangynidr are primarily focused on geology with a further thirteen characterised as 'mixed' i.e. designated on both geological and biological grounds. There are also several dozen regionally important geodiversity sites (RIGS) established within the park.

== Tourism ==
The western half of the national park was established as a Geopark in 2005 and is now a member of the UNESCO Global Geoparks Network. Fforest Fawr UNESCO Global Geopark aims to promote sustainable tourism within the area based upon the area's natural and cultural heritage. The world heritage site at Blaenavon straddles the national park's southeastern boundary; its focus is on the exploitation of the area's diverse geological resources and the economic and social changes wrought.
