= Geology of Carmarthenshire =

Geology in Wales

The bedrock geology of Carmarthenshire in west Wales consists largely of Palaeozoic age sedimentary rocks. Unconsolidated (or 'superficial') deposits of Quaternary age in Carmarthenshire include a dissected cover of glacial till, valley floor alluvium and some scattered peat deposits in both upland and lowland settings. There are extensive beach and tidal flat deposits along the Carmarthenshire coast. The exploitation of the county's mineral riches, particularly coal and limestone, was a key part of the local economy through much of the nineteenth and twentieth centuries.

== Precambrian ==
An occurrence of extrusive igneous rocks of limited extent and of Neoproterozoic age is found to the northwest of Llanybri. Also in the vicinity are some Proterozoic age intrusive microgabbros.

== Ordovician ==
Roughly half of the county is underlain directly by rocks of Ordovician age. Mudstones, siltstones and sandstones of Arenigian, Llanvirnian and Ashgillian age occur in a broad band from the northeast through the centre of the county and west to the Pembrokeshire border. They also extend northwards to the Ceredigion border west of Llanybydder.

== Silurian ==
Silurian sandstones and mudstones of Llandovery age extend into the county from Ceredigion, forming a part of what was traditionally referred to as the 'Central Wales Synclinorium'. They occur too in a narrow strip running NE-SW through Llandovery towards Llandeilo and include the lowermost parts of the Old Red Sandstone. A further occurrence of Silurian strata is in the Whitland area.

== Devonian ==
The Devonian in Wales is more or less synonymous with the Old Red Sandstone though, as noted above, the lowermost part of the 'ORS' is of late Silurian age. A band of country is characterised by the ORS from the Usk Reservoir and Fan Brycheiniog on the Powys border west to Tavernspite on the Pembrokeshire border. The ORS forms the Black Mountain scarp of which the Carmarthenshire section rises to 781m at Fan Foel, the highest point in the county.

== Carboniferous ==
Carboniferous rocks provide the bedrock in the southeast of the county and in its extreme southwestern corner.

=== Carboniferous Limestone ===
The various limestones and shales of the Carboniferous Limestone Supergroup form an almost unbroken outcrop from the heart of the Black Mountain west via Llandyfan to the Gwendraeth estuary north of Kidwelly. To the west of Carmarthen Bay, it is seen again at Pendine where it extends west into Pembrokeshire. There are a handful of minor outliers to the north of the main outcrop, the most notable of which from a landscape perspective is that in the Brecon Beacons National Park on which Carreg Cennen Castle is built.

For much of its outcrop, the limestone forms a broken north to northwest facing scarp. Innumerable small workings opened up to provide lime for agricultural and building use are scattered along its length along with a fewer number of large quarries. Being soluble, the limestone hosts a number of cave systems, though most are short. Of particular note is Llygad Llwchwr. Water exiting the system at this resurgence has been dye-tested to sinks in the vicinity of the A4069 road high on the Black Mountain several kilometres to the east. Another major resurgence is that of Ffrydiau Twrch above the upper Afon Twrch. It discharges water that has been traced to sinks northwest of Cefn Carn Fadog and east of Foel Fraith. In the west of the county, a large resurgence on the beach near Ragwen Point discharges water from sinks on the northern margin of the limestone outcrop east of Marros.

=== Marros Group ===
The Marros Group is the modern formal name used in South Wales for what was traditionally referred to as the Millstone Grit series. The Twrch Sandstone Formation (traditionally the 'Basal Grit') overlies the limestone unconformably and is in turn overlain by the Bishopston Mudstone Formation (traditionally the 'Middle Shale'). These rocks outcrop in a band immediately south of the limestonebetween the county boundary with Powys at the Afon Twrch in the Black Mountain, west via Carmel to Kidwelly. The outcrop continues to the west of Carmarthen Bay but only a small portion lies within Carmarthenshire. Significantly this is in the vicinity of the hamlet of Marros from which place this part of the geological succession derives its name. The coastal feature of Telpyn Point near the border with Pembrokeshire gives its name to the highest part of the Marros Group succession, the Telpyn Point Sandstone. Glaciated pavements of Twrch Sandstone characterise the ridge of Garreg Las

=== Coal Measures and Pennant Sandstone ===
The northwestern corner of the South Wales Coalfield extends into the southeast of the county from Ystradowen in the east to Pembrey in the west. The rocks of the South Wales Coal Measures Group are divided into three formations (lower, middle and upper) and these are in turn overlain by the Pennant Sandstone Formation. All are found within this part of the county, the Pennant Sandstone lying to the south of an uneven line between Cwmgors and Burry Port via Cross Hands.

== Geological structure ==
A series of major faults and folds run across the county eastwards from Pembrokeshire before curving towards the northeast. These reflect the dynamics of the Caledonian Orogeny which marked the collision of the micro-continent of Avalonia (of which the future Wales formed a part) with the former continent of Laurentia to the north. The Carboniferous strata in the southeast are affected by numerous N-S or NNW-SSE aligned normal faults.

== Quaternary ==
The Welsh ice sheet over-ran Carmarthenshire during the last and earlier ice ages whilst Irish Sea ice invaded the county from the west. Rivers have continued to erode valleys into the earlier upland surface both prior to and since the ice age. The sub-surface dissolution of limestone has resulted in extended areas of overlying Marros Group strata foundering, notably to the north and west of Tair Carn Uchaf and to the east of Foel Fraith in the national park section of Carmarthenshire.

=== Glacial legacy ===
There is one well-developed glacial cirque in Carmarthenshire, that which contains Llyn y Fan Fach beneath the Black Mountain scarp. A couple of less well-defined cirques lie just to its east at Pwll yr Henllyn and Pant y Bwlch both of which sport depositional features interpreted as cirque moraines though origins as protalus ramparts have also been postulated. Glacio-fluvial deposits are common in the broader parts of the Teifi valley between Lampeter and Llandysul and more patchily down to Newcastle Emlyn. They are also widespread in the Towy valley between Rhandirmwyn and Llandovery and more locally at Carmarthen where parts of the town are built upon them. Glacial till is widely encountered across the county and derives from both the Welsh ice-sheet and Irish Sea ice.

=== Post-glacial deposits ===
The floors of the major valleys are floored with alluvium (sand, silt, gravel and pebbles) built up since the last ice age. River terraces are present along the length of the Towy and Loughor valleys in particular. There are broad expanses of beach and tidal flat deposits around the coast and extending up the estuaries of the Taf, Towy and Loughor. Small areas of landslip are locally present along the side of the Teifi valley. There is an isolated slip in Carboniferous strata in Cwm Pedol north of Garnant.

== Economic geology ==
Numerous quarries have exploited the narrow band of Carboniferous Limestone; those in continued use in 2020 include Coygen quarry near Laugharne, Torcoed quarry near Crwbi and Garn Bica quarry near Porthyrhyd, Foelfach quarry near Cynwyl Elfed, Ty Howel quarry near Lampeter, Pennant quarry at Five Roads and Coed Moelion quarry near Pontyberem each exploit sandstones. Igneous and metamorphic rocks are quarried at Garn Wen quarry near Crymych. Sand and gravel are worked at Llwynjack quarry near Llandovery whilst marine sand & gravel is landed at Burry Port.

Coal mining and opencasting for coal in the southeast of the county were formerly key parts of the Carmarthenshire economy though all activity has now ceased.

Rottenstone for use in the metal polishing industry was worked on a small scale during the nineteenth century along the outcrop of the Upper Limestone Shale in the Black Mountain area. Silica sand was worked from open pits beside the A4069 and also in the vicinity of Cefn Carn Fadog a little further east. It was used in the manufacture of refractory bricks until the middle of the twentieth century.

=== Building stone ===
Sandstone was quarried for use in buildings and walls at numerous sites around the county, virtually all of which are now abandoned. An Ordovician limestone was exploited at Llandowror at St Clears whilst the D. bifidus beds were worked at Tre-vaughan near Carmarthen. The Llandeilo flags were worked at Llandeilo and Ludlow age sandstones emerged from Cwar Glas beside the Afon Sawdde. The tilestones were quarried for use as roofing material at numerous locations along their very linear outcrop, the numerous workings giving rise to a former name of these rocks - the 'Long Quarry Formation'. Key locations included Mynydd Myddfai quarries and Cilmaenllwyd in what is now the national park and also Pen-y-waen, Gelli-groes and Onen Fawr outside of it. Those opened up in the Old Red Sandstone include Pen-y-back quarry, south of Whitland, Cil-yr-ychen, Cincoed and Llyn y Beddau, southwest of Trap.

A quarry at Felindref near Crwbin worked the Carboniferous Limestone for building stone. Lower Carboniferous sandstones were worked for flags at Pontyates and Tan-y-lan quarries just north of Pontyates. The Twrch Sandstone was worked at Garn Bica, southwest of Trap. Pennant Sandstone was quarried at Dan-y-quarry south of Pontyates, at Craig-capel and nearby Cwm Capel quarries, at Burry Port and at Furnace and Pen-y-fan quarries at Llanelli. Other quarries working upper Carboniferous sandstones included those at Llandybie, and at Nant Melyn and Craig Derlwyn at Brynaman.

=== Metal ores ===
Lead and zinc ores were mined on a small scale during the nineteenth century in the area around Myddfai. Lead and zinc ore in the form of galena and sphalerite were also worked at Rhandirmwyn in the upper Towy valley. Both localities may be considered as southerly extensions of the Central Wales Orefield, centred on northeast Ceredigion. It has been suggested that the sulphur-rich mineralising fluids responsible for the formation of these orefields may have been associated with the Acadian Orogeny. Gold has been recovered from mines at Dolaucothi since at least the Iron Age and the industry was developed further by the Romans. The mine enjoyed a new lease of life from the late nineteenth century through until 1940.

== Geoconservation ==
There are a number of SSSIs in the county and numerous RIGS have been identified. The Carmel National Nature Reserve protects the only turlough in Wales. Part of the east of the county falls within the Brecon Beacons National Park, this western part of which is also designated as Fforest Fawr UNESCO Global Geopark.

== See also ==
- Geology of the United Kingdom
- Geology of Wales
