= Coastline of Wales =

Sea-bounded areas of Wales

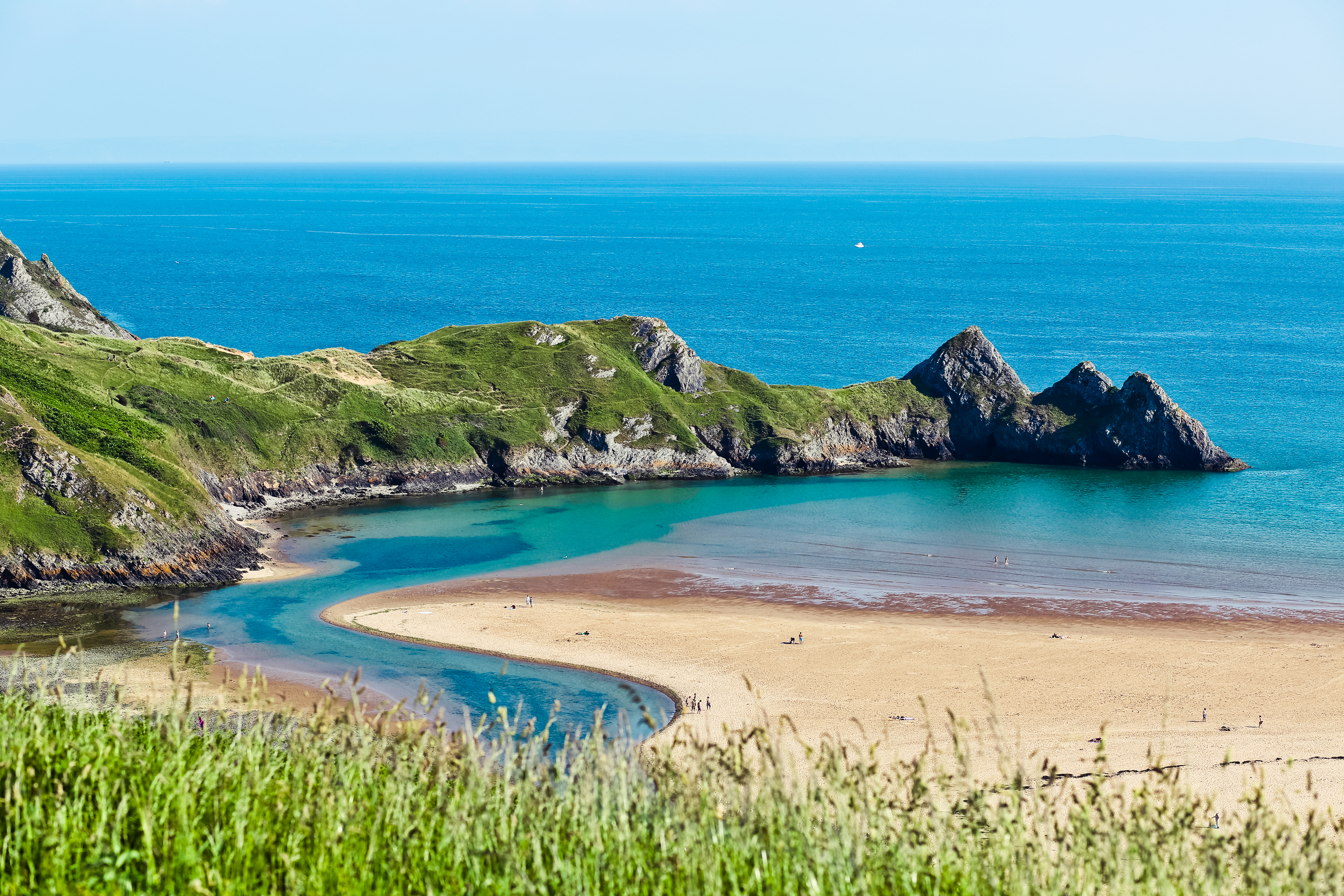
Three Cliffs Bay, on the Gower Peninsula, Swansea, in South Wales.

Natural Resources Wales sub-aqua video survey; 2020

The coastline of Wales extends from the English border at Chepstow westwards to Pembrokeshire then north to Anglesey and back eastwards to the English border once again near Flint. Its character is determined by multiple factors, including the local geology and geological processes active during and subsequent to the last ice age, its relative exposure to or shelter from waves, tidal variation and the history of human settlement and development which varies considerably from one place to another. The majority of the coast east of Cardiff in the south, and of Llandudno in the north, is flat whilst that to the west is more typically backed by cliffs. The cliffs are a mix of sandstones, shales and limestones, the erosion of which provides material for beach deposits. Of the twenty-two principal areas which deliver local government in Wales, sixteen have a coastline, though that of Powys consists only of a short section of tidal river some distance from the open sea. Its length (including Anglesey) has been estimated at 1,680 miles (2,700 km). (Note: The measured length of any coastline may vary considerably, depending on the method of measurement; see coastline paradox)

== Geological history ==
Parts of the Welsh coast are formed by bedrock of Precambrian age, notably along the north coast of Llŷn and Pembrokeshire and parts of Anglesey. These oldest rocks are generally igneous or metamorphic in nature and typically hard-wearing. Much of the cliffed coast of Cardigan Bay is in turbidites and allied rocks of Ordovician and Silurian age. Devonian age Old Red Sandstone provides the coastal scenery around much of Milford Haven whilst low cliffs of Carboniferous Limestone forms the coast in parts of Anglesey. At some other localities along the north coast such as the Ormes at Llandudno, cliffs in the same rock are considerably higher. The same limestone characterises much of the southern coast of Pembrokeshire where the flat-lying strata produces sheer cliffs though in Gower, the same limestone strata were more intensely faulted and folded during the Variscan orogeny, and the cliffs are accordingly more variable. Limited outcrops of Triassic sandstones and mudstones occur on the south coast. They are typically overlain by flat-lying Jurassic limestone which forms much of the coast of the Vale of Glamorgan; these well-jointed vertical cliffs are more prone to collapse and hence coastal retreat is relatively rapid.

In common with other parts of Britain and Ireland, Wales has experienced significant changes in sea level in the last few tens of thousands of years, largely attributable to the waxing and waning of ice sheets during successive glacial periods, the last of which ended only 11,500 years ago. At the height of the last ice age, the volumes of water locked away as ice resulted in a drop in global sea level which has been estimated at between 105 and 123 m (344 and 404 ft) and a corresponding change in the position of the coast. During this period of lowered sea level, the lower sections of many rivers were rejuvenated and they cut down into their beds as evidenced by the buried channels of the Usk at Newport and the Wye at Chepstow which are more than 20 and 17 metres (66 and 56 ft) below sea level respectively. The Flandrian transgression associated with the melting of the ice-sheets has brought the sea level to that recorded over human history, with the larger part of that rise achieved prior to 6000 years ago. Within Cardigan Bay, three 'sarnau' or causeways - Sarn Badrig, Sarn Gynfelyn and Sarn y Bwch - extend out from the coast for several miles, parts being exposed at low spring tide. These are interpreted as medial moraines left by ice moving west off the Cambrian Mountains during the last ice age. The position and character of the modern coastline owes much to the manner in which sea level has adjusted since.

Peat deposits and tree stumps are exposed in the intertidal zone in many places along the Welsh coast. They date from a time of lower sea level around 8000 years ago. The traditional Welsh legend of the drowned land of Cantre'r Gwaelod has been linked to these localities. A stormier climate between about 1300 and 1700 led to large quantities of sand being blown onshore and increasing the size of the various dune systems.

== Tidal range ==
Cardigan Bay experiences the lowest tidal range along the Welsh coast (less than 3 metres; 9.8 ft) whilst the Bristol Channel coast experiences the highest (up to 14m). Indeed, the tidal range within the funnel-shaped estuary is the third or fourth highest in the world. A result is that the intertidal zone is larger than might otherwise be the case.

=== Shore platforms ===
'Shore platforms' are developed along rocky coasts and are commonly referred to as 'wave-cut platforms' though that name ignores the contribution that other processes may contribute to their development. They are well-developed along parts of the Welsh coast - for example, south of Aberystwyth and along the Glamorgan Heritage Coast.

== Physical features ==
The Welsh coast is diverse with both sandy and rocky bays frequently interspersed with estuaries and headlands.

=== Estuaries ===
There are a large number of estuaries around the Welsh coast. Two of the largest are shared with England; that of the Dee in the northeast and of the Severn in the southeast. The Milford Haven Waterway which penetrates deep into Pembrokeshire is notable as an outstanding example of a ria, a river valley which has been drowned by a rise in sea level. The estuaries of the Towy, Loughor and Usk also owe their origin to rising sea levels in the post-glacial period. The Severn, Dee and Clwyd estuaries experience tidal bores under certain conditions. Estuaries typically provide ecologically rich habitats but they have also been attractive for human settlement and port development.

=== Peninsulas and headlands ===
The county of Pembrokeshire forms the largest peninsula in Wales and contains within it, several smaller peninsulas such as the Dale peninsula and St David's peninsula; the headland of Pen Dal-aderyn at its extremity is the westernmost point of the Welsh mainland. Second in size is the Llŷn Peninsula in the northwest and third is the Gower Peninsula in the south. Like most of Gower, the Great Orme at Llandudno which is the most notable headland on the north coast, is formed from relatively erosion-resistant Carboniferous Limestone. Other notable headlands include Lavernock Point, south of Cardiff, and Worm's Head which is the westernmost point of Gower. The northeasternmost point of Wales is provided by Point of Ayr.

=== Bays ===
Cardigan Bay is much the largest bay on the Welsh coast but dozens of others are found at a variety of scales.

=== Dune systems ===
Major dune systems occur at intervals around most of the Welsh coast. The majority are "bay dunes" as commonly found around the Pembrokeshire coast. Some, known as "hindshore dune systems", occur where the prevailing wind has driven sand inland as at Newborough Warren in southwest Anglesey whilst others such as that at Whiteford Burrows in northwest Gower have developed along sandy promontories and are referred to as "spit dune systems". The system at Morfa Harlech has also grown behind a spit; this one is developed across the mouth of the Dwyryd estuary. Several form the core of national nature reserves such as those at Kenfig Burrows and Merthyr-mawr Warren to the north and east of Porthcawl respectively.

=== Salt marshes ===
Salt marshes are found in many areas. Amongst the most significant are those on the southern side of the Loughor estuary on Gower's north coast. Significant areas of salt marsh are also found within the Dee estuary and between Harlech and Porthmadog though, here as elsewhere, reclamation of large parts of the marsh have taken place in the past for use as farmland.

=== Islands ===
Anglesey is easily the largest Welsh island, separated from the mainland in the northwest of the country by the Menai Strait (Welsh: afon Menai). Smaller islands off Anglesey include Wales' second largest, Holy Island (Ynys Gybi) and Puffin Island or Priestholm (Ynys Seiriol). Anglesey is connected to the mainland by two bridges and Holy Island is connected by both a bridge and a double causeway. Llanddwyn Island is only separated from mainland Anglesey at high spring tides.

Off the coast of Llŷn are Bardsey Island (Ynys Enlli), St Tudwal's Island East and St Tudwal's Island West. Off the Ceredigion coast are Cardigan Island and the diminutive Ynys Lochtyn. Wales' third, fourth, fifth and sixth largest islands are scattered around the Pembrokeshire coast; respectively Skomer, Ramsey Island, Caldey Island and Skokholm. Others in this area include Midland Isle (a.k.a. Middleholm) and the tidal islands of Gateholm, Ynys Micel, Sheep Island and St Catherine's Island. St Margaret's Island is linked to Caldey at low tide. Off Gower are the tidal islands of Worms Head, Middle Head and Mumbles Head. In the southeast, Sully Island is linked to the Glamorgan coast at low tide whilst Flat Holm is 3 miles off the coast at the east end of the Bristol Channel and is the southernmost part of Wales. Wales' most isolated island, and its westernmost island, is Grassholm, 6 3/4 miles (10.9 km) west of Skomer though the wave-washed rocks supporting the Smalls Lighthouse at more than twice that distance from Skomer are the westernmost part of Wales.

== Settlements ==
Much of the population of Wales live in coastal communities; its three largest cities, Cardiff, Swansea and Newport are on the coast.

=== Ports ===
The two largest passenger ports are Holyhead and Fishguard which are the eastern termini of the two passenger ferry routes across the Irish Sea from Dublin and Rosslare in Ireland. Milford Haven, often said to be one of the finest deep water harbours in the world, is one of the UK's major oil terminals.

=== Resorts ===
A number of seaside resorts developed during the Victorian era including Rhyl, Prestatyn, Colwyn Bay, Llandudno, Tenby, Porthcawl and Mumbles. At least eleven pleasure piers were constructed at Welsh seaside resorts between 1840 and 1900. Only those at Aberystwyth, Bangor, Beaumaris, Colwyn Bay, Llandudno, Mumbles and Penarth remain standing today. Those at Rhyl, Tenby and Rhos-on-Sea were lost in 1973, 1953 and 1954 respectively. A former pier at Aberavon is now a breakwater.

== Communications ==
Historically, many Welsh coastal communities relied upon transport by sea but railways arrived in the middle of the nineteenth century and the road network was steadily improved.

=== Sea transport ===
The Port of Holyhead is the departure point for Stena Line and Irish ferries bound for Dublin on Ireland's east coast. Services were started in 1821. A ferry service to Rosslare in southeast Ireland from the port of Fishguard began in 1906. Historically there have also been passenger ferry services from both Swansea and Milford Haven to Ireland. A seasonal excursion service has also operated from Penarth Pier to Ilfracombe in Devon and Clevedon in North Somerset. A similar service has operated on occasions from Llandudno Pier to Douglas on the Isle of Man. Numerous lighthouses have been constructed around the Welsh coast to assist with safe navigation of vessels.

=== Road transport ===
Communities along the northeast coast are linked by the A548 between Chester and Abergele. Westwards from Abergele the A55 North Wales Expressway parallels much of the coast as far as its crossing of the Menai Strait just to the west of Bangor. The A487 runs along the southern shore of the Menai Strait to Caernarfon before heading inland. The A497 and A499 serve a variety of coastal communities on both the northern and southern coasts of Llyn, as far east as Penrhyndeudraeth. The A496 is the coast road between Maentwrog and Dolgellau whilst the A493 performs that function south from there to Machynlleth. The A487 once again becomes the coast road at Machynlleth running southwest all the way to St Davids via Aberystwyth, Cardigan and Fishguard, albeit some way inland of the coast itself in many areas.

=== Rail transport ===
The North Wales Coast Line from Crewe via Chester to Holyhead has stops at Connah's Quay, Flint, Prestatyn, Rhyl, Abergele, Colwyn Bay, Llandudno Junction railway station, Conwy, Penmaenmawr, Llanfairfechan and Bangor before the line cuts across the middle of Anglesey to the port of Holyhead. A short branch line serves Deganwy and Llandudno. It opened in 1850.

The Cambrian Line running west from Shrewsbury reaches the coast at Machynlleth. A few miles west of the town it splits at Dovey Junction with a northern branch running via Aberdyfi, Barmouth, Harlech, Porthmadog, Criccieth and numerous lesser stops along the Cardigan Bay coast to Pwllheli. The southerly branch calls at Borth on its way to Aberystwyth.

The South Wales Main Line first approaches the coast at Pyle and then runs via stations at Port Talbot and Neath to Swansea. The West Wales Line onwards from Swansea runs west along the coastal belt via Llanelli and Burry Port before cutting inland at Ferryside for Carmarthen. Its final destination is the ferry port of Fishguard. One branch line serves Haverfordwest and Milford Haven whilst another serves the coastal towns of Saundersfoot, Tenby, Pembroke and Pembroke Dock.

== Industry ==
There are many examples of limekilns established at quaysides around the Welsh coast, dating from a period when it was most convenient to transport limestone to these locations by sea. Lime produced at these locations would be used in connection with local agriculture and building.

=== Quarrying ===
There are a number of now mostly abandoned coastal quarry workings where the stone was exported by sea. Granite quarries at Trefor/Y Eifl and at Penmaenmawr exported most of their production by sea. A refractory brickworks established in the nineteenth century at Porth Wen on Anglesey was in operation intermittently until 1949. Raynes Quarry at Llanddulas operated by Cemex UK produces limestone and remains in production. Coal mining took place at Little Haven and other coastal localities around the Pembrokeshire Coalfield.

=== Other industries ===
Other industries have been set up along the coast to take advantage of transport of both raw materials and finished products by sea. Shipbuilding and repair has been a major industry. Port Talbot is home to the largest integrated steelworks in the UK (2017) and relies on marine transport to retain its economic competitiveness.

== Energy production ==
The use of tidal currents to produce electricity is currently being considered at several sites along the Bristol Channel such as Swansea Bay. A tide mill at Carew in Pembrokeshire used for grinding corn dates from about 1801. There are wind turbines at several coastal locations to take advantage of the more dependable winds available in such places. In addition there are numerous windfarms off the North Wales coast such as that at North Hoyle which began operation in 2003. Nearby is Gwynt y Môr, the fifth largest offshore windfarm in the world when it was completed in 2015. There is a nuclear power station at Wylfa on Anglesey's north coast. A conventional coal-burning power station was established at Aberthaw on the Glamorgan coast but it closed in early 2020. There have been two power stations at Uskmouth, one demolished, the other converted to burning alternative materials.

== Defence ==
During the 13th and 14th centuries, King Edward I of England established a series of fortified towns around the periphery of Gwynedd, at Conwy, Beaumaris, Caernarfon and Harlech. These castles and town walls have enjoyed status as a World Heritage Site since 1986. Other mediaeval coastal fortresses include those at Flint and Criccieth in North Wales, Aberystwyth and Cardigan in Ceredigion, Carew, Pembroke, Manorbier and Tenby in Pembrokeshire, Laugharne, Llansteffan and Kidwelly in Carmarthenshire. Loughor, Oystermouth and Swansea in the traditional county of Glamorgan and Newport, Caldicot and Chepstow in the traditional county of Monmouthshire.

Many dozens of wartime coastal lookouts were put in place during the Second World War.

=== Modern military presence on the coast ===
The one-time RAF station at Aberporth in Ceredigion was formerly used for missile testing over Cardigan Bay. The site is still in use for research and development in connection with military purposes. The Castlemartin Training Area within the Pembrokeshire National Park is owned by the MoD and forms a part of the Defence Training Estate. Further east is a facility at Pendine operated by Qinetiq. There are marine danger zones established over parts of Cardigan and Carmarthen bays in connection with these establishments.

== Protected areas ==
Much of the Welsh coast is protected for its landscape quality and/or its significance for wildlife. The Pembrokeshire Coast National Park protects almost the entire coast of Pembrokeshire under the provisions of the National Parks and Access to the Countryside Act 1949 (as subsequently amended) and the Snowdonia National Park also extends along sections of the coast of Gwynedd and Conwy. Three other parts of the coast are protected as AONBs, established under the same legislation as that for national parks; these are Gower, Llŷn and Anglesey. Designation of some sections as heritage coast provides further opportunity for the conservation and promotion of the coastal strip. The cliffed section of the Glamorgan coast together with Gower are similarly designated as are the larger parts of the Pembrokeshire and Ceredigion coasts. In the north, the coasts of Llŷn and Anglesey are protected long with the Great Orme. For a full list see: Heritage coast#Wales.

Wildlife designations include SSSIs, SACs and SPAs. Some are managed as national nature reserves or else as local nature reserves. Bodies such as the National Trust, the RSPB and the various wildlife trusts have a significant role in this regard. The National Trust owns and manages 157 miles of the coast including much of the saltmarsh on Gower's north coast and the western part of its southern coast between Oxwich Bay and Rhossili Bay. Also in its care are fragments of the coasts of Anglesey and Llŷn and parts of the coasts of Ceredigion and of Pembrokeshire, notably around the St Davids peninsula, Marloes and Stackpole. The Severn Estuary SSSI extends from Lavernock Point to Chepstow, consisting largely of foreshore. Parts of it are also protected as an SPA, SAC and Ramsar site. Newport Wetlands is a recently established reserve, created by way of compensation for the loss of tidal mudflats when Cardiff Bay was impounded.

== Recreational access ==
The Wales Coast Path is an 870-mile (1,400 km) long trail which follows almost the entire coastline. Opened in 2012, it incorporates pre-existing paths such as the Pembrokeshire Coast Path which had been established as a National Trail around almost the entire 186-mile (299 km) length of Pembrokeshire's coastline in 1970. Continuing northwards from the National Trail is the 65-mile (105 km) Ceredigion Coast Path which opened in 2008. The 91-mile (146 km) Llŷn Coastal Path which was opened in 2006 predates the establishment of the Wales Coastal Path as does the North Wales Path between Bangor and Prestatyn. The latter which is 60-mile (97 km) long often takes a more inland route than that of the Wales Coastal Path.

== See also ==
- Coastline of the United Kingdom
