= Afon Clarach =

River in Ceredigion, Wales

Coordinates: 52°26′08″N 4°04′47″W

River Clarach
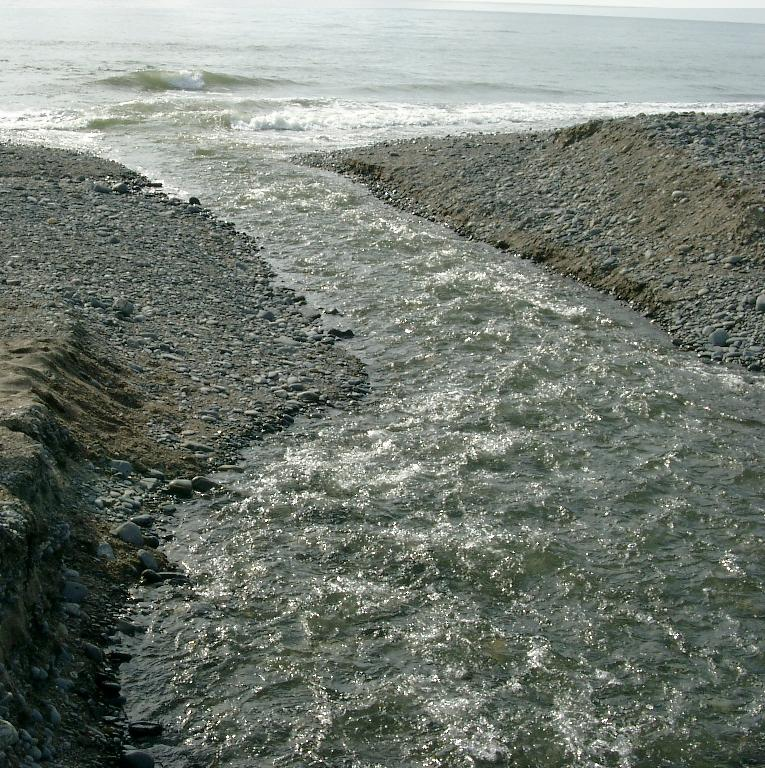
- Afon Clarach meets the sea at Clarach Bay

Location
- Country: Wales
- Region: Ceredigion

Physical characteristics
- Source: Capel Dewi, Aberystwyth
- Mouth
  - location: Clarach Bay

Afon Clarach (Welsh pronunciation: [ˈklaraχ]; also known as the River Clarach) is a small river discharging into Cardigan Bay north of Aberystwyth. It flows through a largely agricultural and forested landscape except in its lowest reaches where its banks are crowded with holiday developments. The Clarach is formed at the confluence of the Afon Stewi and Nant Seilo at Penrhyncoch, with both their headwaters originating in low hills at the edge of the Plynlimon range. The course of the river takes it past the Institute of Biological, Environmental and Rural Sciences (a part of Aberystwyth University), and the village of Bow Street. Between Bow Street and Llangorwen, the river is joined by the Bow Street Brook.

In past centuries, the upper reaches of the river have been affected by lead and silver mining and the quality of the river has suffered as a result. There is some organic pollution from diffuse agricultural inputs and from the discharge of treated sewage from the Bow Street sewage treatment works.

The river discharges into the sea over the beach at Clarach Bay thus limiting the population of migratory fish able to access the river. Consequently, Atlantic salmon and sea-trout are rare, however brown trout, brook lampreys, millers thumb and stone loach are commonly found.

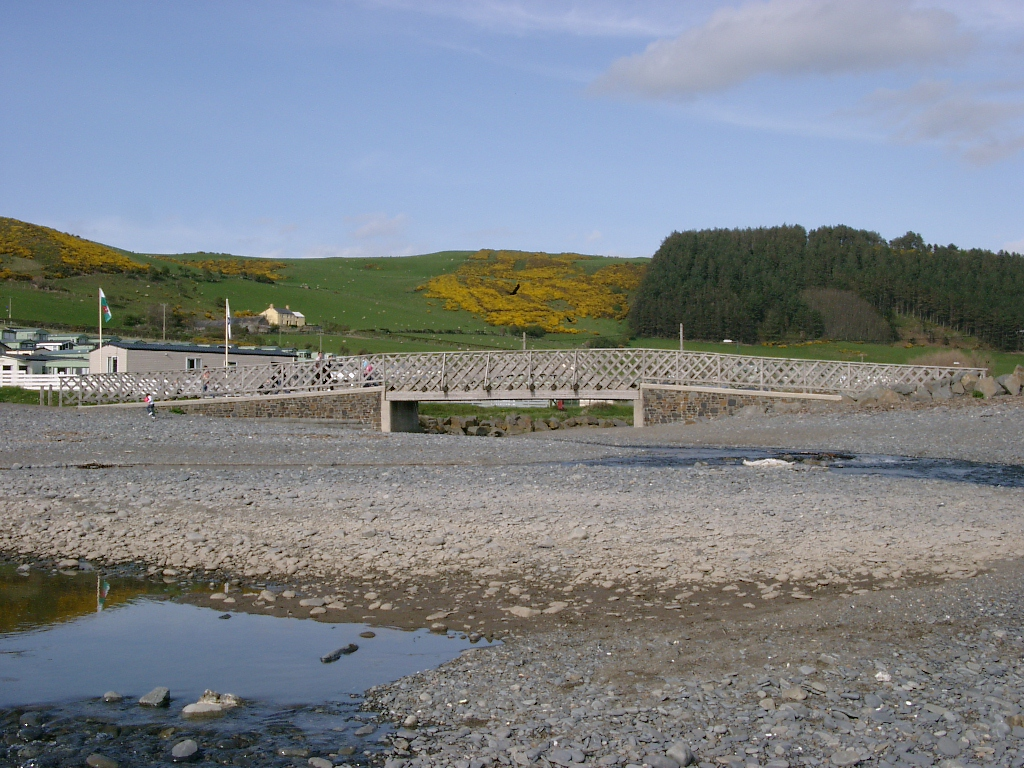
Bridge over the Mouth of the River Clarach
