= Afon Brân (Llangadog) =

River in West Wales

Coordinates: 51°56′20″N 3°53′54″W

The Afon Brân is a river flowing in Carmarthenshire, West Wales. One of two left-bank tributaries of the River Towy by this name, this is the lower of the two, entering the Towy to the west of Llangadog and having its source at just under 400m above sea level on Mynydd Myddfai about 9 miles to the east. For the first few miles it flows within the Brecon Beacons National Park, and passing by the village of Myddfai. Its flow is supplemented by the Afon Clydach on its left bank and the Afon Ydw on its right bank. Llwynywormwood, owned by the Duchy of Cornwall and former occasional residence of the Charles, Prince of Wales, sits beside the latter.
