= Gilwern Hill =

Gilwern Hill may refer to

- Gilwern Hill, Monmouthshire, a hill near the village of Gilwern
- Gilwern Hill, Powys, a hill east of Llandrindod Wells
