= Wallog =

Beach in Ceredigion, Wales

Coordinates: 52.455°N 4.074°W

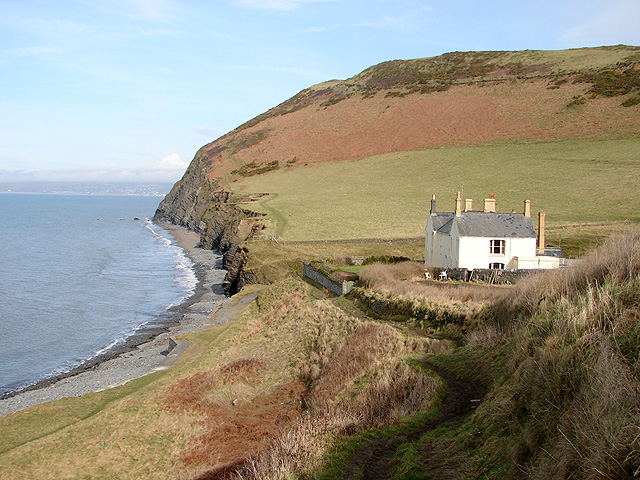

- Location within Ceredigion
- Principal area: Ceredigion
- Country: Wales
- Sovereign state: United Kingdom
- Police: Dyfed-Powys
- Fire: Mid and West Wales
- Ambulance: Welsh

Wallog is a beach on the coast of Cardigan Bay north of Aberystwyth between Clarach Bay and Borth in the county of Ceredigion, Mid-Wales.

A shingle spit named Sarn Gynfelyn originates from here.

An old disused lime kiln is located at the end of this moraine.

The lime was shipped into this spot, treated and then spread over the lands of the Wallog estate.

Wallog lies on the route of the Ceredigion Coast Path.

Although there is no direct road to Wallog beach, it can be reached by a public footpath, which follows a green lane to the beach, where seals and other wildlife are abundant.
