= Llangorwen =

Village in Ceredigion, Wales

Coordinates: 52.455°N 4.074°W

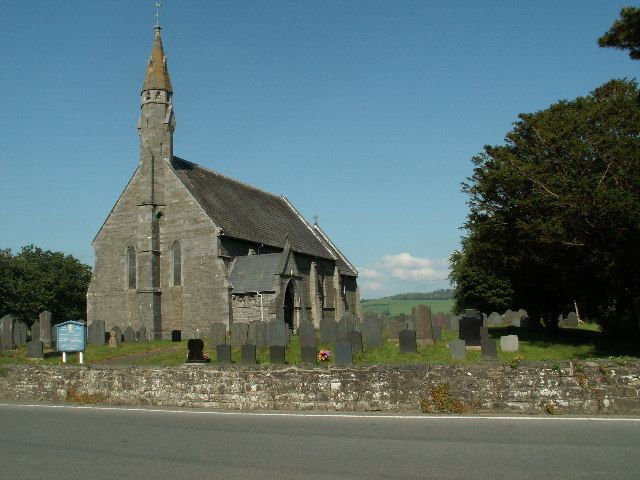
- All Saints' church

- Location within Ceredigion
- Principal area: Ceredigion
- Country: Wales
- Sovereign state: United Kingdom
- Police: Dyfed-Powys
- Fire: Mid and West Wales
- Ambulance: Welsh
- UK Parliament: Ceredigion Preseli

Llangorwen is a village located in the county of Ceredigion, Mid-Wales. Close to Clarach Bay and a mile north of Aberystwyth.

The Church of All Saints just south of the village, is a grade II* listed building.

Jutting out to sea the Sarn Gynfelyn shingle spit is located a few kilometres north of Llangorwen.
