= Worm's Head =

Headland in Rhossili, Wales

Coordinates: 51.5641°N 4.3198°W

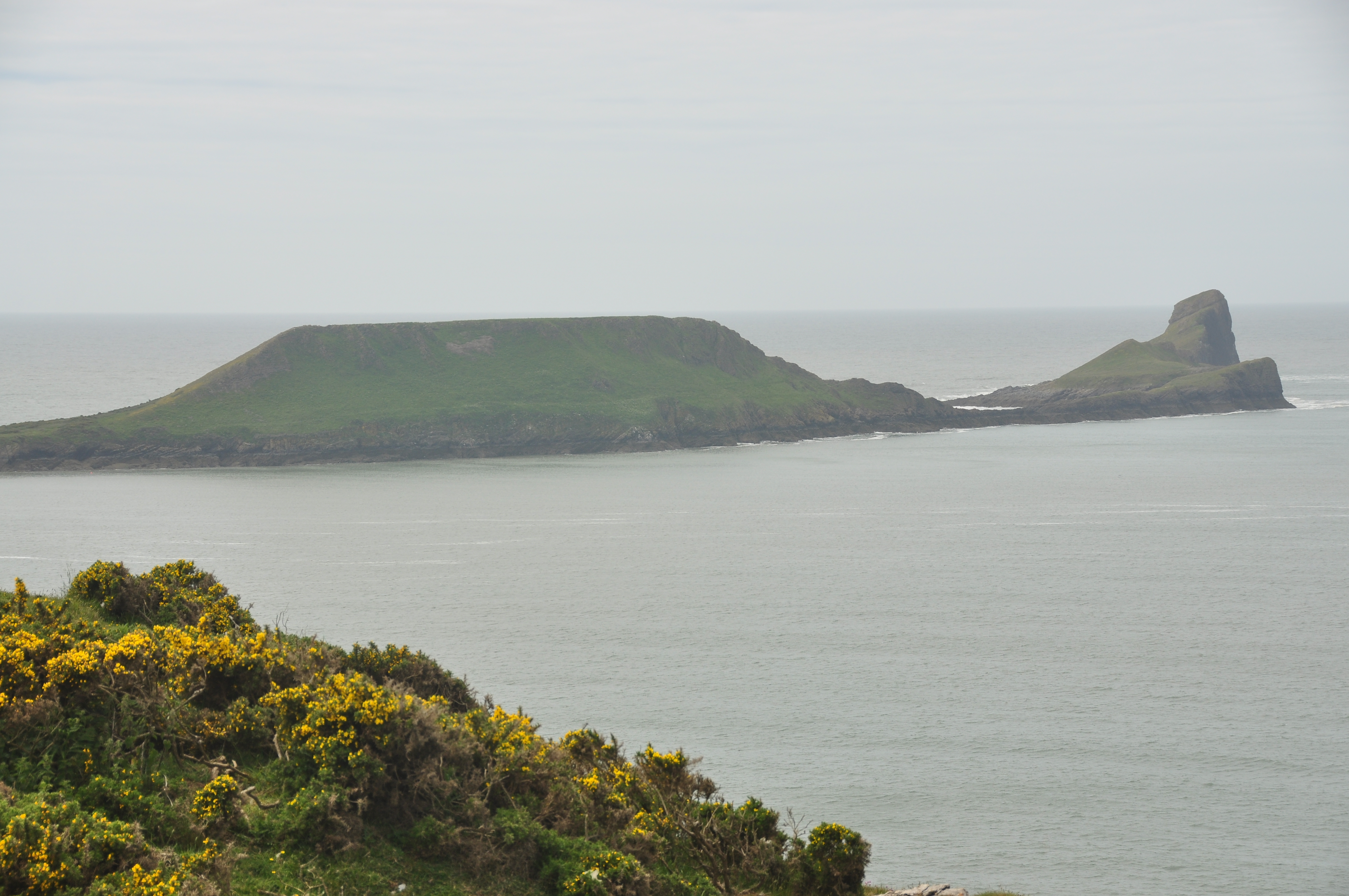
Worm's Head, viewed from above Rhossili Bay Beach.

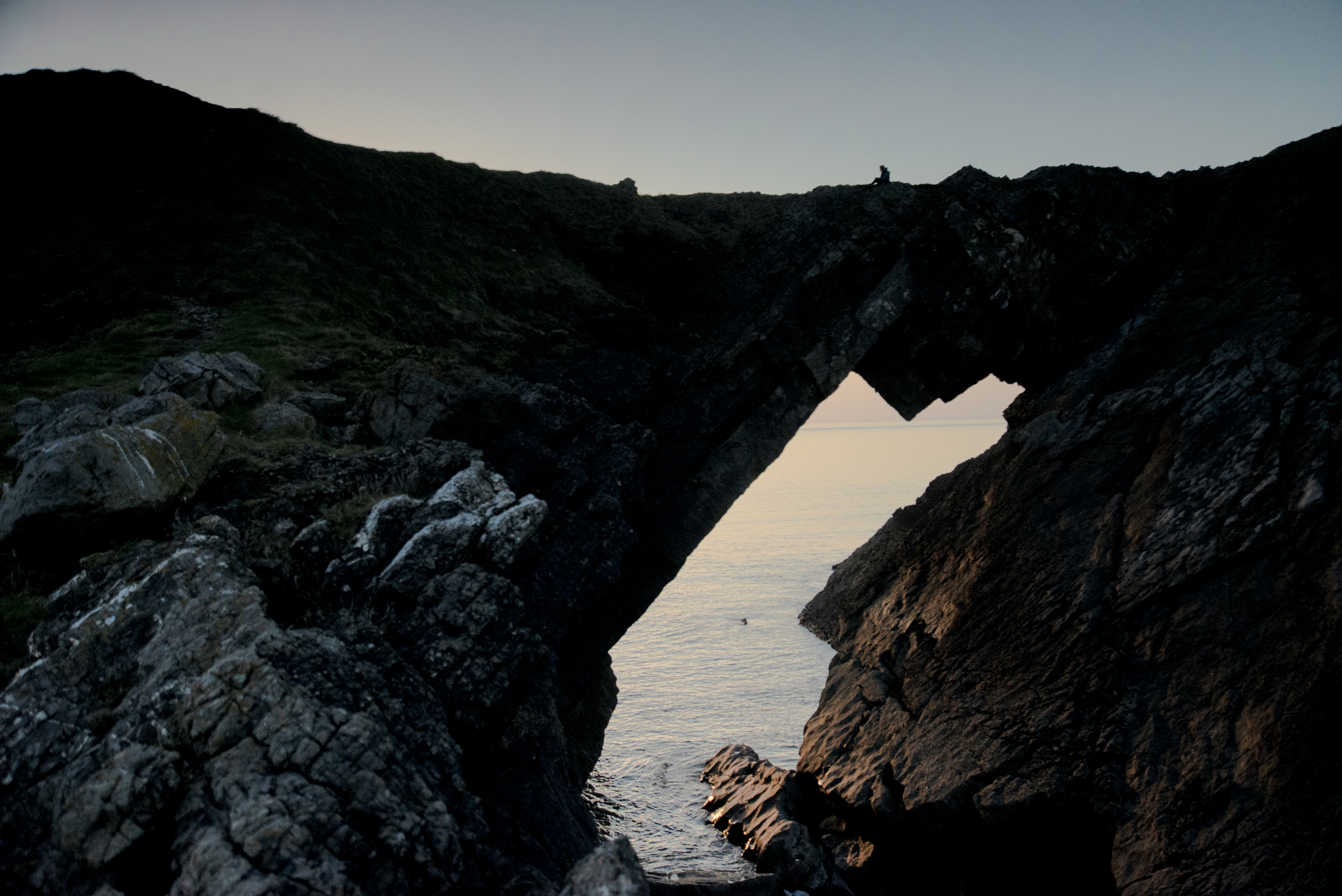
The Devil's Bridge

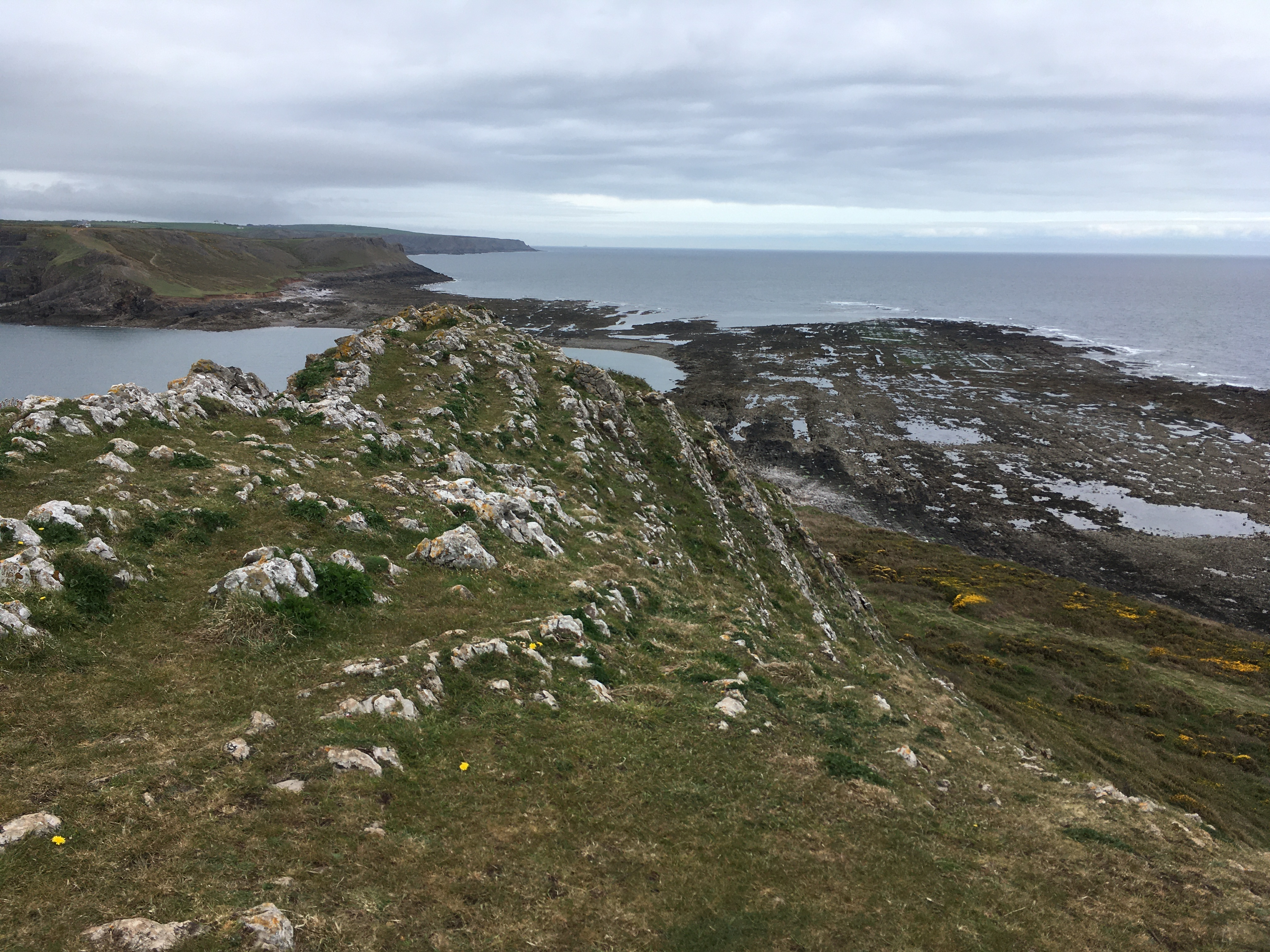
Looking back toward the tidal path between the mainland and Inner Head.

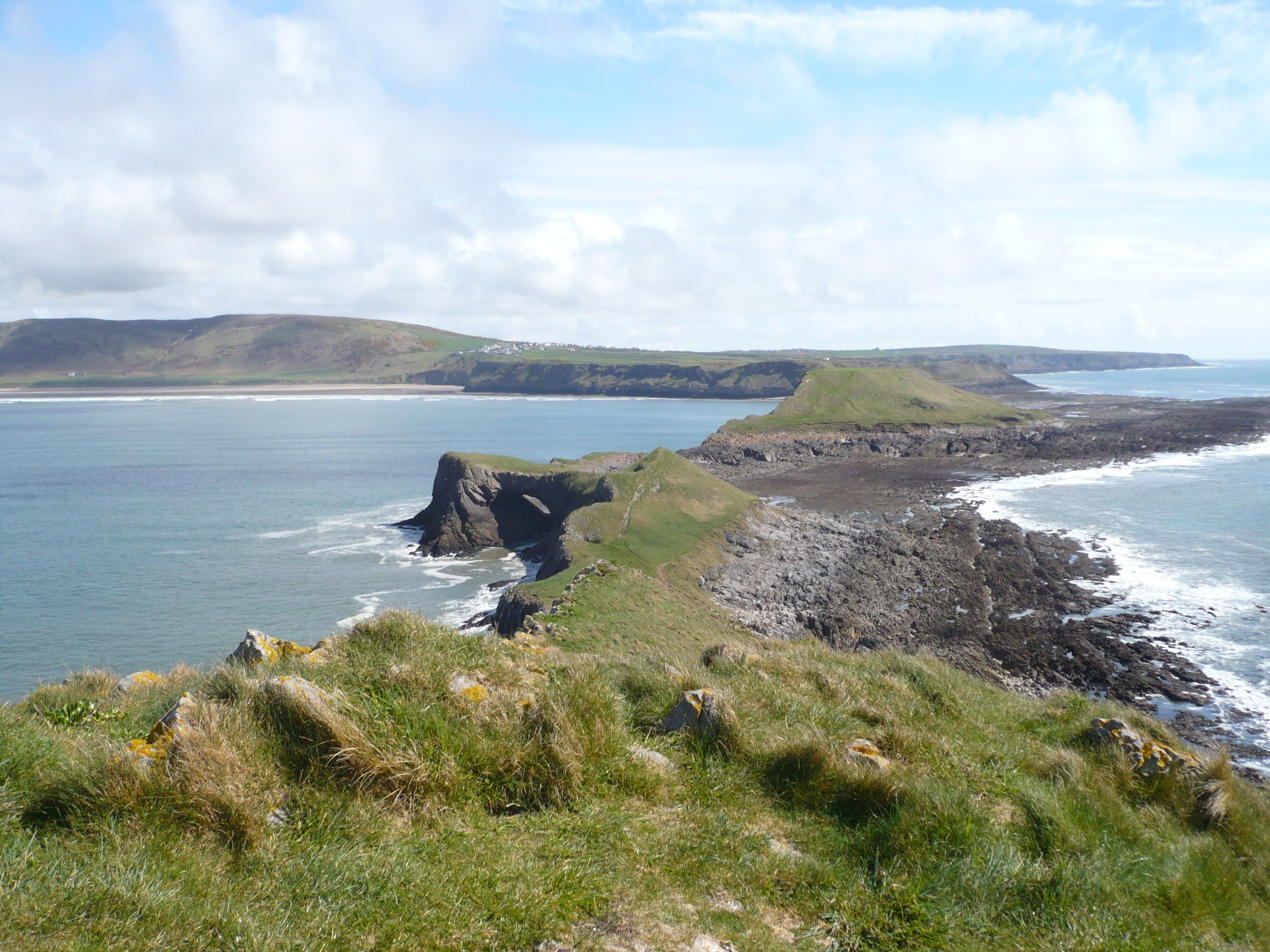
Looking back towards the mainland from the Outer Head

Worm's Head (Welsh: Pen Pyrod) is a headland, at Rhossili, part of the City and County of Swansea, Wales. It is the furthest westerly point of the Gower Peninsula. The name Worm's Head is derived from an Old English word 'wyrm' for 'sea serpent'. The headland of carboniferous limestone comprises three islands: the Inner Head, the Middle Head which features a collapsed sea cave which is known as the Devil's Bridge, and the Outer Head. In total, it is approximately one mile long. The Inner Head is up to 200 yards wide. Worm's Head is only accessible on foot for 2 1/2 hours either side of low tide, fatal to attempt to wade or swim to when the causeway from the mainland is flooded.

The poet Dylan Thomas initially described the Worm's Head as "the very promontory of depression" and was forced once to spend the night on the Head after being trapped by the tide.

Visitors are still caught out by the incoming tide and, in September 2020, seven Swansea University students were rescued by the local RNLI lifeboat after getting stranded on Worm's Head by the incoming tide. In January 2025, during Storm Éowyn, another seven students were rescued from the island.
