= Myddfai Steep Belt =

Geological structure in mid Wales

The Myddfai Steep Belt is a geological structure which affects rocks of Silurian and Devonian age in mid Wales. It extends for tens of miles across country from near Carmarthen northeastwards via Mynydd Myddfai, Mynydd Bach Trecastell and Mynydd Epynt to the vicinity of Llangammarch Wells. Within this linear zone, the rock beds have been tilted steeply to the southeast. The folding took place in late Silurian to early Devonian times. This structure gives rise to a series of landscape features along its length, not least the steep northwest-facing scarps of the hills and ranges mentioned above. Indeed, the feature can be seen as a significant lineament in aerial and satellite views of Wales.

The Steep Belt effectively marks the southeastern edge of the intensely folded region of the Caledonian Orogenic Belt in central Wales. A series of major folds and faults affect the Ordovician and Silurian rocks to its northwest whilst folding and faulting of the Devonian rocks to its southeast is much more subdued. The Steep Belt forms a part of a much longer feature which extends from Pembrokeshire as far as Shropshire and Cheshire and is sometimes referred to as the Pontesford Lineament. The Lineament includes the Pontesford-Linley Fault, the Clun Forest Disturbance and the Red Rock Fault Zone which marks the eastern edge of the Cheshire basin.
