= Geology of South Wales =

Overview of geology in South Wales

Geology of Wales and South West England; map

South Wales is an area with many features of outstanding interest to geologists, who have for long used the area for University field trips.

This varied and accessible region has provided a written record of geological interest that dates to the 12th century, when Giraldus Cambrensis noted pyritous shales near Newport. Some of the first published representations of fossils were of fossil plants from coal measures near Neath (Gibson late 17th century). The British geologists Adam Sedgwick and Roderick Murchison did fundamentally important work in South Wales on Old Red Sandstone and the underlying rocks. The first volume of memoirs (1846) published by the Geological Survey contained a conspectus of the geology of South Wales that set a template for all future work.

Significant discoveries continue to be made. For instance, in Carmarthenshire, in the late 1970s, John Cope detected a small area of Precambrian and Cambrian rocks. Other parts of South Wales, however, have not seen a Geological Survey officer since the mid-19th century. The geology of south Wales was central to the massive contribution Wales made to the Industrial Revolution.

Several successive periods are represented, including all of the Palaeozoic periods. Pembrokeshire has outcrops of both Precambrian and Cambrian (542-488 million years ago) rocks. A notable feature of the Ordovician system (488-444 million years old) is a major subsidence area, or basin, which later filled with substantial thicknesses of mostly sandy and muddy sediment. The line of the shallower continental shelf area, to the south-east, ran approximately from the Long Mynd (in Shropshire) to Haverfordwest in Pembrokeshire. Some volcanic action also occurred. This thick sedimentary deposition continued into the Silurian period (444-416 million years old). Silurian volcanicity led to production of lavas at localised sites such as Skomer Island.

Silurian rocks are widely distributed in south Wales and are well displayed on the Cardiganshire coast. The Silurian and earlier rocks were folded, faulted, and distorted several times, notably during the late Ordovician, and late Silurian, by which time the area had begun to rise above sea level as mountain ranges were uplifted to the north-west. This was caused by the collision of a proto-North America ("Laurentia") and the present southern Britain ("Eastern Avalonia"). The intervening sea, the Iapetus Ocean, closed as a result of plate tectonic movements, similar to those that now close the Mediterranean Sea between Europe and Africa.

The succeeding Devonian period (416-359 million years ago) saw mostly alluvial deposits ("Old Red Sandstone"), which were interrupted by major uplift. Following this, the land subsided again in the Carboniferous period (359-299 million years ago). In the early Carboniferous period, limestones were deposited on a continental shelf, which deepened towards the south where there was a major sea area. During earth movements caused by the approach of a continent from the south, sea shallowing led to thick alluvial and coastal plain sediments (see below) containing economic developments of coal. Carboniferous Limestone outcrops occur in south Pembrokeshire, the Gower Peninsula, the Vale of Glamorgan and around the edge of the coalfield.

At the end of the Carboniferous, during Permian (299-251 my ago) time, Wales is thought to have been a landmass. Only in late Triassic (251-200 my ago) times did deposition return, with coarse-grained screes forming around a series of low but rugged hills. Continuing deposition led to the formation of the early Jurassic deposits of mudstones and muddy limestones (the "Lias"). Deposits later than this are almost completely absent, although the Chalk sea probably covered most of Wales between 100 and 66 million years ago. Any such later deposits have been eroded away.

One of the geological rarities of south Wales is the coastline of St Brides Major at Ogmore-by-Sea and Southerndown. Its cliffs are composed partly of earliest Jurassic Sutton stone, a rare freestone that is a marginal or coastal deposit derived in part from erosion of carboniferous limestone. Sutton stone has always been highly regarded: as well as being used in construction throughout the Vale of Glamorgan, it was also shipped over the Bristol Channel to North Devon and North Cornwall, which are both deficient in limestone.

A major geological feature of the Upper Carboniferous rocks in south Wales is the south Wales coalfield. The rocks comprising this important area were laid down during the later Carboniferous. This sedimentary succession includes a sequence with a thickness of more than 1,800 m (5,906 ft) in the west. The coal measures were laid down on a low-lying waterlogged plain with peat mires immediately south of an ancient and persistent geological feature known as the Wales-London-Brabant High. Burial converted the peat deposits to thinner coal seams. Later earth movements distorted the coal-bearing strata, and the difficulty of mining led to premature closure of many mines on economic grounds, especially in Pembrokeshire where seams were squeezed completely out of shape.

== See also ==
- Geology of Wales
- Geography of Wales
