= Sarn Gynfelyn =

Shingle spit on Cardigan Bay, Wales

- Spit
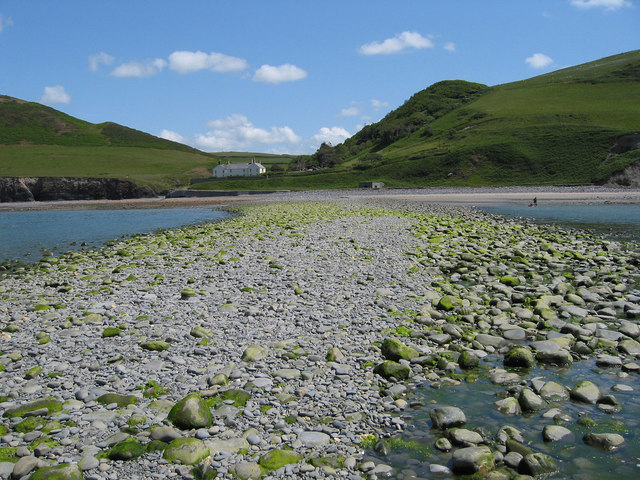

- Location in Ceredigion
- Coordinates: 52.4516°N 4.0819°W
- Location: Ceredigion, Wales, UK

Sarn Gynfelyn is a shingle spit on the coast of Cardigan Bay, in the county of Ceredigion, Mid-Wales, in the United Kingdom. It is located at Wallog, a few kilometres north of Llangorwen, close to Clarach Bay, south of Borth and north of the town of Aberystwyth. It extends, albeit with a single break, for a distance of 11 km from the coast to a reef known as Caerwyddno.

Similar landform examples are found at several points along the Cardigan Bay coast, known as sarnau. 'Sarn' (pluralised in Welsh as 'sarnau') is typically translated as 'causeway' or 'paved way'. These long banks which extend from the intertidal zone to the subtidal zone are thought to have originated as glacial moraines.

== In legend ==
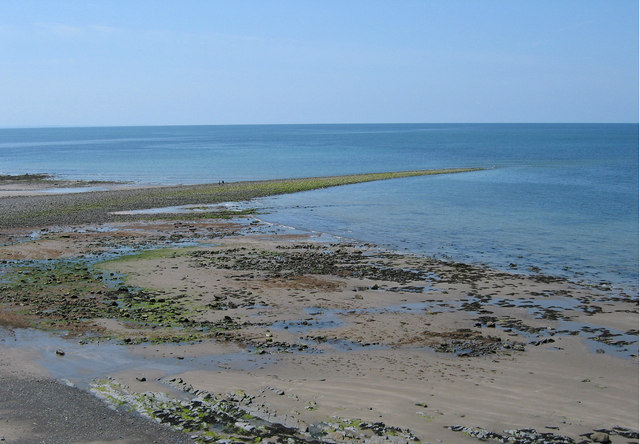
The sarn revealed at low tide

These protruding banks resemble man-made causeways and have long been part of the centuries-old legend of Cantre'r Gwaelod, a fabled sunken kingdom which was lost beneath the waters of Cardigan Bay. According to legend, Sarn Gynfelyn was one of the causeways leading to the lost land. The legend of Cantre'r Gwaelod is comparable to the deluge myth found in nearly every ancient culture, and it has been likened to the story of Atlantis.

External videos
- Sarn Gynfelyn and the submerged forest at Borth
- Submerged trees in the Dyfi Estuary; Clips from Coast (BBC, 2006)

In a 2006 episode of the BBC television documentary Coast, presenter Neil Oliver visited Sarn Gynfelyn to explore the legend of Cantre'r Gwaelod. The programme also featured the remains of the submerged forest at Ynyslas, some 5 miles (8.0 km) north of Sarn Gynfelyn, which is also associated with the legend. The vista of dead oak, pine, birch, willow and hazel tree stumps preserved by the acid anaerobic conditions in the soil is revealed at low tide and is estimated to be about 5000 years old.

== See also ==
- Sarn Badrig
- Sarn y Bwch
