= Mynydd Garnclochdy =

Highest point
- Elevation: 448 m (1,470 ft)
- Prominence: 44 m (144 ft)
- Parent peak: Coity Mountain
- Listing: Tump

Naming
- Language of name: Welsh

Geography
- Location: Monmouthshire, Wales
- OS grid: SO291060
- Topo map: OS Explorer OL13S

Mynydd Garnclochdy is a gentle summit on the long moorland ridge which extends south from the Blorenge towards Pontypool and which defines the boundary between the modern county of Monmouthshire to the east and the county borough of Torfaen to the west though historically it was entirely within the traditional county of Monmouthshire. Its summit, at a height of 448 m (1407 ft), is marked by a small cairn. The summit and the eastern slopes of the hill fall within the Brecon Beacons National Park. A southern top of the hill, Mynydd Garn-wen achieves a height of 436m, and carries a trig point further south again at an elevation of 425m. To the north the broad moorland ridge runs via a poorly defined 425m top and a col at 404m elevation just south of a minor east–west road, into Mynydd y Garn-fawr, east of Blaenavon.

== Geology ==
The hill is formed from a succession of sedimentary rocks laid down during the Carboniferous period. The relatively flat summit area is formed from mudstones topped with a sandstone both within the Lower Coal Measures Formation of the South Wales Coal Measures Group. Beneath this and outcropping concentrically are more mudstones and sandstones forming the Bishopston Mudstone Formation (traditionally known as the ‘Middle Shale’). Because the beds dip westwards, the actual summit is formed by the outer concentric band of sandstone rather than the stratigraphically higher Coal Measures sandstone. This in turn is underlain by the Twrch Sandstone, a rough gritty rock traditionally known as the ‘Basal Grit’ (of the Millstone Grit Series).

Beneath these are a series of limestones of different character, some of which are dolomitised and some of which have been quarried for lime production and in connection with the former ironworking industry. The Carboniferous Limestone sits atop a thick pile of brown/red coloured mudstones and sandstones which make up the Old Red Sandstone laid down during the Devonian period. The whole sequence dips slightly to the west into the coalfield and is crossed by a number of small geological faults. A handful of small landslips of unknown age affect the lower slopes of the hill in places.

== Archaeology ==
A Bronze Age cairn sits on the hill's 425m northern top. Small disused quarries once worked for limestone are scattered about the hill's eastern edge.

== Access ==
The upper parts of the hill and much of its western slopes are mapped as access land. Various restricted byways run to its west and north whilst access from the east is gained via public footpaths. The Cambrian Way long distance footpath runs south to north over this hill.
