= Foel Fraith =

Hill (602m) in Carmarthenshire, Wales

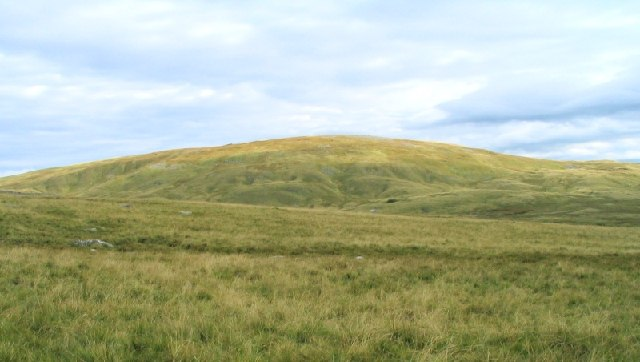
- Foel Fraith viewed from the north

Highest point
- Elevation: 602 m (1,975 ft)
- Prominence: 77 m (253 ft)
- Parent peak: Garreg Lwyd
- Listing: Hewitt, Nuttall
- Coordinates: 51.8491°N 3.8047°W

Naming
- Language of name: Welsh

Geography
- Location: Carmarthenshire, Wales
- Parent range: Brecon Beacons
- OS grid: SN757182

Foel Fraith is a hill in the Black Mountain in the county of Carmarthenshire, southwest Wales. It lies within the Brecon Beacons National Park and Fforest Fawr Geopark. Its plateau-like summit attains a height of 602 metres (1,975 ft) above sea level. To the north the subsidiary summit of Cefn y Cylchau reaches 556 feet (169 m), and to the southeast is the subsidiary summit of Carn Fadog or Cefn Carn Fadog, which reaches a height of 512 metres (1,680 ft).

== Geology ==
The hill has a split personality with its northern slopes dominated by the succession of Carboniferous Limestone rocks and its southern slopes by the Twrch Sandstone (formerly known as the 'Basal Grit') of the overlying Marros Group, but also dating from the Carboniferous period. In common with the regional trend the rock strata dip moderately to the south though locally the beds overlying the limestone have foundered as this soluble rock has dissolved away over millennia. There is an extensive area of shakeholes across the entire hill. Carn Fadog is similar in character. Its summit plateau conceals three small bodies of water. On its flanks are numerous quarries both for limestone and for gritstone.

== Access ==
The hill is designated as open country so freely accessible to walkers. A long bridleway runs north to south from Cwm Sawdde Fechan to Cwm Twrch on the eastern side of Foel Fraith and Carn Fadog. The Beacons Way from Abergavenny to Llangadog crosses Foel Fraith from east to west.
