= Cefn-cerig road =

UK road-demarcated geological boundary

Coordinates: 51°58′32.36″N 3°47′3.85″W

The Cefn-cerig road, a road near Cefn-cerig Farm, Llandovery, Wales, is the location of the Global Boundary Stratotype Section and Point (GSSP) which marks the boundary between the Aeronian and Telychian stages of the Silurian period on the geologic time scale. The GSSP was ratified in 1984.

The boundary is defined as a point immediately above the highest record of the brachiopod Eocoelia intermedia and below the first appearance of the succeeding species Eocoelia curtisi. The boundary also corresponds to the incoming of the acritarchs Deunffia monospinosa, Domasia bispinosa and Pterospermella. The section, part of the Wormwood Formation, is sandstone and siltstone.
