= Mynydd Bach Trecastell =

Hill in south-west Wales

Coordinates: 51.967°N 3.707°W

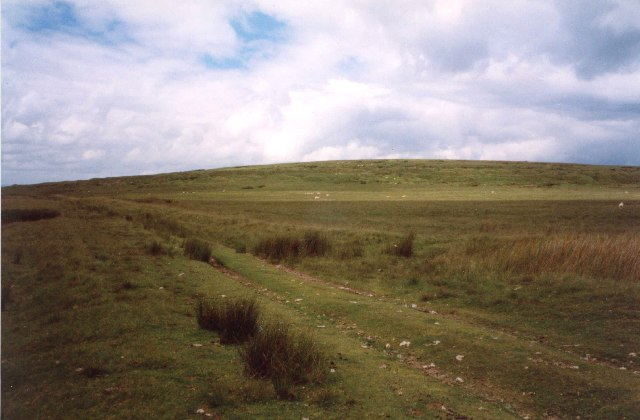
On the slopes of Mynydd Bach Trecastell

Mynydd Bach Trecastell is a hill on the border between the counties of Carmarthenshire and Powys in southwest Wales. It lies within the Black Mountain range of the Brecon Beacons National Park and Fforest Fawr Geopark. Its summit is plateau-like and reaches a height of 412m at OS grid ref SN 827312 at Y Pigwn. The name signifies the 'little hill of castle town'.

== Geology ==
The summit of the hill is formed in sandstones and siltstones of the Cae'r Mynach Formation which like all of the rocks are tilted steeply to the southeast as part of a geological structure called the Myddfai Steep Belt. The flaggy micaceous sandstones of the Tilestones Formation immediately overlie these beds and this is followed in turn by the thick sequence of the Raglan Mudstone Formation. These latter two formations are assigned as the oldest parts of the Old Red Sandstone though date from the Silurian. To the northwest are the various sandstones, mudstones and siltstones of the Aberedw, Hafod Fawr, Cwm Graig Ddu and Halfway Farm Formations. A series of northwest to southeast aligned faults cut through this succession and give rise to minor features in the landscape.

== Archaeology ==
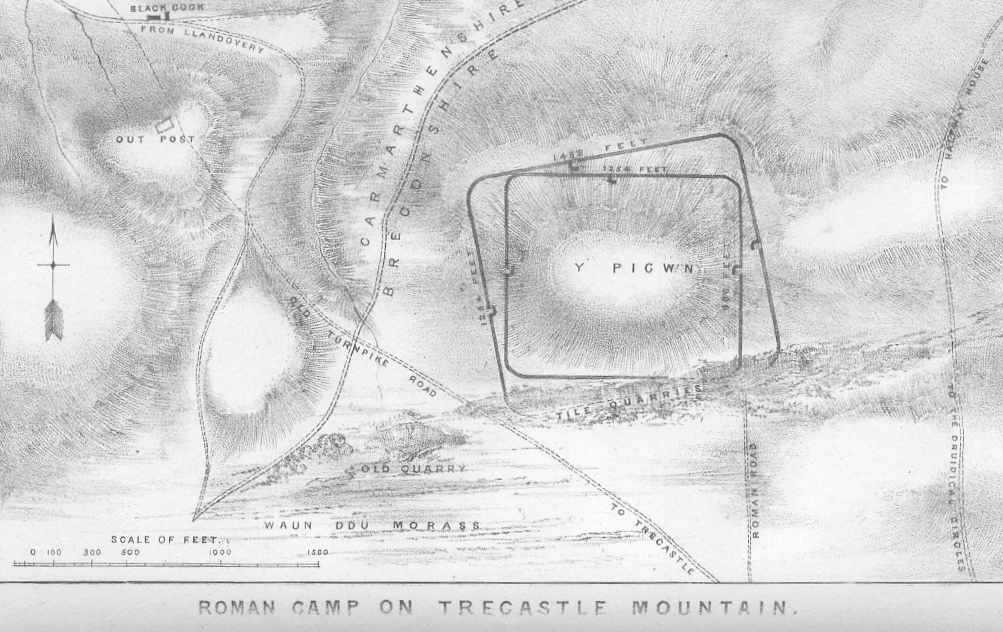
Y Pigwm, Trecastle, Breconshire. Plan of the Roman Marching Camps at Y Pigwm [The Beacon], drawn by William Rees in 1854

There are several round barrows and a stone circle on Mynydd Bach Trecastell dating to Bronze Age Britain. The Roman roads from CICVCIVM (Y Gaer) to MORIDVNVM (Moridunum, Carmarthen) via Llandovery ran over the hill and evidence of a couple of castras and a Roman fortlet remains on the hill.

== Access ==
Mynydd Bach Trecastell is largely designated as open country and so freely accessible to walkers. The old Roman road provides access onto the hill from the Trecastle direction.
