= Usk Inlier =

Rock domed outcrop in south-east Wales

Coordinates: 51.69°N 2.92°W

The Usk Inlier is a domed outcrop of rock strata of Silurian age in Monmouthshire in south-eastern Wales. It is located in the countryside between the towns of Caerleon and Pontypool and the village of Raglan. The longer axis of the dome or 'pericline', often referred to as the Usk Anticline, is aligned north–south. The inlier is largely surrounded by a sequence of Old Red Sandstone rocks of Devonian age, though both these and the Silurian rocks are largely obscured by superficial deposits.
