= Sarn Badrig =

Shingle reef in Cardigan Bay, Wales

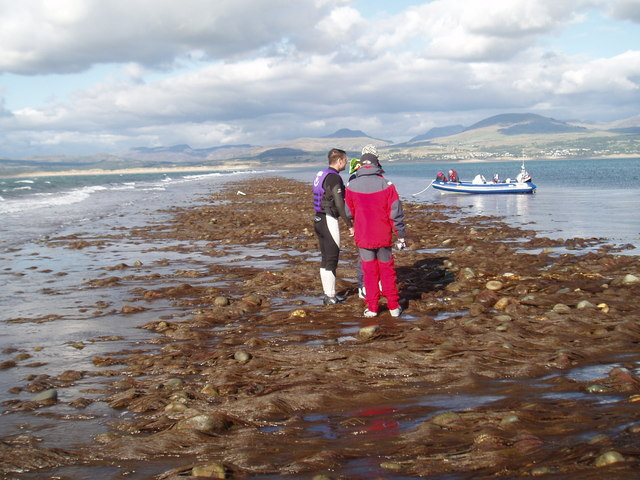
Sarn Badrig 4 km from land

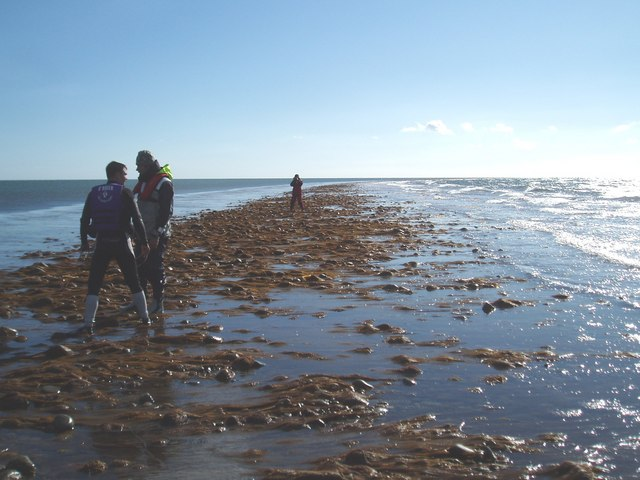
Visible at very low spring tide

Sarn Badrig, also spelled Sarn Padrig (Welsh for 'St. Patrick's causeway'), is one of several more or less parallel shingle reefs extending under the sea in Cardigan Bay on the west coast of Wales. The causeway is made of glacial deposits left by receding ice sheets at the end of the last ice age.

Sarn Badrig is the longest and most northerly of these, and extends south-westwards under the sea from Mochras Point, near Harlech, parallel to the Llŷn Peninsula for a length of about 20 km, and can be seen at low tide. It is a hazard to shipping.

A neighbouring causeway is that of Sarn y Bwch, which is close to Tywyn.

Another example can be found at Sarn Gynfelyn, which is north of Aberystwyth.

In Welsh legend it is one of the dykes which protected the drowned realm of Cantre'r Gwaelod.

== Points of interest ==
Point	Coordinates (Links to map resources)	OS Grid Ref	Notes
Bell buoy marking western hazard	52.68631°N 4.4225°W	SH36271263	
-5m depth western point	52.69112°N 4.36283°W	SH40321303	approx (from marine chart)
0m depth western point	52.70307°N 4.33841°W	SH42021431	approx
Mid point of visible sarn	52.74054°N 4.24303°W	SH48591827	approx
Eastern point of visible sarn	52.78167°N 4.16098°W	SH54262268	approx
Landing at eastern end	52.80812°N 4.15148°W	SH54992560	approx
