= Sarn y Bwch =

Reef in Cardigan Bay, Wales

Coordinates: 52.608°N 4.137°W

Sarn y Bwch, (Welsh for 'buck's causeway'), is one of three parallel reefs extending beneath the sea into Cardigan Bay from the west coast of Wales. The causeway, probably a medial moraine, is made of glacial deposits left by receding ice sheets at the end of the last ice age. It is sometimes called Sarn y Bwlch ('the causeway of the pass'), but this form is later and less common than Sarn y Bwch.

Sarn y Bwch is the central one of the three, extending south-westwards from near Tywyn. To the north is the causeway of Sarn Badrig, whilst to the south is Sarn Gynfelyn, which extends from near Aberystwyth.
