= Mynydd Myddfai =

Hill (440m) in Carmarthenshire, Wales

Coordinates: 51.9535°N 3.7387°W

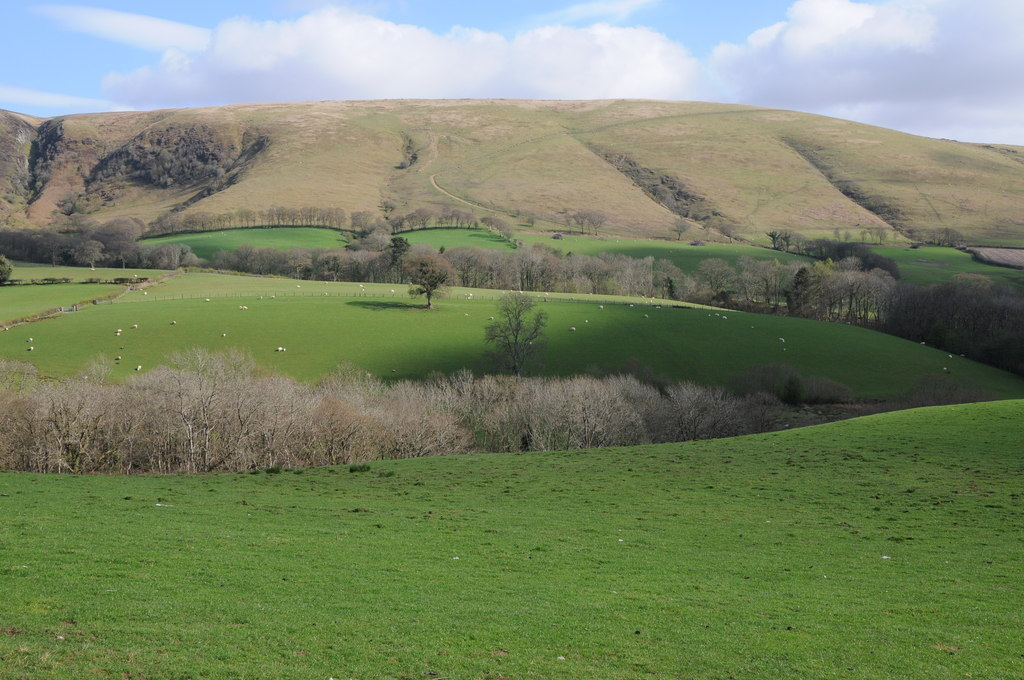
Mynydd Myddfai, viewed from the northwest

Mynydd Myddfai is a hill 4.5 miles southeast of Llandovery in the county of Carmarthenshire, southwest Wales. It lies within the Brecon Beacons National Park and Fforest Fawr Geopark. The hill is in the form of a broad ridge aligned southwest to northeast with three or four distinct tops separated by cols. The northwest side drops steeply away towards the village of Myddfai whilst the other side is a more shallow slope down towards Glasfynydd Forest which encircles Usk Reservoir. The plateau surface of the hill rises to a height of 440m at OS grid ref SN 806297 where a trig point has been erected.

== Geology ==
The hill is composed of a variety of different rock formations all tilted steeply to the southeast in a structure known as the Myddfai Steep Belt. The summit ridge is formed from sandstones and mudstones of the Cae'r Mynach Formation. Immediately southeast of these beds is the narrow band of the Tilestones Formation along which are a line of grassed over diggings left after these flaggy micaceous sandstones were extracted for use as roof tiles. Southeast again is the thick sequence of the Raglan Mudstone Formation. These last two formations are considered to be the lowermost of the Old Red Sandstone sequence though assigned like the rest of the rocks forming Mynydd Myddfai to the Silurian period. Northwest of the summit ridge are the sandstones and siltstones of the Hafod Fawr Formation and beneath them more sandstones, mudstones and siltstones of the Cwm Craig Ddu and Halfway Farm Formations. Northwest to southeast oriented faults cross the ridge in places and can be seen where they offset the line of the Tilestones workings.

== Archaeology ==
There are several ancient cairns on the hill together with the line of old quarries mentioned above. The age of these workings is unknown though they may well have been active over an extended period. A variety of Roman remains are located on Mynydd Bach Trecastell just to the northeast of Mynydd Myddfai. A number of new archaeological finds in 2007/08 were made during the excavation of a deep trench across the northern end of Mynydd Myddfai for the laying of a controversial gas pipeline from Milford Haven to Tirley in Gloucestershire.

== Access ==
The hill is designated as open country and so freely accessible to walkers. A bridleway runs across it from the dam of the Usk Reservoir northwest to Cwm yr Olchfa and another runs southeast from this one to meet a minor public road at the west end of the hill.
