= Gilwern Hill, Monmouthshire =

Hill in Monmouthshire, Wales

Gilwern Hill
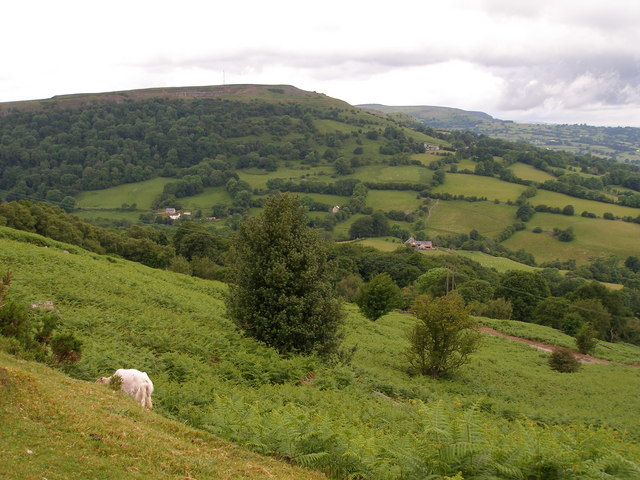
- Gilwern Hill viewed from the southeast

Highest point
- Elevation: 441 m (1,447 ft)
- Coordinates: 51°48′28″N 3°05′53″W

Geography
- Location: Monmouthshire, Wales
- Parent range: Brecon Beacons
- OS grid: SO244126

Gilwern Hill is a 441 m high hill in the Brecon Beacons National Park, south of the village of Gilwern in Monmouthshire, Wales. It lies west of the Blorenge. The hill is a Site of Special Scientific Interest.

== Geology ==
Gilwern Hill is formed from a series of rock strata of Carboniferous age, each of which dip moderately southwards. The summit plateau is formed from sandstones - the Farewell Rock and the Twrch Sandstone which overlie the Carboniferous Limestone. The latter has been extensively quarried around the eastern, northern and western margins of the hill where it is exposed. Derelict tramways are in evidence in connection with the working of these quarries for limestone in connection with iron and steel-smelting.

== Access and recreation ==
Virtually the entire hill is designated as open country and so access is therefore available freely to walkers. A minor road wraps around its southern and western margins whilst a couple of public footpaths and a restricted byway cross the northern and eastern slopes of the hill. The quarries provide a minor venue for rock climbing.
