= Clarach Bay =

Bay in Ceredigion, Wales

Coordinates: 52.436°N 4.079°W

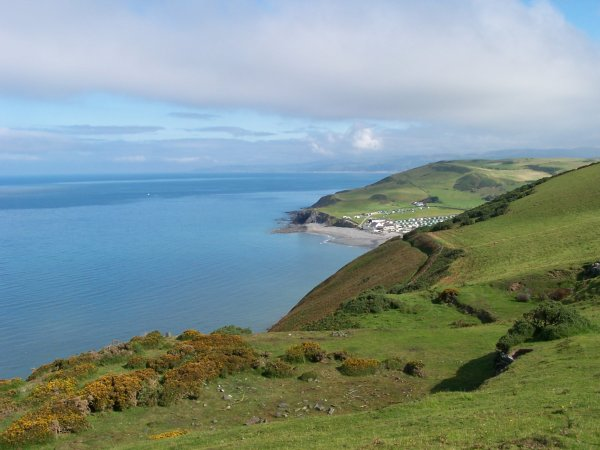
- View of Clarach Bay from Constitution Hill, Aberystwyth

- Location within Ceredigion
- OS grid reference: SN587840
- Principal area: Ceredigion
- Country: Wales
- Sovereign state: United Kingdom
- Post town: ABERYSTWYTH
- Postcode district: SY23
- Police: Dyfed-Powys
- Fire: Mid and West Wales
- Ambulance: Welsh
- UK Parliament: Ceredigion Preseli
- Senedd Cymru – Welsh Parliament: Ceredigion

Clarach Bay (Welsh pronunciation: [ˈklaraχ]) is a small bay on the coast of Ceredigion, Wales, to the north of Aberystwyth, where the Afon Clarach flows into the sea. It is home to multiple caravan parks, the biggest being Clarach Bay Holiday Village and Aber Bay Holiday Park. The coastal paths runs from Aberystwyth to Borth via Clarach.

== Holiday Parks ==
Clarach is popular in the summer months as a holiday destination due to its holiday parks.

- Clarach Bay Holiday Village is the largest holiday park in Clarach. It offers caravans, lodges and chalets for owners and visitors as well as many facilities such as: an indoor pool, club, restaurants, mini funfair, gym, arcade and shop. The holiday village is all located on the southern side of the Afon Clarach.
- Aber Bay Holiday Park (previously known as Glan-Y-Mor) is the largest holiday park on the northern side of the Afon Clarach. The park offers caravan and lodge stays for owners and visitors. The park was taken over by Allens Caravans in 2017 who renamed it to Aber Bay in 2022. The park received a £7.5 million investment in 2022 which consisted of building a new clubhouse and 65 new static caravan pitches. The new clubhouse opened in 2023.
- Ocean View Holiday Park is the only holiday park in Clarach to still feature touring pitches (Glan-Y-Mor previously used to). The park also features static caravans and simple facilities such as a laundrette, playing field and picnic area.
- Green Meadow Holiday Home Park is an owners only holiday park which features static caravans and lodges. The park is owned by Salop Leisure who also own nine other parks in Wales and Shrewsbury. The park has simple facilities such as a laundrette, gym and playing field.
Gallery
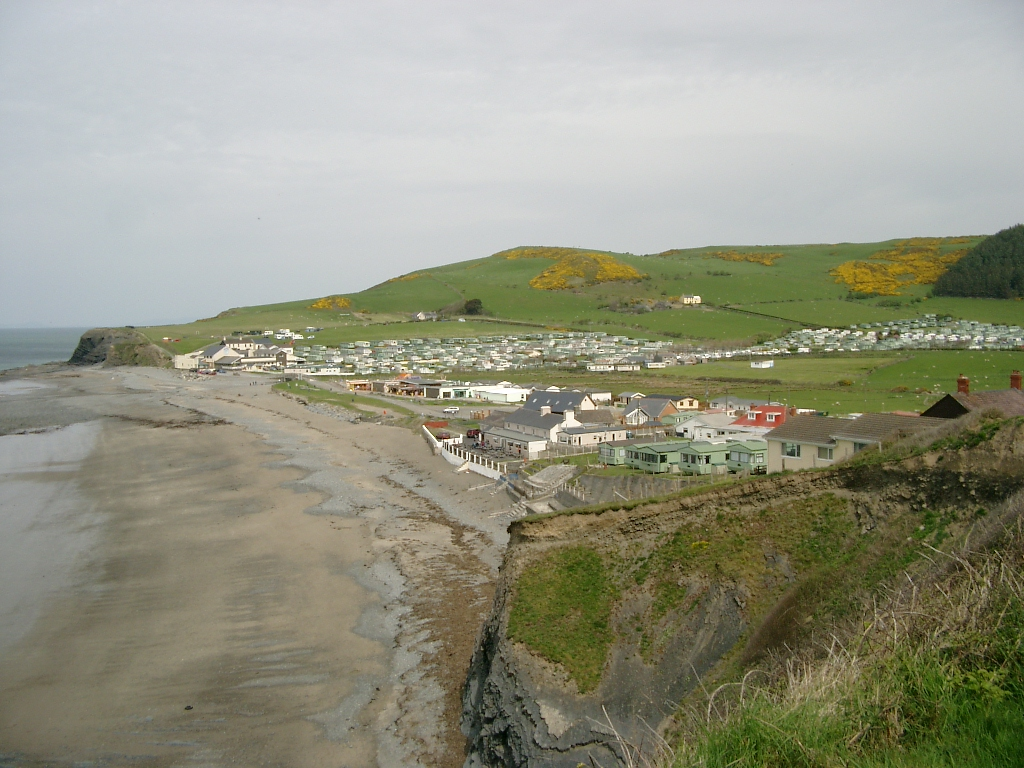
Clarach Bay, from the coastal path into Aberystwyth

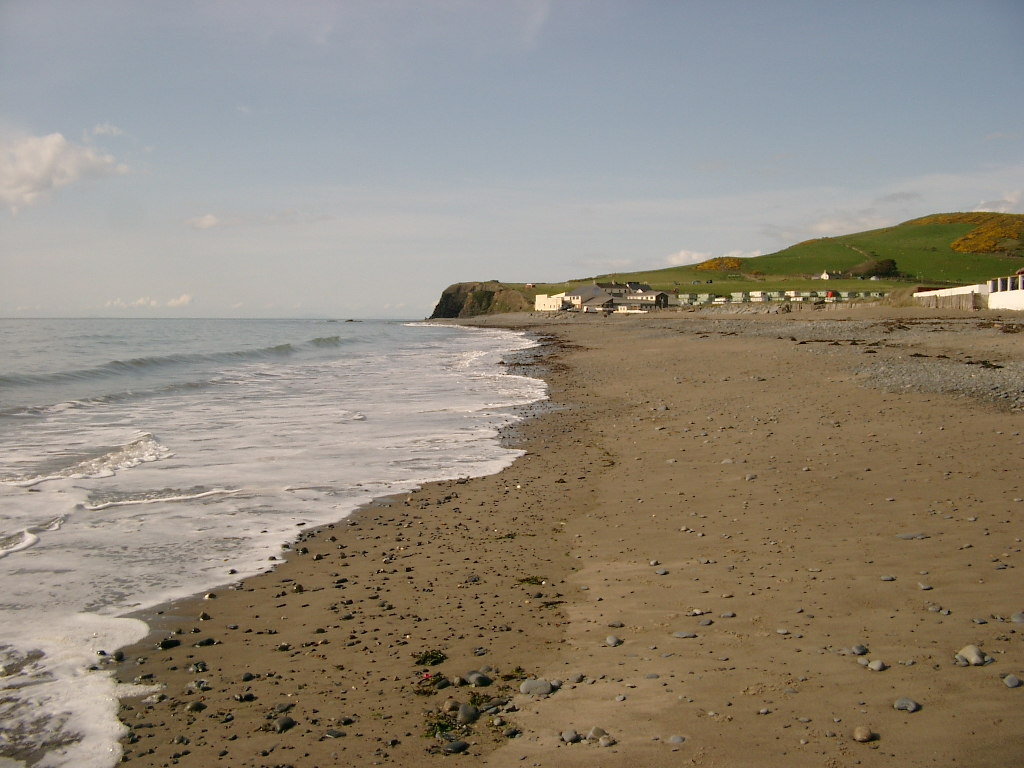
The beach at Clarach Bay
