= Inliers and outliers (geology) =

Area of older rock surrounded by younger rock

== Inlier ==
An inlier is an area of older rocks surrounded by younger rocks. Inliers are typically formed by the erosion of overlying younger rocks to reveal a limited exposure of the older underlying rocks. Faulting or folding may also contribute to the observed outcrop pattern. A classic example from Great Britain is that of the inlier of folded Ordovician and Silurian rocks at Horton in Ribblesdale in North Yorkshire which are surrounded by the younger flat-lying Carboniferous Limestone. The location has long been visited by geology students and experts. Another example from South Wales is the Usk Inlier in Monmouthshire where Silurian age rocks are upfolded amidst Old Red Sandstone rocks of Devonian age

One example from Great Britain is the mass of Triassic sandstone around the Staffordshire town of Leek. This is isolated from the very much larger area of Triassic rocks which characterise the English Midlands and Cheshire Basin, to the south and west respectively, by the surrounding Carboniferous sandstones and mudstones. Similarly in the Black Mountains of South Wales, the summit area of Pen Cerrig-calch is composed from a suite of Carboniferous age sandstones and limestone. This outcrop is isolated from the main extent of these rocks (which form the South Wales Coalfield and its margins some miles to the south) by the Devonian Old Red Sandstone on which it rests by and by which it is surrounded.

Grenvillian inliers located within the Appalachian orogeny include the Pine Mountain Belt in Georgia, the French Broad Massif along the Tennessee and North Carolina border, Sauratown Mountain Massif in North Carolina, the Shenandoah Massif in Virginia, the Baltimore Gneiss Domes in Maryland, the Honey Brook Upland in Pennsylvania, and the Reading Prong, which extends from Pennsylvania into New York. Other inliers include the Berkshire Massif, which extends from Massachusetts into Vermont, and the Green Mountain Massif in Vermont. Associated Canadian inliers include the Blair River Inlier on Cape Breton Island, Nova Scotia, the Steel Mountain Terrane on Newfoundland, and the Long Range Inlier on Newfoundland.

In West Africa, the Kenieba inlier borders southwestern Mali and eastern Senegal, and associated Birimian gold is found in Kalana and Sabodala respectively.

== Outlier ==
Conversely an outlier is an area of younger rock surrounded by older rocks. An outlier is typically formed when sufficient erosion of surrounding rocks has taken place to sever the younger rock's original continuity with a larger mass of the same younger rocks nearby.

== Klippe ==
A similar isolated arrangement of rocks produced for example by movement on a thrust fault followed by erosion may be termed a klippe.

== Window ==
A similar outcrop pattern which results from movement on a thrust fault followed by erosion may be termed a window.
