= Pantyffynnon railway station =

Railway station in west Wales

Pantyffynnon
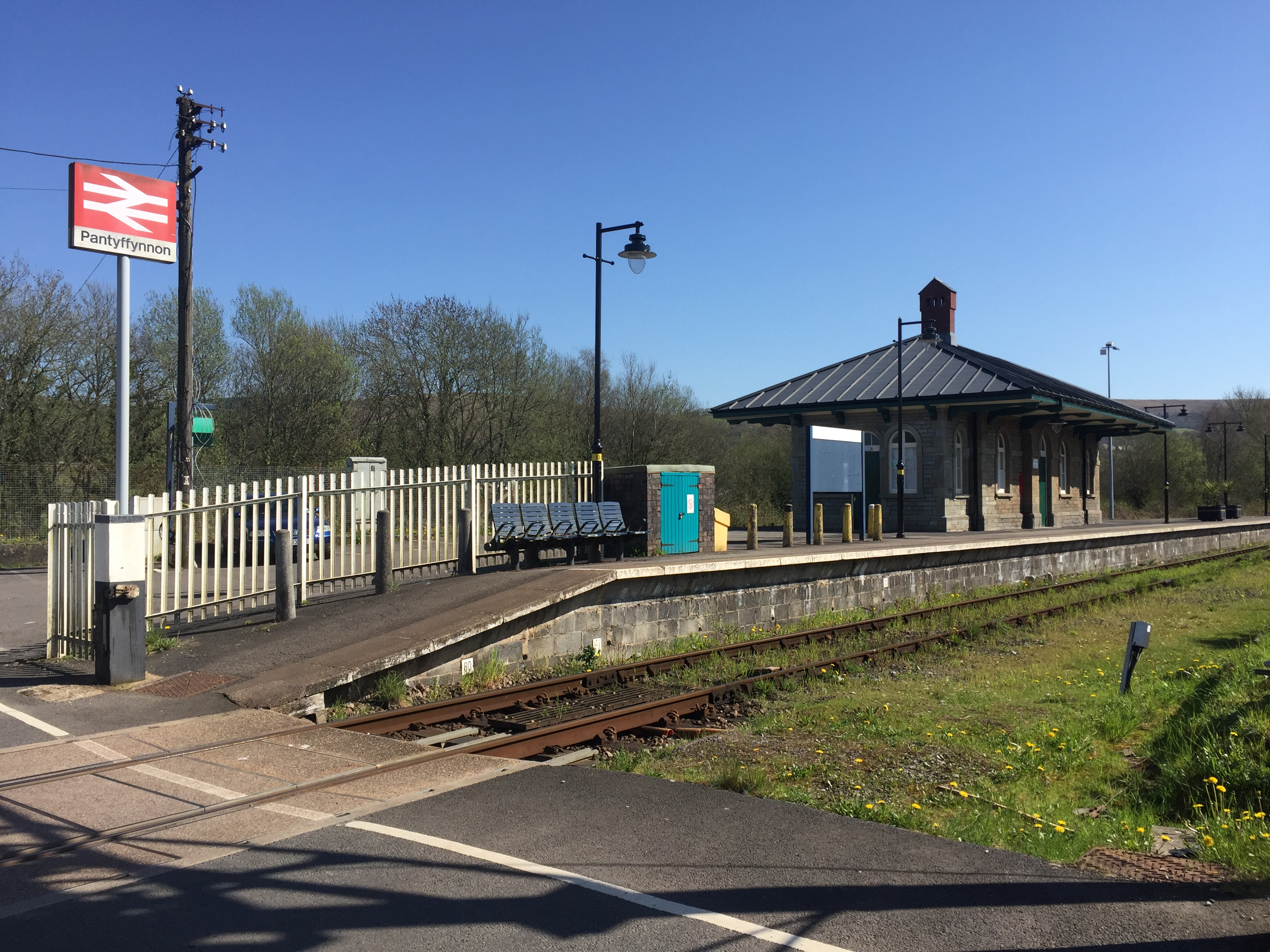

General information
- Location: Pantyffynnon, Carmarthenshire; Wales
- Coordinates: 51.779°N 3.997°W
- Grid reference: SN622107
- Manager: Transport for Wales
- Platforms: 2

Other information
- Station code: PTF
- Classification: DfT category F2

Key dates
- 1841: Opened

Passengers
- 2021/22: ▲1,428
- 2022/23: ▲2,404
- 2023/24: ▲3,488
- 2024/25: ▲4,910
- 2025/26: ▲7,144

Listed Building – Grade II
- Feature: Pantyffynnon Railway Station
- Designated: 12 March 1996
- Reference no.: 14812
Location
Notes
- Passenger statistics from the Office of Rail and Road

Pantyffynnon railway station is a railway station serving the village of Pantyffynnon, in Carmarthenshire, Wales. It is situated on the Heart of Wales Line at its junction with the branch lines to Brynamman and Abernant.

== History ==
The station was originally fairly large and built adjacent to the Dynevor tinplate works and included station buildings, signal box, freight yard and from 1931 a small railway locomotive shed. The signal box (formerly one of three at the station and dating from 1892) is the only surviving example on the HoW route and since 1986, it has supervised the entire line north of here to Craven Arms using a system of working known as No Signalman Token Remote (NSTR). It is also a 'fringe box' for the power box at Port Talbot, which controls the line south from here towards Llanelli and supervises access to the freight branch to Gwaun-cae-Gurwen (which is worked under 'One Train Working' regulations).

The Llanelly Railway first reached the village as long ago as 1839, continuing eastwards to Garnant following within a year and the main line being extended to Duffryn (the current Ammanford) in May 1841. The station on the current site was first built at this time, although it has undergone several significant alterations since then. Brynamman would be reached (under GWR auspices) in 1886, some 45 years after the opening of the mineral line from Garnant to Gwaun-cae-Gurwen, whilst the network of routes reached from Pantyffynnon would be completed in 1922 with the opening of the short branch to the colliery at Abernant. This was planned to be a through route to connect the coalfield with the Swansea District Line but was never completed. Neither it nor the GcG branch was ever used by passenger services, even though a number of stations were built on both lines.

The old Brynamman branch closed to passengers in August 1958 (complete closure following five years later) and the old branch platform has been disused since then (the GcG branch line remains in use for freight traffic - see below). The former northbound platform is also derelict - this was abandoned in March 1966 after the closure of the former North signal box (traffic henceforth using the former southbound line & platform in both directions).

The station's Grade II listed historic waiting room was restored by Network Rail with support from Carmarthenshire's Built Heritage Team and a significant grant funding from the Railway Heritage Trust. A plaque was unveiled at the station on 19 January 2018. Network Rail was awarded the Railway Heritage Trust Conservation Award for the ‘best restored structure’ at the National Rail Heritage Awards.

== Facilities ==
The station is unstaffed and has no ticket machine (as is the case for almost all stations on the line), so all tickets must be purchased on the train or in advance of travel. The main building is Grade II-listed and dates from 1857, but had been disused since the 1960s - it was restored and refurbished by Network Rail (with assistance from the Railway Heritage Trust and the local community) in 2013-14. It is provided with the standard amenities - help point, CIS screen, payphone and timetable poster board. Step-free access is available from the level crossing at the north end - this still has manually operated metal gates rather than the automatic barriers used elsewhere on the line.

== Services ==
All trains serving the station are operated by Transport for Wales, who also manage it. There are five trains a day to Shrewsbury northbound from Monday to Saturday (plus one more to Llandovery) and six southbound to Llanelli and Swansea (the first train in each direction does not run on Saturdays); two services each way call on Sundays. A fifth weekday through train in each direction was reintroduced at the winter 2025 timetable change, and the potential for additional Sunday services over the line from summer 2026 is also being investigated by Transport for Wales.

Preceding station	National Rail	Following station
Pontarddulais	Transport for Wales; Heart of Wales Line	Ammanford
	Historical railways	
Pontarddulais; Line and station open	Great Western Railway Llanelly Railway	Parcyrhun Halt; Line open, station closed
	Disused railways	
Pontarddulais; Line and station open	Great Western Railway Amman Valley Railway	Ammanford; Line and station closed

== Amman Valley branch ==
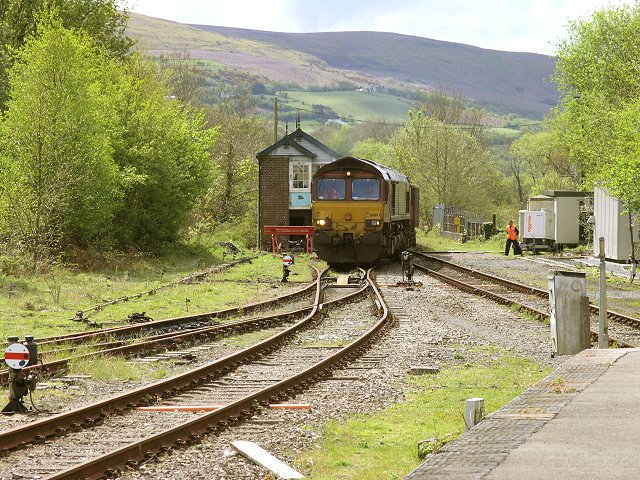
EWS Class 66 joins the Amman Valley railway branch at Pantyffynnon, as it heads towards the opencast mine near Gwaun-cae-Gurwen

The old Amman Valley branch line through Ammanford and Gwaun-cae-Gurwen which joined here to the other side of the current platform was closed in its entirety along with the yard after the closure of Abernant Colliery in 1988. The railway shed (closed 1964) and turntable are also gone, with nothing to reveal their former existence. The junction was reinstated for freight services only in 2006 as EWS requested that part of the line be reinstated to serve the opencast site at Tairgwaith Colliery.

The Amman Valley Railway Society has also been attempting to reinstate the Amman Valley line as a heritage railway, although EWS plans prevent this in the short term. EWS started running coal trains to Gwaun-Cae-Gurwen in 2009.

== Bibliography ==
- Body, G. (1983), PSL Field Guides - Railways of the Western Region, Patrick Stephens Ltd, Wellingborough, ISBN 0-85059-546-0
