= Garnant =

Village in Carmarthenshire, Wales

Coordinates: 51.802°N 3.902°W

Garnant: Welsh: Y Garnant
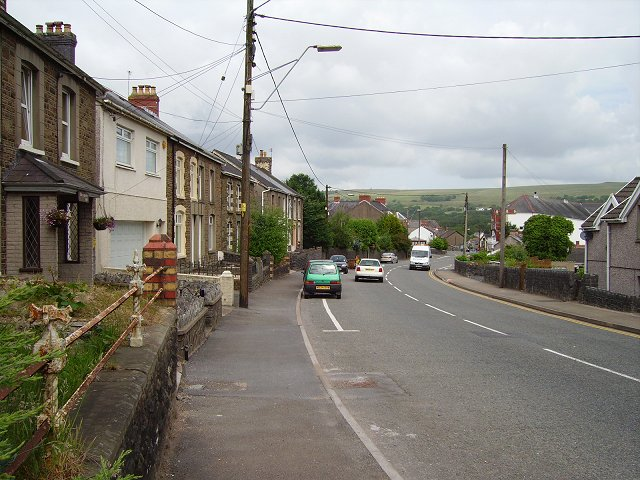

- Location within Carmarthenshire
- Population: 2,023 (2011)
- OS grid reference: SN687130
- Community: Cwmamman
- Principal area: Carmarthenshire
- Preserved county: Dyfed
- Country: Wales
- Sovereign state: United Kingdom
- Post town: AMMANFORD
- Postcode district: SA18
- Dialling code: 01269
- Police: Dyfed-Powys
- Fire: Mid and West Wales
- Ambulance: Welsh
- UK Parliament: Caerfyrddin
- Senedd Cymru – Welsh Parliament: Carmarthen East and Dinefwr

Garnant (Welsh: Y Garnant) is a mining village in the valley of the River Amman in Carmarthenshire, Wales, north of Swansea. Like the neighbouring village of Glanamman it experienced a coal-mining boom in the 19th and early 20th centuries, but the last big colliery closed in 1936 and coal has been extracted fitfully since then. The village has the only Commissioners' church built in southwest Wales, traditionally a Methodist region.

== History ==
The location of Garnant and Glanamman was known as Cwmamman ("Amman valley") before coal was discovered; until the 18th century it was a remote wilderness with just a few farms and rough mountain roads. Mining appears to have started at Brynlloi in Glanamman in 1757 and small coal workings proliferated in the first half of the 19th century. The lease to "Garnant Colliery" was offered in an advert of 1830, which was probably at the border of Garnant and Gwaun-cae-gurwen near the main road.

The arrival of the Llanelly Railway in 1840 meant that coal could be exported on an industrial scale through Llanelli docks. The railway's decision to build two stations at Garnant (originally called Amman Valley) and Glanamman encouraged the two halves of Cwmamman to develop their own identity, as did the construction of Christchurch in Garnant at about the same time. Taking its name from the emblem of the Dynevor family, the "Raven" colliery in Garnant was operating by 1854 and opened a new shaft in 1907. By World War I, it was employing 450 men. However, the mines were very dependent on the railway for transporting the coal, and when in the early 1920s there was a rail strike this caused mass unemployment (at a time when no work meant no pay), as is recorded by Arthur Bullock who was recruited to work at the Labour Exchange.

The Raven colliery eventually closed in 1936 after an industrial dispute. The site is now the Raven Industrial Park. Coal mining has continued sporadically since then, most notably at an open-cast mine which extracted 2,000 tons per week between 1988 and 1992. The site is now the Garnant Park golf club.

== Government ==
Cwmamman, the old name for the location of Glanamman and Garnant, was revived for the modern urban community covering the two villages, which now have much smaller populations than in their heyday at the turn of the 20th century. Garnant is the name of the Carmarthenshire County Council electoral ward, represented by one county councillor.

Rhodri Glyn Thomas of Plaid Cymru currently represents the village at the Welsh Assembly in the constituency of Carmarthen East and Dinefwr. He had a majority of 8,000 votes over Labour's Kevin Madge in the Welsh Assembly Elections 2007.

== Geography ==
The village is about 12 miles north of Swansea on the edge of the Black Mountain, in the westernmost part of the Brecon Beacons National Park. It lies at the junction of three rivers, where the Rivers Garnant and Pedol meet the River Amman. Garnant lies in the western part of the South Wales Coalfield, where the coal is particularly high-quality anthracite.

== Demography ==
The effect of the mining boom can be seen in the expansion of Cwmamman parish (including Glanamman and surrounding villages) from just over 3,000 in 1851 to over 11,000 in the early 20th century. The population of Garnant ward was 1,965 people at the 2001 census, increasing to 2,139 at the 2011 census. Glanamman is a similar size.

== Economy ==
Traditionally the economy was based on coal-mining with some dairy farming, but the mines have closed and farms have moved from milk production to beef-farming. Other industries sprang up in the valley during the 19th century, including the Amman Tinplate Works between 1883 and 1932 which was turned into Parc Golwg Yr Aman.

== Culture and community ==
Since 1988 Cwmamman has been twinned with the village of Pouldergat, in Brittany. The community is a stronghold of the Welsh language, with 58.5% of people speaking it in the 2011 census.

== Landmarks ==
The valley has been shaped by coal workings and their waste, but little remains above ground. Christchurch and the chapels (see below) are the main landmarks, along with the new school.

== Transport ==
A turnpike road (now the A474) was constructed along the valley in 1817. The Llanelly Railway and Dock Company built the Llanelly Railway to Garnant in 1840. It was taken over by the GWR on amalgamation in 1923, and closed to passenger services by British Railways on 18 August 1958. Freight traffic continued until the closure of the Abernant Colliery in 1988. The Amman Valley Railway Society are seeking to restore the Abernant branch line as part of the Swansea 9 Lines project.

== Education ==
Three local schools, Ysgol y Twyn, Ysgol Gynradd y Garnant and Ysgol Gynradd Glanaman, were merged to form Ysgol y Bedol (the Horseshoe School) at the confluence of the three rivers in Twyn. This primary school for ages 2–11 was opened in 2005. Ysgol y Bedol is a category A, or Welsh medium school. The nearest secondary school is Ysgol Dyffryn Aman in Ammanford.

== Religious sites ==
The Welsh valleys were a stronghold of Nonconformism. Old Bethel Chapel, also known as The Old Meeting House, was built in 1773 high on the north side of the valley between Glanamman and Garnant. Pevsner describes the pulpit on a wine-glass stem as an "exceptional rarity". In 1875 it was superseded by the New Bethel Chapel on the main road at the west end of village.

Christchurch, the only Commissioners' church in southwest Wales was built above the river junction in 1839–42. The interior was refitted in 1888 and it is surrounded by a large graveyard. Ammanford, a few miles down the valley, was a centre of the 1904–1905 Welsh Revival which saw thousands of new converts. The revival affected Garnant and it was said that young men abandoned gambling and burnt their playing cards.

== Sport ==
Garnant Park (formerly Cwmamman Recreation Ground) was part of Lord Dynevor's Glanrafon Farm estate. It is home to Amman United RFC which was founded in 1903 and is a feeder club for the Scarlets regional team. Players who have gone on to rugby at international level include Claude Davey, Tom Day and Trevor Evans of the British Lions.

It is across the river from the old Amman Tinplate Works. In 1996 Cwmamman Town Council bought the site of the works and turned it into Parc Golwg Yr Aman (Amman View Park), with a basketball area, rugby field, skateboard park and fishing platforms. The opencast coalmine on the south side of the valley has been turned into Garnant Park golf club.

== Notable people ==
See Category:People from Garnant

- Roger Thomas (1925–1994), a British politician and MP for Carmarthen from 1979 to 1987
- John Cale OBE (born 1942), musician, songwriter, record producer and founding member of rock band the Velvet Underground
- Hywel Bennett (1944–2017), Welsh film and TV actor
- Dafydd Hywel (born 1945), a Welsh TV and movies actor
- Gary Pickford-Hopkins (1948–2013), singer, composer and guitarist

=== Sport ===
- Guy Morgan (1907–1973), Wales international rugby player
- Claude Davey (1908–2001), Wales international rugby player
- Jim Lang (1909–1991), Wales international rugby player
- Ted Ward (1917–1988), a Welsh rugby union, and professional rugby league footballer where he scored over 1000 points
- Jack 'Tex' Evans (1928–1996), ice hockey player and coach in the NHL

== See also ==
- Glanamman - neighbouring village which shares much of Garnant's history
