= Cwmamman =

Community in Carmarthenshire, Wales

Coordinates: 51°48′18″N 3°54′54″W

- Community
- Location within Carmarthenshire
- Principal area: Carmarthenshire
- Country: Wales
- Sovereign state: United Kingdom
- Police: Dyfed-Powys
- Fire: Mid and West Wales
- Ambulance: Welsh
- List of places UK Wales Carmarthenshire Map of the community

Cwmamman or Cwmaman is a community in Carmarthenshire, about 12 miles north of Swansea in southwest Wales. Literally meaning "Amman valley", it takes its name from the River Amman which runs through the area. The main settlements in the community are Glanamman and Garnant.

== History ==
Cwmamman was the original name of the valley. As coal-mining boomed during the late 19th century two adjoining villages grew up in the valley, known as Glanamman to the west and Garnant to the east. Each village had a station on the Llanelly Railway, built in 1840: Garnant (originally called Cwmamman) and Glanamman (originally called Cross Keys).

Christchurch, the only Commissioners' church in southwest Wales was built in Garnant in 1839–42. In contrast, four Methodist chapels were constructed in Glanamman before St Margaret's church was built in 1933.

== Governance ==
There are two tiers of local government covering Cwmamman, at community and county level: Cwmaman Town Council (Cyngor Tref Cwmaman) and Carmarthenshire County Council (Cyngor Sir Gâr). The town council now generally uses the spelling Cwmaman rather than Cwmamman in both English and Welsh, although Cwmamman remains the official English language spelling of the community name. The town council is based at the Community Centre on High Street in Glanamman.

=== Administrative history ===
Until 1912 the area straddled the parishes of Betws to the south of the river and Llandeilo north of the river. In 1912 an urban district was established covering Glanamman and Garnant, under the name Cwmamman.

Cwmamman Urban District was abolished in 1974, with the area becoming instead a community. District-level functions passed to Dinefwr Borough Council, which was in turn replaced by Carmarthenshire County Council in 1996.

The two Carmarthenshire County Council electoral wards covering the community are called Garnant and Glanamman, each electing one county councillor.

== Demography ==
The Cwmamman area now has much smaller population than in its heyday at the turn of the 20th century. The actual population for the community at the 2011 census was 4,486.

Cwmamman is 78.47% Welsh speaking and lies at the foot of the Black Mountain. The community is bordered by the communities of: Betws; Llandybie; Dyffryn Cennen; and Quarter Bach, all being in Carmarthenshire; and by Gwaun-Cae-Gurwen and Pontardawe in Neath Port Talbot.
