= Gwaun-Cae-Gurwen (electoral ward) =

Electoral ward of Neath Port Talbot, Wales

Coordinates: 51.78443°N 3.87879°W

- Population: 2,827 (2001 census)
- Principal area: Neath Port Talbot
- Preserved county: West Glamorgan
- Country: Wales
- Sovereign state: United Kingdom
- UK Parliament: Neath
- Senedd Cymru – Welsh Parliament: Neath
- Councillors: Sonia Reynolds (Labour)

Gwaun-Cae-Gurwen is an electoral ward of Neath Port Talbot county borough, Wales. The ward of Gwaun-Cae-Gurwen along with the Lower Brynamman electoral ward makes up the parish of Gwaun-Cae-Gurwen.

Gwaun-Cae-Gurwen consists of some or all of the following settlements: Cwmgors, Gwaun-Cae-Gurwen and Gwaun-Leision in the parliamentary constituency of Neath. Gwaun-Cae-Gurwen consists of a built up area to the west and north, surrounded by farmland. The south eastern part of the ward consists of open moorland.

Gwaun-Cae-Gurwen is bounded by the wards of Quarter Bach of Carmarthenshire to the north; Lower Brynamman and Cwmllynfell to the east; Pontardawe to the south; and Glanamman of Carmarthenshire to the west.

In the 2017 local council elections, the electorate turnout was 41%. The results were:

Candidate	Party	Votes	Status
Sonia Reynolds	Labour	523	Labour hold
Meirion Jordan	Plaid Cymru	357	
