= Tudor Williams =

- Born: 23 December 1898 Cwarter Bach, Wales
- Died: 24 July 1922 (aged 23) Gwaun-cae-Gurwen, Wales
- Occupation: Electrician

Rugby union career
- Position: Scrum-half
International career
Years	Team	Apps	(Points)
1921	Wales	1	(0)

Tudor Williams (23 December 1898 – 24 July 1922) was a Welsh international rugby union player.

Williams came from Cwarter Bach and was a product of Cwmllynfell RFC.

A scrum–half, Williams gained his only Wales cap during the 1921 Five Nations, as a halfback partner to his Swansea teammate Billy Bowen in a win over France at Cardiff Arms Park.

Williams worked as an assistant electrician at Blaencaegurwen Colliery. While working underground in 1922, Williams was electrocuted after coming into contact with a live wire. He was 23 years of age.

== See also ==
- List of Wales national rugby union players
