= Amman Valley =

Amman Valley may refer to:

- The valley that hosts Downtown Amman
- The valley of the River Amman
- Amman Valley Hospital
- Amman Valley Railway
- Amman Valley Railway Society
- Amman Valley School
