= River Loughor =

River in south Wales

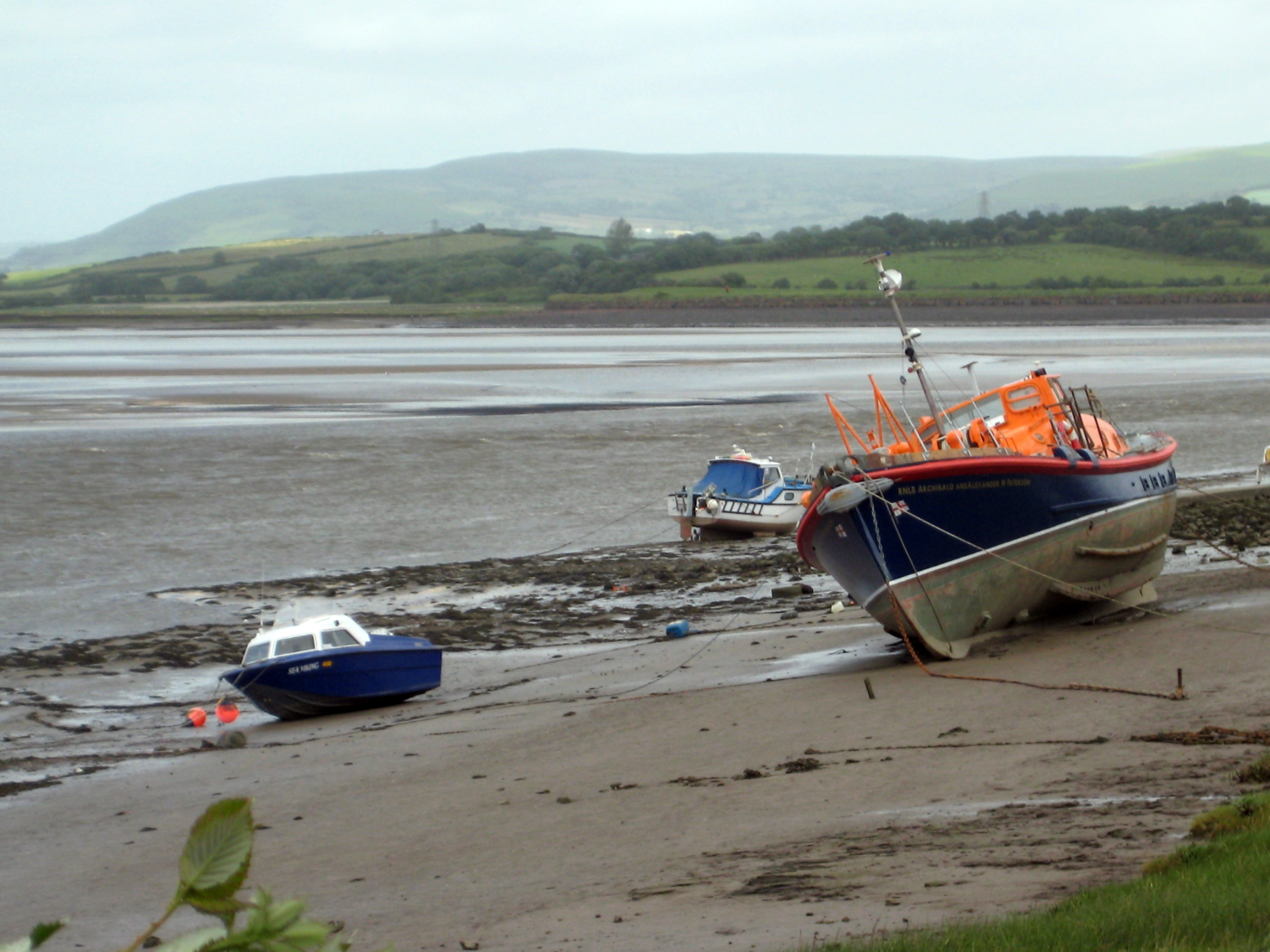
- River Loughor just above the Loughor bridges

- Location within Wales
- Native name: Afon Llwchwr

Location
- Country: Wales
- Counties: Carmarthenshire; Swansea

Physical characteristics
- Source: Black Mountain
  - location: Llygad Llwchwr
- Mouth: Carmarthen Bay
  - location: Loughor
  - coordinates: 51°40′N 4°05′W

The River Loughor (/ˈlʌxər/; Welsh: Afon Llwchwr) is a river in Wales which marks the border between Carmarthenshire and Swansea. The river is sourced from a cave network beneath the Black Mountain emerging at the surface from Llygad Llwchwr which translates from the Welsh as "eye of the Loughor". It flows past Ammanford and Hendy in Carmarthenshire and Pontarddulais in Swansea. The river divides Carmarthenshire from Swansea for much of its course and it separates Hendy from Pontarddulais at the point where the river becomes tidal. The Loughor meets the sea at its estuary near the town of Loughor where it separates the south coast of Carmarthenshire from the north coast of the Gower Peninsula. Among its tributaries are the River Amman and the River Morlais, with the former joining the Loughor near Pantyffynnon. The area of the catchment is some 262 square kilometres (101 sq mi).

In the 18th century, the river was a noted salmon and sea trout river. Fish from the river was then carried on ponies to be sold at Swansea Market. The fishing declined in the 19th century due to increasing pollution from industrialisation.

Carmarthenshire County Council is currently undertaking studies into the possibility of constructing a barrage across the River Loughor upstream from the Loughor bridges.

== Estuary ==
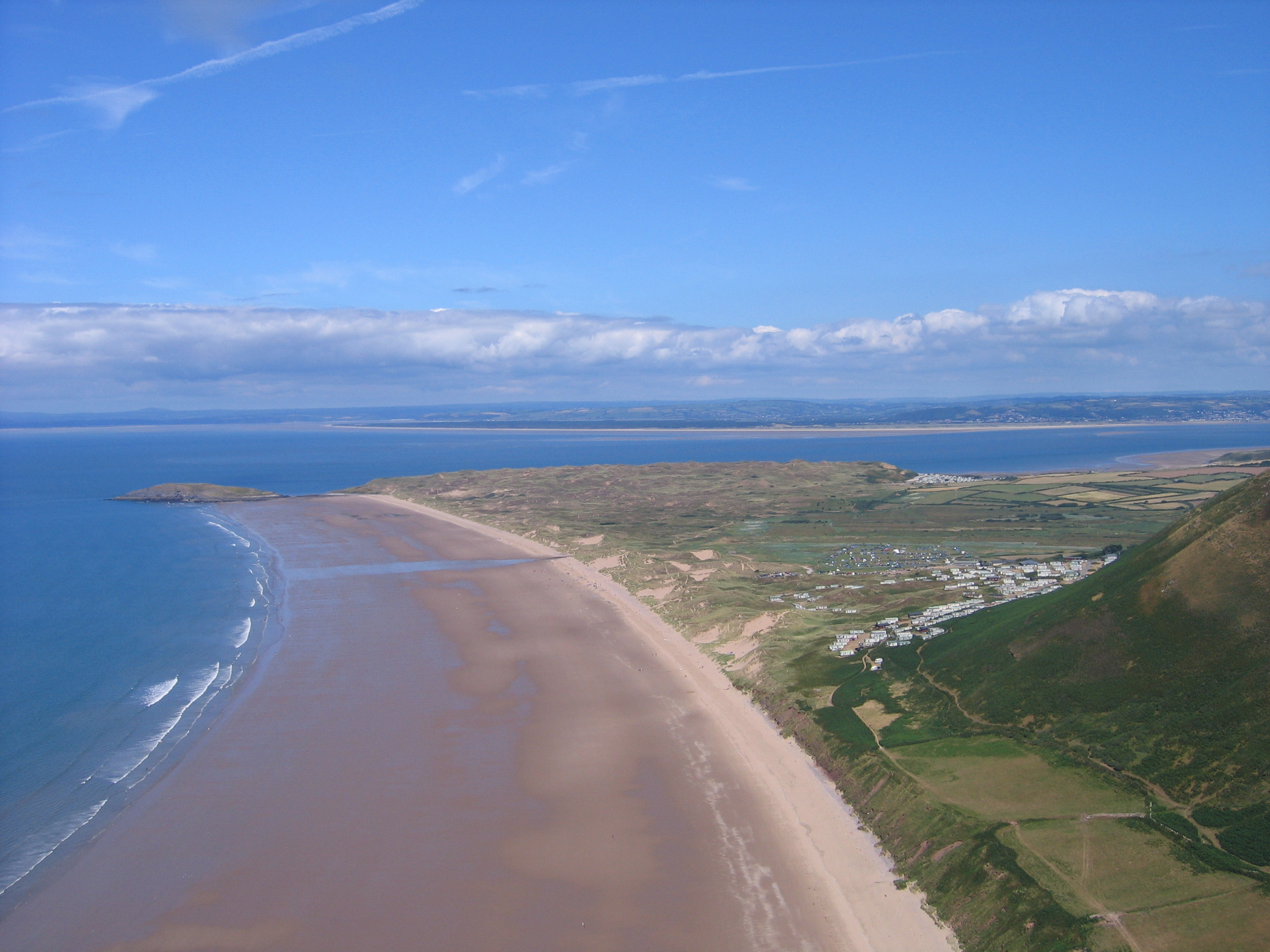
Looking out to the Loughor estuary from Rhossili

Designations

Ramsar Wetland
- Official name: Burry Inlet
- Designated: 14 July 1992
- Reference no.: 562

Burry Inlet and Loughor Estuary
- Site of Special Scientific Interest
- Location of Burry Inlet and Loughor Estuary.
- Area of search: West Glamorgan
- Area: 5,897.7 hectares (14,574 acres)
- Notification date: 1989

The Loughor Estuary (Welsh: Aber Llwchwr; also known as the Burry inlet or Burry estuary, from the small Burry River which enters on the Gower side near its mouth) is the region of the waterway below the road and rail bridges at Loughor, where it turns abruptly from a southerly to a westerly direction towards Carmarthen Bay. The Afon Lliw empties into the estuary just below the Loughor bridges. This region almost completely empties at low tide, exposing extensive sandy areas supporting a thriving cockle industry.

On the south side of the inlet, the gathering and processing of cockles (Cerastoderma edule) contributes significantly to the economy of the villages of Crofty, Llanmorlais and Penclawdd. Anyone can take a bucket of cockles for their personal use, but the commercial fishery is restricted to a relatively small number of licence holders. Cockle density fluctuates from year to year. The estuary is also an internationally important location for waders and other wildfowl, which has led to demands from cocklers for the control of oystercatchers (Haematopus ostralegus), which feed on cockles.

The estuary cuts through the southern part of a once-important coalfield. Llanelli, on its north shore, was noted for its tinplate industry, whilst Penclawdd, on the south side, smelted copper from ore shipped in from Anglesey. Both required ready access to the Bristol Channel via Carmarthen Bay. The main channel has fluctuated from side to side of the estuary in the past; in the late 19th century, the Llanelli Port Authority obtained legislation permitting the construction of a training wall intended to confine it to the north side of the estuary; unfortunately, this merely dissipated the currents, accelerating the silting-up not only of the entrance to Llanelli North Dock but also of the Penclawdd anchorage. The wall has since been breached in several places.

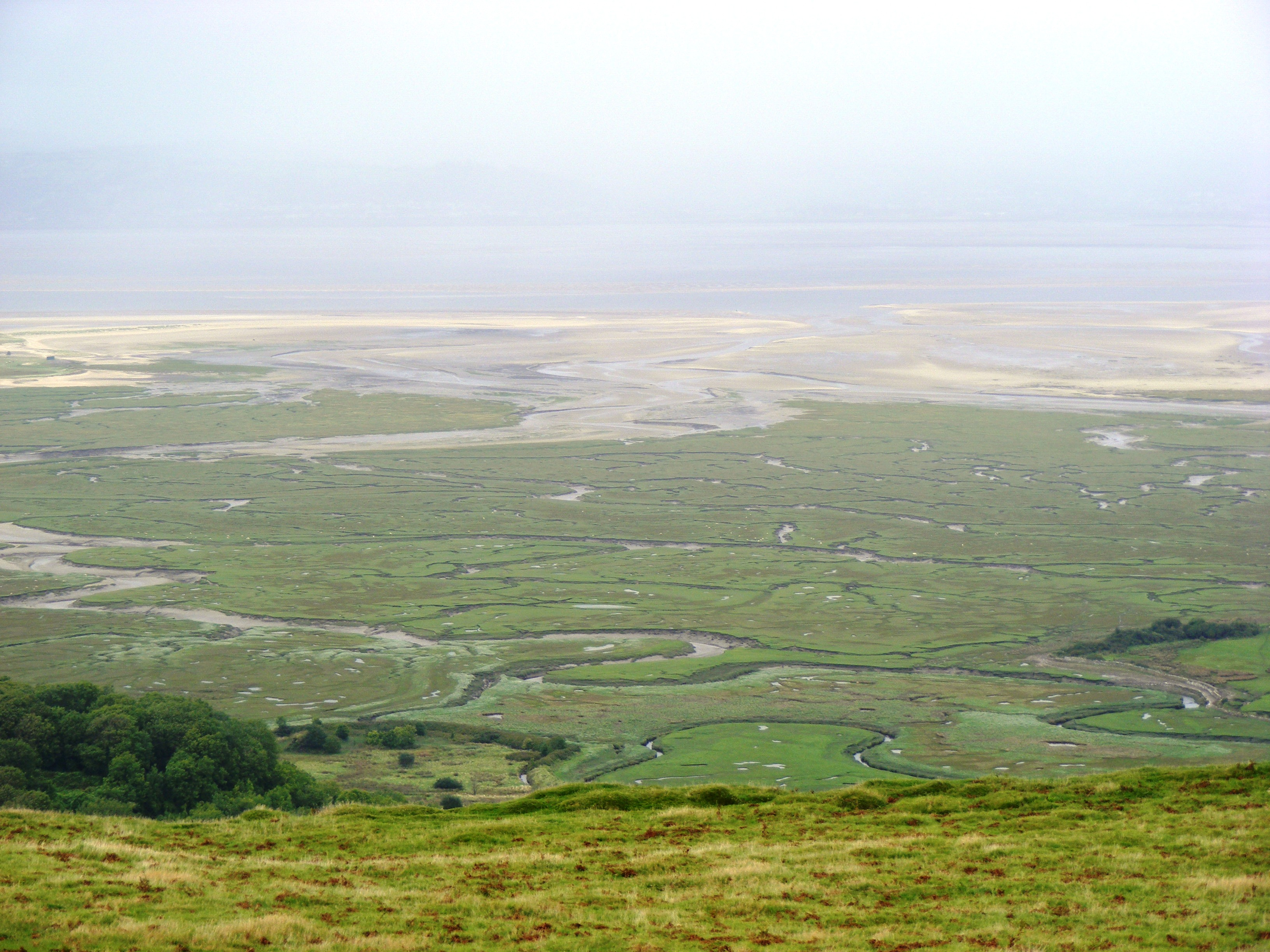
Whiteford National Nature Reserve

A later influence on the physical environment was the planting of cordgrass (Spartina anglica) to claim grazing land at the western end of the Gower side during the 1930s. This vigorous grass has since spread in a wide band all along the south side, forming the basis of a salt-marsh supporting the grazing of sheep, ponies and cattle.

The estuary is partly closed off by Whiteford Point, which extends from Llanmadoc in Gower towards Burry Port and Cefn Sidan in Carmarthenshire. This is now a National Nature Reserve maintained by the National Trust and Natural Resources Wales and is an area of sand dunes supporting several rare species. Just off the tip of the point is one of the few remaining cast-iron lighthouses, long since disused and in need of preservation.

During World War II several gun batteries were established to both the east and west of Penclawdd, where gun-barrels were calibrated and shells (of various types including high-explosive and mustard gas) were fired across the salt marsh towards Whiteford Point; quantities of unwanted munitions were also buried on the seaward side of this point. The area is regularly swept by the Royal Navy's bomb disposal team, although few shells are now recovered. Persistent rumours that anthrax biological warfare shells were tested against sheep in the estuary were finally substantiated in a reply to a parliamentary question from the late Tony Banks in January 1987. In the 1960s, the Ministry of Defence proposed to move its main artillery and explosives testing facility at Foulness, at the mouth of the River Thames, to a site between Burry Port and Kidwelly, which was already used in a very sporadic way as an air-to-ground rocket range. The intention was to make way for a planned third London airport. The proposal was vigorously resisted locally and was dropped when another airport site was agreed.

The estuary forms part of the "Burry Inlet and Loughor Estuary" Site of Special Scientific Interest (51.66°N 4.25°W), designated on 1 January 1972 in an attempt to conserve the area.

== Sources ==
- Problems of a Small Estuary, ed. A. Nelson-Smith & E.M.Bridges, Institute of Marine Studies (University College, Swansea) & West Glamorgan County Council, Swansea, 1977.
