= Ammanford Colliery Halt railway station =

Disused railway station in Carmarthenshire, Wales

Coordinates: 51.793632°N 3.979925°W

Ammanford Colliery Halt

General information
- Location: Ammanford, Carmarthenshire; Wales

Other information
- Status: Disused

History
- Original company: Great Western Railway
- Pre-grouping: Great Western Railway
- Post-grouping: Great Western Railway

Key dates
- 1 May 1905: Station opened
- 18 August 1958: Station closed
Location

Ammanford Colliery Halt railway station served the colliery near Ammanford, West Wales. Opened to serve the colliery, the station closed, leaving the current Ammanford station providing trains for the area.

== History ==
Opened by the Great Western Railway, the halt stayed with that company during the Grouping of 1923. The station then passed on to the Western Region of British Railways on nationalisation in 1948.

The station was then closed by the British Transport Commission.

== See also ==
- Ammanford railway station

Preceding station	Historical railways	Following station
Ammanford (GWR); Line and station closed	Great Western Railway	Glanamman; Line and station closed
