= Defiance Cycle Company =

Welsh bicycle company

The Defiance Cycle Company was formed in 1880 to produce bicycles in Wales. It was founded by two brothers of the Williams family, Arthur and William Williams who established the factory at the top of the Amman Valley.

They started making ordinary bicycles in 1878, and made their first chain-driven bicycle in late 1884 or 1885.

On Easter Monday, 9 April 1885, a chain-driven Defiance Cycle was ridden from the factory at Glanamman to Swansea and back, a distance of some 35 miles. Many people turned out to see this event, which is commemorated by riders tracing the ride route to Swansea.

The company thrived through the 1880s and in 1895 opened a retail premises in Eloff Street, Johannesburg, South Africa. to sell bicycles exported from Wales. Their manufacturer’s trademark changed to 'The Defiance Cycle Company of Glanaman & Johannesburg' to reflect this development.

They produced a motorcycle in 1901, but only for a short time. Arthur Williams & Co. continued to sell bicycles until Arthur's death in 1948.

Just three of these bicycles are known to be still in existence, one is in private ownership while the other two are in the museums of Birmingham and Carmarthen.

== See also ==
- List of bicycle manufacturing companies
