= Glanamman =

Village in Carmarthenshire, Wales

Coordinates: 51.806°N 3.923°W

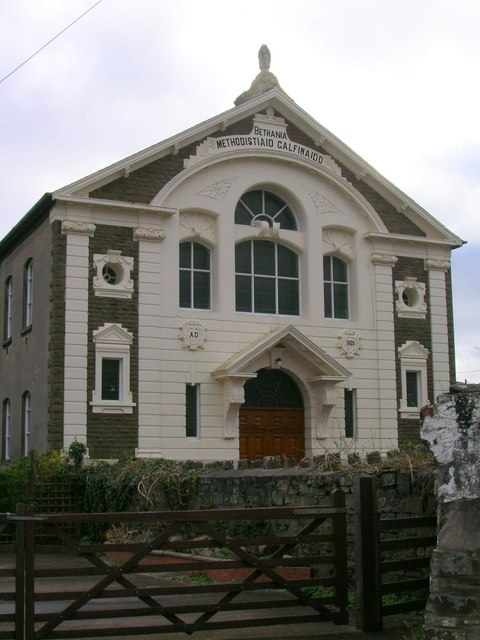
- Bethania Calvinistic Methodist Chapel

- Location within Carmarthenshire
- Population: 2,261 (2001 census)
- OS grid reference: SN675134
- Community: Cwmamman
- Principal area: Carmarthenshire
- Preserved county: Dyfed
- Country: Wales
- Sovereign state: United Kingdom
- Post town: AMMANFORD
- Postcode district: SA18
- Dialling code: 01269
- Police: Dyfed-Powys
- Fire: Mid and West Wales
- Ambulance: Welsh
- UK Parliament: Caerfyrddin
- Senedd Cymru – Welsh Parliament: Carmarthen East and Dinefwr

Glanamman (Welsh: Glanaman) is a mining village in the valley of the River Amman in Carmarthenshire, Wales. Glanamman has long been a stronghold of the Welsh language; village life is largely conducted in Welsh. Like the neighbouring village of Garnant it experienced a coal-mining boom in the 19th and early 20th centuries, but the last big colliery closed in 1947 and coal has been extracted fitfully since then.

== History ==
The location of Garnant and Glanamman was known as Cwmamman ("Amman valley") before coal was discovered; until the 18th century it was a remote wilderness with just a few farms and rough mountain roads. Mining appears to have started at Brynlloi in 1757 and small coal workings proliferated in the first half of the 19th century. The arrival of the railway in 1840 meant that coal could be exported on an industrial scale through Llanelli docks, and the construction of two stations at Glanamman and Garnant promoted a distinction between the two communities.

Taking its name from the emblem of the Dynevor family, the "Raven" colliery in Garnant was operating by 1854. In 1891, the Gelliceidrim Collieries Company opened what became the largest of the coal mines at Glanamman, employing 632 men in 1932. "The Gelly" was nationalised in 1947 and closed in 1957. Since then the area has seen some small private mines come and go, such as a drift mine on Grenig Road in the 1970s.

== Government ==
Cwmamman, the old name for the location of Glanamman and Garnant, was revived for the urban council covering the two villages which now have much smaller populations than in their heyday at the turn of the 20th century. Today Cwmaman Town Council forms the lowest tier of government, comprising 15 community councillors.

Glanamman is also the name of the county electoral ward covering the area around Glannaman village. The ward elects a county councillor to Carmarthenshire County Council.

Glanamman is in the unitary authority of Carmarthenshire. Adam Price of Plaid Cymru currently represents the village at the Welsh Assembly in the constituency of Carmarthen East and Dinefwr.The constituency is represented in Westminster by Jonathan Edwards, Independent, formerly of Plaid Cymru.

== Geography ==
The village is about 13 miles (21 kilometres) north of Swansea on the edge of the Black Mountain, in the westernmost part of the Brecon Beacons National Park. The River Amman flows through the village. Glanamman lies in the western part of the South Wales Coalfield, where the coal is particularly high-quality anthracite.

== Demography ==
The effect of the mining boom can be seen in the expansion of Cwmamman parish (including Garnant and surrounding villages) from just over 3,000 in 1851 to over 11,000 in the early 20th century. The population had declined to 2,261 people at the 2001 census, increasing to 2,347 at the 2011 Census. Garnant is a similar size.

== Economy ==
Traditionally the economy was based on coal-mining with some dairy farming, but the mines have closed and farms such as Gelli Fanwen have moved from milk production to beef-farming. The Raven Tinplate Works (sometimes confused with the Amman Tinplate Works in Garnant) were built on the site of the Cwmamman Brickworks in 1881. They operated until the early 1930s and were demolished after World War II; the site is now a council depot near the station.

== Culture and community ==
Since 1988 Cwmamman has been twinned with the village of Pouldergat, in Brittany. The village is a stronghold of the Welsh language, with 81% of the population able to speak it.

The first chain-driven bicycle in Wales and one of the first in the World was manufactured by the Defiance Cycle Company Glanamman and ridden to Swansea in 1885. This is commemorated on Easter Monday by retracing the same ride to Swansea.

== Landmarks ==
The valley has been shaped by coal workings and their waste, but little remains above ground. Brynseion Chapel's location at the corner of the High Street and the main road marks the centre of the village, but both it and Saint Margaret's Church (see below) are now closed.

== Transport ==
A turnpike road (now the A474) was constructed along the valley in 1817. The Llanelly Railway and Dock Company built the Llanelly Railway to Garnant in 1840. It was taken over by the GWR on amalgamation in 1923, and closed to passenger services by British Railways on 18 August 1958. Freight traffic continued until the closure of the Abernant Colliery in 1988. The Amman Valley Railway Society is seeking to restore the Abernant branch line as part of the Swansea 9 Lines project.

== Education ==
Glanamman used to have a primary school which opened in 1884 and closed in 2005. Glanamman was a category A, or Welsh medium school with most subjects taught in Welsh. Three local schools, Ysgol y Twyn, Ysgol Gynradd y Garnant and Ysgol Gynradd Glanaman, were merged to form Ysgol y Bedol (the Horseshoe School) on the north bank of the three rivers in Garnant. This primary school for ages 3–11 was opened in 2005. Ysgol y Bedol is also a Welsh medium school. The nearest secondary school is Ysgol Dyffryn Aman in Ammanford.

== Religious sites ==
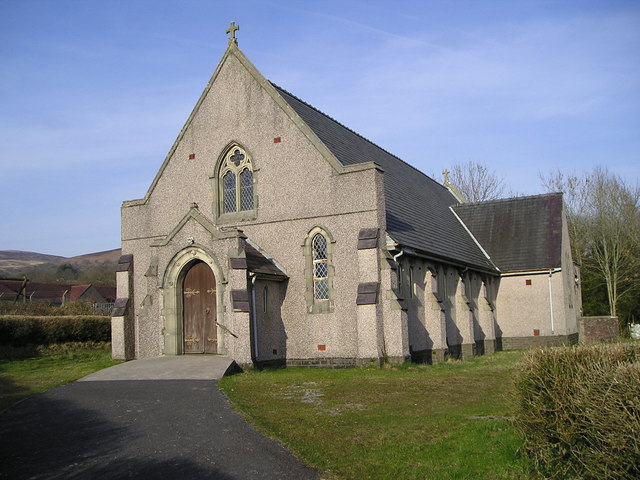
St Margaret's Church

The Welsh valleys have long been hotbeds of Nonconformism and Glanamman was no exception. Old Bethel Chapel, also known as The Old Meeting House, was built in 1773 high on the north side of the valley between Glanamman and Garnant. The Tabernacle Calvinistic Methodist Chapel and the Bethesda Baptist Chapel followed in 1840 and 1882 respectively. The prosperity at the turn of the 20th century can be seen in the ornate facade of the Bethania Calvinistic Methodist Chapel (1906–7) on Brynlloi Road and in the large Gothic-tinged Brynseion Independent Chapel (1909–10) nearby; Brynseion closed in 2004. Ammanford, a few miles down the valley, was a centre of the 1904–1905 Welsh Revival which saw thousands of new converts.

Anglicans worshipped at Christchurch in nearby Garnant during the 19th century but as with the Methodists they were prompted by the Revival to found a church in Glanamman itself. Saint Margaret's Church started in what is now the church hall, a corrugated iron building on Tirycoed Road, dedicated in 1907. The foundation stone of a new building was laid on 22 April 1933 and the church was dedicated on 1 November by the Lord Bishop of St. Davids. A lack of funds for essential repairs meant that the last regular service took place on Christmas Day 2008, but it is hoped to use the church for special services in future.

== Sport ==
Garnant Park (formerly Cwmamman Recreation Ground) was part of Lord Dynevor's Glanrafon Farm estate just east of Glanamman. It is home to Amman United RFC which was founded in 1903 and is a feeder club for the Scarlets regional team. Players who have gone on to rugby at international level include Claude Davey, Tom Day and Trevor Evans of the British Lions. Rugby international Shane Williams bought a disused industrial unit on Station Road which he converted into a CrossFit-franchised gym with bike hire and other facilities (now closed).

== Notable people ==
Those born or raised in Glanamman include:

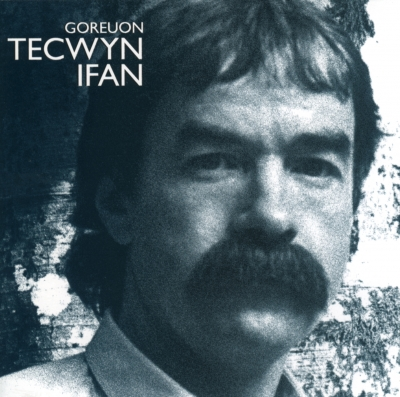
Tecwyn Ifan, album cover, 1995

- Arthur and William Williams, 19th C. founders of Defiance Cycle Company, the first cycle factory in Wales.
- W. D. Davies (1911–2001), Congregationalist minister, theologian, author and professor of religion.
- Ryan Davies (1937–1977), entertainer and actor
- Sharon Morgan (born 1949) Welsh language campaigner and actress, brought up in Glanamman
- David E. Evans (born 1950), professor of mathematics at Cardiff University, specialising in knot theory
- Tecwyn Ifan (born 1952), singer-songwriter
- Jeff Hughes (1965–2018), historian of science at Manchester University who researched physics and nuclear culture
- Sian Reese-Williams (born 1981), a Welsh actress,

=== Sport ===
- William Rees (1899–1968), a Welsh rugby union, and professional rugby league footballer
- Tom Day (1907–1980), rugby union player with 13 caps for Wales
- Dai Davies (born 1948), footballer with 52 caps for Wales
- Gerwyn Edwards (born 1953), cricketer
- Arwel Thomas (born 1974), rugby union player with 23 caps for Wales
- Shane Williams MBE (born 1977 in Morriston near Swansea), Welsh rugby international and TV presenter, grew up in Glanamman

== See also ==
- Black Mountain (range) - nearby hills
- Garnant - neighbouring village which shares much of Glanamman's history
