= Lower Brynamman =

Electoral ward of Neath Port Talbot, Wales

Coordinates: 51.80602°N 3.87823°W

Lower Brynamman: Welsh: Brynaman Isaf
- Location within Neath Port Talbot
- Population: 1,330 (2011census)
- OS grid reference: SN706136
- Principal area: Neath Port Talbot
- Preserved county: West Glamorgan
- Country: Wales
- Sovereign state: United Kingdom
- Post town: PORT TALBOT
- Postcode district: SA18
- Dialling code: 01269
- Police: South Wales
- Fire: Mid and West Wales
- Ambulance: Welsh
- UK Parliament: Neath
- Senedd Cymru – Welsh Parliament: Neath
- Councillors: Arwyn Woolcock (Labour)

Lower Brynamman is an electoral ward of Neath Port Talbot county borough in Brynamman, Wales.

== Electoral ward ==
The electoral ward of Lower Brynamman forms part of the parish of Gwaun-Cae-Gurwen. The ward consists of some or all of the settlements of Gwaun-Cae-Gurwen, Lower Brynamman and Tairgwaith in the parliamentary constituency of Brecon, Radnor and Cwm Tawe. The ward has settlements to the far east; however, most of the ward is dominated by current and disused open cast mine workings. It is bounded by the wards of Quarter Bach of Carmarthenshire to the north, Cwmllynfell to the south east, and Gwaun-Cae-Gurwen to the south west.

In the May 2017 Neath Port Talbot County Borough Council election, the results were:

Candidate	Party	Votes	Status
Arwyn Woolcock	Labour	439	Labour hold
Robert Smith	Plaid Cymru	93	

In the 2012 local council elections, Arwyn Woolcock of the Labour Party was returned unopposed.
