= Fan Hir =

Mountain (760m) in Powys, Wales

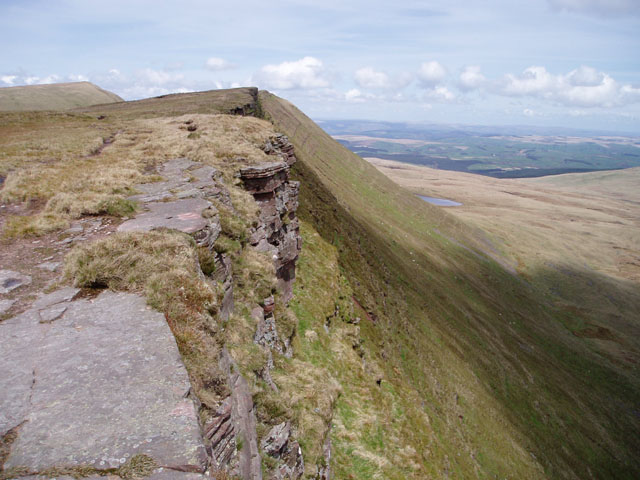
- Fan Hir summit ridge

Highest point
- Elevation: 760 m (2,490 ft)
- Prominence: 43 m (141 ft)
- Parent peak: Fan Brycheiniog
- Listing: Hewitt, Nuttall
- Coordinates: 51.8736°N 3.6996°W

Naming
- English translation: long beacon
- Language of name: Welsh

Geography
- Location: Powys, Wales
- Parent range: Brecon Beacons
- OS grid: SN825217

Fan Hir is a peak at the eastern end of the Black Mountain (Y Mynydd Du) in the Brecon Beacons National Park (Parc Cenedlaethol Bannau Brycheiniog) in southern Wales. It is a subsidiary summit of Fan Brycheiniog. It falls within the county of Powys and is also a part of the traditional area of Fforest Fawr. Its Welsh name means "long peak", a fitting description, particularly if seen from the east when its steep eastern face is seen to advantage. It is about 2.5 miles or 4 km long and faces east. Its summit is 2490 feet (about 760m) above sea level. Fan Hir is separated from its higher neighbour to the north-west, Fan Brycheiniog (2633 feet or 802 metres) by a col known as Bwlch Giedd, where a path rises from Llyn y Fan Fawr via a stone staircase.

The hill is drained to east and north by streams which make their way into the River Tawe.

== Geology ==
The peak is formed from sandstones of the Brownstones Formation and the overlying Plateau Beds Formation of the Old Red Sandstone laid down during the Devonian period. In accord with a regional trend, the beds dips southwards into the South Wales Coalfield basin. A notable feature of the hill is the prominent ridge of Fan Fechan (the 'little peak') which parallels the main ridge below it to the east. It is largely composed of broken Old Red Sandstone and has been interpreted as either a glacial moraine or as a pro-talus rampart. The peak is within the Fforest Fawr Geopark designated in 2005 in recognition of the area's geological heritage.

== Archaeology ==
The escarpment overlooks a famous Welsh stone circle, Cerrig Duon (or black stones) which are likely of British Bronze Age date, although it has never been excavated scientifically. There is a large standing stone, Maen Mawr, and a small stone avenue close by which are associated with the circle. The standing stone is about 5 feet high, and can be seen from a distance when driving down the Trecastle to Abercraf road. The monuments are close to the road further on, but cannot be seen directly from there, so the visitor must cross the River Tawe and climb the bank to view the site. There is another standing stone further north and east, and not far from the same minor road. There are many other ancient remains extant on the moor, such as hut circles and house platform as well as traces of cultivation such as lynchets. The climate was much warmer then and the area well wooded showing that timber was available locally for structural use.

== Access ==
The entire hill is open country and thus available for walkers to roam at will, although there is much peat bog off route, which can be difficult to cross. The path along the ridge is popular and forms a part of a circuit. The views from the edge of the escarpment are spectacular with Pen y Fan and Corn Du visible on the skyline to the east, and Fan Gyhirych closer in Fforest Fawr. The Beacons Way long distance footpath runs beneath Fan Hir on the east affording close-up views of this impressive hill. The path leads to the glacial lake of Llyn y Fan Fawr and then climbs up the escarpment via a stone staircase of even gradient to the bwlch below Fan Brycheiniog. The stone path is well drained and dry, and there is little exposure to steep drops.

== See also ==
- List of Scheduled prehistoric Monuments in Carmarthenshire
- List of Scheduled prehistoric Monuments in Powys (Brecknockshire)
