= Glanamman railway station =

Disused railway station in Glanamman, Carmarthenshire

Glanamman
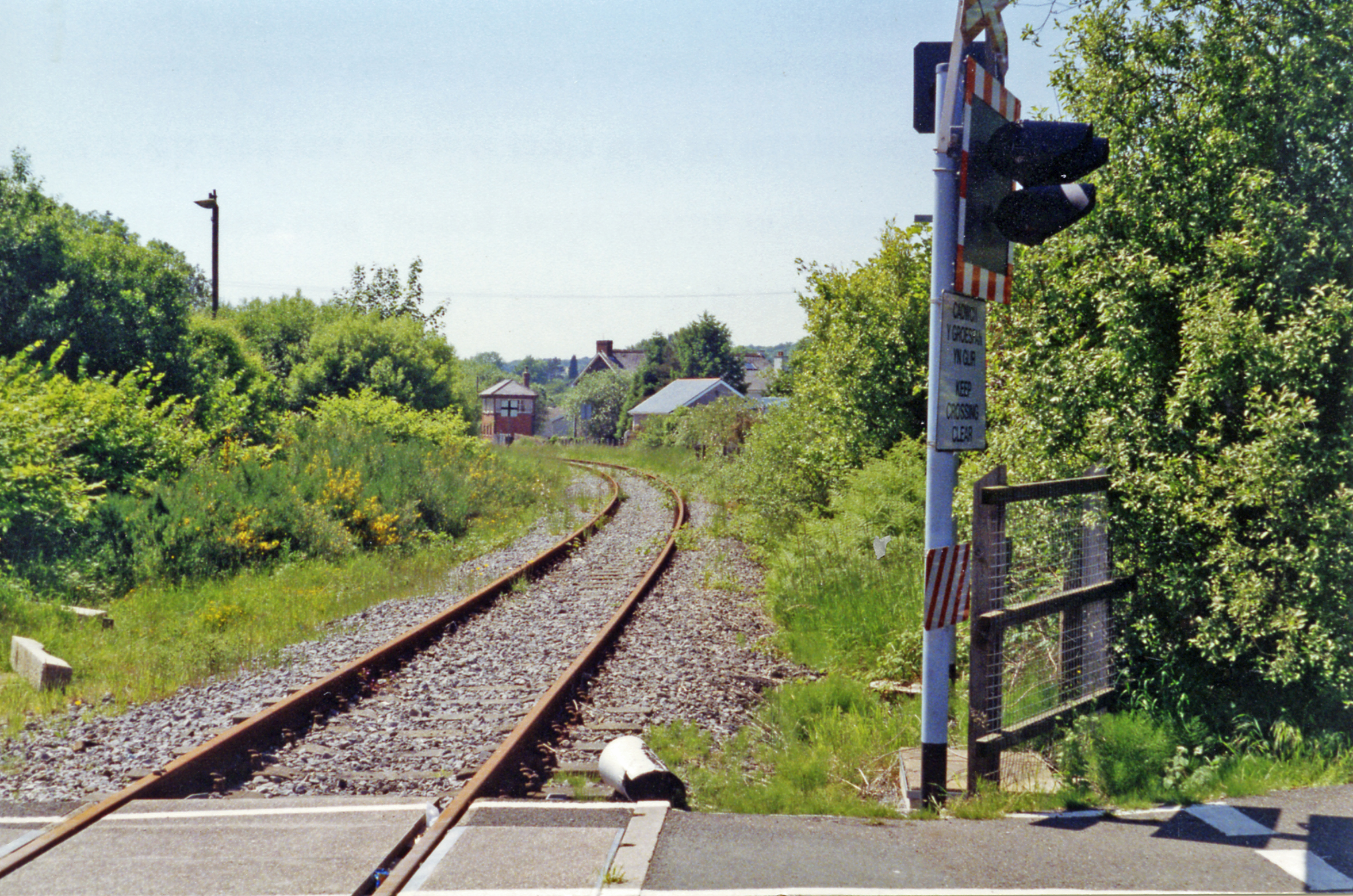
- The site of the station, looking west towards Pantyfynnon, in 1994

General information
- Location: Glanamman, Carmarthenshire; Wales
- Coordinates: 51.8061°N 3.9236°W
- Grid reference: SN674136
- Platforms: 1

Other information
- Status: Disused

History
- Original company: Llanelly Railway and Dock Company
- Pre-grouping: Great Western Railway
- Post-grouping: Great Western Railway; British Railways (Western Region)

Key dates
- May 1851: Opened as Cross Keys
- 1 December 1884: Name changed to Glanamman
- 18 August 1958: Closed for passengers
- 30 January 1965: closed for goods
Location

Glanamman railway station served the village of Glanamman, Carmarthenshire, Wales, from 1851 to 1958 on the Llanelly Railway.

== History ==
The station was opened as Cross Keys in May 1851 by the Llanelly Railway and Dock Company. It was situated on Station Road. In 1910, the stationmaster was David T Williams and by 1923 the stationmaster was Benjamin Thomas. The station closed to passengers on 18 August 1958 but it remained open for goods traffic until 30 January 1965.

Preceding station	Disused railways	Following station
Gelliceidrim; Line and station closed	Llanelly Railway and Dock Company	Ammanford Colliery Halt; Line and station closed
