= Ammanford railway station (GWR) =

Disused railway station in Ammanford, Carmarthenshire

Coordinates: 51.791054°N 3.986149°W

Ammanford
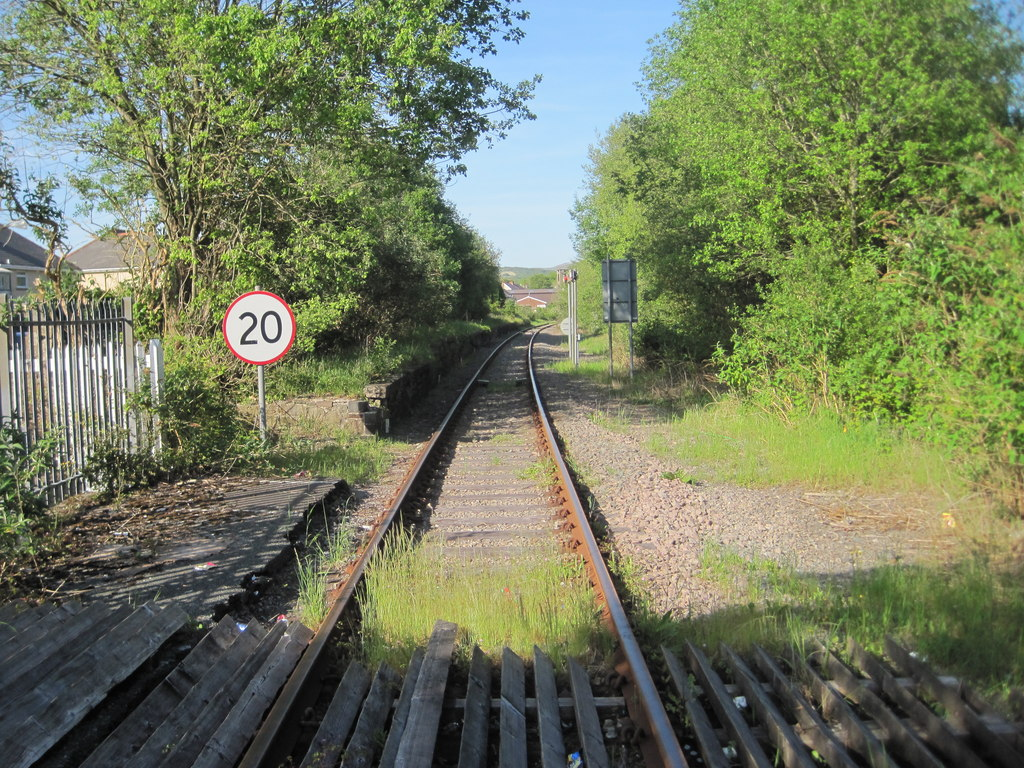
- Site of Ammanford Station

General information
- Location: Ammanford, Carmarthenshire; Wales

Other information
- Status: Disused

History
- Original company: Llanelly Railway
- Pre-grouping: Great Western Railway
- Post-grouping: Great Western Railway

Key dates
- 10 April 1840: Station opened as Cross Inn
- 1 July 1883: Station renamed Ammanford
- 18 August 1958: Station closed
Location

Ammanford railway station was opened under the name Cross Inn by the Llanelly Railway in 1840 to serve the town of Ammanford, West Wales. It was renamed Ammanford in 1883. The station was the main one in the town until it closed in 1958, leaving the current Ammanford station (then known as Tirydail, later Ammanford & Tirydail) providing trains for the area.

== History ==
Opened by the Llanelly Railway, then by the Great Western Railway, staying with that company during the Grouping of 1923. The station then passed on to the Western Region of British Railways on nationalisation in 1948.

The station was then closed by the British Transport Commission.

== See also ==
- Ammanford Colliery Halt railway station
- Ammanford railway station

Preceding station	Historical railways	Following station
Pantyffynnon; Line closed, station open	Great Western Railway	Ammanford Colliery Halt; Line and station closed
