= Llygad Llwchwr =

Cave in Wales

Coordinates: 51°50′35″N 3°56′00″W

- Interactive map of Llygad Llwchwr
- Location: Black Mountain range, Brecon Beacons National Park
- OS grid: SN 669 178
- Length: 1.2km
- Discovery: first recorded exploration by Thomas Jenkins in 1841
- Geology: Limestone
- Access: Free
- Translation: "Eye of the river Loughor" (Welsh)

Llygad Llwchwr is a 1.2 km-long cave system in the Black Mountain which forms the westernmost range of the Brecon Beacons National Park in Wales. The first record of the cave being explored dates back to 1841.

The entrance to the cave system is 400m from the road alongside a public footpath, and just above and to the left of an obvious river resurgence.

The cave contains a dry high level series and an active river level which is accessible at a number of river chambers separated by sumps. Beyond the fourth river chamber exploration is only possible by cave diving. The rest of the cave is suitable for novice cavers.

The cave has been the subject of biospeleology research, with the Androniscus dentiger, and Niphargus fontanus, a form of shrimp, being found throughout the cave system.
