= Ammanford railway station =

Railway station in Carmarthenshire, Wales

Ammanford Welsh: Rhydaman
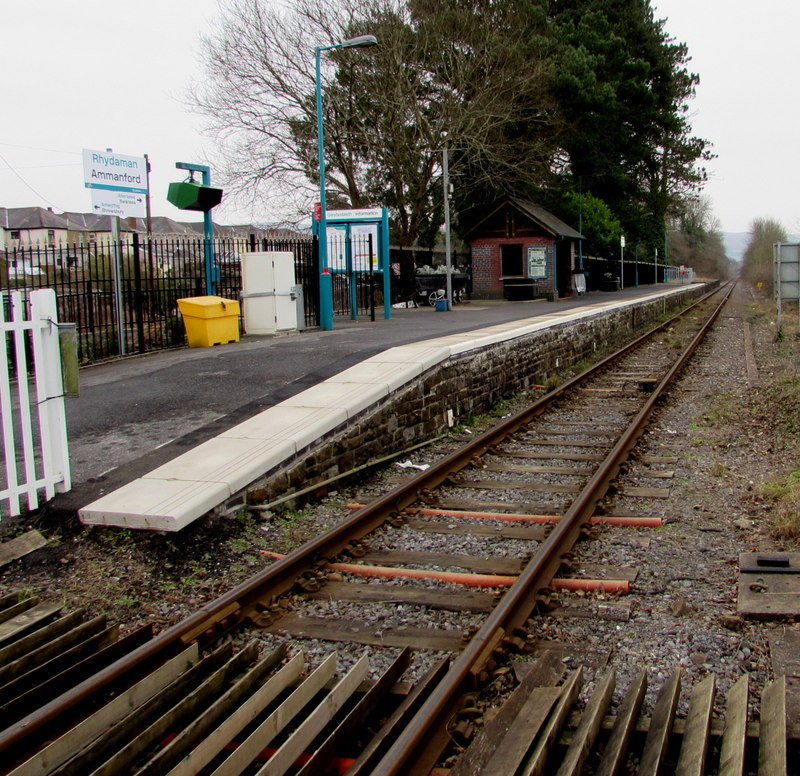

General information
- Location: Ammanford, Carmarthenshire; Wales
- Coordinates: 51.7951°N 3.9959°W
- Grid reference: SN623126
- Manager: Transport for Wales
- Platforms: 1

Other information
- Station code: AMF
- Classification: DfT category F2

History
- Original company: Llanelly Railway
- Pre-grouping: London and North Western Railway
- Post-grouping: London, Midland and Scottish Railway

Key dates
- 6 May 1841: Opened as Duffryn
- 1 July 1889: Renamed Tirydail
- September 1960: Renamed Ammanford and Tirydail
- 6 September 1965: Renamed Ammanford and Tirydail Halt
- 5 May 1969: Renamed Ammanford and Tirydail
- 7 May 1973: Renamed Ammanford

Passengers
- 2021/22: ▲7,348
- 2022/23: ▲11,010
- 2023/24: ▲16,062
- 2024/25: ▲23,694
- 2025/26: ▲24,654
Location
Notes
- Passenger statistics from the Office of Rail and Road

Ammanford railway station in Ammanford, Carmarthenshire, Wales, is 12 miles (19 km) north of Swansea on the Heart of Wales Line. The station opened in 1841 as a temporary terminus of the Llanelly Railway's line to Llandeilo, making it one of the country's earlier railway stations.

Originally called Duffryn, and then Tirydail, the station underwent a number of name changes before being renamed Ammanford and Tirydail in 1960 following the closure in 1958 of Ammanford station on the Amman Valley branch railway. In 1973, it became Ammanford.

The station stands at street level about 800 m (870 yd) northwest of Ammanford town centre on Station Road. At some point between 1891 and 1906 the passenger platform was moved from the north to the south side of the level crossing. As with most of the stations on the Heart of Wales Line, the original station buildings and signal box have been demolished and now the only structures are a platform and shelter.

== History ==
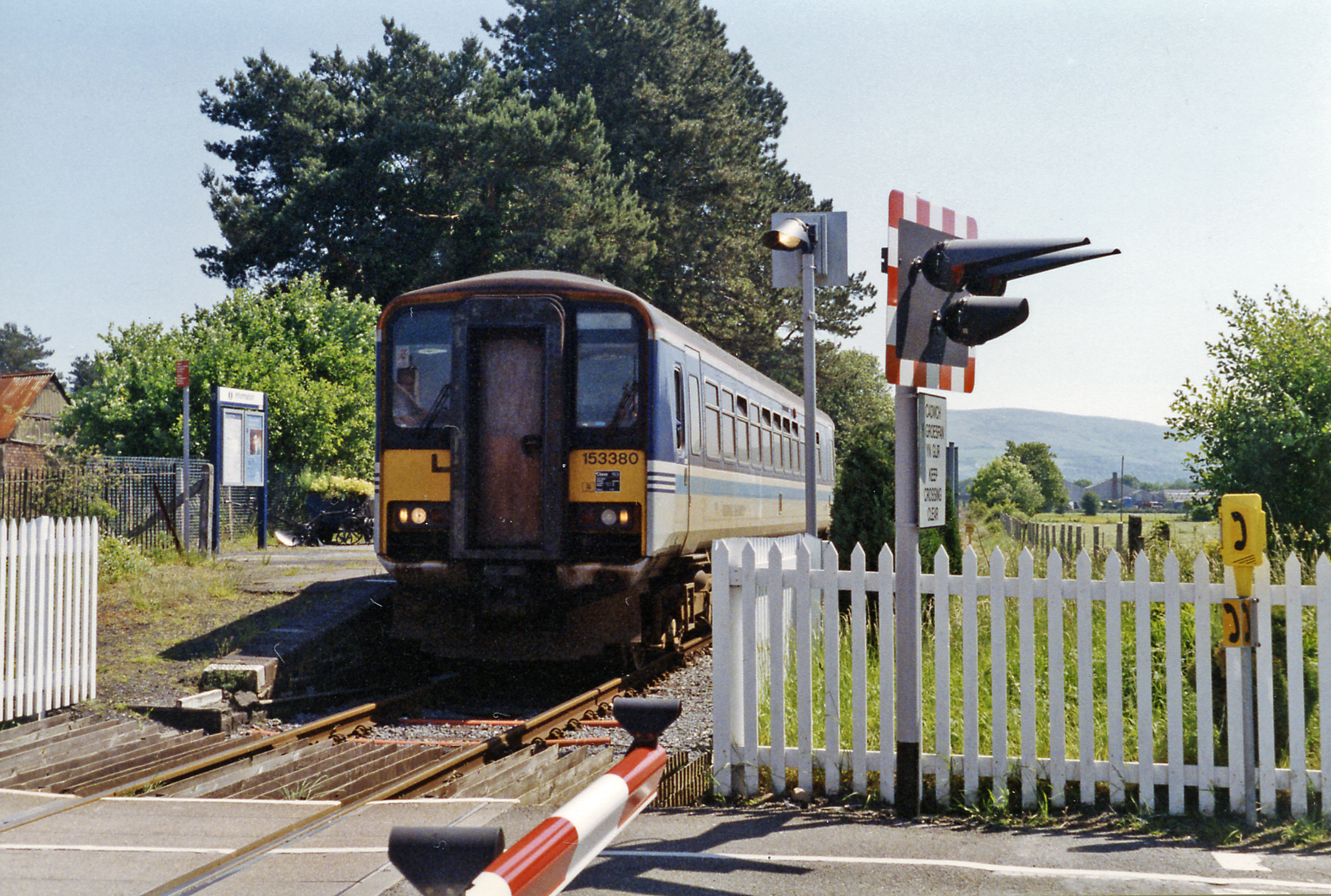
From the crossing, 1994

Opened by the Llanelly Railway on 6 May 1841, the station was taken over jointly by the Great Western Railway and London and North Western Railway in 1873. It became part of the London, Midland and Scottish Railway as a result of the Grouping of 1923. The station then passed, upon nationalisation of the railways in 1948, to the Western Region of British Railways. Under British Rail sectorisation from the 1980s until railway privatisation, Ammanford station was served by Regional Railways.

The station also had a passing loop until 1966, but this was removed when the line's signalling was simplified and many of the intermediate signal boxes (and some stations) closed when the Heart of Wales line was rationalised.

== Facilities ==
Amenities at the station are basic (despite it being one of the largest towns served on the route), with no ticket provision of any kind (these must be bought on the train or prior to travel). As well as the aforementioned shelter and a bicycle rack, there is a customer help point at the station entrance and a digital CIS display to provide real-time train running information.

== Services ==
All trains serving the station are operated by Transport for Wales. There are five trains a day to Shrewsbury northbound from Monday to Saturday (plus another to Llandovery) and six southbound to Llanelli and Swansea (the first train in each direction does not run on Saturdays); two services each way call on Sundays. Northbound trains must stop here for the train crew to activate the controls for the half-barrier level crossing, but for southbound trains it is a request stop (as the crossing is operated automatically by approaching trains).

Preceding station	National Rail	Following station
Pantyffynnon	Transport for Wales; Heart of Wales Line	Llandybie
	Historical railways	
Parcyrhun Halt	London and North Western Railway; Shrewsbury to Llanelli Line	Llandybie
