= Tecwyn Ifan =

Welsh singer and songwriter (born 1952)

Tecwyn Rhys Ifan
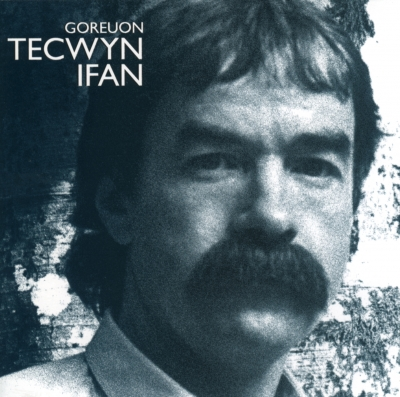
- Born: May 1952 (age 73–74); Glanamman, Wales
- Occupations: Singer, Baptist minister

Tecwyn Ifan is an influential Welsh singer and songwriter from Glanamman, Carmarthenshire, Wales. He was a Baptist minister in Pembrokeshire for many years, and was a member of the group Perlau Taf during the 1960s and 1970s and, in 1972, formed a band with Cleif Harpwood, Iestyn Garlick and Phil Edwards ("Phil Small"). He is the father of Gruffudd Ifan, drummer in the band Texas Radio.

== Discography ==
- Y Dref Wen (Sain), 1977
- Dof Yn Ôl (Sain), 1978
- Goleuni Yn Yr Hwyr (Sain), 1979
- Edrych I’r Gorwel (Sain), 1981
- Herio’r Oriau Du (Sain), 1983
- Stesion Strata (Sain), 1990
- Y Goreuon (Sain), 1995
- Sarita (Sain), 1997
- Wybren Las (Sain), 2005
- Llwybrau Gwyn (Sain), 2012
