= Llandybie railway station =

Railway station in Carmarthenshire, Wales

Llandybie Welsh: Llandybïe
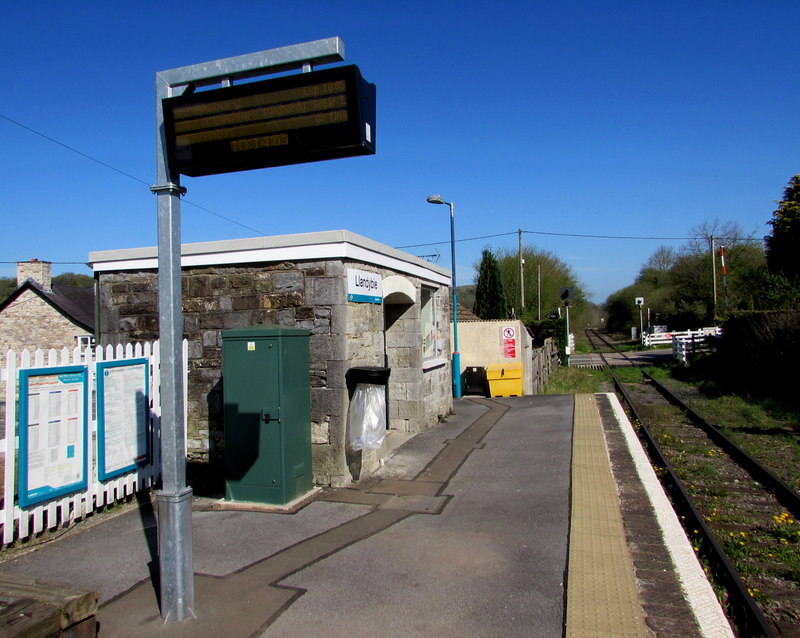

General information
- Location: Llandybie, Carmarthenshire; Wales
- Coordinates: 51.821°N 4.004°W
- Grid reference: SN619154
- Manager: Transport for Wales
- Platforms: 1

Other information
- Station code: LLI
- Classification: DfT category F2

History
- Opened: 1857

Passengers
- 2021/22: ▲3,074
- 2022/23: ▲4,770
- 2023/24: ▲6,940
- 2024/25: ▲8,604
- 2025/26: ▼8,254
Location
Notes
- Passenger statistics from the Office of Rail and Road

Llandybie railway station serves the village of Llandybie near Ammanford, Carmarthenshire. The railway station is located below street level just off Kings Road. This is a convenient stop for Glynhir Estate and Glynhir Falls. Two miles (3 km) from the station is the Llandybie 18-hole golf course.

All trains serving the station are operated by Transport for Wales. For trains travelling south this is a request stop, but those travelling north have to make a mandatory call so that the train driver can press the plunger on the platform that activates the warning lights & barriers at the adjacent level crossing over the A483 prior to departure.

When the original station was replaced, the signal box was saved and can be found on the Gwili Railway at Bronwydd Arms.

== Facilities ==
Amenities at the station are basic. There is no ticket provision (so all tickets have to be purchased on the train or in advance) and only a single stone waiting shelter is provided, along with a timetable poster board, Digital CIS display and customer help point next to the station entrance. Step-free access is available from the car park to the platform, but the connecting ramp is quite steep and assistance may be required for disabled passengers wishing to travel from here.

== Services ==
There are five trains a day to Shrewsbury northbound from Monday to Saturday (plus a sixth to Llandovery) and six southbound to Llanelli & Swansea (the first train in each direction does not run on Saturdays); two services each way call on Sundays.

Preceding station	National Rail	Following station
Ammanford	Transport for Wales; Heart of Wales Line	Ffairfach
