= Gerwyn Edwards =

Welsh cricketer

Personal information
- Full name: Gerwyn Edwards
- Born: 22 June 1953 (age 73); Glanamman, Carmarthenshire, Wales
- Batting: Left-handed
- Bowling: Left-arm medium

International information
- National side: Wales

Domestic team information
- Years: Team
- 1988–1995: Wales Minor Counties

Career statistics
Competition	List A
Matches	2
Runs scored	33
Batting average	33.00
100s/50s	–/–
Top score	28*
Balls bowled	72
Wickets	1
Bowling average	36.00
5 wickets in innings	–
10 wickets in match	–
Best bowling	1/36
Catches/stumpings	1/–
- Source: Cricinfo, 12 February 2011

William Gerwyn Edwards (born 22 June 1953) is a former Welsh cricketer. Edwards was a left-handed batsman who bowled left-arm medium pace. He was born in Glanamman, Carmarthenshire.

Edwards represented Wales in the 1979 ICC Trophy, playing two matches against the Netherlands and Israel. In 1988, he made his debut for Wales Minor Counties in the Minor Counties Championship against Buckinghamshire. From 1988 to 1995, he represented the team in twenty-eight Championship matches, the last of which came against Cornwall. He played just the two MCCA Knockout Trophy fixtures for the team, against Staffordshire and Cumberland in 1994 and 1995 respectively. It was also in 1994 that he made his List A debut for the team against Sussex in the 1993 NatWest Trophy 1st round, following that up the following season with his second and final appearance in that format against Middlesex. In his two List A matches he scored 33 runs at a batting average of 33, with a high score of 28*. With the ball he took a single wicket at a bowling average of 36.00.
