= Pouldergat =

Pouldergat Pouldregad
- Commune
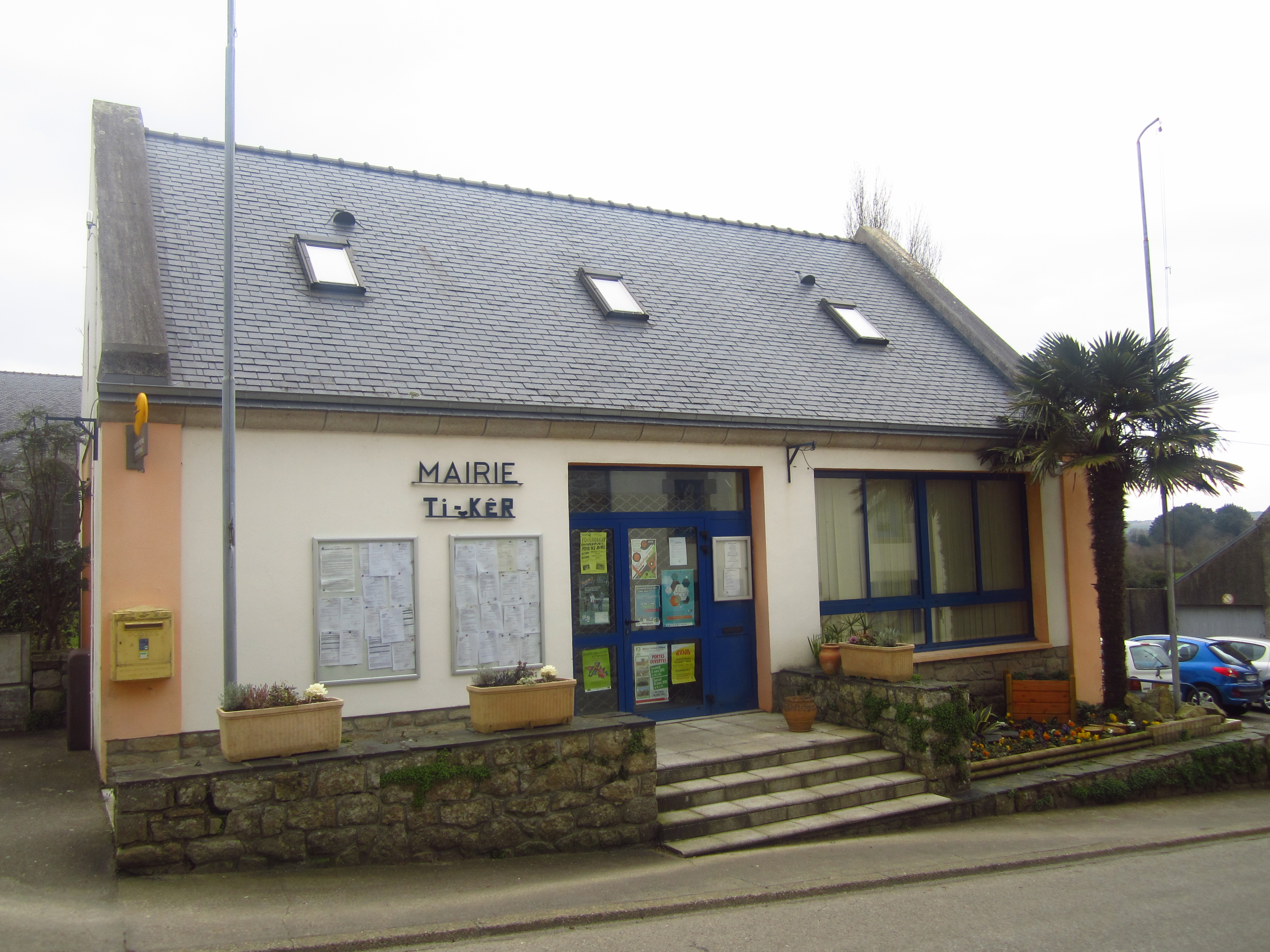
- The town hall in Pouldergat

- Flag
- Location of Pouldergat
- Location within France Location within Brittany
- Coordinates: 48°02′39″N 4°19′33″W
- Country: France
- Region: Brittany
- Department: Finistère
- Arrondissement: Quimper
- Canton: Douarnenez
- Intercommunality: Douarnenez Communauté

Government
  - Mayor (2020–2026): Henri Savina
- Area^{1}: 24.39 km^{2} (9.42 sq mi)
- Highest elevation: 133 m (436 ft)
- Lowest elevation: 8 m (26 ft)
- Population (2023): 1,213
  - Density: 49.73/km^{2} (128.8/sq mi)
- Time zone: UTC+01:00 (CET)
  - Summer (DST): UTC+02:00 (CEST)
- INSEE/Postal code: 29224 /29100
- ^{1} French Land Register data, which excludes lakes, ponds, glaciers > 1 km^{2} (0.386 sq mi or 247 acres) and river estuaries.

Pouldergat (French pronunciation: [puldɛʁɡat]; Breton: Pouldregad) is a commune in the Finistère department of Brittany in north-western France.

== International relations ==
Pouldergat is twinned with the village of Glanamman, in Wales.

== Population ==
Inhabitants of Pouldergat are called in French Pouldergatois.

== Breton language ==
The municipality launched a linguistic plan through Ya d'ar brezhoneg on 31 October 2005.

== See also ==
- Communes of the Finistère department
