= Quarter Bach =

Community in Carmarthenshire, Wales

Coordinates: 51.822°N 3.831°W

- Community
- Location within Carmarthenshire
- Principal area: Carmarthenshire
- Country: Wales
- Sovereign state: United Kingdom
- Police: Dyfed-Powys
- Fire: Mid and West Wales
- Ambulance: Welsh
- List of places UK Wales Carmarthenshire Map of the community

Quarter Bach (Welsh: Cwarter Bach) is a community located in the east of Carmarthenshire, Wales.

== Description ==
It is at the foot of the Black Mountain, in the far east of the county. The main settlement here is Upper Brynamman, though it also includes Cefn-Bryn-Brain, Rhosamman and Ystradowen, as well as a substantial amount of open moorland. The community is bordered by the communities of: Cwmamman; Llangadog; and Llanddeusant, all being in Carmarthenshire; by Ystradgynlais in the unitary authority of Powys; and by Cwmllynfell and Gwaun-Cae-Gurwen in the unitary authority of Neath Port Talbot.

According to the 2001 Census, 75.2% of people in Quarter Bach can speak Welsh, the highest percentage of any ward in Carmarthenshire and indeed in the southern half of Wales.

The actual quoted population at the 2011 Census was 2,921.

== History ==
The civil parish was created on 23 December 1881, prior to this the area was a part of the parish of Llangadock.

== Governance ==
At the most local level, Quarter Bach is governed by Cwarter Bach Community Council.

Cwarter Bach (Quarter Bach until May 2022) is the name of the county electoral ward, which is represented by one county councillor on Carmarthenshire County Council.
