= Llyn y Fan Fawr =

Lake in Powys, Wales

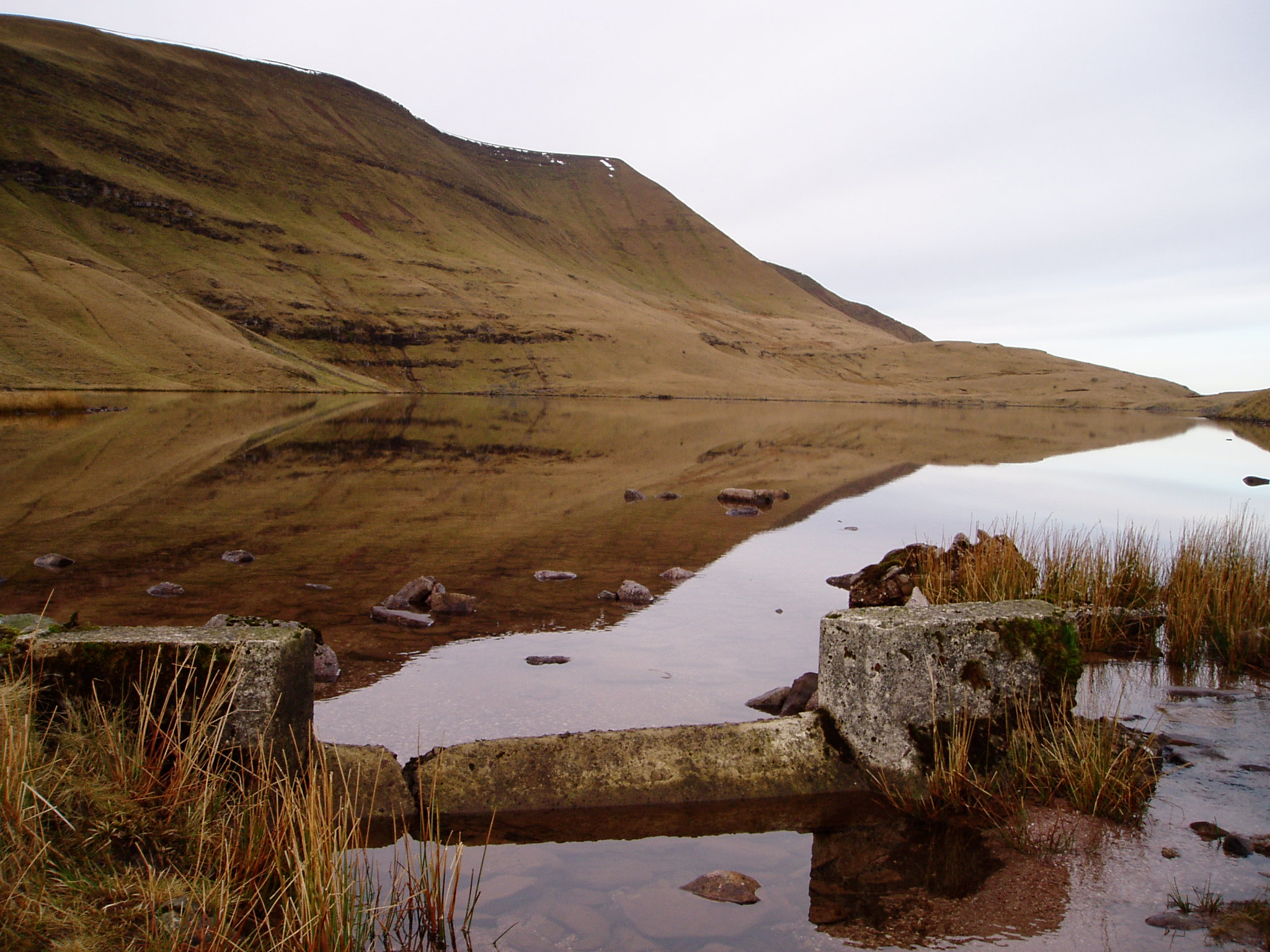

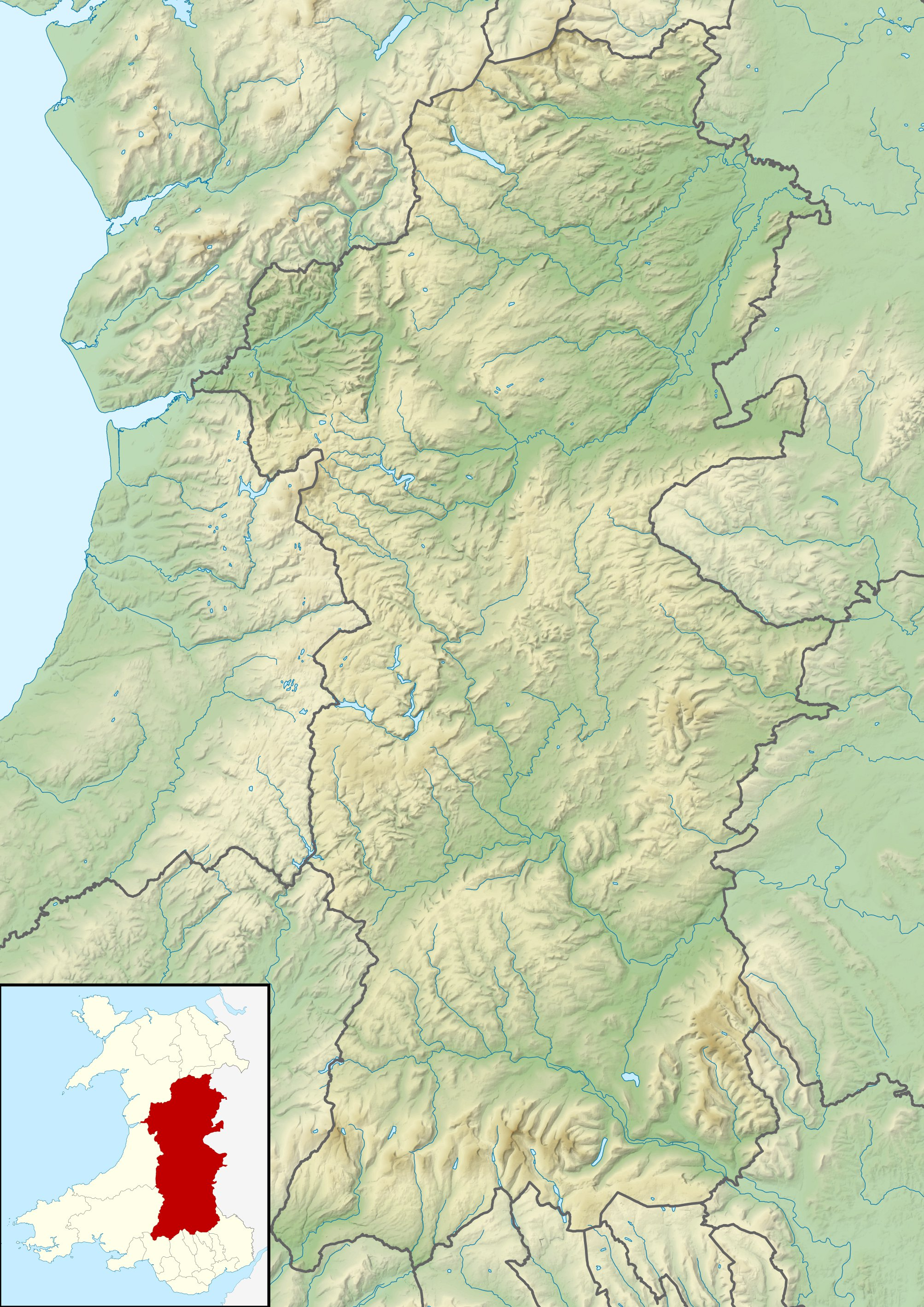
- Location within Powys
- Location: Powys, Wales
- Coordinates: 51°52′52″N 3°42′0″W
- Type: natural
- Primary outflows: Nant y Llyn, tributary of River Tawe
- Basin countries: United Kingdom
- Surface elevation: 605 m (1,985 ft)

Llyn y Fan Fawr (Welsh for 'great lake of the peak') is a natural lake in the county of Powys, Wales. It lies at the foot of Fan Brycheiniog, the highest peak of the Black Mountain (Y Mynydd Du) range within the Brecon Beacons National Park. Created as a result of glacial action, it is one of the largest glacial lakes in southern Wales.

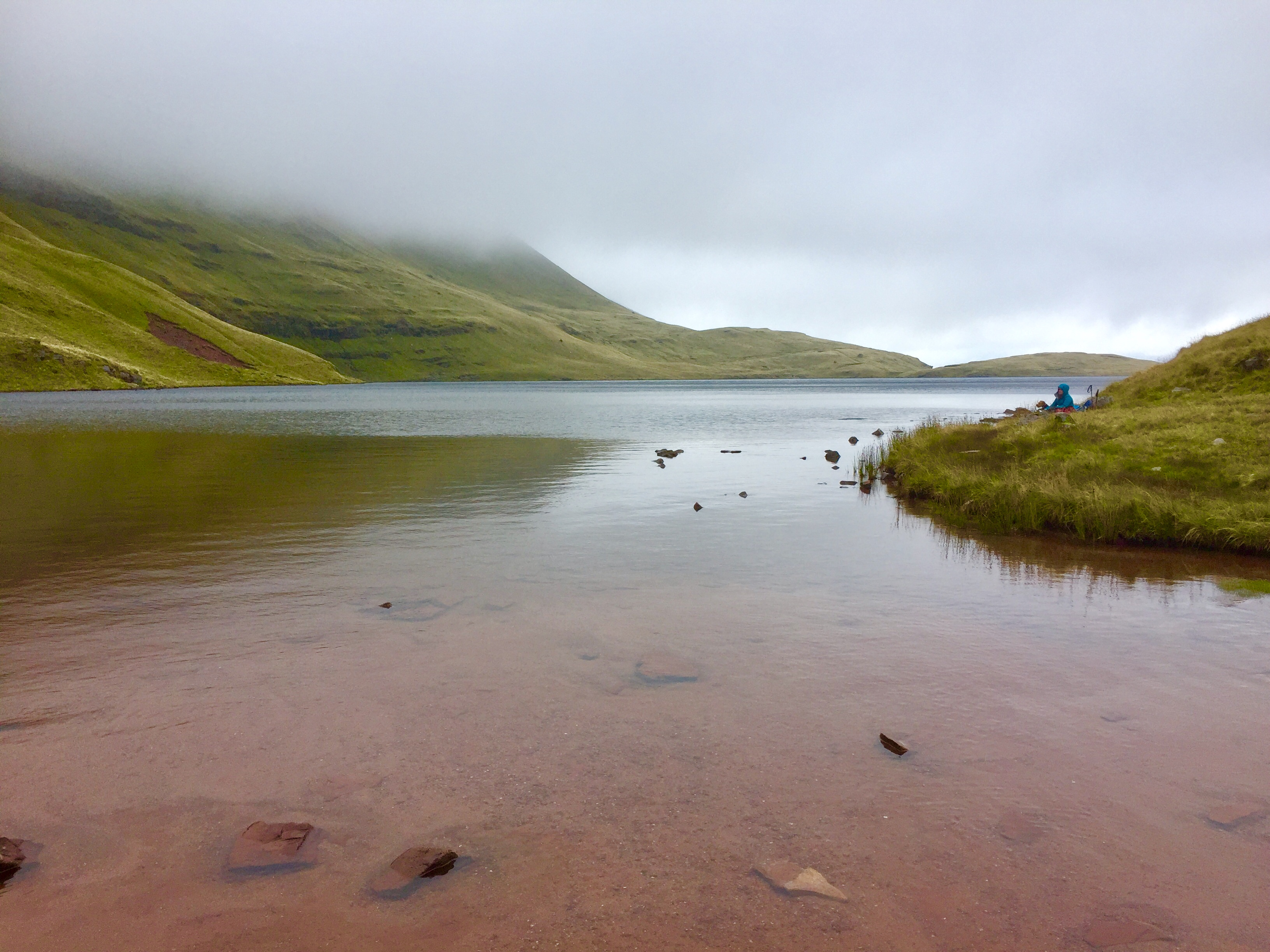
The lake from a small beach

Shoreweed and quillwort are found here whilst greater water-moss occurs on boulders at the water's edge. Freshwater limpets, caddisflies and leeches are also recorded. However, as regards fish, a C17th manuscript asserts that it "hathe no fishe attaile in't nither will any fish being put into it live, but as soon as they have tasted of this water turne up their silver bellies and suddenly dey."

The surface of Llyn y Fan Fawr lies at about 1815 feet or 605m above sea level. Its primary outflow is to the River Tawe. Much of the land around the lake is peaty and thus wet underfoot. The main route of the Beacons Way runs along the ridge above the lake whilst its low-level alternative wraps around the lake's eastern margin.
