= Parcyrhun Halt railway station =

Disused railway station in Ammanford, Carmarthenshire

Parcyrhun Halt

General information
- Location: Ammanford, Carmarthenshire; Wales
- Coordinates: 51.7872°N 3.9974°W
- Grid reference: SN623117
- Platforms: 1

Other information
- Status: Disused

History
- Original company: Great Western Railway
- Post-grouping: Great Western Railway

Key dates
- 4 May 1936: Opened
- 13 June 1955: Closed
Location

Parcyrhun Halt railway station served the town of Ammanford, Carmarthenshire, Wales from 1936 to 1955 on the Llanelly Railway.

== History ==
The station opened on 4 May 1936 by the Great Western Railway. It closed to both passengers and goods traffic on 13 June 1955.

| Preceding station | Disused railways | Following station |
|---|---|---|
| Ammanford (Tirydail); Line closed, station open | Great Western Railway; Llanelly Railway | Llanelli; Line closed, station open |
