= Abernant Colliery =

Coal mine in South Wales (1954–1988)

Coordinates: 51°45′33″N 3°52′58″W

Abernant Colliery was a coal mine in the River Amman valley at Pwllfawatkin, 4 miles (6.4 km) north of Pontardawe and 13 miles (21 km) north of Swansea, West Wales.

== Development ==
Abernant was developed by the National Coal Board as one of the West Wales "super pits" alongside Cynheidre Colliery in the Gwendraeth valley, an investment intend to keep economic coal mining a viable industry in the area.

The £10million development began in 1954, with the sinking of two of the deepest shafts in the coalfield to allow access to the Peacock anthracite seam. The North (upcast) was 837 yards (765 m) and the South 987 yards (903 m) deep respectively. Two insets were also driven, No.3 at 692 yards (633 m) and No.4 at 792 yards (724 m) deep respectively.

== Operations ==
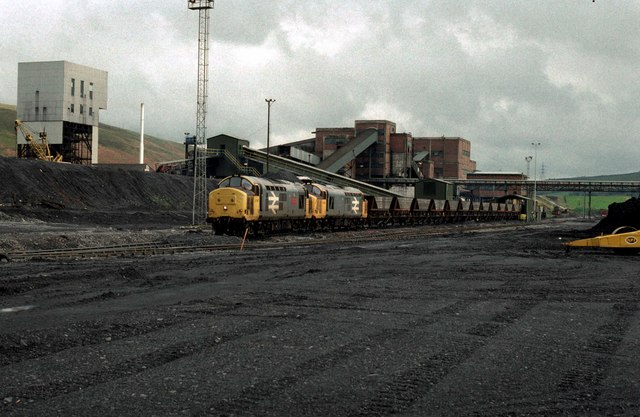
A pair of British Rail Class 37 locomotives load coal from the already closed Abernant Colliery, 1989

Production started two years later, with coal extracted along the Amman Valley branch of the former Llanelly Railway and Dock Company, and on to the mainline at Pantyffynnon.

In 1962, the colliery developed access to the Red Vein seam, resulting in the abandonment of the lower Peacock seams from 1963. The result was that during the 1970s, 900 men produced an average of 300,000 tonnes of coal per annum, from a system that covered 8 square miles (21 km^{2}) with over 40 miles (64 km) of roadway.

The colliery was one of the first NCB pits to deploy retreat mining, whereby roadways were driven to the limit of the coal reserves, and then the coal faces then worked towards the pit bottom.

== Closure ==
Abernant closed in 1988.

== Present ==
In September 2011, Waste Recycling Group Ltd submitted plans for the development of an anaerobic digestion facility on the old colliery site. Proposed to run on food waste collected from 350,000 homes in Bridgend, Carmarthenshire, Neath Port Talbot, Pembrokeshire and Swansea, the 2.3 MW facility would be capable of generating enough electricity to meet the demands of approximately 5,000 homes, and producing fertiliser.
