= Amman Valley Railway =

Heritage railway in west Wales

Coordinates: 51°46′44″N 3°59′49″W

The Amman Valley Railway Society (Welsh: Rheilffordd Dyffryn Aman) is situated near the former Gwaun Cae Gurwen branch line, that runs alongside the River Amman, some 10 miles (16 km) north of Swansea in west Wales. Its primary focus is to construct Swansea 9 Lines, an eco-friendly tram system to the heart of Swansea and the surrounding areas. The project was originally based on a heritage railway proposal on a lines that formerly served the various collieries of the area north of Swansea and Llanelli.

In 2014 the Abernant Branch line had been cleared, along with a station platform, track beds and unearthed railway lines, all of which were being restored.

== The Society ==
AVRS (Amman Valley Railway Society) was formed in 1992 with 84 founder members, became a registered charity in 2004, incorporated in 2006 and grew to become a Social Enterprise Company in 2008, after opening shops in Brynamman, Ammanford, Pontardawe and in Gwaun-Cae-Gurwen.

== Swansea 9 Lines Project ==
The AVRS project aims to attract tourists, create trade and connect the countryside to the coastal areas of Swansea. The aim is for the railway to reintroduce public passenger services using "low carbon footprint" tram services over nine routes, spreading throughout the Carmarthenshire, Neath & Port Talbot, and Swansea areas. The route is planned to link up with the Heart of Wales line to provide services from North Wales and England.

The services would run in both directions from 06:00 to midnight, covering a population in excess of 370,000 and serving 29 destinations.

== Branch Line history ==
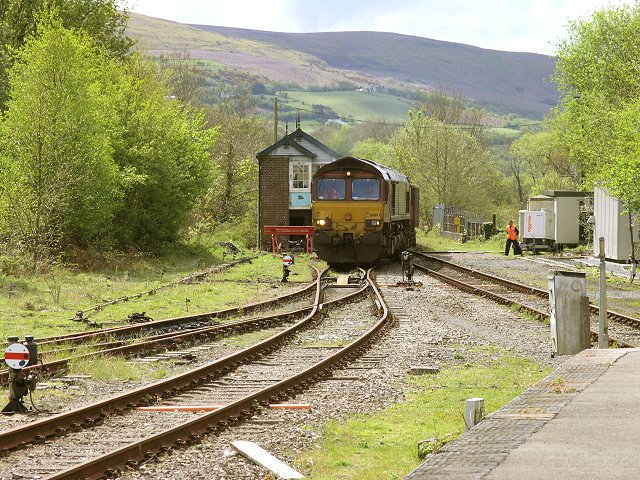
EWS Class 66 joins the Amman Valley railway branch just south of Pantyffynnon, as it heads towards the opencast mine near Gwaun-cae-Gurwen

Originally developed by the Llanelly Railway and Dock Company, which by 1840 had reached Pantyffynnon. Here the railway branched, with the Amman Valley developed for commercial purposes to transport extracted coal to North Dock, Llanelli. The eventual plan was to develop the line as far as Clydach on the Morriston Loop, but this never happened.

Taken over by the Great Western Railway on amalgamation in 1923, its stock was converted to standard GWR rural practices. The line was closed to passenger services by British Railways on 18 August 1958, ahead of the Beeching Axe, although it did stay open as a freight route until the closure of the Abernant Colliery super pit in 1988.

== Former rolling stock ==
In mid-2006, a British Rail Class 103 diesel multiple unit (DMU) vehicle was saved from scrapping in Coventry by AVRS, moving it to Swansea for later restoration and possible eventual use on the line, but was passed over to an Essex Museum for restoration in 2008. This was M50397, of the Denbigh & Mold Junction Railway, which was scrapped at Swansea in 2009.

The Society once owned three tank wagons (from the Swansea Vale Railway) at Cwmgors which were gradually being refurbished ready for use on the heritage line section. They have received offers of several locomotives from various organizations and patrons.
