= North Dock, Llanelli =

Former industry dock in Llanelli, Wales

Coordinates: 51.67522°N 4.17322°W

North Dock is a former industrial dock in Llanelli, West Wales used mainly for exporting coal and tin plate from South Wales. It is also the name of the area immediately surrounding the dock. Llanelli Beach is also known locally as North Dock.

With the decline of heavy industry in south Wales, the dock is no longer used to export goods, and has been redeveloped for leisure. There is also a large development of residential apartments surrounding the dock, and plans to develop more leisure and business units.
