= River Amman =

Coordinates: 51.78006°N 3.9937°W

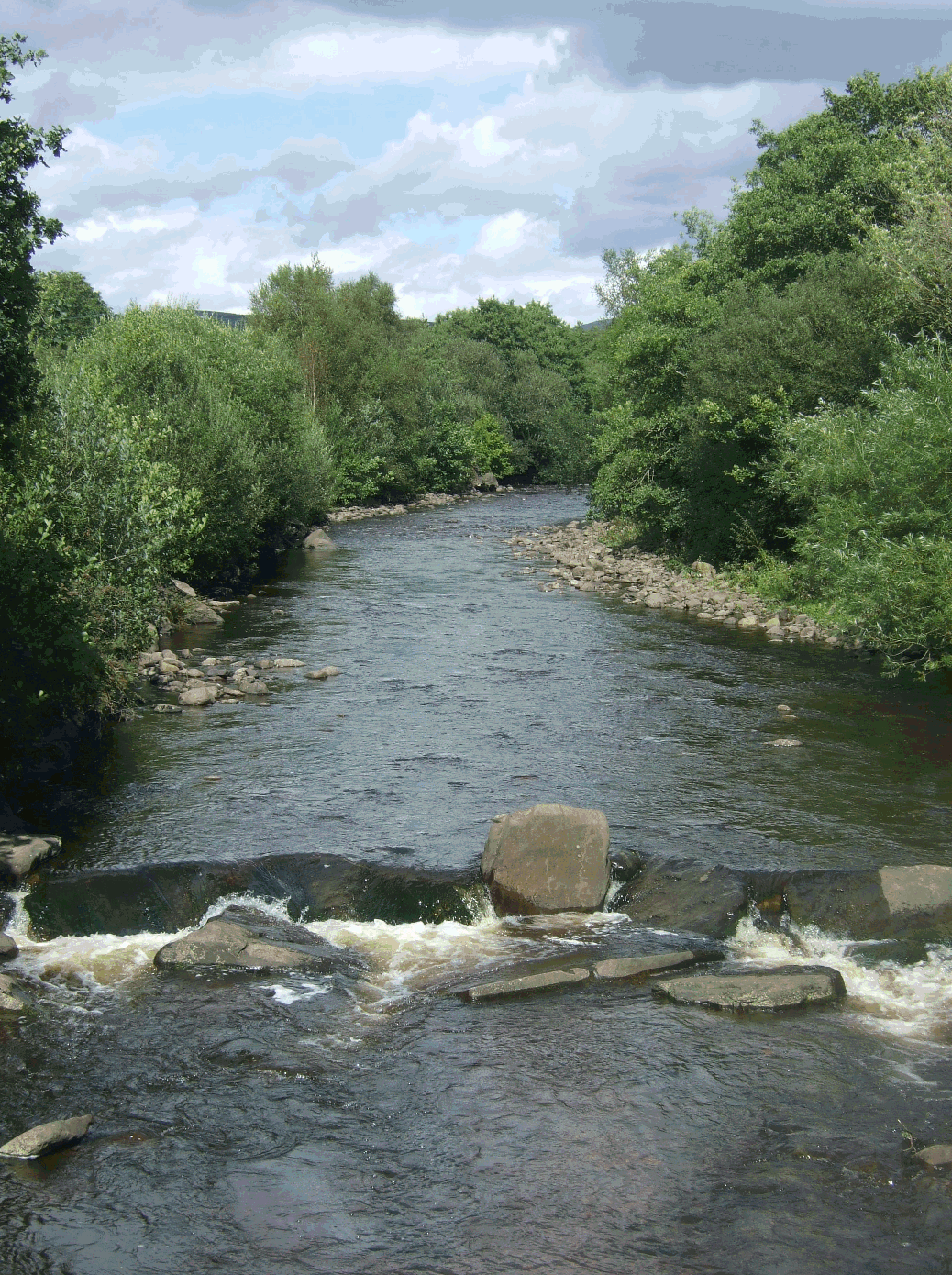
- The River Amman between Ammanford and Betws looking towards the Black Mountain.
- Native name: Afon Aman (Welsh)

Location
- Country: Wales

Physical characteristics
- Source
  - location: Black Mountain
- Mouth: Confluence with River Loughor

The River Amman (Welsh: Afon Aman) is a river of south Wales, which joins the River Loughor at Pantyffynnon. The source of the Amman is on the Black Mountain.

The river name is said to derived from the Welsh word banw "pig, piglet", reflecting the way in which it roots through the land like a pig. It gives its name to the town of Ammanford and the villages of Pontamman, Glanamman, Brynamman and Rhosamman. Garnant and Betws also lie in the Amman Valley - Garnant and Glanamman were formerly known as Cwmamman and it is now the name of their combined urban council. Garnant railway station was originally known as Amman Valley, the English version of Cwmamman. In the 19th and early 20th centuries the valley was a booming coal-mining area, but the mines have now closed.
