= Black Mountain (range) =

Mountain range, west of Brecon Beacons, Wales

Coordinates: 51.88144°N 3.70848°W

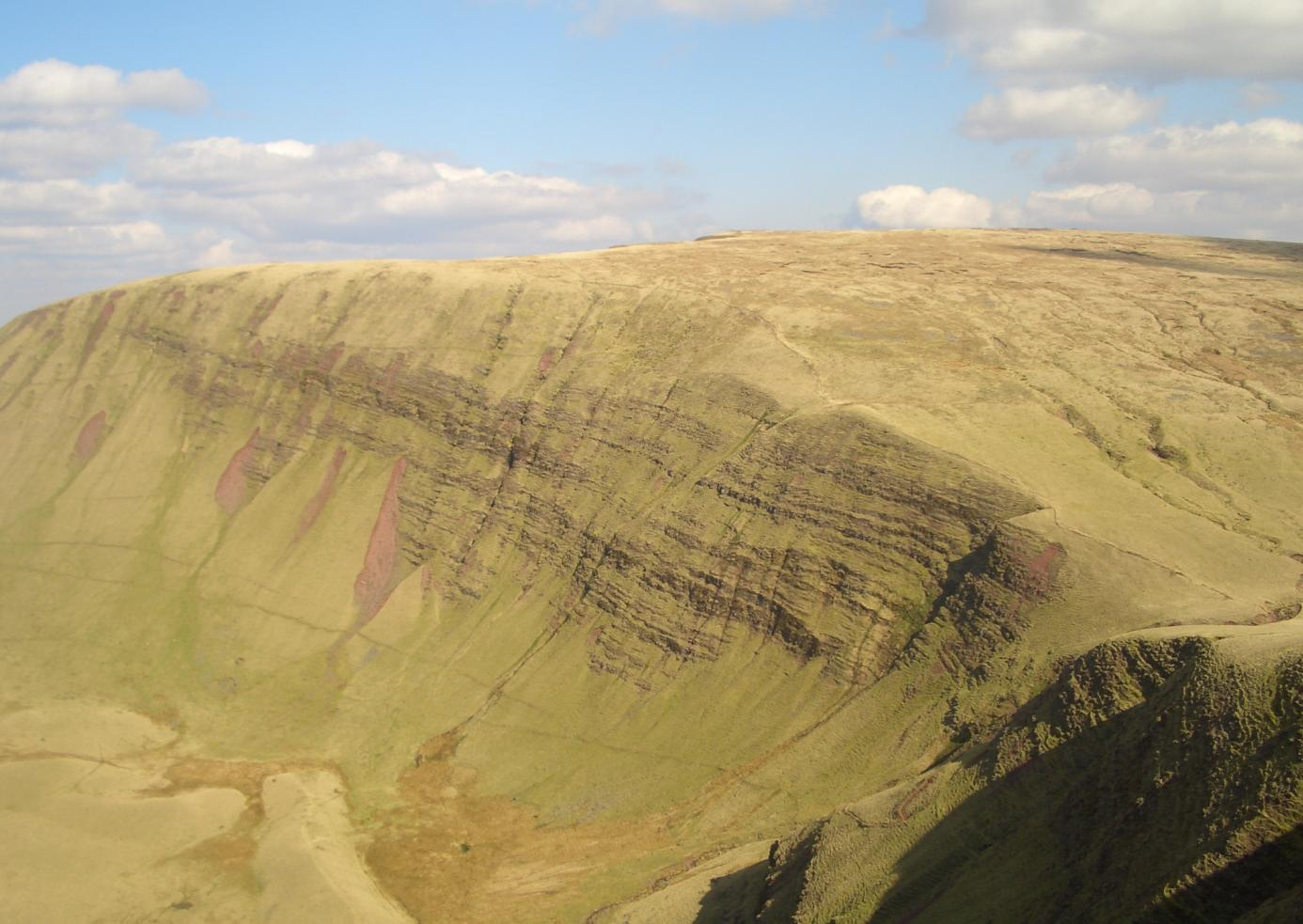
Fan Brycheiniog, the highest peak on the Black Mountain

The Black Mountain (Welsh: Y Mynydd Du) is a mountain range in South, Mid and West Wales, straddling the county boundary between Carmarthenshire and Powys and forming the westernmost range of the Brecon Beacons National Park. Its highest point is Fan Brycheiniog at 802 metres or 2,631 ft. The Black Mountain also forms a part of the Fforest Fawr Geopark.

== Name ==
The Black Mountain should not be confused with the Black Mountains in the east of the National Park, nor with a 703 metres (2,306 ft) summit in the Black Mountains that is confusingly also called Black Mountain. In his description of a Blak Montayne, the antiquarian John Leland refers to a massif extending between Carmarthen and Monmouth i.e. what is now considered to be the Brecon Beacons in the wider modern sense of that term, thus also including the Black Mountains and the intervening high ground of Fforest Fawr.

The term "Carmarthen Fans" (Welsh: Bannau Sir Gâr) is sometimes used inaccurately to describe the whole of this massif, whereas it should be restricted to the peaks along the northern escarpment within Carmarthenshire (the peak of Fan Brycheiniog lies east across the border into historic Brecknockshire). The "Carmarthen Fans" thus includes Fan Foel, Picws Du and Waun Lefrith. The highest point of the "Carmarthen Fans" and the county top of Carmarthenshire is thus the minor summit of Fan Foel, height 781 metres (2,562 ft).

== Geology ==
The range stretches approximately from Ammanford in the south-west to Sennybridge in the north-east. The larger part of these hills is formed from Devonian age Old Red Sandstone, though bands of Carboniferous Limestone and of Twrch Sandstone are important landscape-forming rocks in the south and west of the range. The Plateau Beds form a protective cap over some of the eastern summits. They also form steep cliffs just below the edge of the escarpment. The area was glaciated during the ice ages and a number of fresh moraines are to be found beneath the spectacular north and east facing sandstone scarps in the north-east of the range, especially below Fan Hir. There are smaller moraines lying immediately below the cliffs of Waun Lefrith and Picws Du.

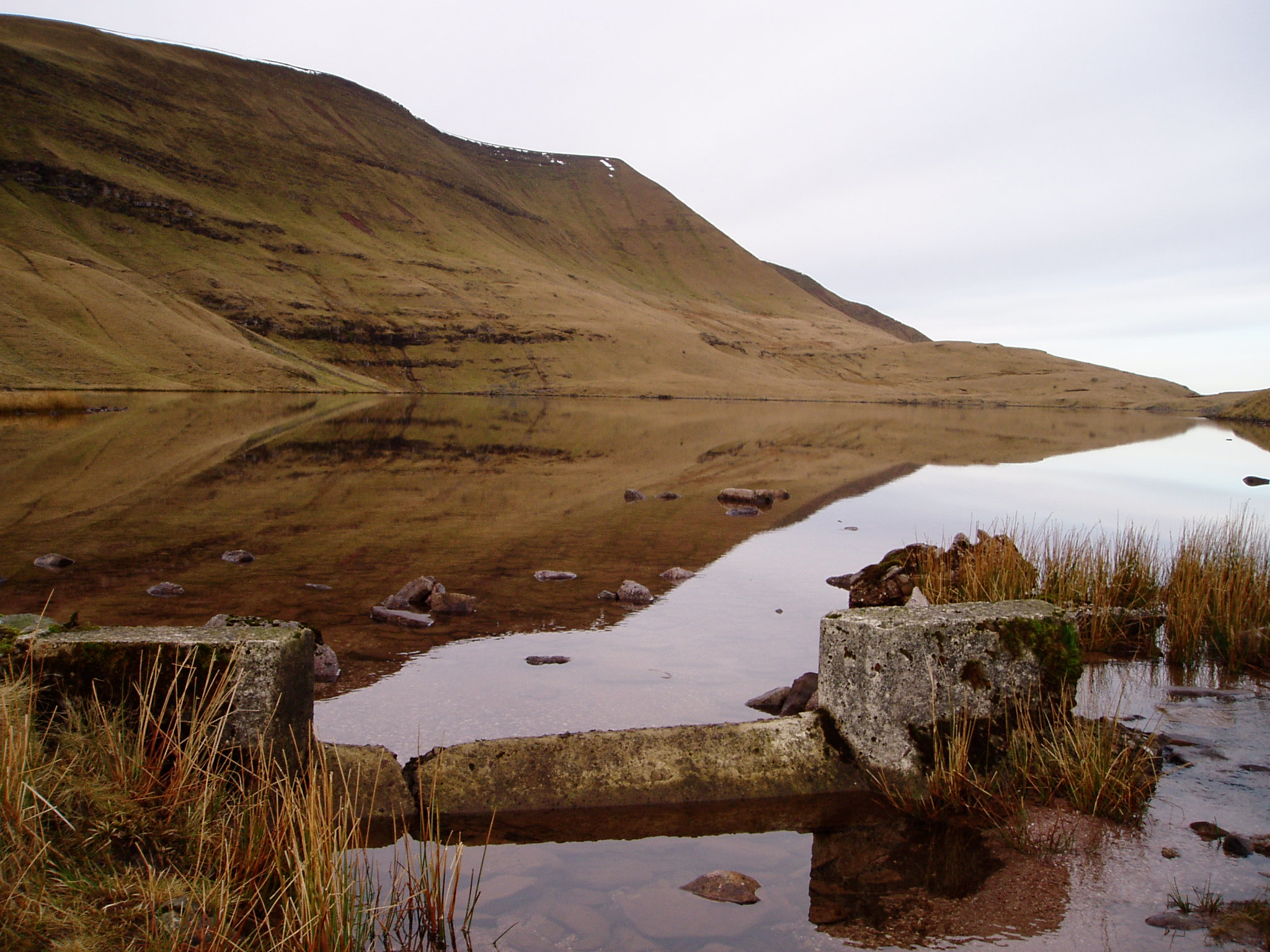
Llyn y Fan Fawr, below Fan Brycheiniog in the Black Mountain

The lakes below the escarpment of Llyn y Fan Fawr and Llyn y Fan Fach are also a legacy of glacial action.

== Archaeology ==
There are many surviving remains, especially prehistoric and Roman, in the area. They include the marching camps or castras at Mynydd Bach Trecastell. There are numerous menhirs, round barrows and several small stone circles. An especially famous circle occurs on the banks of the River Tawe below Fan Hir, and is known as Cerrig Duon, or "black stones". There is a standing stone outside the circle nearby, known as Maen Mawr, with two smaller stones forming a small avenue. There is also evidence of human settlements, hut circles and agriculture. Recent excavation of a cairn or round barrow on Fan Foel showed it to be of early Bronze Age in date (circa 2000 BC) and there is a very similar unexcavated round barrow on Picws Du. The excavation at Fan Foel indicated that the moorland was well-wooded in Bronze Age Britain owing to a warmer climate than at present, with much of the present moorland covered by hazel scrub with oak at lower heights, though the higher land is tree-less in its current sub-arctic state.

== Drainage ==
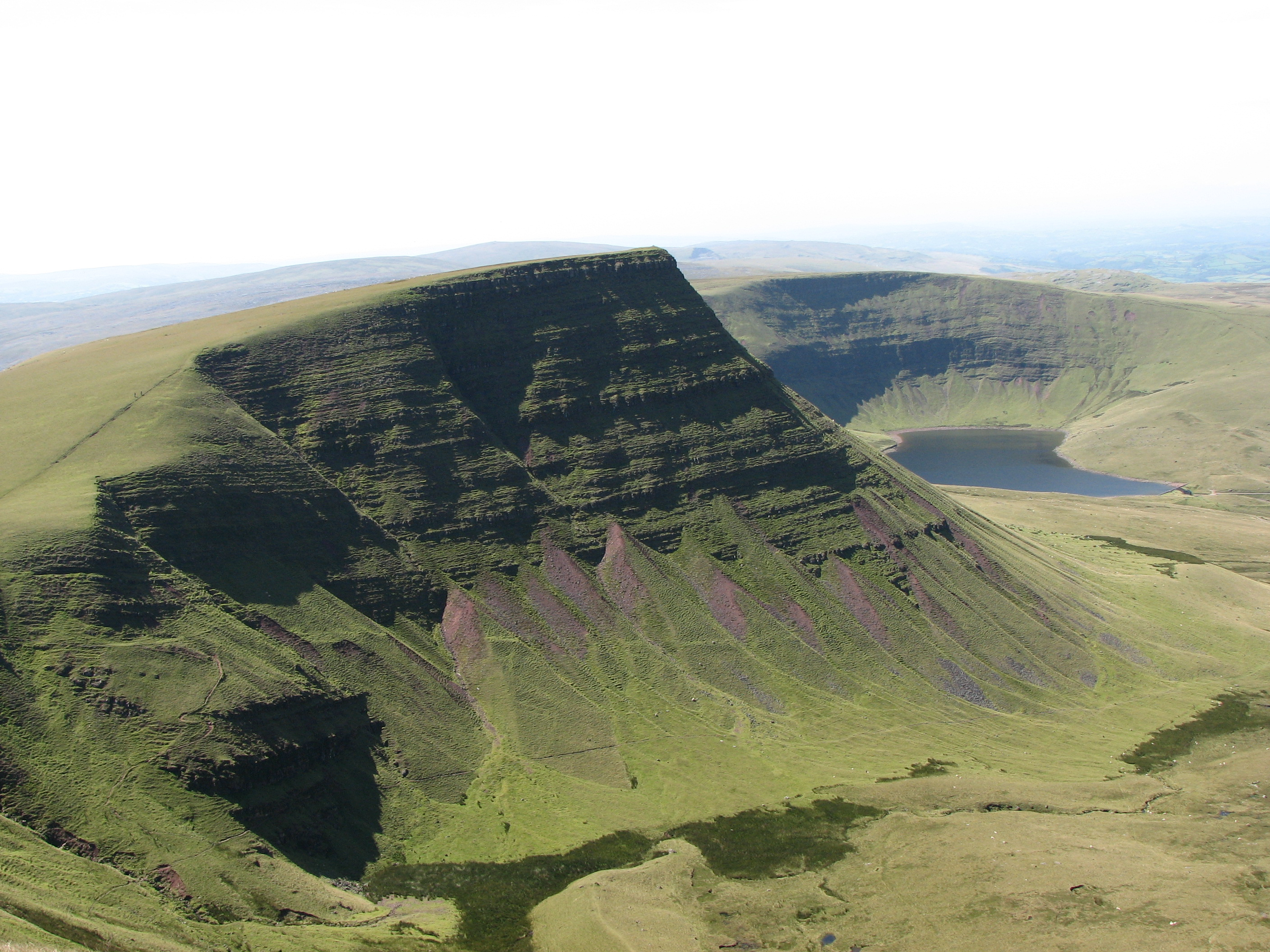
Picws Du with Llyn y Fan Fach in the background

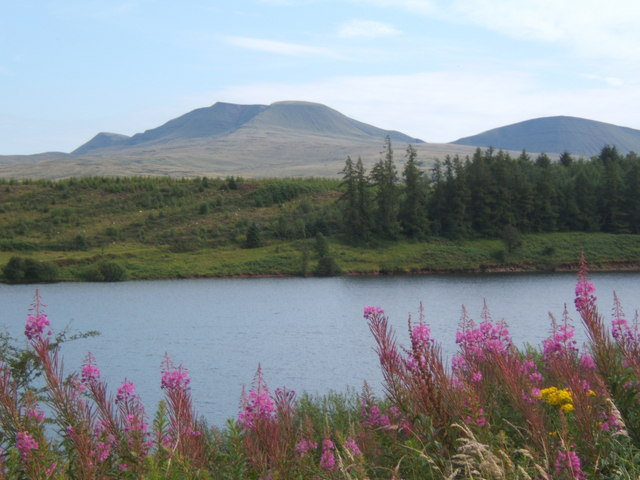
The Black Mountain range seen from the Usk Reservoir

The massif is drained by a number of rivers which flow down the southern dip-slopes of the massif from its main ridge. In contrast the northerly directed streams tend to be shorter and steeper. The larger parts of the range are moorland and include areas of peat bog. The rivers Usk and Tawe have their sources on the northern and eastern flanks of the range whilst the smaller Loughor arises at the western end of the range. Significant right bank tributaries of the Tawe such as the River Giedd and the Afon Twrch, as well as the River Amman, a tributary of the Loughor, are the principal southerly-directed watercourses. Two left-bank tributaries of the River Towy, the River Cennen and the Afon Sawdde, drain the northwestern slopes of the Black Mountain.

The range is noted for its two glacial lakes which sit directly below the main escarpment, being much larger than the small lake of similar origin which occurs below Pen y Fan.

=== Llyn y Fan Fach ===
Llyn y Fan Fach ('little lake of the peak') is the smaller and more westerly of two natural lakes within the Black Mountain. It is enclosed within a rock hollow formed as a result of glacial action during the ice ages. It is about 500 yards long and 200 yards wide, and roughly oriented east–west. It is drained by the Afon Sawdde which cuts through a glacial moraine which in part forms a natural dam. A small artificial dam was constructed in the 1930s to divert some of its waters to boost Llanelli's water supply. Llyn y Fan Fach is associated with the Lady of the Lake legend. The lake can easily be reached on foot from the car park on the Welsh Water access road near Llanddeusant.

=== Llyn y Fan Fawr ===
Llyn y Fan Fawr ('large lake of the peak') lies below Fan Brycheiniog towards the eastern end of the massif. It is of similar glacial origin to its westerly neighbour, but slightly larger. It is about 600 yards long and 200 yards wide, being roughly oriented north south. The lake is drained by a stream known as Nant y Llyn ('stream of the lake'), whose waters flow into the River Tawe. The surface of Llyn y Fan Fawr lies at about 1980 feet or 605 m above sea level. The lake can be reached on foot by either of two 1.7 mile (2.7 km) paths across the moor from informal roadside parking off the minor Trecastle to Abercraf road.

== Access ==
Parts of the massif are over 3 miles (5 km) from the nearest public road. Some are minor single track roads with passing places. There are several small parking areas on the minor roads crossing the range, and a larger car park at the end of the minor road from Llanddeusant village to the start of the access track to Llyn y Fan Fach. Virtually the entire massif consists of land mapped as open country and hence legally accessible to the public on foot under the provisions of the Countryside and Rights of Way Act 2000. In addition the range is crossed from north to south by a number of long bridleways which may be used by mountain bikers and horseriders though long sections of them are very rough and indistinct. The Beacons Way traverses the range roughly from east to west. Increased use of certain sections of path by walkers in recent years has resulted in accelerated erosion, a problem exacerbated by the sometimes thin, gravelly soils and the high rainfall, and has prompted repairs by the Brecon Beacons National Park Authority. There are numerous peat bogs on the high and middle ground, although some are bridged by stone pavements. There is a well graded stone staircase which carries the Beacons Way path from Llyn y Fan Fawr up the escarpment to Fan Brycheiniog in the centre of the range.

== Wildlife ==
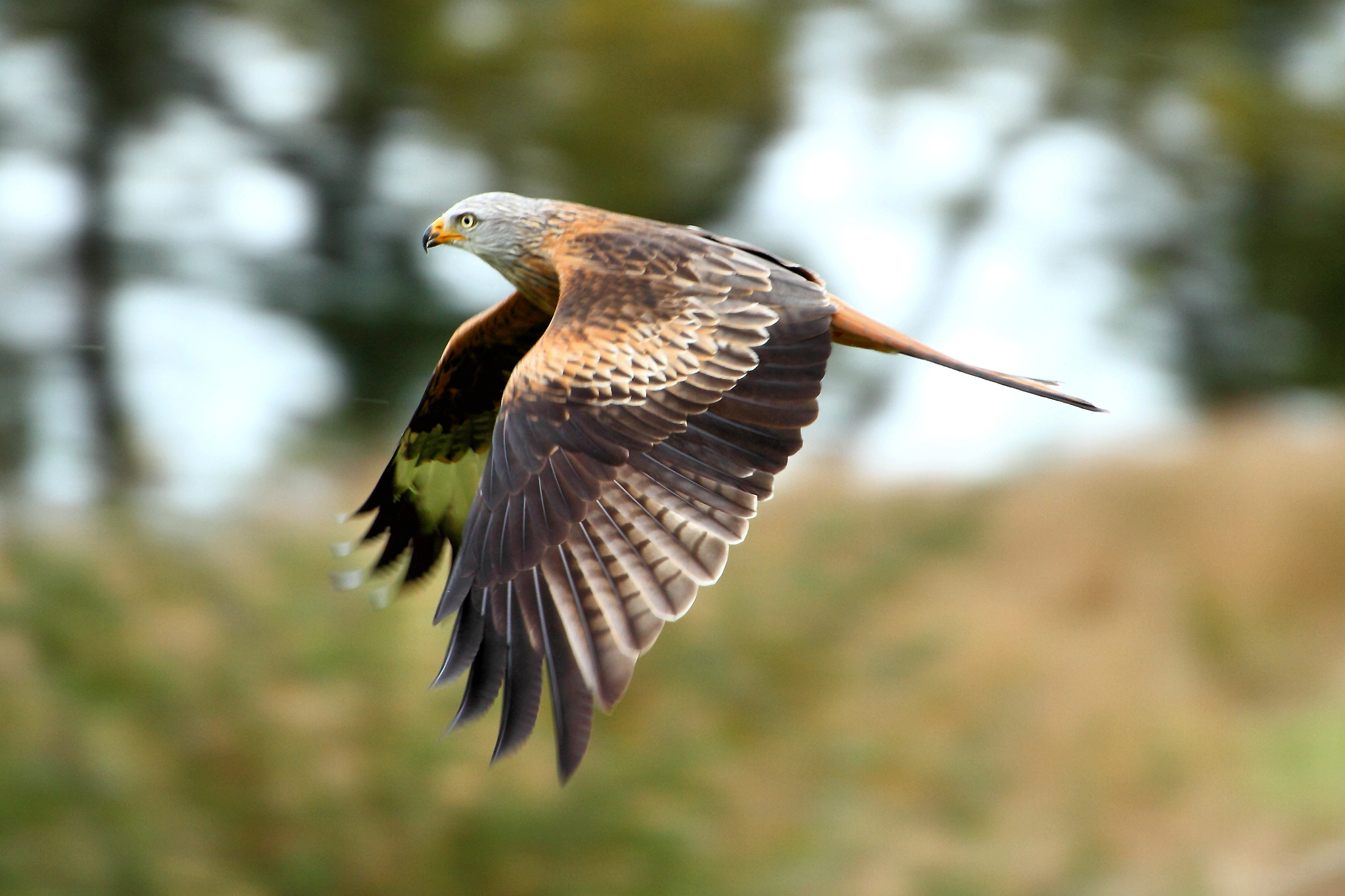
Side view of adult red kite, Wales

There are numerous different species of bird in the area, and they include the red kite, common buzzard, kestrel, carrion crow, common raven and skylark to name a few of the most obvious residents. The red kite was previously restricted to this and adjoining areas in South Wales such as Mynydd Mallaen owing to persecution by gamekeepers in the rest of the country, but has since been introduced widely in southern Britain, such as the Chilterns. The kestrel and buzzard are widely distributed, but the raven is restricted to the higher mountains. There is a wide distribution of mammals such as field voles, red foxes and badgers as well as many songbirds. The skylark is plentiful due to the extensive rough pasture present below the main peaks which allows ground nesting of the species. Pied wagtails are common near the streams and torrents running from the hill tops.

== Cultural associations ==
The Black Mountain is generally considered to be one of the wildest regions of Wales and is associated with numerous myths such as the Arthurian legend of the Lady of the Lake and Twrch Trwyth. More recent events are commemorated in prose and verse, e.g. 'From the Mist to Heaven' written after a tragedy played out on these moors in May 1904. Cribarth on its southeastern margin is sometimes known locally as the Sleeping Giant, after the appearance of its profile from Cwm Tawe to the south.
