= Gwaun-Cae-Gurwen =

Village and community in Neath Port Talbot, Wales

Gwaun-Cae-Gurwen: Welsh: Gwauncaegurwen
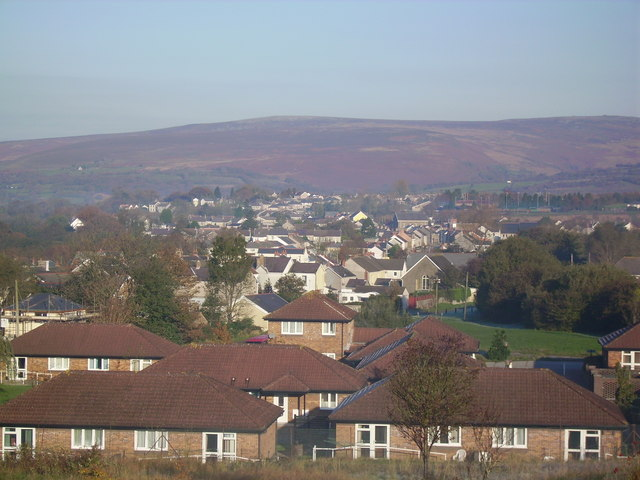

- Location within Neath Port Talbot
- Population: 4,240 (2011)
- OS grid reference: SN705115
- Principal area: Neath Port Talbot
- Preserved county: West Glamorgan
- Country: Wales
- Sovereign state: United Kingdom
- Post town: AMMANFORD
- Postcode district: SA18
- Dialling code: 01269
- Police: South Wales
- Fire: Mid and West Wales
- Ambulance: Welsh
- UK Parliament: Brecon, Radnor and Cwm Tawe,
- Senedd Cymru – Welsh Parliament: Neath
- List of places UK Wales Neath Port Talbot 51.787125°N 3.878898°W Map of the community

Gwaun-Cae-Gurwen (Welsh: Gwauncaegurwen) is a village and community in the county borough of Neath Port Talbot. In South West Wales, it was historically a part of Glamorgan and is in the most Welsh-speaking part of Neath Port Talbot. The community is made up of the electoral wards of Gwaun-Cae-Gurwen and Lower Brynamman. The name stems from the Original Gwaun (meaning meadow), Cegir (flower) and Gwen (welsh for white), as before settlement, the land was rich with white meadow flowers.

== Location ==
Gwaun-Cae-Gurwen is located five miles east of the nearest town of Ammanford and nearly fifteen miles north of Swansea. Nearby villages include Cwmgors, Lower Brynaman & Tairgwaith.

== Etymology ==
The name Gwaun-Cae-Gurwen is believed to be an alteration of what was originally gwaun cegerwen (i.e. "white hemlock heath" in Welsh, ceger being a dialect form of cegid). In local usage, the name is often shortened to "Y Waun", meaning "the heath" in Welsh.

== History ==
Gwaun-cae-Gurwen was a mining village in the west Wales anthracite district. There were six or seven pits in the early 1920s.

== Schools ==
Ysgol Gynradd Gymraeg Gwauncaegurwen (Gwaun-cae-Gurwen Welsh Primary School) used to be on Heol y Dŵr (Water Street) which is where the Pwll y Wrach estate is based. It has since been moved to Heol Newydd (New Road), overlooking the village, and the former school transformed into a wood workshop.

Secondary-age children in the area have the choice of going to Ysgol Gyfun Ystalyfera in Ystalyfera (for full Welsh-medium education), Ysgol Dyffryn Aman (for Welsh- and English-medium education), or Cwmtawe Community School (for English-medium education).

== Welsh language ==
The Welsh Language Board reported in 2009 that 67.9% of the population of Gwaun-Cae-Gurwen can speak, read or write in Welsh. 10–19 year olds were the group with the highest percentage of Welsh speakers.

== Representation ==
The area is represented in the House of Commons by David Chadwick, representing Brecon, Radnor and Cwm Tawe; and in the Senedd by Jeremy Miles, representing the Neath constituency.

The electoral ward of Gwaun-Cae-Gurwen had a population of 2,910 at the 2011 census.

== Sport ==
Cwmgors RFC play their home games at Parc-y-werin, Gwaun-Cae-Gurwen. Their clubhouse is also situated at New Road, Gwaun-Cae-Gurwen.

== Notable natives ==
- Sir Gareth Edwards, former Wales and British and Irish Lions player; a street, Maes Gareth Edwards, is named after him
- Barry Morgan, Archbishop of Wales and Bishop of Llandaff
- Dame Siân Phillips, actress
- Gwenda Thomas, former member of the Senedd and Deputy Minister in the Welsh Government

== Pwll-y-Wrach ==
At one time, almost all of the land of The Waun was owned by the Jones Family who also owned the "Pwll-y-Wrach Estate". It was run by the Head and later by their sons (and spouses). They still own parts of the land of the village but most has been sold off. Both farmhouses connected to the Estate are still standing. They are: Pwll-y-Wrach and Glangwrach. Pwll-y-Wrach is the main house where the head of the family lived.

It is no longer a farming estate but continues to own much of the land in the village. The name means the Witch's Pool in English, because of an old Welsh myth that the witches lived in it because of the greeny-blue colour and would sometimes come out to haunt the locals.
