= Iestyn Rees =

Welsh rugby union player (born 1999)

- Born: 5 October 1999 (age 27) Paderborn, Germany
- Height: 189 cm (6 ft 2 in)
- Weight: 109 kg (17 st 2 lb)
- School: Ysgol Bro Dinefwr
- University: Swansea University

Rugby union career
- Position: Flanker
Youth career
- Llandeilo RFC
Senior career
Years	Team	Apps	(Points)
2018–2023	Llandovery RFC	32	(5)
2021–2023	Scarlets	6	(5)
2023–2024	Ampthill	12	(0)
2024–2025	Cambridge	16	(10)
2025–	Nottingham		
International career
Years	Team	Apps	(Points)
2019	Wales U20s	9	(0)
2026–	Germany	1	(0)
- Correct as of 23 February 2026
National sevens team
Years	Team		Comps
2022	Wales 7's		1
- Correct as of 21 October 2022

Iestyn Rees (born 5 October 1999) is a Welsh rugby union player, who previously played for Scarlets and Ampthill as a flanker.

== Club career ==
=== Scarlets ===
Rees attended Ysgol Bro Dinefwr, and came through the ranks of Llandeilo RFC. Rees was named in the Scarlets first team squad ahead of the 2020–21 season. Originally named to make a possible debut off the bench along with fellow academy product Kemsley Mathias in the EPCR Challenge Cup match against Toulon on 18 December 2020, Rees was forced to wait, as the match was called off due to COVID-19 cases. He finally made his Scarlets debut in Round 1 of the Pro14 Rainbow Cup against the Dragons, scoring a try. He made two further appearances during the tournament, coming off the bench against Cardiff and Edinburgh. Rees signed a new contract with the Scarlets in May 2021.

Rees featured in a Scarlets Development XV friendly match against Ospreys A on 19 November 2021, starting as an openside flanker. His involvement with the Scarlets was limited after this, not appearing again until 10 March 2023, when he started in a friendly against the Saracens. Rees played for affiliated-side Llandovery RFC, when not playing for the Scarlets.

=== Post-Scarlets career ===
On 21 April 2023, it was announced that Rees would depart the Scarlets at the end of the season. He made a final appearance for the Scarlets, his first European match, against Glasgow on 29 April 2023.

Rees joined Ampthill for the 2023–24 season.

After one season with Ampthill, Rees joined Cambridge.

Ahead of the 2025–26 Champ Rugby season, Rees joined Nottingham.

== International career ==
=== Wales age grade and sevens ===
In 2018, Rees was selected as captain of Wales U18.

Rees represented Wales U20 in the U20 Six Nations and World Rugby Under 20 Championship.

In 2022, Rees competed for Wales Sevens at the 2022 Rugby World Cup Sevens in Cape Town.

=== Germany ===
Having been born in Germany, Rees qualified for Germany national rugby union team after the requisite stand-down period following on from playing sevens for Wales, and was selected for the 2026 Rugby Europe Championship.

He made his debut for Germany national rugby union team against Belgium national rugby union team on Saturday 21 February 2026, playing in the second row.
