= John Davies (Methodist minister, born 1823) =

Welsh Independent minister (1823–1874)

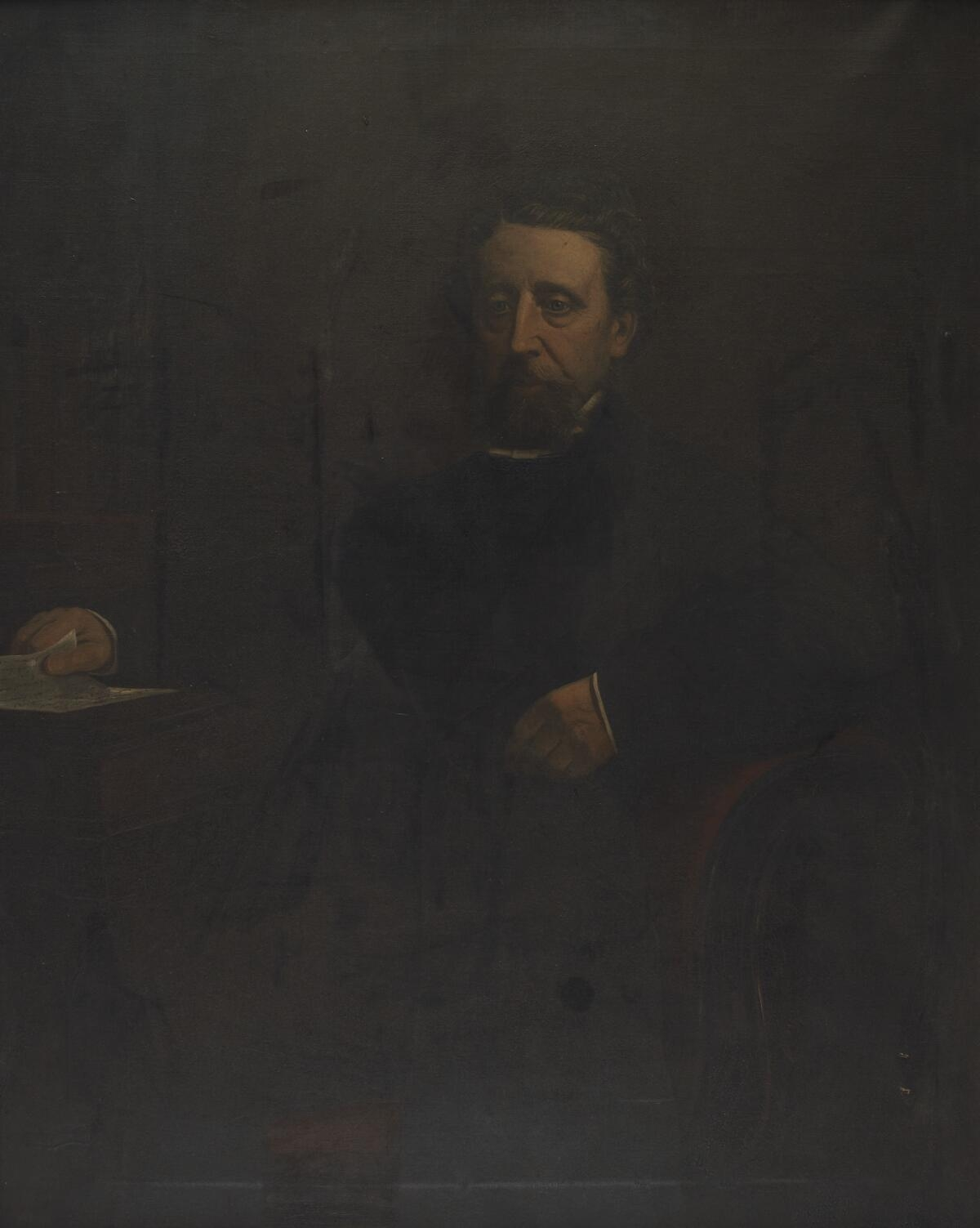
Reverend John Davies, Cardiff, 1823-1874

John Davies (1823–1874) was a Welsh Methodist minister.

== Biography ==
He was born in Llandovery, and as a young boy attended a school in Myddfai for a while before moving to attend classes at Hanover School, near Abergavenny. In 1842, he began a period of study at Brecon College, following which, as an ordained minister, he held appointments at; Llanelly, Brecknock (1846), Aberaman (1854), Mount Stuart, Cardiff (1863), and Hannah Street, Cardiff (1868–74).

His written works include a booklet (to counteract the influence of the Mormons in Wales), 'Y Doniau Gwyrthiol' (1851). He was an editor of 'Y Beirniad', and also participated in the establishment of 'Yr Adolygydd' (1850).

He died in May 1874, and was buried in Cardiff cemetery.
