= Ysgol Tre-Gib =

Former school in Llandeilo, Wales

Coordinates: 51.8755°N 3.9872°W

Ysgol Tre-Gib was a bilingual, English language / Welsh language comprehensive school for pupils aged 11 yrs to 18 years based in Ffairfach, Llandeilo in Carmarthenshire, Wales, bordering on the Brecon Beacons National Park.

The school served a large catchment area from Llandovery to the north to Ammanford to the south.

Some famous rugby union players attended this school, including Luke Charteris, who later played for Bath.

Plans were afoot to merge Ysgol Tre-Gib with Llandovery's Ysgol Pantycelyn, with the new school being called Ysgol Dyffryn Tywi. However, there was opposition to the closure of Llandovery's main school. The new school is called Ysgol Bro Dinefwr, and all pupils moved to the new campus in September 2016.

== See also ==
- Category:People educated at Ysgol Tre-Gib
