= St Michael's Church, Myddfai =

Coordinates: 51°57′21″N 3°47′12″W

St Michael's Church
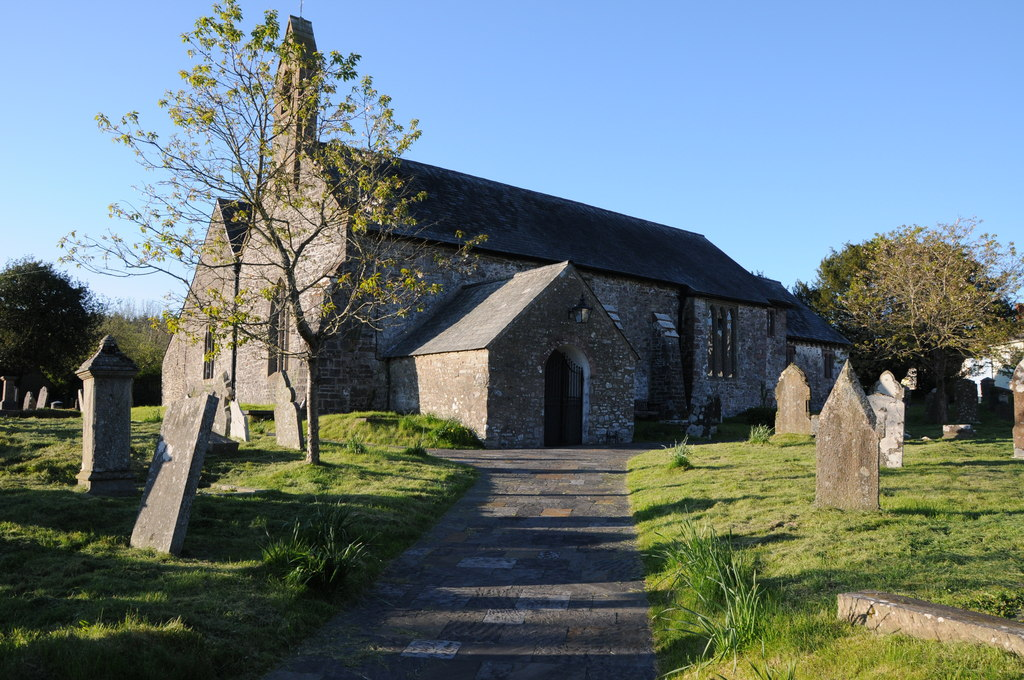
- St Michael's Church
- Location: Myddfai, Carmarthenshire
- Country: Wales
- Denomination: Church in Wales

History
- Founded: Medieval

Architecture
- Heritage designation: Grade I
- Designated: 7 August 1966
- Architectural type: Church

St Michael's Church is the Anglican parish church for the parish of Myddfai, south of Llandovery, in Carmarthenshire, Wales. The present building dates from the 14th and 15th centuries with restoration work being undertaken in 1874, when a bellcote was added, and again in 1926.

The church has a double nave and twin parallel roofs. The south nave may be the oldest part of the church and dates to the fifteenth century. The interior of the church has original plaster-panelled roofs with moulded timber ribs throughout the building.

The church was designated as Grade I-listed building on 7 August 1966, as a fine example of "a largely complete medieval church of a scale and detail unexpected in so rural a location. Unusually intact interior including arcades, complete surviving late medieval roofs and the extensive survival of late medieval window tracery. The double nave form is relatively rare in the county, being more common in Powys".
