= Rhys Prichard =

Welsh writer (1579–1644)

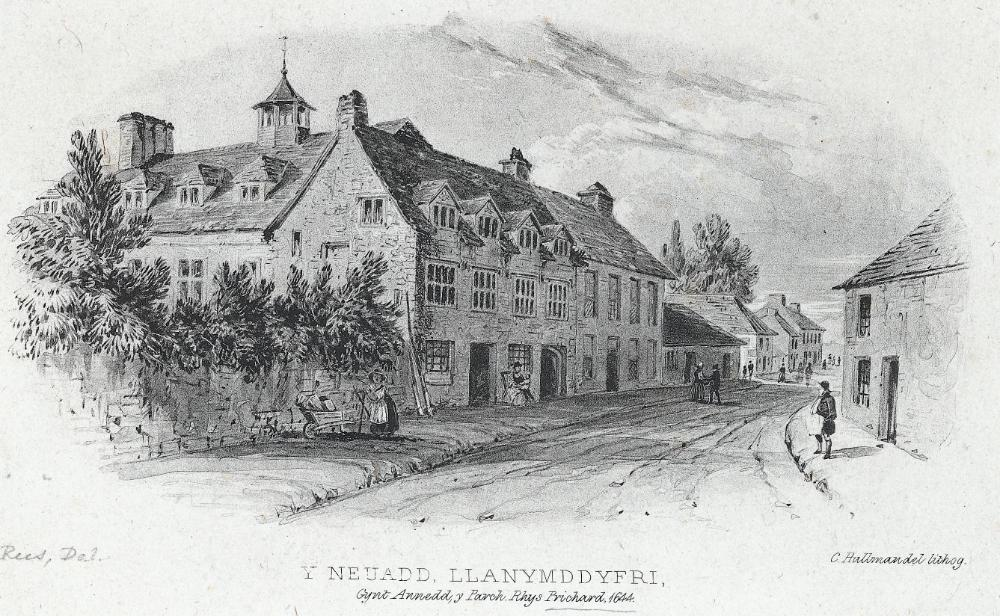
Y Neuadd, Llanymddyfri, the home of Rhys Prichard

Rhys Prichard (1579–1644) was a Welsh clergyman and poet. He was vicar of Llandovery in the west of Wales and held various posts at St David's Cathedral (being made chancellor of St David's in 1626, and later canon). He was known as "Yr Hen Ficer" ("the Old Vicar").

Prichard was born in Llandovery, possibly in the house at 33 High Street which was owned by his parents at the time. When he became vicar, Prichard was a habitual drunkard, but underwent a conversion experience while there.

Prichard, who was educated at Jesus College, Oxford, composed many poems on religious themes. His greatest fame lies with his influential poem Cannwyll y Cymry (usually translated as The Welshman's Candle), a collection of poetical teachings and moral guidance.

Later in his life Prichard built a larger house on the same plot of land where his birthplace had originally stood, and this house was demolished in the mid-20th century.
