= William Williams Pantycelyn =

Welsh hymnist, poet and prose writer (1717–1791)

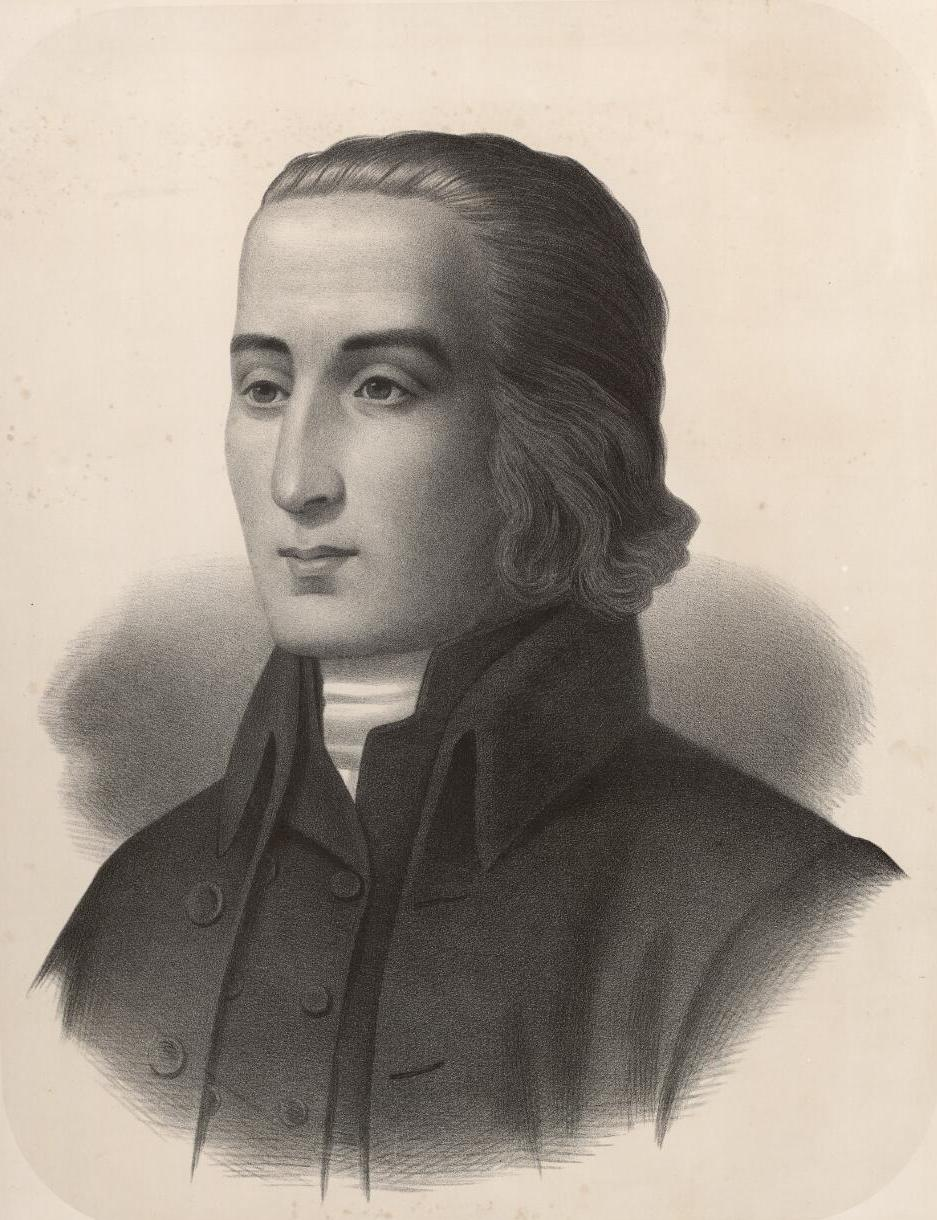
- Born: 11 February 1717 Llanfair-ar-y-bryn, Wales
- Died: 11 January 1791 (aged 73) Pantycelyn, Wales
- Genre: hymns poetry
- Notable works: "Arglwydd, arwain trwy'r anialwch"

Religious life
- Denomination: Welsh Methodist

William Williams, Pantycelyn (c. 11 February 1717 – 11 January 1791), also known as William Williams, Williams Pantycelyn or simply Pantycelyn, was generally seen as Wales's premier hymnist. He is also rated among the great literary figures of Wales, as a writer of poetry and prose. In religion he was among the leaders of the 18th-century Welsh Methodist revival, along with the evangelists Howell Harris and Daniel Rowland.

== Life ==
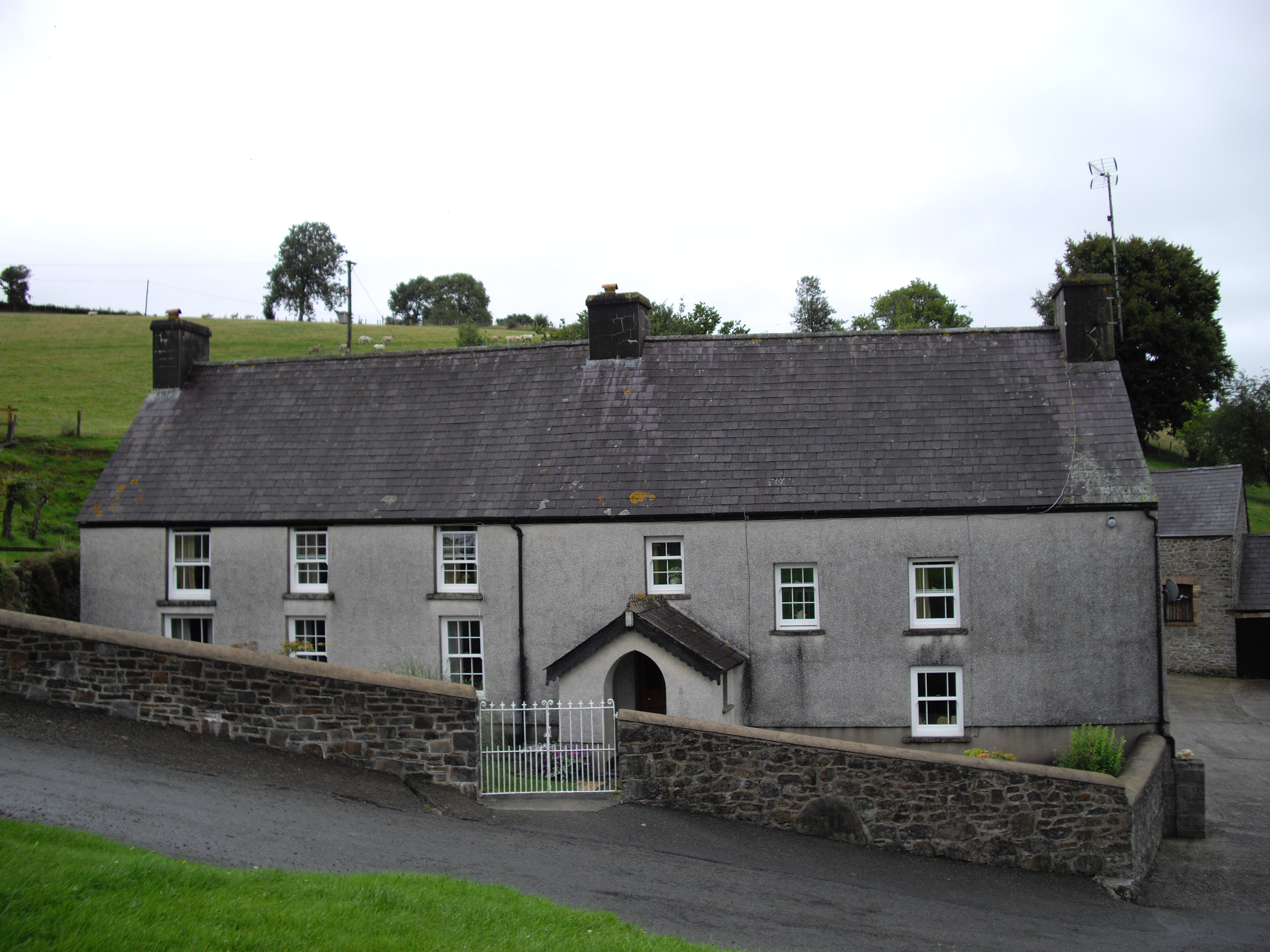
Pantycelyn farmhouse

Williams was born in 1717 at Cefn-coed farm in the parish of Llanfair-ar-y-bryn near Llandovery in Carmarthenshire, the son of John and Dorothy Williams. John died in 1742 and Dorothy later moved to the nearby farm of Pantycelyn ("Holly Hollow"). William Williams himself is often referred to as Pantycelyn.

The family were Nonconformists. He was educated locally and then at a nonconformist academy near Talgarth. He had intended to study medicine, but this changed in 1737–1738, when he was converted by the preaching of the evangelical Methodist revivalist Howell Harris in Talgarth.

For much of his life, Williams lived in the parish of Llanfair-ar-y-bryn. He died at Pantycelyn in January 1791 at the age of 74 and is buried in Llanfair-ar-y-bryn churchyard. He is also commemorated by a memorial chapel in Llandovery.

== Religious figure ==
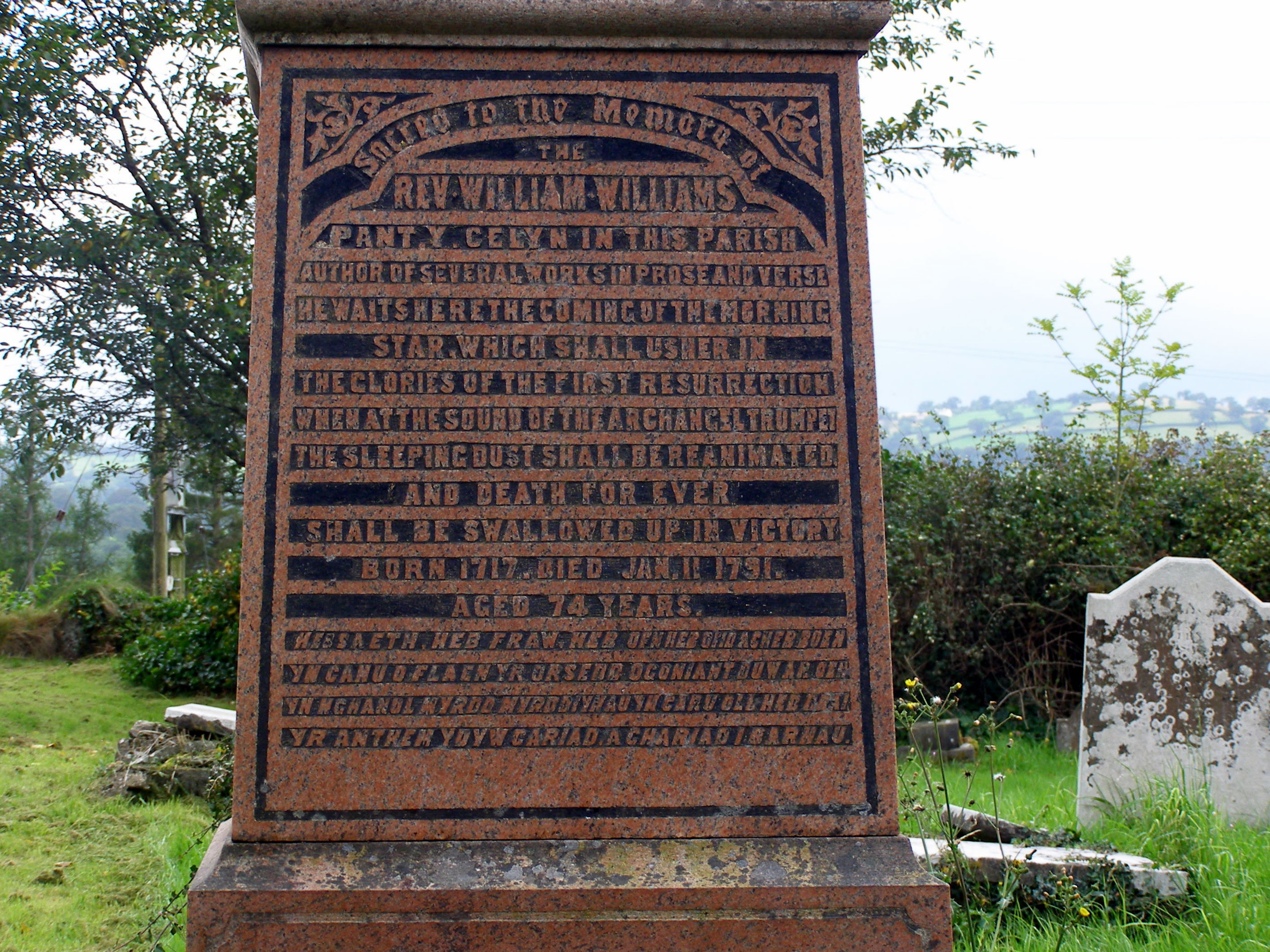
Gravestone of William Williams

William Williams felt called to the priesthood; and in 1740, despite his family's links with the Nonconformist branch of Christianity, he took deacon's orders in the Established Anglican Church. (Since disestablishment in 1920, the Anglican church in Wales has been known as the Church in Wales.)

His first appointment was as curate to Theophilus Evans (1693–1767) in the parishes of Llanwrtyd, Llanfihangel Abergwesyn and Llanddewi Abergwesyn. Around this time he became involved in the Methodist movement and in June 1742 his disapproving parishioners reported his activities to the Archdeacon's Court in Brecon. Methodism was originally a reformist faction within the Church of England and was not intended to be a separatist movement or church. It was nevertheless seen as a threat to the Anglican establishment, and in 1743, when Williams duly applied for ordination as a priest, his application was refused because of his Methodist connection. Rather than a comfortable, conformist career in the Anglican Church, he chose a financially precarious, but perhaps spiritually richer life as a Methodist preacher.

The key years in the foundation of English Methodism were between 1739, when the brothers Charles and John Wesley, both Anglican priests, broke with the Moravian church and set up their own first chapel in Bristol, and 1743, when they drew up their General Rules. This was, unfortunately, the very time that Williams was beginning his own career in the Church and partly explains the hostility he experienced from his congregation and from the hierarchy. Williams paid a higher price for his beliefs than did the Wesleys. Williams was shut out of the Establishment at the start of his career, whilst the Wesleys had already been ordained.

Welsh Methodism predates 1739 and can be traced back to the conversions of the two main leaders of the Welsh Methodists, Howell Harris and Daniel Rowland, in 1735. It was an indigenous, parallel movement to its sister movement in England, and the Welsh Methodists were mainly Calvinists, who worked much more closely with George Whitefield than they did with John Wesley.

Charles Wesley declared that his own Methodism was not incompatible with his Anglicanism and he was buried as an Anglican. John Wesley's doctrine was more favourable to Arminianism than to Calvinism. In Wales, however, most Methodists followed Calvinist teaching, and this led to great tensions between the Welsh Calvinistic Methodists and the Wesleyan Methodists, especially after the Wesleyan Methodists began actively evangelising in Welsh-speaking Wales from 1800 onwards. In 1811, the Welsh Calvinist Methodists, now usually called the Presbyterian Church of Wales, seceded from the Anglican Church and ordained their own ministers. Had he lived a little longer, Williams Pantycelyn would no doubt have approved of these moves, because as a Methodist, he himself became a firm advocate of Calvinist Reformation doctrine and frequently invoked stern warnings against Arminianism, Arianism, Socinianism, Sandemanianism and other teachings. [See: G. T. Hughes: p. 7].

Williams Pantycelyn travelled throughout Wales (he is said to have partly supported his ministry by selling tea) preaching the doctrine of Calvinistic Methodism. He needed to be not only a theologian and an advocate for the new Connexion, but also an organiser and administrator. His converts gathered in seiadau (fellowship meetings). Williams had to organise, and then maintain, these seiadau as he went around the country. Each successful visit to a new locality in turn required a new seiat. Although he was not alone in his mission, the workload and mental burden must have been considerable. By the same token, it must have been deeply rewarding to see the community grow and thrive over the years and to reflect on the alternative life he had forsaken, as the priest of some obscure rural Anglican parish in mid-Wales.

Together with Harris and Rowland, William Williams "Pantycelyn" is acknowledged as a leader of the Methodist Revival in Wales in the 18th century and as the "literary voice" par excellence of that movement.

== Literary figure ==
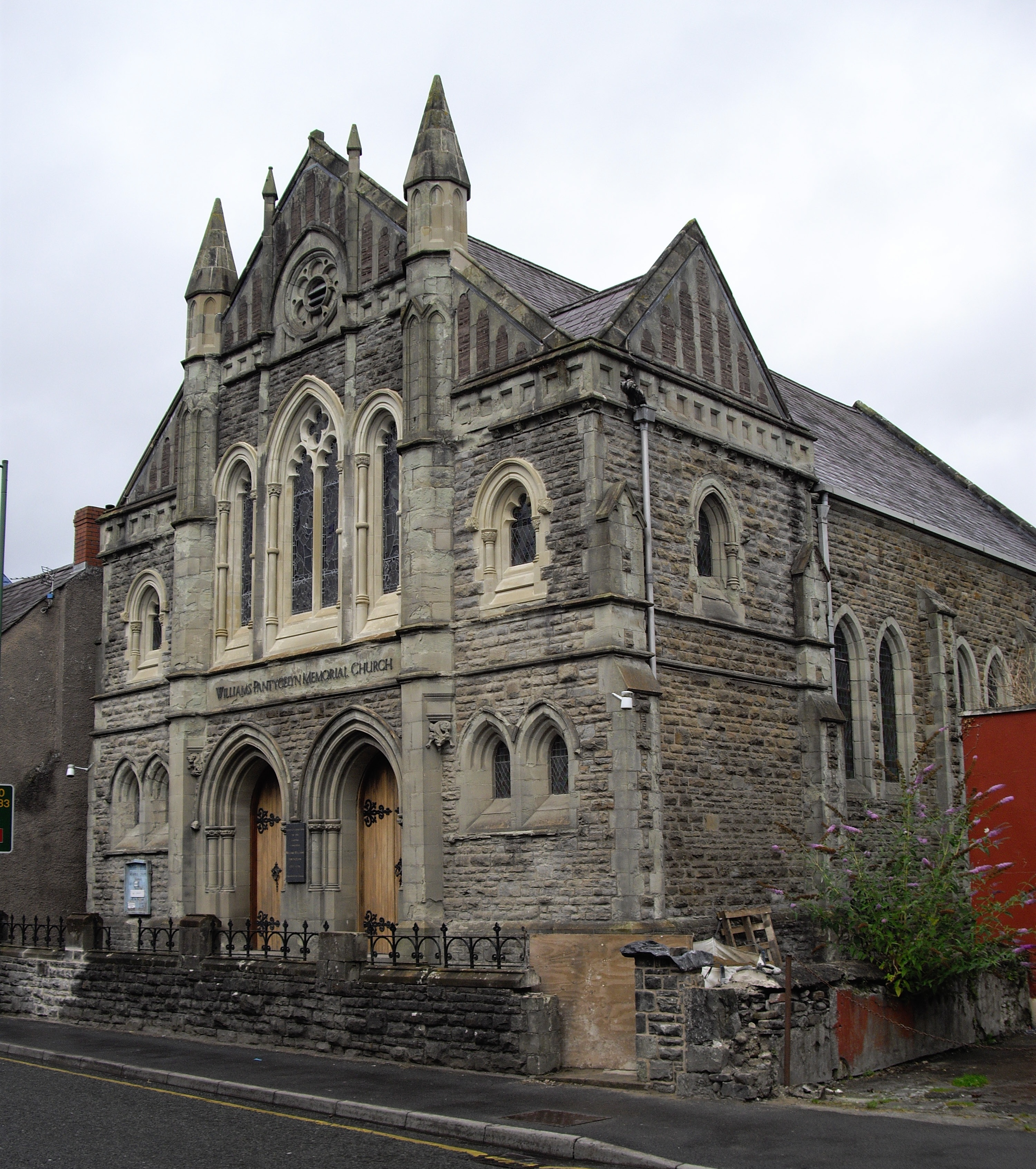
Williams Pantycelyn Memorial Chapel (Presbyterian Church of Wales), Llandovery

William Williams Pantycelyn was not merely an important figure in the religious life in Wales, he was also one of the most important influences on Welsh language culture, not just in his own lifetime, but on into the 19th and 20th centuries. He is particularly known as a hymn writer and his ability earned him the accolade y pêr ganiedydd ('The Sweet Songster'), echoing the description of King David as "the sweet psalmist of Israel" (2 Samuel 23:1).

His literary output has been analysed in Saunders Lewis's book Williams Pantycelyn (1927).

=== Hymns ===
He wrote some of his work in English, but the great majority in his native Welsh. He published his first work in 1744: this was the first part of Aleluia, a collection of hymns in Welsh. It was followed by further collections:

- 1751: Hosanna i Fab Dafydd (Hosannah to the Son of David).
- 1759: Rhai hymnau a chaniadau duwiol (Some hymns and divine songs).
- 1762: Caniadau y rhai sydd ar y môr o wydr (The songs of those on the crystal sea).
- 1763: Ffarwel weledig, groesaw anweledig bethau (Farewell seen, and welcome unseen things).
- 1771: Gloria in excelsis.
- 1774: Ychydig hymnau (A few hymns).
- 1782: Rhai hymnau newyddion (Some new hymns).

He also published two collections of English hymns:

- 1759: Hosannah to the son of David.
- 1772: Gloria in excelsis.

Undoubtedly his best known hymn is "Arglwydd, arwain trwy'r anialwch" (in English, "Lord, lead thou through the wilderness"). This was soon translated into English by Peter Williams: "Guide Me, O Thou Great Jehovah" or "Guide Me, O Thou Great Redeemer". It is usually sung to the tune Cwm Rhondda by John Hughes. His missionary hymn in English, O'er the Gloomy Hills of Darkness (1772), went on to call dissension in the pro-slavery churches of the southern United States.

=== Poetry ===
His hymns were not his only major contribution to the success of Calvinistic Methodism. He wrote two long poems on theological and religious themes:

- 1756: Golwg ar deyrnas Crist (A view of Christ's kingdom). The history of salvation and God's grace in Christ.
- 1764: Bywyd a marwolaeth Theomemphus (Life and death of Theomemphus). The religious experience of conversion and Christian living.

He also wrote a series of elegies in memory of various Methodist and other Christian leaders, including: Griffith Jones of Llanddowror, Howel Davies (the Pembrokeshire preacher), George Whitefield, and Daniel Rowland.

=== Prose works ===
Williams wrote original prose works and also translated others from English. Most were intended to assist the members of the Methodist fellowships he established.

He wrote about the 1762 Revival:

- 1762: Llythyr Martha Philopur at y Parchedig Philo Evangelius eu hathro (Martha Philopur's letter to the Reverend Philo Evangelius her teacher), followed by:
- 1763: Atteb Philo-Evangelius i Martha Philopur (Philo-Evangelius's reply to Martha Philopur).

These works were intended to defend and teach the significance of the 1762 revival at Llangeitho. The 1762 revival was a powerful one, which manifested its power physically. As a result, Methodists in Wales were often known as Jumpers.

- 1762 to 1779: Pantheologia, Neu Hanes Holl Grefyddau'r Byd (Pantheologia, or a History of all the World's Religions).
- 1767: Crocodil Afon yr Aifft (Crocodile of the River of Egypt).
- 1768: Hanes Bywyd a Marwolaeth Tri Wyr o Sodom a'r Aifft (A history of the life and death of three men of Sodom and Egypt).
- 1774: Aurora Borealis: neu, Y Goleuni yn y Gogledd (Aurora Borealis: The Northern Lights).

He wrote practical guides for a Christian life:

- 1777: Doctor Nuptarum neu gyfarwyddwr priodas (Teacher of the Nuptials or the marriage guide), and:
- 1777: Drws y society profiad (A gateway to the experience meeting).

These were for the converts who were members of the seiadau or societies.

== See also ==
- Divergence between Anglicanism and Methodism

== Sources ==
- Glyn Tegai Hughes (1983), Williams Pantycelyn. Writers of Wales series. Cardiff : University of Wales Press on behalf of the Welsh Arts Council ISBN 9780708308400
- Gomer Morgan Roberts (1949, 1958), Y pêr ganiedydd : Pantycelyn. 2 vols. Aberystwyth: Gwasg Aberystwyth
- "William Williams, (1717–1791)". In: Meic Stephens, ed. (1998), The New Companion to the Literature of Wales. Cardiff: University of Wales Press. ISBN 0-7083-1383-3
- E. Wyn James, "The Evolution of the Welsh Hymn". In: Dissenting Praise, ed. I. Rivers & D. L. Wykes (OUP, 2011)
- E. Wyn James, "'Blessèd Jubil!': Slavery, Mission and the Millennial Dawn in the Work of William Williams of Pantycelyn". In: Cultures of Radicalism in Britain and Ireland, ed. John Kirk, Michael Brown and Andrew Noble (London: Pickering & Chatto, 2013), pp. 951–12 and 1942–02. ISBN 978-1-84893-344-6
- E. Wyn James, "The Longing and the Legacy: Liturgy and Life in the Hymns of William Williams of Pantycelyn", The Bulletin of the Hymn Society of Great Britain and Ireland, No. 286, Vol. 21:5 (Winter 2016), pp. 163–78 (also in The Carmarthenshire Antiquary, vol. 55, 2019)
- Eifion Evans, Bread of Heaven: The Life and Work of William Williams, Pantycelyn (Bridgend: Bryntirion Press, 2010)
- Parish of the Buzzards, Bidgood. Birmingham: Gold Leaf Publishing (2000)
- H. A. Hodges (ed. E. Wyn James), Flame in the Mountains: Williams Pantycelyn, Ann Griffiths and the Welsh Hymn (Tal-y-bont: Y Lolfa, 2017), 320 pp. ISBN 978-1-78461-454-6
- Derec Llwyd Morgan, The Great Awakening in Wales (London, 1988)
- E. Wyn James, "Popular Poetry, Methodism, and the Ascendancy of the Hymn". In: The Cambridge History of Welsh Literature, ed. Geraint Evans & Helen Fulton (Cambridge: Cambridge University Press, 2019)
- K. Jenkins, Anthem Angau Calfari: Myfyrdodau Ar Ddetholiad O Emynau Pantycelyn (Caernarfon: Pwyllgor Darlleniadau Beiblaidd Cyngor Eglwysi Cymru, 1991
