= Williams Pantycelyn Memorial Chapel, Llandovery =

Church in Carmarthenshire, Wales

Coordinates: 51°59′38″N 3°47′35″W

Williams Pantycelyn Memorial Chapel
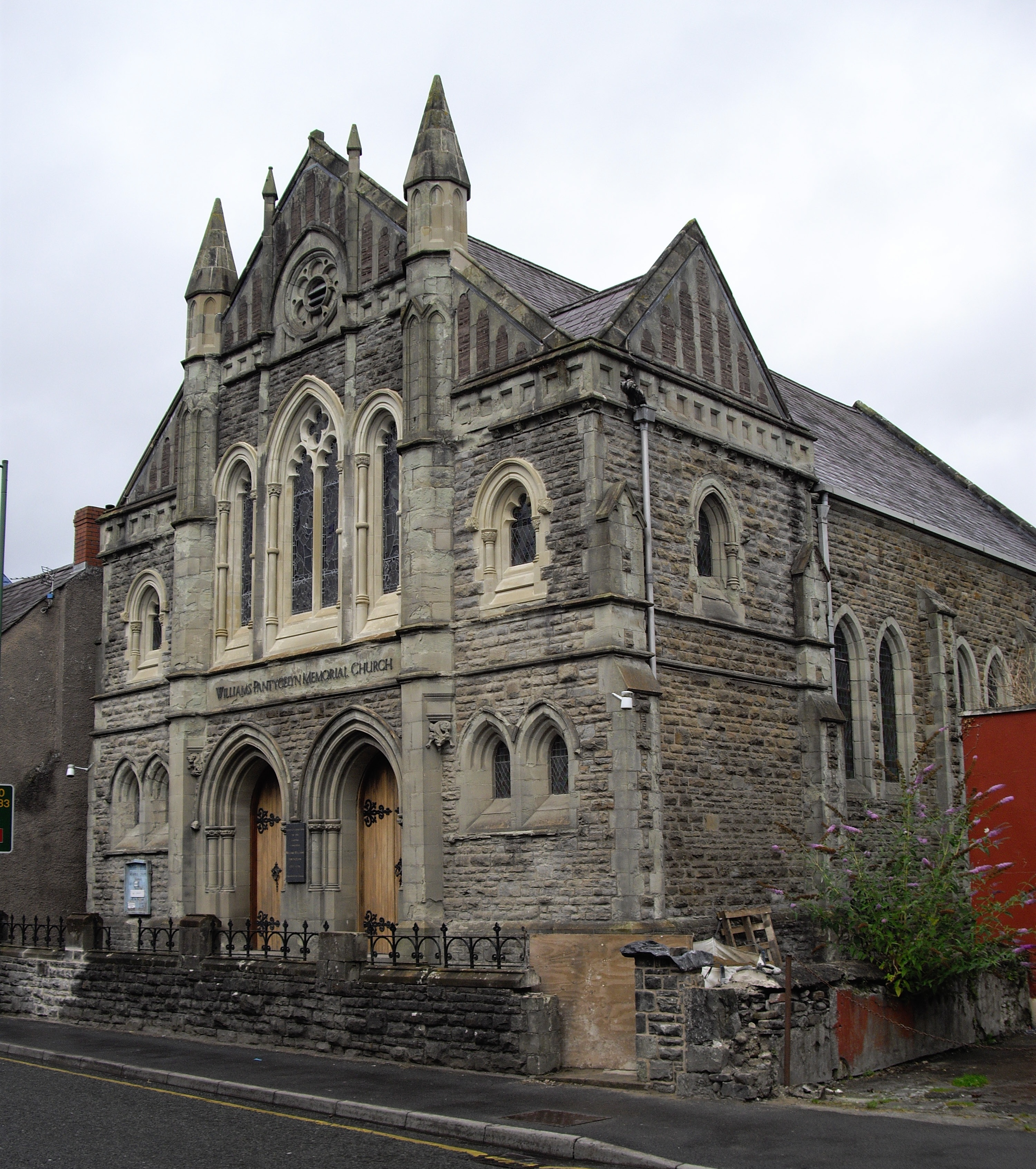
- Williams Pantycelyn Memorial Chapel
- Location: 4 Stryd y Bont, Llandovery
- Country: Wales
- Denomination: Calvinistic Methodist

History
- Founded: 1886–1888

Architecture
- Heritage designation: Grade II*
- Designated: 2 January 2000
- Architectural type: Chapel
- Style: Gothic

The Williams Pantycelyn Memorial Chapel is a Calvinistic Methodist chapel in the town of Llandovery, Carmarthenshire, Wales. The building was constructed between 1886 and 1888 and is located at 4 Stryd y Bont, Llandovery. It was built as a memorial to the Welsh hymn writer William Williams Pantycelyn.

The Williams Pantycelyn Memorial Chapel was built in 1886 to 1888 after a national appeal had raised £3000. It is built in the Gothic style from grey sandstone with dressings of green Quarella stone from Bridgend. The facade has three bays, pinnacled pilasters and windows with much tracery. The interior has a high hammer beam roof, an apse with a chancel arch. The pulpit is of Caen stone and is embellished with biblical scenes and pieces of text from Williams' work. The main window has fine stained glass depicting David, Isaiah, Miriam and Matthew, installed by Bell of Bristol in 1887.

It was designated as a Grade II*-listed building on 2 January 2000, being a fine example of "an unusually elaborate Gothic chapel designed by a leading Cardiff architect. Fine interior with remarkable amount of figurative detail, including carved pulpit and stained glass. Of historical significance as a memorial to William Williams Pantycelyn, C18 preacher and hymnist".

The Royal Commission on the Ancient and Historical Monuments of Wales curates the archaeological, architectural and historic records for this chapel. These include digital photographs, a collection of old postcards, a Victorian Society South Wales Group Tour Guide, colour slides and items from the Rosser Collection.
