= Physicians of Myddfai =

Welsh folklore physicians

The Physicians of Myddfai (Welsh: Meddygon Myddfai) were, according to local folklore, a succession of physicians who lived in the parish of Myddfai in Carmarthenshire, Wales.

The folklore places their first appearance in the 13th century, when Rhiwallon the Physician and his three sons were doctors to Rhys Gryg, prince of Deheubarth. It was said that they treated Rhys when he was wounded in battle near Carmarthen in 1234, but he died of his wounds shortly afterwards at Llandeilo. The family are supposed to have continued to follow the profession in the direct male line until 1739, when John Jones, the last of the line of physicians, died. Instructions for preparing herbal medicine attributed to the family have survived in the Red Book of Hergest, which dates from the late 14th century, and in other, more recent, Welsh manuscripts.

== Legend ==
Rhiwallon, who supposedly lived in the parish of Myddfai in Carmarthenshire in the 12th century, and his sons Cadwgan, Gruffudd and Einion, were physicians whose skill became proverbial in medieval Wales. A number of families in the Myddfai district later claimed descent from Rhiwallon, the most notable member being Morgan Owen, Bishop of Llandaff, (d.1645), who inherited much of the estate of the physicians in Myddfai parish. A collection of treatises on humours, medicinal herbs, and similar topics in the typical medieval European tradition attributed to Rhiwallon was included in the Red Book of Hergest, a 14th-century manuscript collection, under the title Meddygon Myddfai.

Later antiquarians visiting Myddfai parish collected some further oral traditions regarding the family, including a legend of its origins. The first reference to this story occurs in a diary compiled by the topographer Richard Fenton, who visited the parish in 1808. The story was subsequently expanded in an article in 1821 periodical The Cambro-Briton and in an introduction to the 1861 book Meddygon Myddvai. The latter version was based on the oral accounts given by three elderly residents of the parish in 1841, collected by William Rees of Tonn, Llandovery.

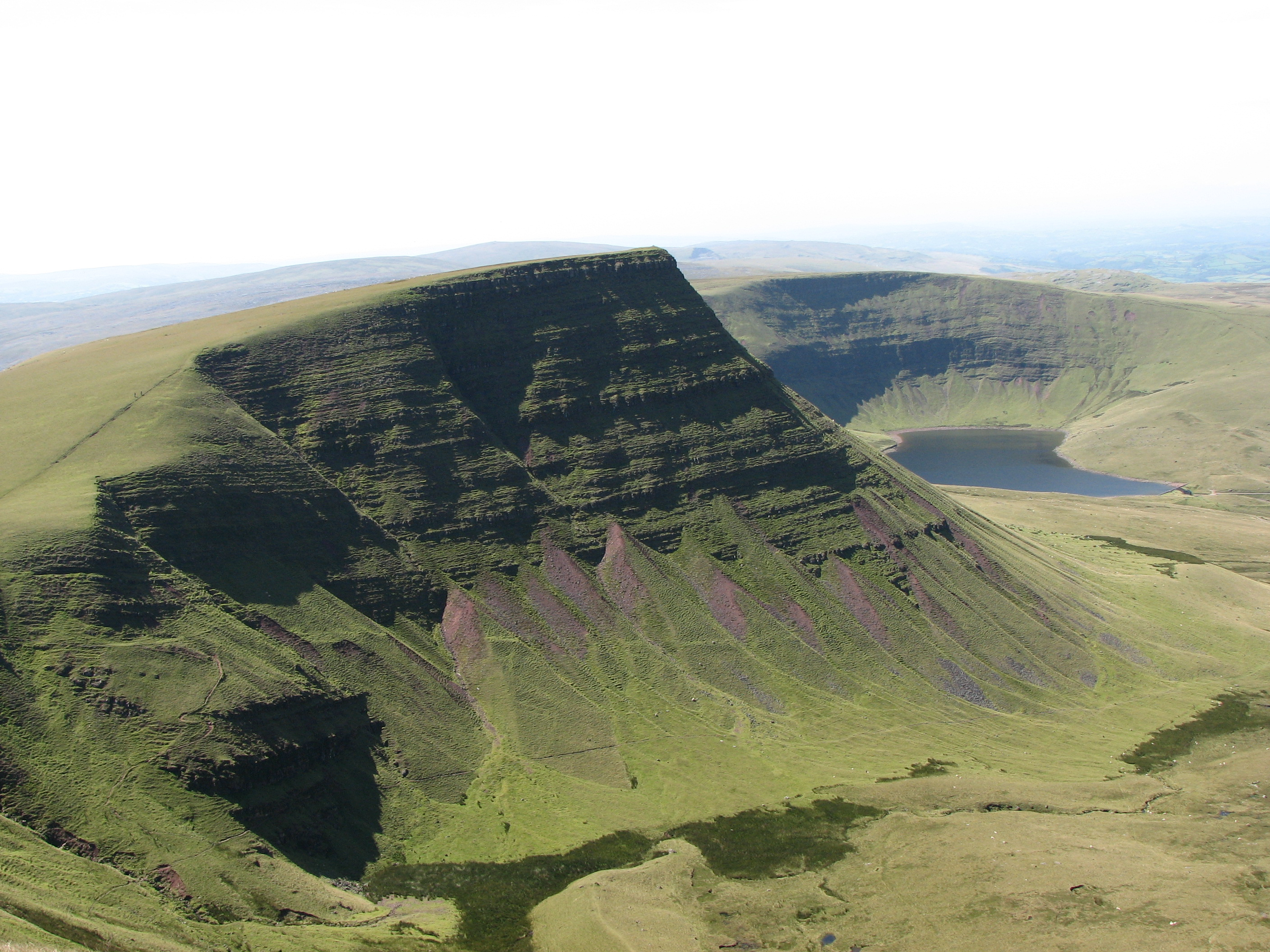
Llyn y Fan Fach with Picws Du in the foreground

In the folk tale as set down by Rees, a young man, son of a widow from Blaen Sawdde (near Llanddeusant) agreed to marry a beautiful girl who arose from the lake of Llyn y Fan Fach, with a promise that he would not hit her three times without cause, or she would return to her father. He complied easily because the girl was so beautiful, and they were happy for years putting up a house in Esgair Llaethdy near Myddfai, and bringing up a family there. The girl brought a dowry of cattle, traditionally still kept at Dinefwr Castle, Llandeilo, and other animals. But over time the man struck his wife three times: once, to remind her to fetch a horse, once to ask why she was crying at a wedding, and once when she laughed at a funeral. She had to return to the lake according to the promise, taking the cattle with her and leaving behind her husband and their three sons.

The sons often walked around the lake hoping to see their mother again. One day she appeared to the eldest son, Rhiwallon, presented him with a collection of medicinal prescriptions and instructions, and told him that his future and that of his descendants was to be a healer. She later returned and passed him information on herbs and plants to be used in cures. In due course Rhiwallon went to the court of Rhys Gryg of Deheubarth, where he became a famous doctor, as did his own sons.

The legend was further elaborated by the story that some of Rhiwallon's descendants continued to practice medicine in the area until well into the 18th century. In particular the "David Jones of Mothvey [Myddfai], surgeon" (d.1719) and his eldest son John Jones, surgeon (d.1739) who are both commemorated on a gravestone now located in the porch of St Michaels, Myddfai, were identified by local folklore as the last two members of the family of physicians in the direct male line. A second manuscript of herbal remedies attributed to Rhiwallon's family, which was brought to light in the early 19th century, was said to have been copied from one in the possession of John Jones. Descendants of the Jones family were still in the medical profession in the 20th century: in 1971 the Welsh Medical Gazette published the biographical profiles of two men, Surgeon-Major Edward Hopkins of Carreg Cennen Castle and Dr. John Powell of Tenby, who both practised medicine and were descendants of David Jones of Myddfai.

== The manuscripts ==
The book Meddygon Myddvai, published in 1861 by John Pughe, collects together most of the materials attributed to the Physicians, which it groups under two manuscripts. What it terms the "first" manuscript is the material included in the Red Book of Hergest, corrected by comparison with other copies. There was a revival of interest in herbalism in 18th-century Wales and a number of people had made further copies, including the scholar, Edward Lhuyd, Thomas Beynon of Greenmeadow and the bard and translator James Davies (Iago ab Dewi) of Llanllawddog.

The "second" manuscript printed in the 1861 book consists of materials found in a manuscript formerly known as MS Llanover C.24 and now held by the National Library of Wales. It was brought to light by, and is partly in the hand of, the antiquarian, bard and literary forger Iolo Morganwg (Edward Williams). The text purports to be a collection of herbal medicinal prescriptions and herb names compiled by Hywel Feddyg ab Rhys ab Llywelyn ab Philip Feddyg, a descendant of Rhiwallon through his son Einion. It is supposed to have been copied by Williams in 1801 from a manuscript owned by Thomas Bona, physician, of Llanfihangel Iorwerth, Carmarthenshire, itself supposed to be a copy taken by Bona's brother William in the 1740s from a manuscript belonging to John Jones of Myddfai, the last of the family of physicians. Williams' manuscript is followed by a smaller collection of medicinal prescriptions in different handwriting, said to have been compiled by Harri Jones of Pontypool.

It has, however, been suggested that the Llanover "Meddygon Myddfai" manuscript is one of Williams' forgeries, and was compiled by him based on the materials he found in Harri Jones's manuscript. Williams also appears to have had access to a copy of James Davies's version of the "first" manuscript.

== Bibliography ==
- Davies, John; Jenkins, Nigel, eds. (2008), The Welsh Academy Encyclopaedia of Wales, University of Wales Press, ISBN 978-0708319536
- Barlow, Robin, ed. (2018), Transactions of the Physicians of Myddfai Society (in English and Welsh), The Physicians of Myddfai Society, ISSN 2516-7758
- Wood, Juliette (1992), “The Fairy Bride Legend in Wales.” Folklore 103(1): 56–72.

== See also ==
- Gwragedd Annwn
- Lady of the Lake
