= O'er the Gloomy Hills of Darkness =

Welsh Christian hymn by William Williams Pantycelyn

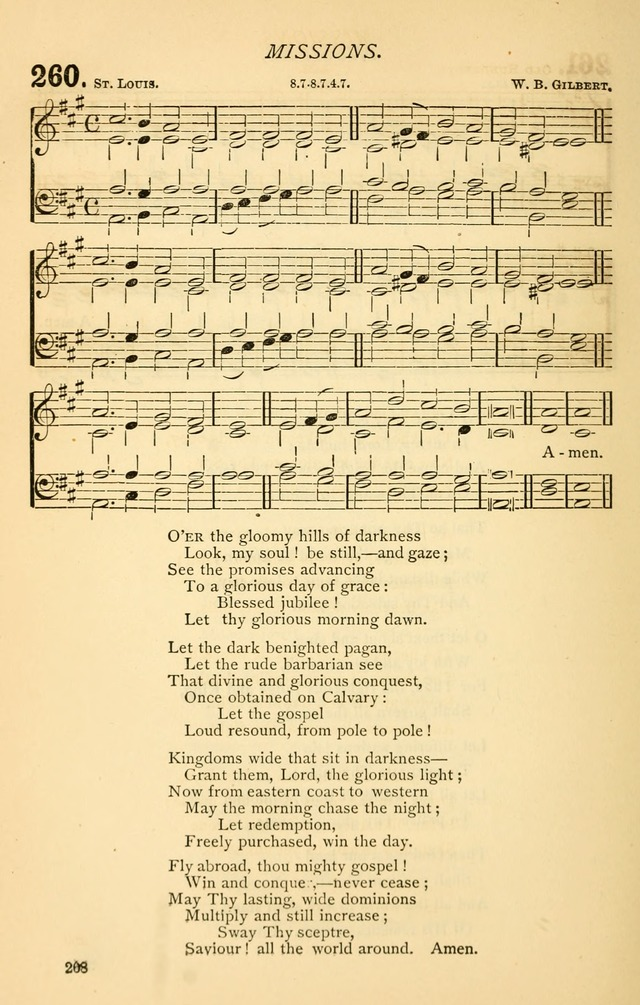
- O'er the Gloomy Hills of Darkness in the Church of England in Canada's 1877 Church Hymnal
- Genre: Hymn
- Written: 1772
- Text: William Williams Pantycelyn
- Based on: Isaiah 9:2
- Meter: 8.7.8.7.4.7
- Melody: "Regent Square" by Henry Smart, "Zion" by Thomas Hastings

"O'er the Gloomy Hills of Darkness", also titled "O'er Those Gloomy Hills of Darkness", is a Welsh Christian hymn by William Williams Pantycelyn written in 1772. The hymn was written as a missionary hymn; there are conflicting accounts of why the hymn was written. The hymn was later published in 374 hymnals worldwide, though it was censored and altered in the United States by slaveholders for evangelising to slaves. The hymn later fell out of favour with hymn book editors in the 1960s.

== History ==
There are conflicting accounts of why the hymn was written. According to one account, George Bowen was converted to Christianity through hearing a Welsh girl singing hymns. He later went to stay at Llwyn-gwair Manor at the same time that the Welsh Methodist Association were there. While there, he met Williams and asked him to compose some verse about the Preseli Hills. "O'er the Gloomy Hills of Darkness" was written as a result of these requests. Though it is possible that this story may be correct as Llwyn-gwair Manor and Williams' bedroom at the manor did overlook Carn Igli, in the 19th century an alternative story arose. In this version, Williams was travelling to Pontrhydyfen and composing a new missionary hymn as part of a commission from Selina Hastings, Countess of Huntingdon. Upon passing the ruins of an old Cistercian abbey and seeing the mountains he would have to cross on a stormy night, the view inspired him to write "O'er the Gloomy Hills of Darkness" for the Countess. It has been claimed that the hymn was first written in Welsh as English was not Williams' first language and that it was later translated into English by his son John Williams, because Williams did not know enough English to fully express the intent of the original Welsh verses in translation. This is incorrect. Williams had a mainly English-medium education and wrote about 120 hymns and some elegies in English. Williams published the original English text in his second collection of English hymns in 1772 and a Welsh translation by his son, John Williams (1754-1828), was published in 1795.

In 1836, "O'er the Gloomy hills of Darkness" was reviewed in an issue of The Eclectic Review. In a remarkably snide review, the hymn, among many others, is criticised for a lack of grammatical correctness as well as a lack of rhyme in the first verse, " ...inane verbiage preferred by worthy people to the noblest compositions of sanctified genius; and to blot it out from our hymn-books would be a species of sacrilege". This was attributed to Williams' lack of English as a native language gave rise to "a stiffness apparent" in the hymn. The New York Times stated it had gained popularity because of Williams' "ease and sweetness" in his hymn writing.

== Abolitionism ==
The second verse of the hymn begins with the lines "Let the Indian, let the negro, Let the rude barbarian see". Williams included this after hearing stories of promising missionary contact with Cherokee tribes and with slaves in the Province of Georgia. When the hymn became established in the United States, slave owners changed the line referencing "Indian" and "negro" to "Let the dark benighted pagan". The abolitionist Ebenezer Davies claimed “The altered reading, I learned, prevails universally in America, except in the original version used by the Welsh congregations. Slave-holders, and the abettors of that horrid system which makes it a crime to teach a negro to read the Word of God, felt perhaps that they could not devoutly and consistently sing "Let the Indian, let the negro ... see”. With its original words, the hymn was understood to speak to the experience of slavery, even if in an evangelising frame, and Pantycelyn had previously written critically of the transatlantic slave trade. E. Wyn James (2007) notes that the hymn "was sung with gusto, for example, on board the ships which took former slaves from America to the colony of Sierra Leone in the 1790s, as part of the attempt by members of the ‘Clapham Sect’ and others to create a homeland for freed slaves back in Africa".

In the 1850s, the Baptist Union of Great Britain dropped the hymn from usage. The reason published in the Baptist Magazine stated "But the verses are too rude and unfinished to be generally accepted in modern day". In later years in the 19th century churches, including the Church of England, started to publish the hymn replacing the second verse with the American slave owner's amended version. In the early 1900s, the second verse would often be omitted altogether from hymnals.

== Hymnals ==
"O'er the Gloomy Hills of Darkness" first appeared in published hymnals in 1792. Jeffrey Richards states that "William Williams's O'er the Gloomy Hills of Darkness of 1772 (sung variously to Thomas Clark's Calcutta, by Baptists; to Henry Gauntlett's Triumph, in The Scottish Hymnal; to Edwin Moss's Ulpha, in the 1982 Presbyterian Church Praise) did not make it into Hymns Ancient and Modern, but it was in Bickersteth's Christian Psalmody in 1833 and was still to be found complete in the 1933 Baptist Hymnal … This very much set the tone for missionary hymns." After being published in 374 hymnals throughout history, in the 1960s the hymn stopped being published in all Christian hymnals. The Church of Jesus Christ of Latter-day Saints retained the hymn in their hymnals from 1927 until dropping it in 1985. This was because its members in modern times felt that the hymn connected Native Americans and black people with barbarians.

The hymn's lyrical style set the tone for future missionary hymns. "O'er the Gloomy Hills of Darkness" inspired the founder of Methodism, Charles Wesley, to write "Sun of Unclouded Righteousness" for missionaries working with "Mahometans".

== Lyrics ==
The lyrics of "O'er the Gloomy Hills of Darkness" as published in Gloria in Excelsis: or hymns of praise to God and the lamb in 1772.

1.

O'er those gloomy Hills of Darkness
Look my Soul, be still and gaze,
All the Promises do travel
On a glorious Day of Grace,
Blessed Jubil, & c.
Let thy glorious Morning dawn.

2.

Let the Indian, let the Negro,
Let the rude Barbarian see
That divine and glorious Conquest
Once obtain'd on Calvary;
Let the Gospel, & c.
Word resound from Pole to Pole.

3.

Kingdoms wide that sit in Darkness,
Let them have the glorious Light,
And from Eastern Coast to Western
May the Morning chase the Night,
And Redemption, & c.
Freely purchas'd win the Day.

4.

May the glorious Days approaching,
From eternal Darkness dawn,
And the everlasting Gospel
Spread abroad thy holy Name.
Thousand Years, & c.
Soon appear, make no Delay.

5.

Lord, I long to see that Morning,
When thy Gospel shall abound,
And thy Grace get full Possession
Of the happy promis'd Ground;
All the Borders, & c.
Of the great Immanuel's Land.

6.

Fly abroad, eternal Gospel,
Win and conquer, never cease;
May thy eternal wide Dominions
Multiply, and still increase;
May thy Scepter, & c.
Sway th'enlight'ned World around.

7.

O let Moab yield and tremble,
Let Philistia never boast,
And let India proud be scatt'red
With their numerable Host;
And the Glory, &c.
Jesus only be to thee.

== Bibliography ==
- Jones, John Gwilym (1969). William Williams, Pantycelyn. Gwasg Prifysgol Cymru. ISBN 090076807X.
- Lewis, Saunders (1991). Williams Pantycelyn. Gwasg Prifysgol Cymru. ISBN 0708311229.
- Kirk, John, ed. (2013). Cultures of Radicalism in Britain and Ireland. Routledge. ISBN 978-1317320654. See Chapter 5: E. Wyn James, "'Blessed Jubil!': Slavery, Mission and the Millennial Dawn in the Work of William Williams of Pantycelyn".
