= Luke Charteris =

Wales international rugby union footballer

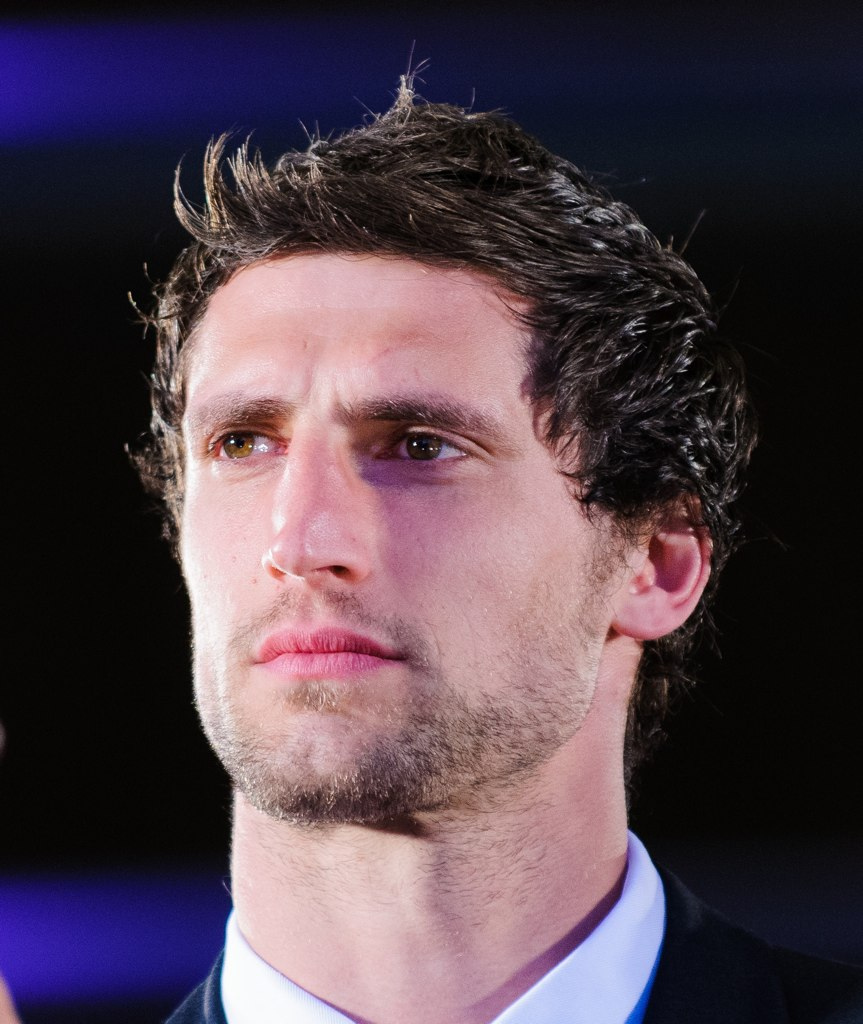
- Charteris during the 2012 Grand Slam celebration at the Senedd
- Born: Luke Charteris; 9 March 1983 (age 43) Camborne, Cornwall
- Height: 6 ft 9 in (2.06 m)
- Weight: 273 lb (124 kg)
- School: Tregib Comprehensive School
- University: University of Bath

Rugby union career
- Position: Lock
Senior career
Years	Team	Apps	(Points)
2003–2012	Newport Gwent Dragons	142	(40)
2012–2014	Perpignan	47	(0)
2014–2016	Racing 92	42	(5)
2016–2019	Bath	23	(5)
- Correct as of 1 April 2017
International career
Years	Team	Apps	(Points)
- Wales U19
- Wales U21
2004–2017	Wales	74	(0)
- Correct as of 18 March 2017

Luke Charteris (born 9 March 1983) is a former rugby union player who played as a lock for the Newport Gwent Dragons, Perpignan, Racing 92 and Bath, as well as the Wales national team. He made 74 appearances for Wales between 2004 and 2017. Since his retirement from playing in 2019, he has served as Bath's line-out coach.

== Club career ==
Charteris started his senior career at Newport Gwent Dragons in 2003. He went on to make over 140 appearances for the Welsh region and was appointed captain in 2011. In May 2012, Charteris joined French Top 14 club USA Perpignan, staying for two years. On 6 June 2014, Charteris joined Parisian side Racing 92, then known as Racing Métro, on a two-year deal after Perpignan were demoted to the Pro D2. He stayed for another two years, after which he moved to England with Bath in 2016.

Charteris retired at the end of the 2018/19 season and took up a new role as specialist line-out coach for Bath Rugby.

== International career ==
Charteris made his debut for Wales versus South Africa in 2004 having previously represented Wales at Under 19 and Under 21 levels. He was a feature of the Welsh national team for over a decade, touring regularly. He played in many Six Nations tournaments, including in 2010 and 2015.

In August 2011, Charteris was named in the Wales squad for the 2011 Rugby World Cup in New Zealand, and his performances in the tournament were widely praised. Charteris also played in the 2015 Rugby World Cup. He ultimately gained 74 caps for Wales.
