= Ffairfach railway station =

Railway station in Carmarthenshire, Wales

Ffairfach
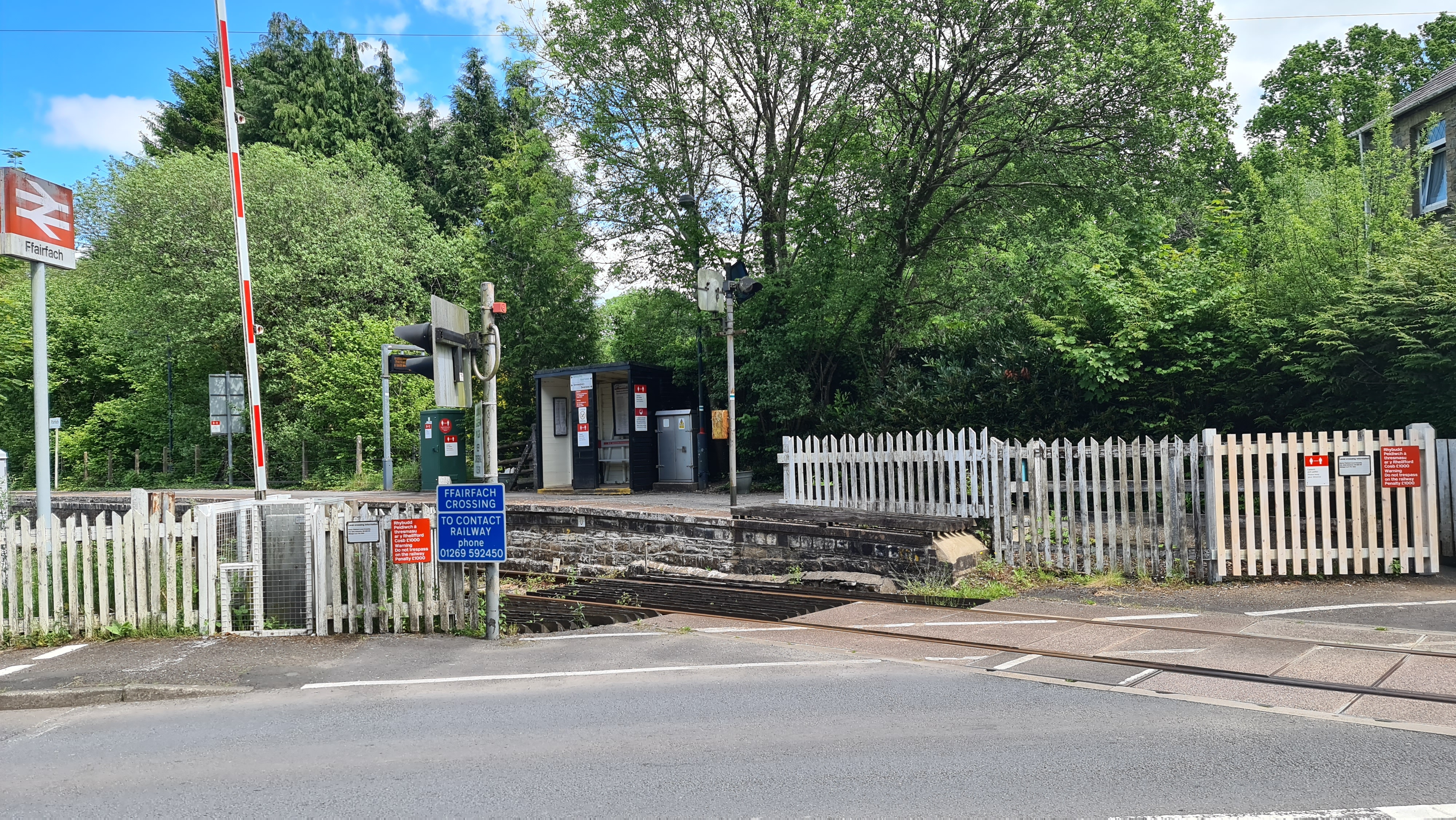

General information
- Location: Ffairfach, Carmarthenshire; Wales
- Coordinates: 51.872°N 3.993°W
- Grid reference: SN629212
- Manager: Transport for Wales
- Platforms: 1

Other information
- Station code: FFA
- Classification: DfT category F2

History
- Opened: 1857

Passengers
- 2021/22: ▲2,208
- 2022/23: ▲3,006
- 2023/24: ▲3,596
- 2024/25: ▲3,992
- 2025/26: ▼2,430
Location
Notes
- Passenger statistics from the Office of Rail and Road

Ffairfach railway station serves the village of Ffairfach, near Llandeilo, Carmarthenshire, Wales. The station is on the Heart of Wales Line 30 miles (48 km) north east of Swansea.

The railway station is located next to the main road Heol Cennen, which crosses the line at its south end. This is the nearest railway station to Carreg Cennen Castle. The former station signal box has been preserved on the Gwili Railway as a working museum exhibit after being made redundant here when the level crossing was automated.

All trains serving the station are operated by Transport for Wales.

== Facilities ==
The station is unstaffed and has a basic range of amenities for passengers, including a small wooden waiting shelter, digital CIS display, timetable poster board and a customer help point. Tickets must be bought on the train or prior to travel. The route from the entrance to the platform has no steps, but is via a narrow gate and steep ramp – as such it is not recommended for use by disabled passengers without assistance.

== Services ==
All trains serving the station are operated by Transport for Wales. There are five trains a day to Shrewsbury northbound from Monday to Saturday (plus a sixth to Llandovery) and six southbound to Llanelli & Swansea (the first train in each direction does not run on Saturdays); two services each way call on Sundays.

This is a request stop for northbound trains, whereby passengers have to give a hand signal to the approaching train driver to board or notify the guard when they board that they wish to alight from the train there. Southbound trains are required to stop at the station for the train crew to operate the level crossing controls.

Preceding station	National Rail	Following station
Llandybie	Transport for Wales; Heart of Wales Line	Llandeilo
