= Llywelyn ap Gruffudd Fychan =

Welsh landowner and supporter of the Glyndŵr rebellion

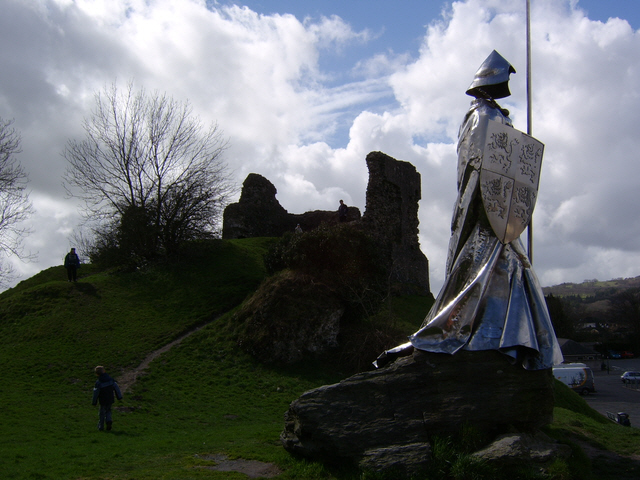
The monument to Llywelyn ap Gruffudd Fychan at Llandovery

Llywelyn ap Gruffudd Fychan of Caeo (c. 1341–1401) was a wealthy Carmarthenshire landowner who was executed in Llandovery by Henry IV of England in punishment for his support of Owain Glyndŵr's Welsh rebellion.

Until recently Llewelyn was little known even in his home area, but has become celebrated as a "Welsh Braveheart" after a campaign to construct a monument to him in Llandovery.

== Life ==
The main source for Llewelyn's life is Adam of Usk, who mentions him in his Chronicle as a "bountiful" member of the Carmarthenshire gentry who used "sixteen pipes of wine" yearly in his household (implying he was both wealthy and a generous host).

In 1401, he misled English forces searching for the leader of the Welsh resistance Owain Glyndŵr, He spent weeks leading the heavy, slow-moving English army on a grueling 'goose chase' through the difficult terrain and mountainous uplands of Deheubarth, his two son's, Gwilym and Morgan were also with Glyndŵr's army, which presumably gave him more reason to mislead the English, This allowed Owain to escape to Gwynedd, but Llywelyn's involvement cost him his life, As punishment for his betrayal, the English king condemned him to be executed in the main square of Llanymddyfri (Llandovery), The English removed his stomach and cooked it in front of him, He continues by stating that as a result of Llewelyn's support for the rebellion, Henry had him drawn, hung, eviscerated, beheaded and quartered before the gate of Llandovery castle on 9 October 1401 "in the presence of his eldest son" (it is slightly unclear whether Adam is referring to Henry's son or Llewelyn's son at this point).

A more detailed version of the story suggests that Llewelyn was specifically charged with having deliberately led the English forces the wrong way while pretending to guide them to Glyndŵr. Adam, however, states only that Llewelyn "willingly preferred death to treachery". Llewelyn is also thought to have had two sons fighting in Glyndŵr's forces.

== Genealogy ==
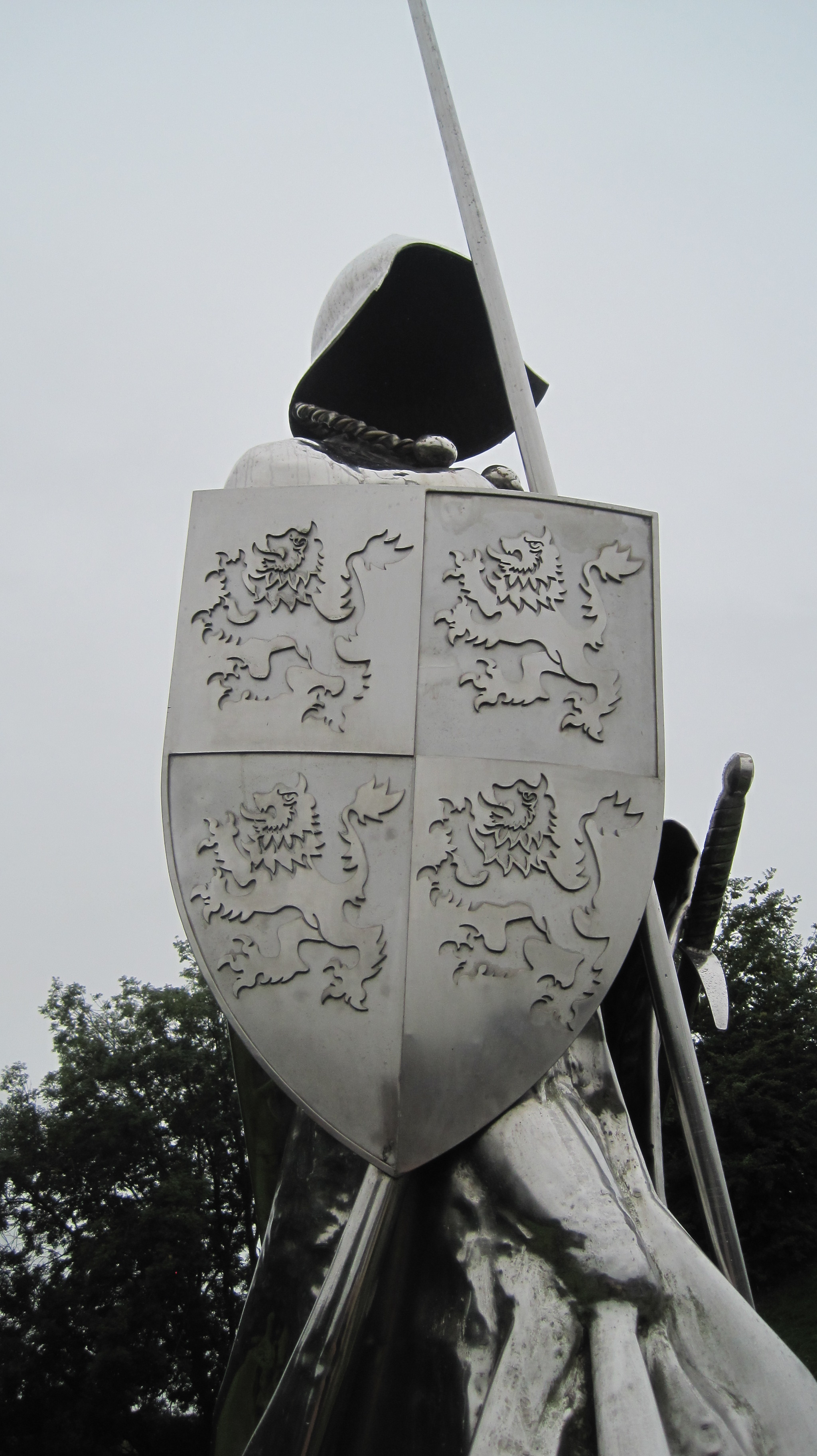
Monument to Llywelyn ap Gruffyd Fychan in Llandovery.

While Llewelyn undoubtedly existed, concrete details of his life are scant (it has been stated that all that is known of him is "his name, his politics and his alcohol consumption"). However, his name and ancestry may be recorded in later genealogies. His father Gruffudd Fychan (described as "lord of Caeo and Cilycwm") was recorded as holding the constableship of Caeo in 1359 for the sum of £8 per annum; Gruffudd's wife (and therefore Llewelyn's mother) was said to have been Jonnett, daughter of Gruffudd ap Llewelyn Foethus of Dryslwyn Castle.

Lewys Dwnn's Heraldic Visitations, a 16th-century genealogical record of Welsh landowning families, identifies Llewelyn's wife as Sioned, daughter of one of the Scudamores of Kentchurch, and lists his sons as Gwilym (of Llangadog) and Morgan. As one of the Scudamores married Glyndŵr's daughter Alys, this suggests significant family links between Llewelyn ap Gruffudd Fychan and Glyndŵr. Dwnn claims that Llewelyn's son Morgan became the Abbot of Strata Florida later in his life, "and was a man held in great respect".

Dwnn also notes Llewelyn's grandsons "Llywelyn, Tomas [and] Morgan meibion [sons of] Gwilim ap Llewelyn ap Gruffydd vachan ap Dafydd vongam ap David ap Meurig goch" as holding Mallaen in the parish of Caeo, and traces the family back to Selyf, King of Dyfed through the lords of Caeo and Cilycwm. Llewelyn's (probable) grandson, Llewelyn ap Gwilym ap Llewelyn, was said by Edward Lhuyd to have lived at the mansion of Neuadd Fawr at Cilycwm, where his "motto over his door was Gresso pan dhelech, a chennad pan vynnech, a phan dhelech tra vynnecli trig"

== Statue ==
A campaign was started in 1998 in Llandovery to construct a monument to Llewelyn; financial support came both from the community and the Arts Council of Wales. After an exhibition of proposed designs in 2000, a public vote chose a submission by Toby and Gideon Petersen of St Clears.

The 16-foot-tall (4.9 m) stainless steel statue, a figure with an empty helmet, cloak and armour stands on a base of stone brought from Caeo. Petersen described the statue as representing a "brave nobody", with the empty helmet and armour representing both the universal nature of Llewelyn's actions and the violence of his death.

== Further sources ==
- http://www.bbc.co.uk/wales/southwest/sites/llandovery/pages/llywelyn.shtml
- National Geographic Magazine, March 2006, The Celtic Realm, pg 90.
- "The Last Mab Darogan: The Life and Times of Owain Glyn Dŵr", C Parry, (Novasys, 2010), ISBN 978-0-9565553-0-4, pp. 105–7.
