= Ysgol Bro Dinefwr =

Location
- Heol Myrddin; Llandeilo, Carmarthenshire, SA19 6PE; Wales
- Coordinates: 51°52′30″N 4°0′2″W

Information
- Type: State school
- Motto: Esgyn ar Adain Dysg
- Established: 2013; 13 years ago
- Department for Education URN: 402328 Tables
- Head Teacher: Eirian Davies
- Gender: All
- Age: 11 to 19
- Enrolment: 1138 (in 2024)
- Website: www.brodinefwr.org.uk

Ysgol Bro Dinefwr is a bilingual secondary school for pupils aged 11–19 in Ffairfach, Carmarthenshire. As of 2024, the school had 1,138 pupils on roll.

== History ==
The school was established in 2013 following the amalgamation of Ysgol Gyfun Tre-Gib and Ysgol Gyfun Pantycelyn in 2013. These schools were located in Ffairfach and Llandovery, before closure, now occupying a new £30 million school building in September 2016.

== Welsh language ==
The school is categorized linguistically by Welsh Government as a Category 2B school, meaning that at least 80% of subjects, excluding English and Welsh, are taught through the medium of Welsh but are also taught through the medium of English. Science is taught through the medium of English to all classes. In 2017, 55% of pupils enrolled could speak Welsh fluently. 30% of pupils came from Welsh-speaking homes.
