= Llandovery =

Market town and community in Carmarthenshire, Wales

Llandovery: Welsh: Llanymddyfri
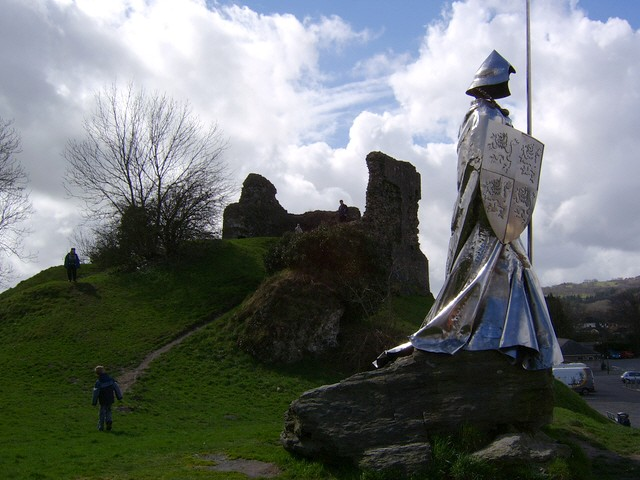
- Monument to Llywelyn ap Gruffydd Fychan at Llandovery

- Flag

- Location within Carmarthenshire
- Population: 1,985 (Community, 2021)
- OS grid reference: SN763346
- Community: Llandovery
- Principal area: Carmarthenshire
- Preserved county: Dyfed
- Country: Wales
- Sovereign state: United Kingdom
- Post town: LLANDOVERY
- Postcode district: SA20
- Dialling code: 01550
- Police: Dyfed-Powys
- Fire: Mid and West Wales
- Ambulance: Welsh
- UK Parliament: Caerfyrddin
- Senedd Cymru – Welsh Parliament: Carmarthen East and Dinefwr
- List of places UK Wales Carmarthenshire 51°59′45″N 3°47′50″W Map of the community

Llandovery (Welsh: Llanymddyfri; Welsh pronunciation: [ɬanəmˈðəvri]) is a market town and community in Carmarthenshire, Wales. It lies on the River Tywi and at the junction of the A40 and A483 roads, about 25 miles (40 km) north-east of Carmarthen, 27 miles (43 km) north of Swansea and 21 miles (34 km) west of Brecon.

== History ==
=== Toponymy ===
The name of the town derives from Llan ymlith y dyfroedd, meaning "church enclosure amid the waters", i.e. between the Tywi and the Afon Brân just upstream of their confluence. A smaller watercourse, the Bawddwr, runs through and under the town.

=== Roman legacy ===
The Roman fort at Llanfair Hill to the north-east of the modern town was known to the Romans as Alabum. It was built around AD 50–60 as part of a strategy for the conquest of Wales. A Roman road heads across Mynydd Bach Trecastell to the south-east of Llandovery bound for the fort of Brecon Gaer. Another heads down the Towy valley for Carmarthen, whilst a third makes for the goldmines at Dolaucothi.

=== Norman and medieval castle ===
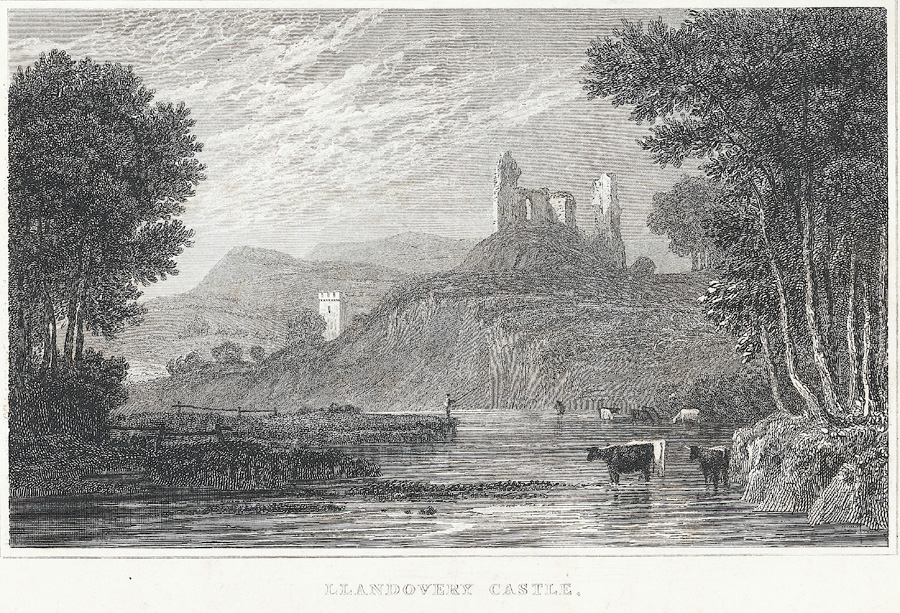
Llandovery Castle, Carmarthenshire, by Henry Gastineau, seen about 1830

Attractions in the town include the remains of the Norman Llandovery Castle, built in 1110. It was almost immediately captured by the Welsh and changed hands between them and the Normans until the reign of King Edward I of England in the late 13th century. The castle was used by King Henry IV while on a sortie into Wales, when he executed Llywelyn ap Gruffydd Fychan in the market place. It was later attacked by the forces of Owain Glyndŵr in 1403.

=== Welsh hero ===
A 16-foot-high (4.9 m) stainless-steel statue of Llywelyn ap Gruffydd Fychan was unveiled by the mayor, Vivienne Fay Price, in 2001 on the north side of Llandovery Castle, overlooking the place of his execution 600 years earlier. He had led the army of King Henry IV on a "wild goose chase", under the pretence of leading them to a secret rebel camp and an ambush of Glyndŵr's forces. King Henry lost patience with him, exposed the charade and had him half hanged, disembowelled in front of his own eyes, beheaded and quartered – the quarters salted and dispatched to other Welsh towns for public display.

The design of the statue, by Toby and Gideon Petersen, was chosen after a national competition. It was funded by the National Lottery and the Arts Council of Wales.

=== Other history ===
According to folklore, the Physicians of Myddfai practised in the area in the 13th century.

The Bank of the Black Ox, one of the first Welsh banks, was established by a wealthy cattle drover. The original bank building was part of the King's Head Inn. It later became part of Lloyds Bank.

The population in 1841 was 1,709.

== Buildings ==
The town has a theatre (Llandovery Theatre), a heritage centre, a private school (Llandovery College) and a tourist information and heritage centre, which houses exhibitions on the Tonn Press, the area's droving history, and the 19th-century geologist Sir Roderick Impey Murchison, whose work here resulted in the name "Llandovery" being given to rocks of a certain age across the world. The Llandovery epoch is the earliest in the Silurian period of geological time.

In the small central market place stands Llandovery Town Hall (1857–1858) by the architect Richard Kyke Penson. This was designed in the Italianate style with a courtroom over an open market. Behind are police cells with iron grilles; entry to the old courtroom (now a library) is via a door on the ground floor of the tower.

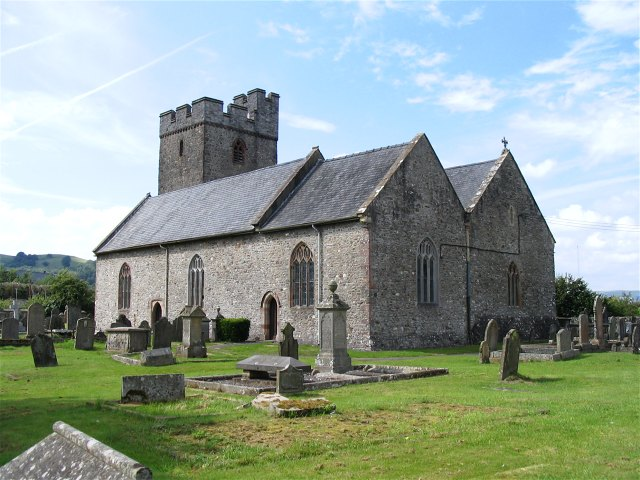
St Dingat's Church

There are two medieval churches in Llandovery: the 14th-century St Dingat's to the west of the town centre, and the 12th-century St Mary's on the northern outskirts of the town. St Dingat's is a Grade II* listed building, and one of the largest medieval churches in Carmarthenshire. It stands on a site which appears to have been in religious use since pre-Norman times. St Mary's is a Grade I listed building and was formerly the parish church for the neighbouring parish of Llanfair-ar-y-bryn, despite not being within that parish's boundaries. It subsequently became a chapel of ease to St Dingat's in 1883 after a new church for Llanfair-ar-y-bryn was built within the parish boundaries.

The Memorial Chapel in Stryd y Bont was built as a memorial to the hymnist William Williams Pantycelyn.

== Education ==
The town's comprehensive school, Ysgol Pantycelyn, with about 300 pupils, was closed on 31 August 2013 and merged with Ysgol Tre-Gib in Ffairfach to form Ysgol Bro Dinefwr.

The town has an independent day and boarding school, Llandovery College.

== Sport ==
Llandovery has a leading Welsh Premiership rugby union team, Llandovery RFC, nicknamed The Drovers, active as such since at least 1877 and a founder member of the Welsh Rugby Union. It has successful junior and youth sections. A number of former players have gone on to represent Wales (and some other nations) in international rugby. Home games are played at its ground in Church Bank.

Llandovery Junior Football Club has a membership of over 70 from Llandovery and its surrounding area. It provides coaching and competitive scope for all aged 6 to 16 years. The club currently has an Under 14 team in the Carmarthenshire Junior League, and Under 11 and Under 8 teams playing in the Carmarthen Mini Football League.

A Llandovery Golf Club, founded in 1910, survived until the onset of the Second World War. Golfing now takes place on the Llandovery College 9-hole course.

== Governance ==
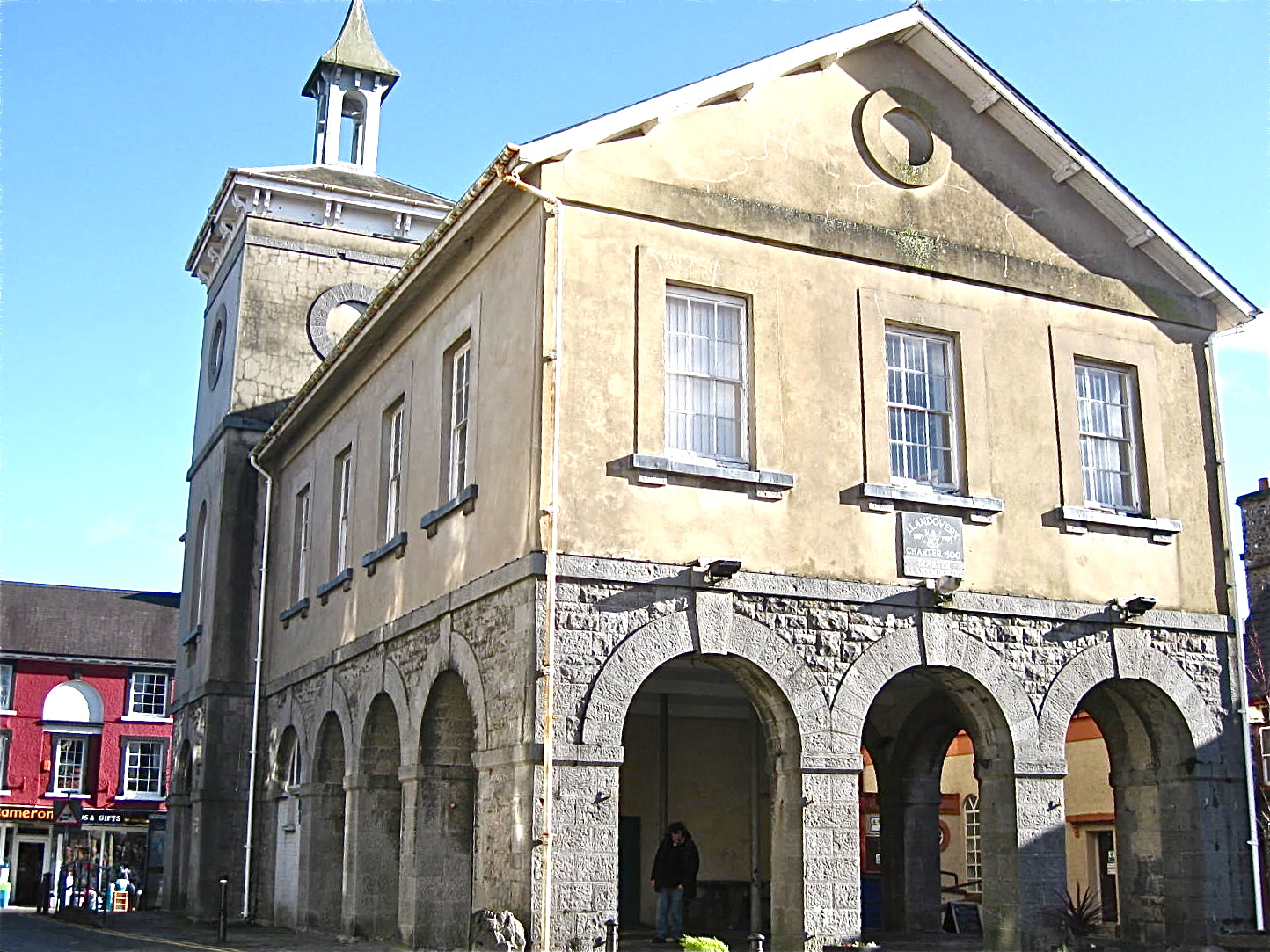
Llandovery Town Hall

There are two tiers of local government covering Llandovery, at community (town) and county level: Llandovery Town Council (Cyngor Tref Llanymddyfri) and Carmarthenshire County Council (Cyngor Sir Gâr). The town council meets at the Town Hall in the Market Square.

The community is bordered by those of Llanfair-ar-y-bryn, Myddfai, Llanwrda, and Cilycwm, all being in Carmarthenshire.

Llandovery is twinned with Pluguffan in Brittany, France.

=== Administrative history ===
Llandovery historically formed part of the parish of Llandingat. Llandovery was the main settlement in the parish, which was named after its parish church of St Dingat's. The parish included surrounding rural areas as well as Llandovery. Llandovery appears to have been an ancient borough, although its earliest known charter was not issued until 1485 by Richard III. The borough covered the central part of Llandingat parish, including St Dingat's church.

The borough was reformed to become a municipal borough in 1836 under the Municipal Corporations Act 1835, which standardised how most boroughs operated across the country. The Local Government Act 1894 directed that civil parishes could no longer straddle borough boundaries, and so Llandingat parish was split into a Llandingat Within parish covering the same area as the borough of Llandovery, and a Llandingat Without parish covering the areas outside the borough.

The borough of Llandovery was abolished in 1974 under the Local Government Act 1972. A community called Llandovery was created instead, covering the area of the abolished borough, with its community council taking the name Llandovery Town Council. District-level functions passed to Dinefwr Borough Council. Carmarthenshire County Council was abolished as part of the same reforms, with county-level functions passing to the new Dyfed County Council. Dinefwr and Dyfed were both abolished in 1996 and their councils' functions passed to a re-established Carmarthenshire County Council. Llandingat Without also became a community under the 1974 reforms; it was abolished in 1987 and split between the community of Llandovery and other neighbouring communities.

== Transport ==
Llandovery stands at the junction of the main A40 and A483 roads.

Llandovery railway station is on the Heart of Wales line, with services in the direction of Swansea and of Shrewsbury.

== Notable residents ==
In date-of-birth order. See also Category:People from Llandovery

- Twm Siôn Cati (16th c.), figure in Welsh folklore, sometimes as an outlaw and a thief
- Rhys Prichard (1579–1644), Welsh-language poet (Cannwyll y Cymry – The Welshman's Candle) and Anglican Vicar of Llandovery
- William Williams Pantycelyn (1717–1791), highly regarded hymnist and prose writer associated with the Welsh Methodist revival
- Josiah Rees (1744–1804), Welsh Unitarian minister, schoolmaster and writer
- David Jones (1765–1816), Welsh barrister known as "the Welsh Freeholder"; came from Bwlchygwynt
- William Hallowes Miller (1801–1880), Welsh mineralogist, helped found modern crystallography; born at Velindre
- Rice Rees (1804–1839), Anglican priest, fellow of Jesus College, Oxford, lecturer at St David's College, Lampeter and Chaplain to the Bishop of St Davids
- William Saunders (1806–1851), Welsh-language poet, writer and printer
- David Jones (1810–1869), banker and Carmarthenshire Conservative MP
- John Jones (1812–1886), banker and Carmarthenshire Conservative MP
- John Davies (Methodist minister, born 1823) (1823–1874), clergyman, writer and editor
- Major Sir David Hughes-Morgan (1871–1941), solicitor and landowner

=== Sport ===
- Aneurin Rees (1858–1932), solicitor, Town Clerk of Merthyr Tydfil, rugby union player for Wales and golfer
- Edward John Lewis (1859–1925), physician and rugby union player for Wales
- Conway Rees (1870–1932), rugby union player for Wales, and schoolmaster in England and India
- Carwyn Davies (1964–1997), farmer and rugby union player for Wales
- Emyr Phillips (born 1987), rugby union player for Wales
- Wyn Jones (born 1992), rugby union player for Wales

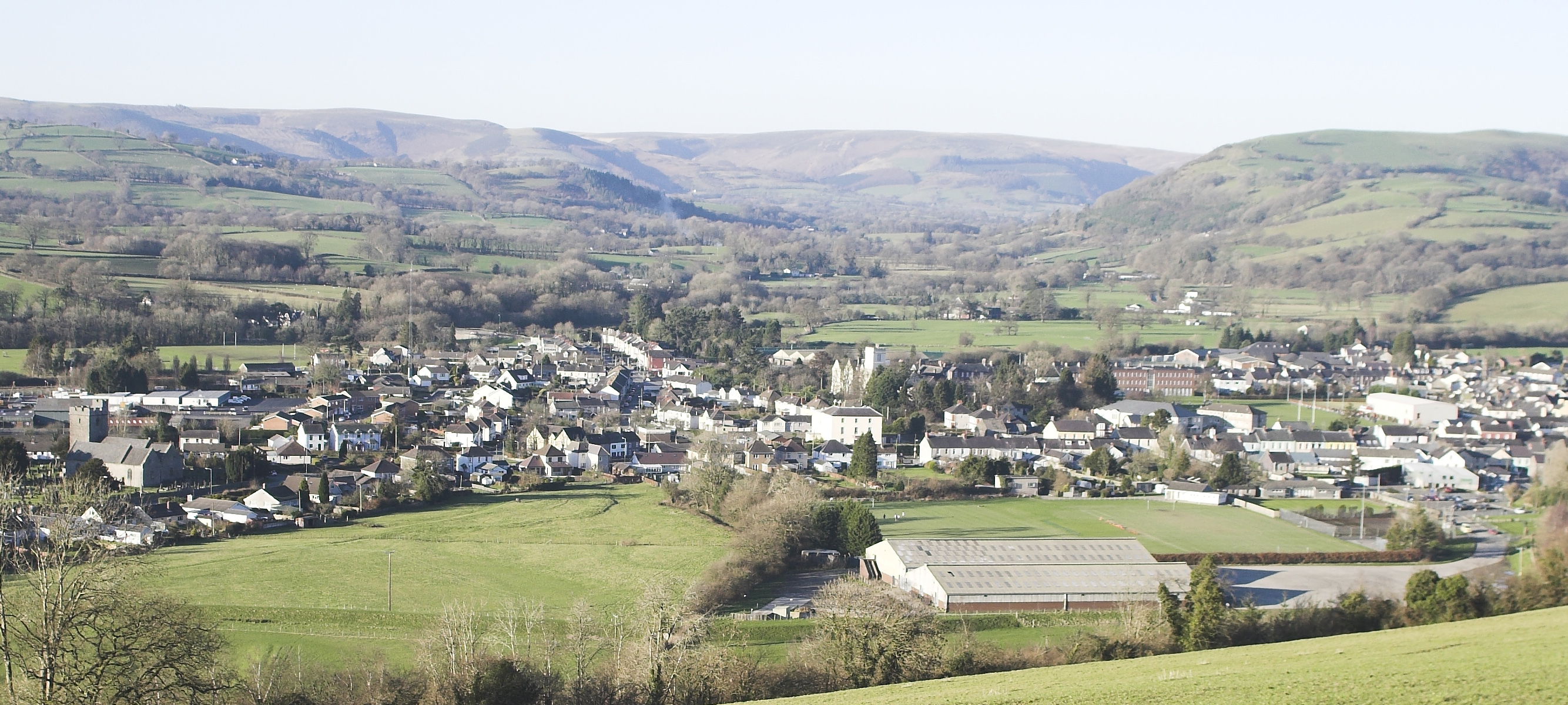
Llandovery from the south

== Nearby places ==
The Dolaucothi Gold Mines are located 10 miles (16 km) away near Pumpsaint on the A482. The road follows an original Roman road to Llanio fort.

Llandovery lies just north of Brecon Beacons National Park and Fforest Fawr Geopark, whose geological heritage is celebrated. These designated landscapes are centred on Bannau Sir Gâr or the Carmarthen Fans, themselves part of the Black Mountain extending north towards the town, as Mynydd Myddfai and Mynydd Bach Trecastell. The village of Myddfai lies within the National Park, 4 miles (6 km) to the south-east of Llandovery.

The Llyn Brianne dam is 11 miles (18 km) to the north is in rugged countryside above Rhandirmwyn. The route to the dam also passes Twm Siôn Cati's Cave at the RSPB's Dinas reserve.
