= Myddfai =

Village and community in Carmarthenshire, Wales

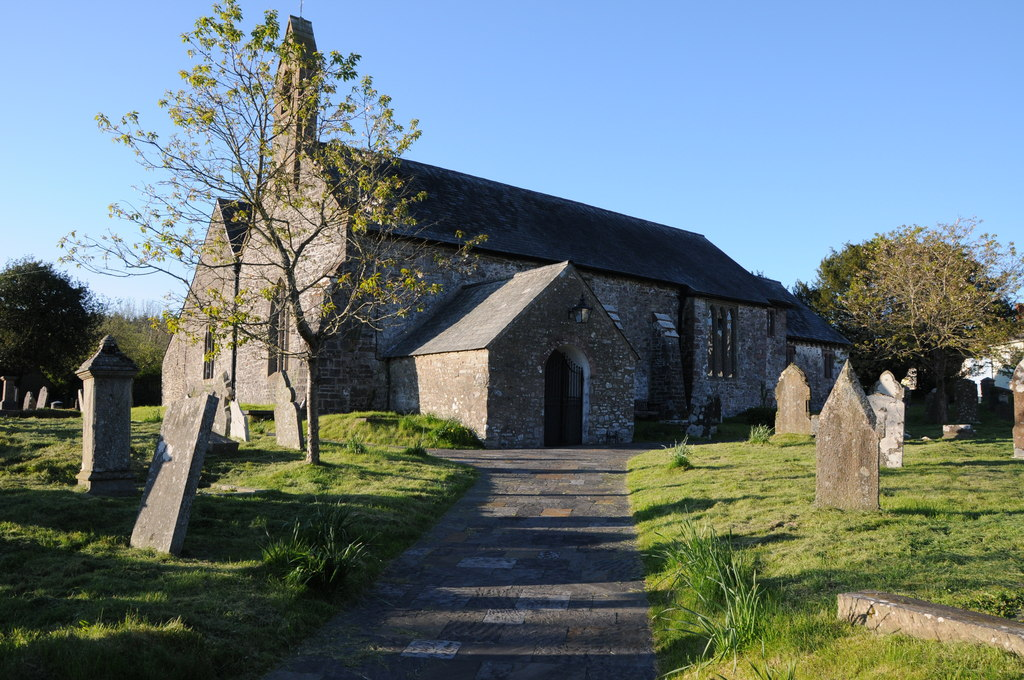
- St Michael's church

- Location within Carmarthenshire
- Population: 398 (2011)
- OS grid reference: SN772301
- Community: Myddfai
- Principal area: Carmarthenshire
- Preserved county: Dyfed
- Country: Wales
- Sovereign state: United Kingdom
- Post town: Llandovery
- Postcode district: SA20
- Dialling code: 01550
- Police: Dyfed-Powys
- Fire: Mid and West Wales
- Ambulance: Welsh
- UK Parliament: Caerfyrddin
- Senedd Cymru – Welsh Parliament: Carmarthen East and Dinefwr
- List of places UK Wales Carmarthenshire 51.956°N 3.788°W Map of the community

Myddfai (Welsh pronunciation) is a small village and community in Carmarthenshire, Wales. It is situated south of Llandovery in the Brecon Beacons, and has a population of 415, decreasing to 398 at the 2011 census.

The village is a popular tourist destination on the western edge of the Brecon Beacons, famous for the history and heritage of the Physicians of Myddfai and the legend of ‘The Lady of The Lake’ and provides a central location to visit a wide range of interesting places, such as gardens, castles and The Heart of Wales Railway.

The community is bordered by the communities of: Llanddeusant; Llangadog; Llansadwrn; Llanwrda; Llandovery; and Llanfair-ar-y-bryn, all being in Carmarthenshire; and by Llywel in Powys.

== Amenities ==
St Michael's Church, Myddfai is a grade I listed building.

Myddfai Community Hall and Visitor Centre is one of the main attractions in Myddfai with a gift shop offering plenty of art and crafts by local artists and contributors, a café serving hot drinks and homemade cakes and a large hall and meeting room offering facilities for weddings, events and local community events. It is an energy efficient facility in the heart of the village and recognised as one of the most well equipped venues in the area. It was designed and built with funding from the Big Lottery Village SOS Scheme and supported by a wide range of other funders. The story of the Myddfai project and build was followed by the BBC as part of the 'Village SOS' series with presenter Sarah Beeny and was shown on BBC One in August 2011 and was officially opened in June 2011 by Prince Charles and his wife the Duchess of Cornwall.

== Lady of the Lake legend ==
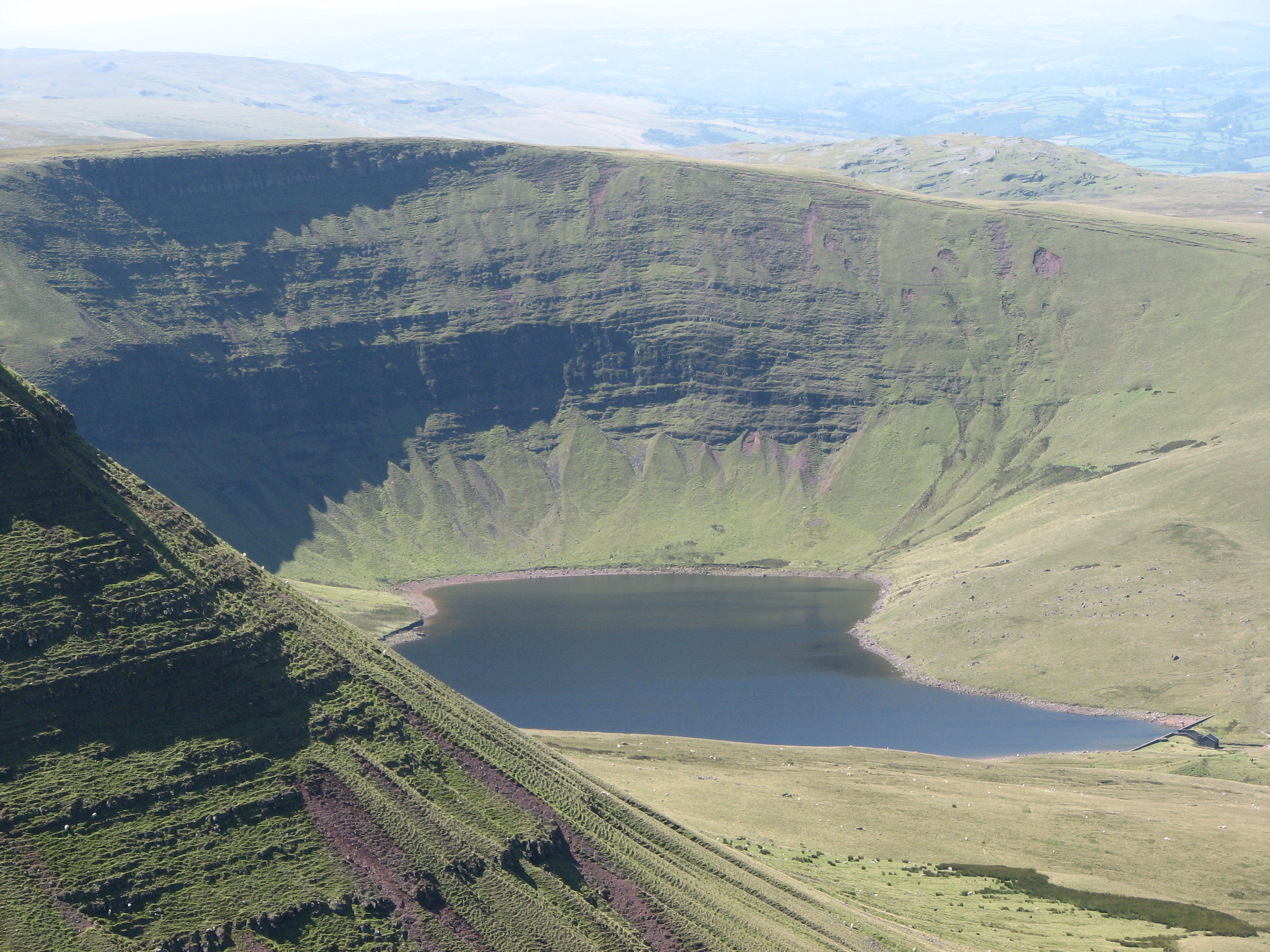
The glacial lake of Llyn y Fan Fach featured in the Lady of the Lake story

The area is the setting for many tales of myth and legend. One such legend is the story of the Lady of the Lake. The story goes that a young farm boy grazing his sheep flock around the lake of Llyn y Fan Fach below the Black Mountain escarpment used to pass the long daylight hours gazing into the dazzling waters of the lake. As he grew up, passing every day this way, one day a beautiful woman emerged from this lake, approached the dumbstruck boy, who was instantly besotted and cast totally under her spell. She was unparalleled in beauty, grace and wisdom and immediately prophesied to him that he would become rich and respected if he would agree to marry her. However this future success and her partnership was dependent on certain conditions. Foremost condition was that he should never strike her more than three times. Secondly that he never speak a word of her origin or the supernatural source of their success and relationship.

The boy very readily agreed and managed to suppress conjecture as to her sudden appearance – no easy feat among a Welsh community. As she forecast, the young boy's flocks gained weight and condition and many healthy lambs were born, including exceptional breed rams, he became an astute negotiator at market, enjoyed haggling, kept his humour and his nerve, he secured excellent deals with older, shrewder farmers, won their gradual respect, expanded his flocks, bought his own land, rented land wisely, developed a skillful eye when buying, built up relationships with trusted peers, supported those coming up behind him, knew intuitively who to trust and whose word to discount, expanded into horse breeding and before many years had passed he was a farmer. A man who was welcome wherever he went, sought out by all. His quiet wife kept in the background and produced beautiful, healthy children, ran the household efficiently and was a constant support to her husband.

For many years the couple were closely in love and they prospered and enabled their wider community to prosper. However like many young men the boy grew complacent, maybe even arrogant on occasions, neglected old friends, old bonds and old values. This resulted in lost revenue, damaged friendships and a resultant backlash of stress, anger and disquiet. On one occasion he struck his wife as she met him from market. She reminded him of his promises to her and the foremost condition of their marriage. He begged her forgiveness, which she readily gave.

However this happened twice more in similar circumstances and on being struck the third time she stood up to her full height, looked him in the eye and stated that their relationship was now over. She simply turned on her heel and walked out of their farm and as she crossed their land every sheep, lamb, cow, calf, hen, chick, duck, goose, pig and horse followed her. She ascended to the lake and wordlessly walked in once more, every animal following her beneath the cold still waters, leaving the man heartbroken in the shallows, his pleas resounding around the mountains arms.

Another version of the tale, as told by Sir John Rhys in his book "Celtic Folklore, Volume 1: Welsh and Manx," shows no worsening of the young man. Instead, the "blows" come to a light blow on the back with a pair of gloves, a warm hand at a wedding when the Lady is crying, and an admonishing hand at a funeral when the Lady is laughing. The story ends in a similar fashion, though, with the Lady calling all of her dowry of animals away with her. It is noted, further: "What became of the affrighted ploughman – whether he was left on the field when the oxen set off, or whether he followed them to the lake, has not been handed down to tradition; neither has the fate of the disconsolate and half-ruined husband been kept in remembrance".

The man returned to his farm unable to work the land, lost in a world of self-reproach and disbelief, a ruined man. His only compensation was his children by his otherworldly wife, who still loved him; they grew up to be the Physicians of Myddfai.

== Llwynywermwd ==
In 2006, Charles III, who at the time was Prince of Wales, started looking for a base for his visits to Wales. Carmarthenshire was seen as a favourite location due to its quiet nature. In late 2006, the Prince via the Duchy of Cornwall made an offer on Llwynywermwd (Llwynywormwood), a former coach house set in the 190-acre (0.77 km^{2}) grounds of a ruined mansion. Contracts were exchanged in November 2006, with Clarence House saying that the property may be let to holidaymakers when the Prince and his wife, now Queen Camilla, were not there. The King made his first official visit on 16 March 2007.

== See also ==
- Gwragedd Annwn
