= Ffairfach =

Village in Carmarthenshire, Wales

Coordinates: 51.875°N 3.994°W

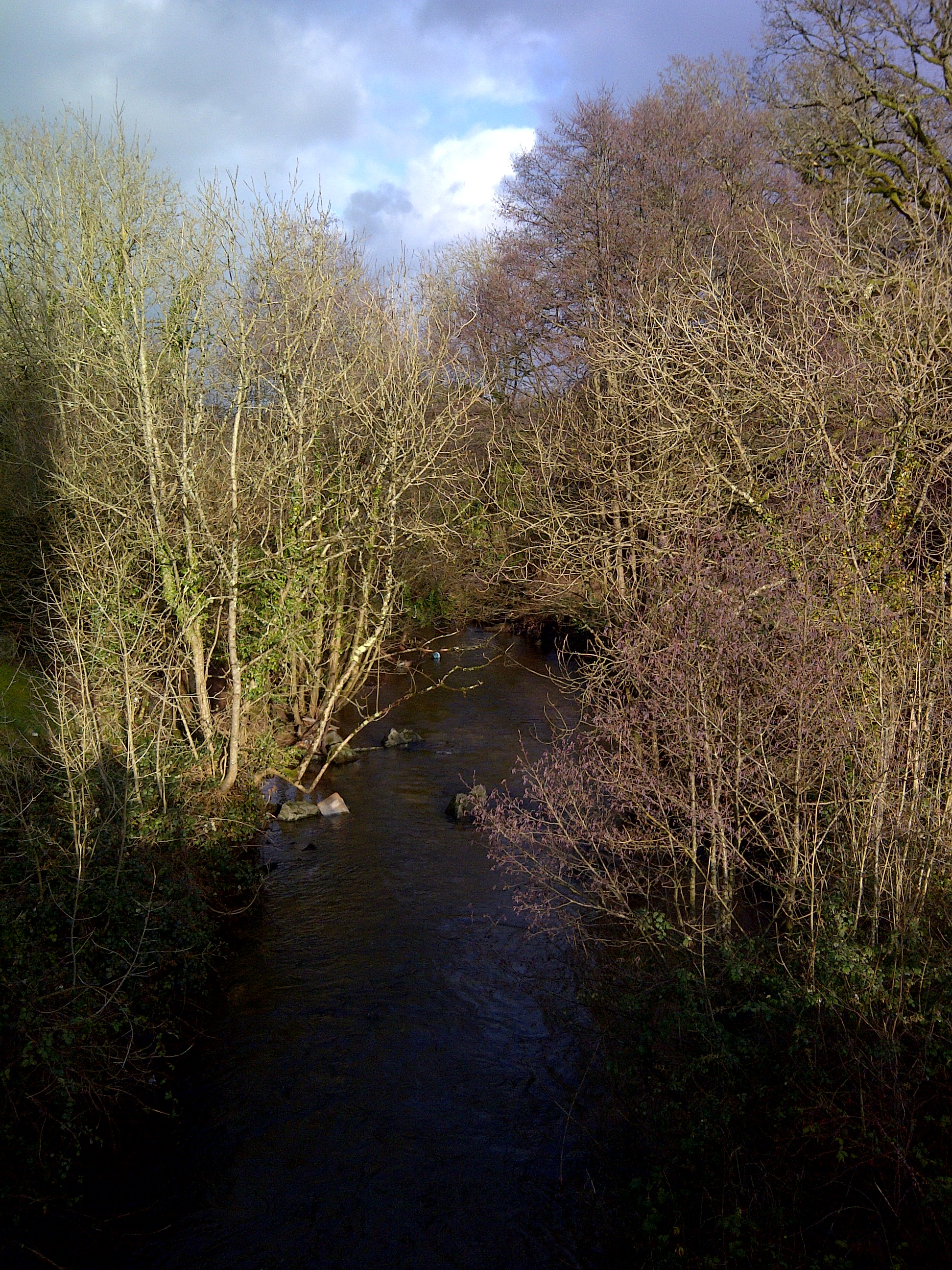

- Location within Carmarthenshire
- Community: Dyffryn Cennen
- Principal area: Carmarthenshire
- Preserved county: Dyfed
- Country: Wales
- Sovereign state: United Kingdom
- Police: Dyfed-Powys
- Fire: Mid and West Wales
- Ambulance: Welsh
- UK Parliament: Caerfyrddin
- Senedd Cymru – Welsh Parliament: Carmarthen East and Dinefwr

Ffairfach is a village one-half mile (0.80 km) south of the market town of Llandeilo in the eastern part of Carmarthenshire, Wales. It is close to the confluence of the Afon Cennen and the River Towy. Population is 516 according to 2017 census.

== Etymology ==
The Welsh name for the village is Ffair-fach signifying 'little fair'. In the early 17th century it was recorded as Ffair fach yn Llandilo. The 'large fair' took place in neighbouring Llandeilo. It was reportedly formerly known as Abercennen.

== History ==
In the early 19th century, Ffairfach was a fair sized village of about three dozen houses. It had a corn mill and a village inn, The Torbay Inn, which doubled as a blacksmiths.

Two fairs were held each year, one on 5 May and a cattle fair on 22 November.

The Union Poor House was built about 1839.

The stone used to build the nearby Llandeilo Bridge (1848) was excavated from a quarry near the signal box at the side of the railway and immediately below Rock Villa at Ffairfach, after satisfactory tests for quality.

The British School was established in 1858 near the Torbay Inn. The first schoolmaster was Mr. David Morgan, who later wrote The Story of Carmarthenshire (1908). The council school was built about 1899.

A gas works were erected about 1860.

== Railway ==
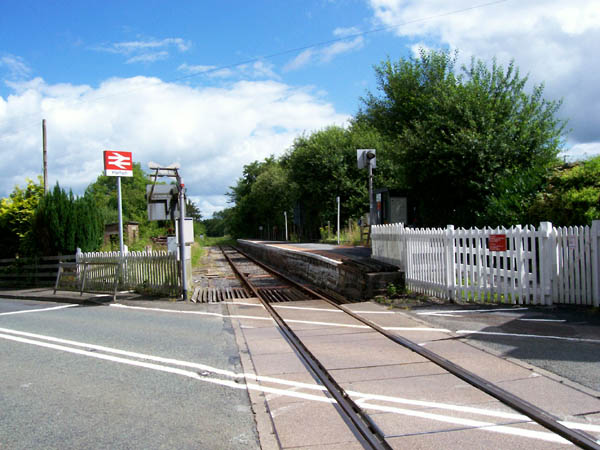
Ffairfach railway station

Ffairfach railway station lies on the Heart of Wales Line which runs between Shrewsbury and Swansea. Ffairfach boasted two railway stations within 300 yards of each other, and a third station at Llandeilo was only a mile or so away. Passengers from the Amman Valley and Carmarthen usually alighted at the Ffairfach stations, as they would save 1 1/2 pence on the return fare, which meant a great deal in those days. Also the distance from Llandeilo station to the church square was almost as far as it would be if they walked from Ffairfach.

Three-quarters of the commerce of the town of Llandeilo at this time came from the south of the Tywi bridge; consequently Ffairfach became important, for rail and road passengers made use of the village as the first stopping place en route for Llandeilo.

The first railway through Ffairfach was built by the Llanelli Dock Railway (Llanelli to Llandovery) in 1856. The second was built by the London North Western in 1865 Carmarthen to Llandeilo through the beautiful vale of the Tywi. The name of the station was Llandeilo Bridge.

== Education ==
=== Ysgol Gynradd Ffairfach ===
The village primary school was built in 1858. According to the latest Estyn report, there are 106 pupils on roll, including 14 full-time nursery age pupils. The school is categorised as a Welsh-medium school, with 37% of pupils coming from Welsh-speaking homes.

== Religion ==
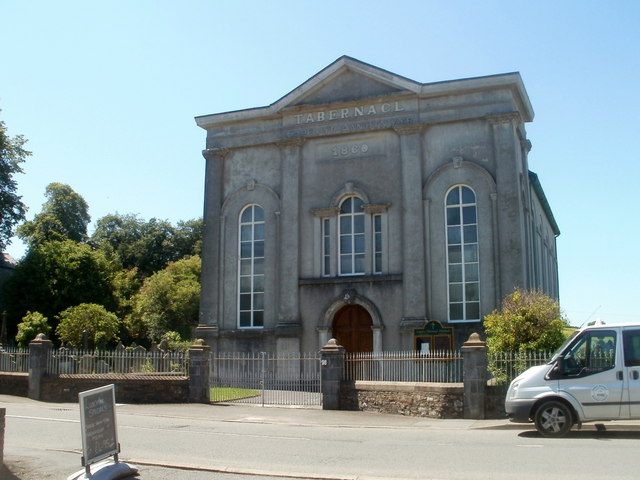
Capel Tabernacl

Capel Tabernacl in Heol Cennen is an Independent chapel dating from 1860, designed by the architect Thomas Thomas. It replaced an earlier chapel on the site built in 1817 and 1840. The chapel is a Grade II listed building.

== Pubs ==
- The Torbay Inn
- The Tregib Arms – an early to mid 19th century building, a Grade II listed building
