= Talybont-on-Usk =

Village and community in Powys, Wales

Talybont-on-Usk: Welsh: Tal-y-bont ar Wysg
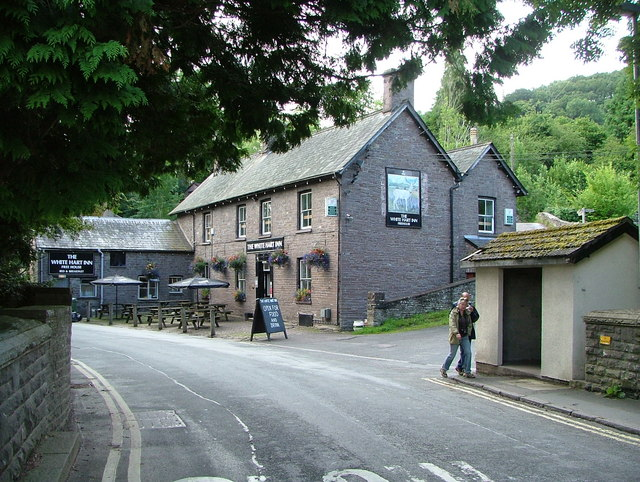
- The White Hart Inn

- Location within Powys
- Population: 719 (2011)
- OS grid reference: SO111226
- Community: Talybont-on-Usk
- Principal area: Powys
- Preserved county: Powys
- Country: Wales
- Sovereign state: United Kingdom
- Post town: BRECON
- Postcode district: LD3
- Dialling code: 01874
- Police: Dyfed-Powys
- Fire: Mid and West Wales
- Ambulance: Welsh
- UK Parliament: Brecon, Radnor and Cwm Tawe
- Senedd Cymru – Welsh Parliament: Brecon & Radnorshire
- List of places UK Wales Powys 51.896°N 3.290°W Community map: Map of the community

Talybont-on-Usk (Welsh: Tal-y-bont ar Wysg) is a village and community in Powys, Wales, in the historic county of Brecknockshire. It lies on both the Caerfanell river and the Monmouthshire and Brecon Canal, about 1 mile (1.6 km) from the River Usk. In 2001, it had a population of 743, reducing to 719 at the 2011 census. The community includes the settlements of Llansantffraed, Scethrog, Aber Village, and Pencelli.

== History ==
Allt yr Esgair is a steep-sided hill to the north east of Talybont, and has an Iron Age settlement on the summit. There are other Iron Age and Bronze Age sites in the vicinity, and a Roman road flanks the slopes of Allt yr Esgair. A small castle was built at Pencelli during the Norman invasion, and this was later replaced by the sixteenth century Pencelli House. The canal was built around 1800 to transport lime, coal and iron to Newport. There are some lime kilns to the east of the village, and a tramroad was built to transport limestone from the crags above.

The language of Talybont (and Crickhowell and Llangynidr) was originally Welsh. In his 1893 book Wales and her language, John E Southall, reports that over 60% of the population of the area spoke Welsh, although the town was only a few miles from more anglicised Abergavenny. Gravestones with Welsh inscriptions are found in and just outside Talybont.

== The village ==
The village is located on the B4558 road about 6 mi (9.7 km) southeast of Brecon and 8 mi (13 km) northwest of Crickhowell. It is a mile from the River Usk and on the Monmouthshire and Brecon Canal and is connected to the A40 trunk road on the other side of the Usk by a short section of unclassified road. The village has a shop and several pubs. The valley one mile south of the village is dammed to form the Talybont Reservoir. This has a 380 metres (1,250 ft) dam and there are forest trails in its vicinity. Talybont-on-Usk is a popular place for walkers and offers the Henry Vaughan walk through the nearby countryside where the 18th century poet once lived. Another walk can be followed along the line of the former Brinore Tramroad which runs south from the canalside wharf in the village around the western flanks of Y Wenallt and Tor y Foel before heading to Trefil via the head of the Dyffryn Crawnon valley.

== Governance ==
The Talybont-on-Usk electoral ward covers Talybont-on Usk and the neighbouring communities of Glyn Tarell and Llanfrynach. The population of this ward at the 2011 census was 1,923. It elects one councillor to Powys County Council. As of 2022, the current councillor is Anita Cartwright of the Welsh Liberal Democrats.

Talybont-on-Usk Community Council represents the community at the local level. Up to nine community councillors are elected or co-opted to the council.

== Notable residents ==
- Fred Miller (born 1873; date of death unknown), Welsh international rugby player, born in Talybont-on-Usk
- David Lewis, 1st Baron Brecon, (1905–1976), a Welsh businessman and Conservative politician
- Roland Mathias (1915–2007), poet and short story writer.
- Patrick Duff (born 1966), singer-songwriter, wrote much of the Strangelove album Love and Other Demons whilst living in a cottage just outside the village

== Tourism ==
In 2014, it was the venue for the Linux Bier Wanderung.
