= List of United Kingdom locations: Llano-Lly =

The United Kingdom

This is part of the list of United Kingdom locations: a gazetteer of place names in the United Kingdom showing each place's locality and geographical coordinates.

== Llan (continued) ==
=== Llano–Llanr ===
Location	Locality	Coordinates (links to map & photo sources)	OS grid reference
Llanon	Ceredigion	52.282°N 04.177°W	SN516671
Llanon	Pembrokeshire	51.93°N 05.15°W	SM8331
Llanover	Monmouthshire	51.76°N 03.00°W	SO3108
Llanpumsaint	Carmarthenshire	51.93°N 04.31°W	SN4129
Llanreath	Pembrokeshire	51.68°N 04.96°W	SM9503
Llanrhaeadr-ym-Mochnant	Powys	52.82°N 03.30°W	SJ1226
Llanrhaeadr-yng-Nghinmeirch	Denbighshire	53.15°N 03.37°W	SJ0863
Llanrhian	Pembrokeshire	51.93°N 05.18°W	SM8131
Llanrhidian	Swansea	51.60°N 04.18°W	SS4992
Llanrhos	Conwy	53.30°N 03.81°W	SH7980
Llanrhyddlad	Isle of Anglesey	53.37°N 04.51°W	SH3389
Llanrhystud	Ceredigion	52.29°N 04.15°W	SN5369
Llanrug	Gwynedd	53.14°N 04.19°W	SH5363
Llanrumney	Cardiff	51.51°N 03.12°W	ST2280
Llanrwst	Conwy	53.13°N 03.79°W	SH8061

=== Llans ===
Location	Locality	Coordinates (links to map & photo sources)	OS grid reference
Llansadurnen	Carmarthenshire	51.76°N 04.49°W	SN2810
Llansadwrn	Carmarthenshire	51.96°N 03.90°W	SN6931
Llansadwrn	Isle of Anglesey	53.26°N 04.16°W	SH5676
Llansaint	Carmarthenshire	51.74°N 04.34°W	SN3808
Llansamlet	Swansea	51.65°N 03.90°W	SS6897
Llansanffraid Glan Conwy	Conwy	53.25°N 03.80°W	SH8075
Llansannan	Conwy	53.17°N 03.60°W	SH9365
Llansannor	The Vale Of Glamorgan	51.48°N 03.45°W	SS9977
Llansantffraed (or Llansantffraid)	Ceredigion	52.28°N 04.18°W	SN5167
Llansantffraed	Powys	51.89°N 03.28°W	SO1223
Llansantffraed-Cwmdeuddwr	Powys	52.29°N 03.52°W	SN9667
Llansantffraed-in-Elwel	Powys	52.17°N 03.33°W	SO0954
Llansantffraid-ym-Mechain	Powys	52.77°N 03.17°W	SJ2120
Llansawel	Carmarthenshire	52.00°N 04.02°W	SN6136
Llansilin	Powys	52.84°N 03.18°W	SJ2028
Llansoy	Monmouthshire	51.71°N 02.81°W	SO4402
Llanspyddid	Powys	51.94°N 03.44°W	SO0128
Llanstadwell	Pembrokeshire	51.70°N 04.98°W	SM9405
Llansteffan	Carmarthenshire	51.76°N 04.39°W	SN3510
Llanstephan	Powys	52.06°N 03.28°W	SO1242

=== Llant ===
Location	Locality	Coordinates (links to map & photo sources)	OS grid reference
Llantarnam	Torfaen	51.63°N 03.01°W	ST3093
Llanteems	Monmouthshire	51.87°N 02.97°W	SO3320
Llanteg	Pembrokeshire	51.75°N 04.63°W	SN1810
Llanthony	Monmouthshire	51.93°N 03.04°W	SO2827
Llantilio Crossenny	Monmouthshire	51.82°N 02.88°W	SO3914
Llantilio Pertholey	Monmouthshire	51.83°N 03.00°W	SO3116
Llantrisant	Monmouthshire	51.65°N 02.88°W	ST3996
Llantrisant	Rhondda, Cynon, Taff	51.53°N 03.38°W	ST0483
Llantrisant	Isle of Anglesey	53.31°N 04.46°W	SH3683
Llantrithyd	The Vale Of Glamorgan	51.43°N 03.38°W	ST0472
Llantwit	Neath Port Talbot	51.65°N 03.79°W	SS7697
Llantwit Fardre	Rhondda, Cynon, Taff	51.54°N 03.34°W	ST0784
Llantwit Major	The Vale Of Glamorgan	51.40°N 03.48°W	SS9768

=== Llanu–Llanv ===
Location	Locality	Coordinates (links to map & photo sources)	OS grid reference
Llanuwchllyn	Gwynedd	52.85°N 03.67°W	SH8730
Llanvaches	Monmouthshire	51.61°N 02.82°W	ST4391
Llanvair-Discoed	City of Newport	51.62°N 02.81°W	ST4492
Llanvapley	Monmouthshire	51.82°N 02.93°W	SO3614
Llanvetherine	Monmouthshire	51.84°N 02.93°W	SO3617
Llanveynoe	Herefordshire	51.97°N 03.02°W	SO3031
Llanvihangel Crucorney	Monmouthshire	51.87°N 02.98°W	SO3220
Llanvihangel Gobion	Monmouthshire	51.77°N 02.95°W	SO3409
Llanvihangel-Ystern-Llewern	Monmouthshire	51.81°N 02.82°W	SO4313

=== Llanw ===
Location	Locality	Coordinates (links to map & photo sources)	OS grid reference
Llanwarne	Herefordshire	51.94°N 02.72°W	SO5028
Llanwddyn	Powys	52.76°N 03.45°W	SJ0219
Llanwenarth	Monmouthshire	51.82°N 03.06°W	SO2714
Llanwenog	Ceredigion	52.08°N 04.20°W	SN4945
Llanwern	City of Newport	51.58°N 02.92°W	ST3688
Llanwinio	Carmarthenshire	51.90°N 04.53°W	SN2626
Llanwnda	Pembrokeshire	52.01°N 05.01°W	SM9339
Llanwnda	Gwynedd	53.09°N 04.28°W	SH4758
Llanwnnen	Ceredigion	52.10°N 04.14°W	SN5347
Llanwnog	Powys	52.52°N 03.44°W	SO0293
Llanwrda	Carmarthenshire	51.96°N 03.87°W	SN7131
Llanwrin	Powys	52.61°N 03.80°W	SH7803
Llanwrthwl	Powys	52.25°N 03.51°W	SN9763
Llanwrtyd	Powys	52.10°N 03.66°W	SN8647
Llanwrtyd Wells	Powys	52.10°N 03.65°W	SN8746
Llanwyddelan	Powys	52.59°N 03.37°W	SJ0701

=== Llany ===
Location	Locality	Coordinates (links to map & photo sources)	OS grid reference
Llanyblodwel	Shropshire	52.79°N 03.12°W	SJ2422
Llanybri	Carmarthenshire	51.78°N 04.42°W	SN3312
Llanybydder	Carmarthenshire	52.07°N 04.16°W	SN5244
Llanycefn	Pembrokeshire	51.87°N 04.77°W	SN0923
Llanychaer	Pembrokeshire	51.97°N 04.94°W	SM9835
Llanycil	Gwynedd	52.89°N 03.62°W	SH9134
Llandyfaelog	Carmarthenshire	51.77°N 04.30°W	SN4111
Llanymawddwy	Gwynedd	52.75°N 03.63°W	SH9019
Llanymddyfri	Carmarthenshire	51.99°N 03.80°W	SN7634
Llanymynech	Powys	52.77°N 03.09°W	SJ2620
Llanynghenedl	Isle of Anglesey	53.29°N 04.53°W	SH3181
Llanynys	Denbighshire	53.14°N 03.34°W	SJ1062
Llan-y-pwll	Wrexham	53.05°N 02.94°W	SJ3751
Llanyrafon	Torfaen	51.64°N 03.01°W	ST3094
Llanyre	Powys	52.24°N 03.40°W	SO0462
Llanystumdwy	Gwynedd	52.91°N 04.27°W	SH4738
Llanywern	Powys	51.94°N 03.31°W	SO1028

== Llaw–Llaz ==
Location	Locality	Coordinates (links to map & photo sources)	OS grid reference
Llawhaden	Pembrokeshire	51.81°N 04.81°W	SN0617
Llawnt	Shropshire	52.86°N 03.13°W	SJ2430
Llawryglyn	Powys	52.50°N 03.57°W	SN9391
Llay	Wrexham	53.08°N 03.00°W	SJ3355

== Lle–Lly ==
Location	Locality	Coordinates (links to map & photo sources)	OS grid reference
Llechcynfarwy	Isle of Anglesey	53.30°N 04.43°W	SH3881
Llecheiddior	Gwynedd	52.96°N 04.27°W	SH4743
Llechfaen	Powys	51.94°N 03.33°W	SO0828
Llechfraith	Gwynedd	52.75°N 03.98°W	SH6619
Llechryd	Ceredigion	52.05°N 04.61°W	SN2143
Llechryd	Caerphilly	51.77°N 03.30°W	SO1009
Llechwedd	Conwy	53.26°N 03.86°W	SH7676
Lledrod	Ceredigion	52.31°N 03.99°W	SN6470
Llettyrychen	Carmarthenshire	51.68°N 04.24°W	SN4501
Llidiardau	Gwynedd	52.92°N 03.68°W	SH8738
Llidiart-y-Parc	Denbighshire	52.97°N 03.32°W	SJ1143
Llithfaen	Gwynedd	52.95°N 04.45°W	SH3543
Lloc	Flintshire	53.27°N 03.29°W	SJ1476
Llong	Flintshire	53.15°N 03.10°W	SJ2662
Llowes	Powys	52.06°N 03.18°W	SO1941
Lloyney	Powys	52.36°N 03.11°W	SO2475
Llugwy	Gwynedd	52.57°N 03.90°W	SN7199
Llundain-fach	Ceredigion	52.18°N 04.12°W	SN5556
Llwydarth	Bridgend	51.59°N 03.66°W	SS8590
Llwydcoed	Rhondda, Cynon, Taff	51.72°N 03.46°W	SN9904
Llwyn	Shropshire	52.41°N 03.06°W	SO2880
Llwyn	Denbighshire	53.16°N 03.37°W	SJ0864
Llwyncelyn	Ceredigion	52.20°N 04.28°W	SN4459
Llwyndafydd	Ceredigion	52.16°N 04.38°W	SN3755
Llwyn-derw	Powys	52.44°N 03.60°W	SN9184
Llwyn-du	Monmouthshire	51.83°N 03.04°W	SO2816
Llwynduris	Pembrokeshire	52.05°N 04.58°W	SN2343
Llwyndyrys	Gwynedd	52.94°N 04.42°W	SH3741
Llwyneinion	Wrexham	53.01°N 03.07°W	SJ2847
Llwyngwril	Gwynedd	52.66°N 04.08°W	SH5909
Llwynhendy	Carmarthenshire	51.67°N 04.11°W	SS5499
Llwynmawr	Wrexham	52.92°N 03.16°W	SJ2237
Llwyn-on Village	Rhondda, Cynon, Taff	51.78°N 03.43°W	SO0111
Llwyn-teg	Carmarthenshire	51.75°N 04.10°W	SN5508
Llwyn-y-brain	Pembrokeshire	51.80°N 04.62°W	SN1915
Llwyn-y-go	Shropshire	52.78°N 03.02°W	SJ3121
Llwynygog	Powys	52.51°N 03.66°W	SN8792
Llwyn-y-groes	Ceredigion	52.18°N 04.06°W	SN5956
Llwynypia	Rhondda, Cynon, Taff	51.62°N 03.46°W	SS9993
Llwyn-yr-hwrdd	Pembrokeshire	51.95°N 04.59°W	SN2232
Llynclys	Shropshire	52.80°N 03.06°W	SJ2823
Llynfaes	Isle of Anglesey	53.27°N 04.40°W	SH4078
Llysfaen	Conwy	53.27°N 03.68°W	SH8877
Llyswen	Powys	52.02°N 03.26°W	SO1337
Llysworney	The Vale Of Glamorgan	51.45°N 03.49°W	SS9674
Llys-y-frân	Pembrokeshire	51.88°N 04.84°W	SN0424
Llywel	Powys	51.95°N 03.64°W	SN8730
Llywernog	Ceredigion	52.40°N 03.86°W	SN7380
