= List of Sites of Special Scientific Interest in Powys =

Map of Powys within Wales

This is a list of the Sites of Special Scientific Interest (SSSIs) in the Powys Area of Search (AoS).

== Sites ==
- Abercriban Quarries
- Aberithon and Bedw Turbaries
- Afon Dyfi ger Mallwyd
- Afon Irfon
- Afon Llynfi
- Afon Wysg (Isafonydd) - River Usk (Tributaries)
- Alexanderstone Meadows
- Allt Cynhelyg
- Allt y Main Mine
- Allt-y-gest
- Bach Howey Gorge
- Bach-y-graig Stream Section
- Baltic and Tyle'r-bont Quarries
- Banc Hirllwyn
- Berwyn
- Black Mountains
- Blaen Cilieni
- Blaen Nedd
- Blaen-y-cwm Wood
- Brechfa Pool
- Brecon Beacons
- Breidden Hill
- Brithdir a Chwm Mawr
- Bron-y-Buckley Wood
- Bryn Coch
- Bryn-bwch
- Bryngwyn Hall Stables and Coach House
- Buckland Coach House and Ice House
- Burfa Boglands
- Caban Lakeside Woodlands
- Cae Aber-Glanhirin
- Cae Bryn-tywarch
- Cae Coed-gleision
- Cae Comin Coch
- Cae Cwm-bach
- Cae Cwm-rhocas (Cwm Roches Meadow)
- Cae Gwernllertai
- Cae Henfron
- Cae Llety-yr-efail
- Cae Llwyn
- Cae Penmaes
- Cae Pwll-y-bo
- Caeau Bronydd-mawr
- Caeau Bryn-du
- Caeau Clochfaen-Isaf (Clochfaen-isaf Fields)
- Caeau Cnwch a Tyn y Graig
- Caeau Coed Mawr (Coedmawr Fields)
- Caeau Cwmcoynant
- Caeau Cwm-ffrwd
- Caeau Glyn (Glyn Fields)
- Caeau Hirnant
- Caeau Llwyn Gwrgan
- Caeau Nant y Llechau
- Caeau Penglaneinon
- Caeau Ton-y-fildre
- Caeau Ty-mawr
- Caeau Tyn-llwyni
- Caeau Wern
- Carn Gafallt
- Cathedine Common Wood
- Cerrig-gwalch
- Ceunant Twymyn
- Cilcenni Dingle
- Ciliau
- Coed Aberdulas
- Coed Aberedw
- Coed Afon Crewi
- Coed Blaen-y-cwm (Blaen-y-cwm Wood)
- Coed Bryn-Person
- Coed Byrwydd
- Coed Copir Graig
- Coed Craig-iar
- Coed Dyrysiog
- Coed Hafod-fraith
- Coed Maesmawr-Coed Esgairneiriau-Cheunant Caecenau
- Coed Mawr
- Coed Mawr – Blaen-Car
- Coed Nant Menascin
- Coed Pentre (Pentre Wood)
- Coed Ty-mawr
- Coed y Cefn
- Coed y Ciliau
- Coed y Lawnt a Coed Oli
- Coed Ynys-Faen
- Coed yr Allt
- Coed yr Allt-goch
- Coed-mawr Quarry
- Coedydd Glannau a Cwm Coel
- Coedydd Llawr-y-glyn
- Coedydd y Beili, Malgwyn a Cribin
- Colwyn Brook Marshes (North & South)
- Corndon Hill
- Cors Caer Neuadd
- Cors Cefn Llwyd
- Cors Farchwel
- Cors Lawnt
- Cors Llanllugan (Llanllugan Mire)
- Cors Llyn Coethlyn
- Cors Ty-gwyn
- Cors Ty-Llwyd
- Cors Y Llyn
- Corsydd Llanbrynmair (Llanbrynmair Moors)
- Crabtree Green Meadow
- Craig y Rhiwarth
- Cwar yr Ystrad a Cwar Blaen dyffryn
- Cwm Craig-ddu Quarry
- Cwm Gwynllyn
- Cwm Llyfnant
- Cwm Twrch
- Cwm-gwanon Dingle and Pasture
- Cwmsaise
- Dolyhir Meadows
- Dolyhir Quarry
- Drostre Bank
- Duhonw
- Dyffrynoedd Nedd a Mellte a Moel Penderyn
- Dyfi
- Dylife Mine
- Elenydd
- Erwood Dingle
- Far Hall Meadow
- Ffridd Mathrafal Track Section
- Garth Bank Quarry
- Garth-eryr
- Glascwm and Gladestry Hills
- Gorsllwyn, Onllwyn
- Graig Fawr
- Granllyn
- Gregynog
- Gungrog Flash
- Gwaith Brics Buttington (Buttington Brickworks)
- Gwaun Bryn (Bryn Pasture)
- Gwaun Bwlch Hafod-y-gog
- Gwaun Cilgwyn
- Gwaun Efail Wig
- Gwaun Efail-Llwydiarth
- Gwaun Llan (Llan Pastures)
- Gwaun Llwyn-gwyn
- Gwaun Wern-y-wig
- Gwernaffel Dingle
- Gwern-y-brain Dingle
- Gwern-yfed-fach Quarry
- Gweunydd Camnant
- Gweunydd Ceunant
- Gweunydd Coch-y-dwst
- Gweunydd Crychell
- Gweunydd Dolwen
- Gweunydd Dwfnant
- Gweunydd Dyffryn Nedd
- Gweunydd Dyfnant (Dyfnant Pastures)
- Gweunydd Esgairdraenllwyn
- Gweunydd ger Fronhaul
- Gweunydd Llechwedd-newydd
- Gweunydd Nant y Dernol
- Gweunydd Penstrowed (Penstrowed Pastures)
- Gweunydd Pen-y-coed (Pen-y-coed Pastures)
- Gweunydd Ty-brith (Ty-brith Meadows)
- Gweunydd Tyn y Llidiart
- Gyfartha
- Halfway Quarry
- Hen-Allt Common
- Hendre, Llangedwyn
- Heol Senni Quarry
- Hillington Pastures
- Hollybush Pastures
- Howey Brook Stream Section
- Illtyd Pools
- Ithon Valley Woodlands
- Kingswood Meadow
- Lake Wood, Llandrindod Wells
- Leighton Bat Roosts
- Llan Bwch-llyn Lake
- Llandeilo, Rhulen and Llanbedr Hills
- Llanelwedd Rocks
- Llanfawr Quarries, Llandrindod Wells
- Llangammarch Wells Quarry
- Llanymynech and Llynclys Hills
- Llofft-y-bardd
- Llwyn-Cus
- Llymwynt Brook Pastures
- Llyn Mawr
- Llyn Syfaddan (Llangorse Lake)
- Lower Caerfaelog Pastures
- Lower Garth Meadows
- Maelienydd
- Marcheini Uplands, Gilfach Farm and Gamallt
- Mawnog Gwaunynog
- Mochdre Dingles
- Moel y Golfa
- Moity and Garth Dingles and Fron Wood
- Montgomery Canal
- Moorlands Pastures
- Mwyngloddfa Ceulan
- Mwyngloddfa Nantiago
- Mynydd Du (Black Mountain)
- Mynydd Epynt
- Mynydd Llangatwg (Mynydd Llangattock)
- Nant Clydach Pastures
- Nant Llech
- Nant y Rhos
- Neuadd and Tylelo Mires
- New Castle Meadows
- New House Meadow
- Newmead
- Ogof Ffynnon Ddu
- Ogof Ffynnon Ddu-Pant Mawr
- Pen Common, Llanbedr
- Pen-cerrig Stream Section
- Pencreigiaur Llan
- Pen-Dugwm Woods
- Penllwyn-yr-Hendy
- Penstrowed Quarry
- Pentregwyn
- Pentrosfa Mire
- Penygarnedd Mine
- Pen-yr-hen-Allt
- Pistyll Rhaeadr
- Plas-y-Gors
- Pumlumon (Plynlimon)
- Pwll-y-wrach
- Radnor Forest
- Rhagnentydd Gwy Uchaf - Upper Wye Tributaries
- Rhos Dwfnant
- Rhos Goch (Rhos Goch Common)
- Rhos Hen-Glyn-Isaf
- Rhos Pant-tyle
- Rhos Penrhiw
- Rhos Rhyd-y-ceir
- Rhos yr Hafod
- Rhosydd Llanwrthwl
- Rhosydd Nant Eithrim
- Rhosydd Nant-yr-henfron
- River Ithon
- River Lugg
- River Teme
- River Usk (Upper Usk) - Afon Wysg (Wysg Uchaf)
- River Wye - Lower Wye - Afon Gwy - Gwy Isaf
- River Wye (Tributaries) - Afon Gwy (Isafonydd)
- River Wye (Upper Wye) - Afon Gwy (Gwy Uchaf)
- Roundton Hill
- Spy Wood and Aldress Dingle
- Stanner Rocks
- Talybont Reservoir
- The Wern, Rhosgoch
- Trecoed-Castle Crab
- Trewern Brook
- Troed Rhiw Drain Meadows
- Twenty-five Acre Wood
- Tyncoed Pasture
- Upper Chapel Pastures
- Upper Nantserth Pasture
- Vicarage Meadows
- Waen Rydd
- Waun Cwm Calch
- Waun Ton-y-spyddaden
- Waun-Ddu
- West Llangynog Slate Mine
- White Grit Meadows
- Y Gors
