= B4558 road =

Road in Powys, Wales

B4558

Route information
- Length: 30.5 mi (49.1 km)

Major junctions
- Southeast end: A4077 road near Crickhowell
- Northwest end: A40 road near Groesffordd

Location
- Country: United Kingdom

Road network
- Roads in the United Kingdom; Motorways; A and B road zones

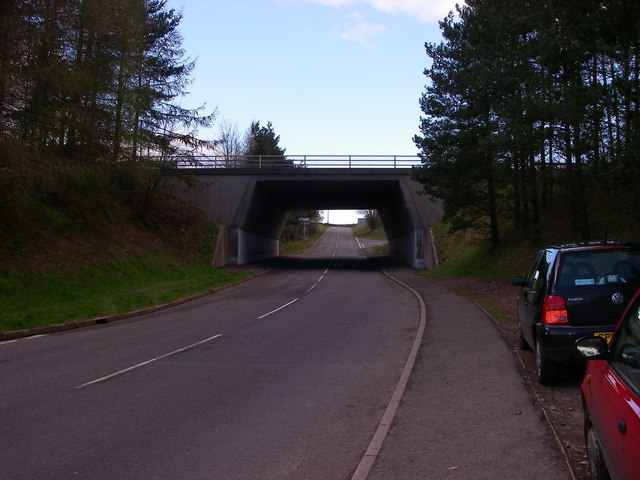
A40 overbridge at Groesffordd In stark contrast to the imposing historic bridges carrying the road and canal over the River Usk (behind the photographer) the modern A40 dual carriageway is carried over the B4558 in functional style.

The B4558 road is a road in Powys, central Wales, with a total length of 12 miles (19 km). It begins at a junction with the A4077 road across the Usk bridge from Crickhowell and runs northwest up the southern side of the Usk valley to a junction with the A40 road 3.5 km east of Brecon. En route from Crickhowell it passes through the villages of Llangynidr, Talybont-on-Usk, and Pencelli. It is closely followed over this section by the Monmouthshire and Brecon Canal which it crosses six times. River crossings include those of the Nant Cleisfer and Afon Crawnon at Llangynidr, the Caerfanell at Talybont and the Nant Menasgin between Pencelli and Llanfrynach. It crosses the Usk itself by the historic Lock Bridge just south of the village of Groesffordd, east of Brecon.
