= Drostre Bank =

Protected area in Powys, Wales

- Site of Special Scientific Interest
- Location within Powys
- Location of Drostre Bank.
- Area of search: Wales
- Coordinates: 51.971944°N 3.315°W

Drostre Bank is an area near Brecon, Powys, Wales, that consists largely of grass and woodland. The area was designated a Site of Special Scientific Interest in 2014. The remains of a small Iron Age hillfort are located on the site, near the village of Llanfilo.

== Geography ==
Drostre Bank is an area measuring around 12.58 hectares (31.1 acres) in Brecknock. The site has been grazed by local farmlife since the 1970s, although Natural Resources Wales estimate that it may have started several decades earlier. The woodland area is located between the villages of Llanfilo and Llechfaen.

The Joint Nature Conservation Committee lists around 56% of the area as being made up of deciduous woodland. Around 37% is listed as humid grassland with the remaking area being made up of small percentages of dry grassland and water-based areas such as marshes, bogs and vegetation. In 2014, the site was listed as a Special Area of Conservation under the European Union's Habitats Directive. The primary reason for the area's listing was the areas containing molinia caerulea, known as purple-moor grass, that provides habitat for wildlife. Drostre Bank had previously been listed as a Site of Community Importance in 1995.

A small, Iron Age-era hillfort is located on the site, measuring around 0.65 hectares (1.6 acres). It is located around 2.5 km (1.6 mi) southwest of the village of Llanfilo. The hillfort is largely derelict with the western side having been overcome by vegetation. The eastern side of the fort maintains a small portion of the outer wall.

== See also ==
- List of Sites of Special Scientific Interest in Brecknock
