= Trefor, Gwynedd =

Coordinates: 52.993°N 4.426°W

Trefor
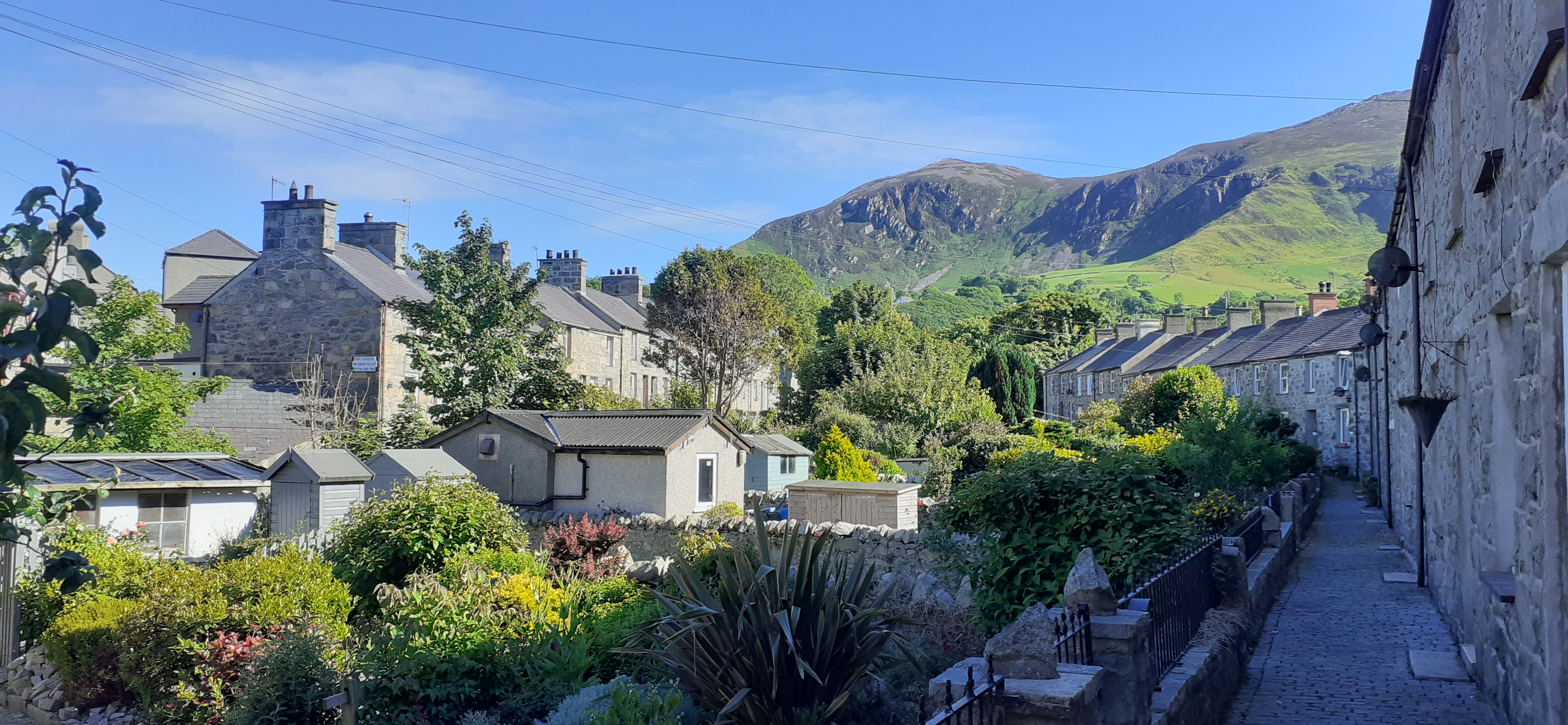
- Stryd Galch (Lime Street)

- Location within Gwynedd
- Population: 1,067
- OS grid reference: SH371467
- Community: Trefor a Llanaelhaearn
- Principal area: Gwynedd
- Country: Wales
- Sovereign state: United Kingdom
- Post town: CAERNARFON
- Postcode district: LL54
- Dialling code: 01286
- Police: North Wales
- Fire: North Wales
- Ambulance: Welsh
- UK Parliament: Dwyfor Meirionnydd
- Senedd Cymru – Welsh Parliament: Dwyfor Meirionnydd

Trefor is a village on the northern coast of the Llŷn Peninsula, in Gwynedd, Wales. It had a population of 1,067 at the 2021 Census. Trefor is in the community of Trefor a Llanaelhaearn, and Llithfaen is nearby. There is a beach in Trefor and also a shop in the village centre. It was in the historic county of Caernarfonshire.

== Location and amenities ==
Trefor is 9 miles (14 km) north of Pwllheli and 13 miles (21 km) south of Caernarfon. It is surrounded by the sea and mountains, overlooking Caernarfon Bay.

Just off the main A499 road, Trefor has a small harbour and a beach with some sand. At the top of the beach is an emergency telephone to summon help in the event of a maritime emergency. The land behind the beach is made of boulder clay deposited during the last glaciation, and is being slowly eroded by the sea. Because of this land erosion, a large expanse of clay is exposed when the tide is out which is dangerous to walk on.

Rising steeply behind the village is Yr Eifl, a range of three hills that dominate the skyline. A granite quarry, known to the locals as Y Gwaith Mawr ("the large works"), Trefor Granite Quarry or the Yr Eifl Quarry, opened in 1850. The industrial narrow-gauge railway—Trefor Quarry railway—opened in 1865 and brought mined and refined rock from the quarry to the pier on the coast. From here it was transported via a conveyor belt onto ships, but the railway was gradually replaced by road transport. Large-scale industry ended with its closure in 1960, after which began the clean up: many of the buildings were demolished, rubble was either discarded beside the roads or/and buried, and the majority of the rail tracks were removed and reused as fence and gate posts, which can still be seen around the village. The rare properties of the granite within the quarry made it the perfect material to produce curling stones for the winter Olympics. Trefor is one of only two locations where this particular granite is found (the other being Ailsa Craig in Scotland).

Tre'r Ceiri, the second highest of the hills, has one of the best examples of an Iron Age settlement in Britain on its summit. Views from the summits, on a clear day, extend to Ireland, the whole of Cardigan Bay, Anglesey, Snowdonia, and the northern mountains of England. The central peak, the tallest at 561 metres (1,841 ft), is called Garn Ganol; the summit nearest the sea, and the lowest, is Garn For, home to the quarry.

There is one school in Trefor, a primary school called Ysgol yr Eifl. As of 2023, 58 pupils were enrolled at the school. 88.6% of statutory school age pupils are from Welsh-speaking homes.

There was a football club in Trefor, which was re-established in the 2000–01 season. It has won one cup in its history, in the 2001–02 season.

There are two retail outlets in Trefor: a village shop which opens between 7.00 am and 7.00 pm Monday to Friday with shorter hours at the weekend, and a post office. To the north end of the village is a children's play area. It is possible to go on a pushchair-friendly circular walk, starting at the play area, down to the beach, across the headland and back into the village again.

Visitors can surf the other side of the harbour wall at Trefor. It can be a nice left-hand point over a stony reef thrown off the headland. There is a pier next to the harbour which is popular with those admiring the views it affords and people sea fishing from it.

Since 2015 a cycle club has been established in the village and surrounding area called Clwb Beicio'r Eifl. Its members regularly take part in sportives and club rides.

There are two bus operators serving Trefor, Berwyn Garage & Coaches and Clynnog & Trefor Motor Co Ltd; both are contracted by Gwynedd Council to run public services for the general population and for schoolchildren. Dogs are now permitted on these services (including registered Guide Dogs and/or Assistance Dogs).

== LIDAR anomaly ==
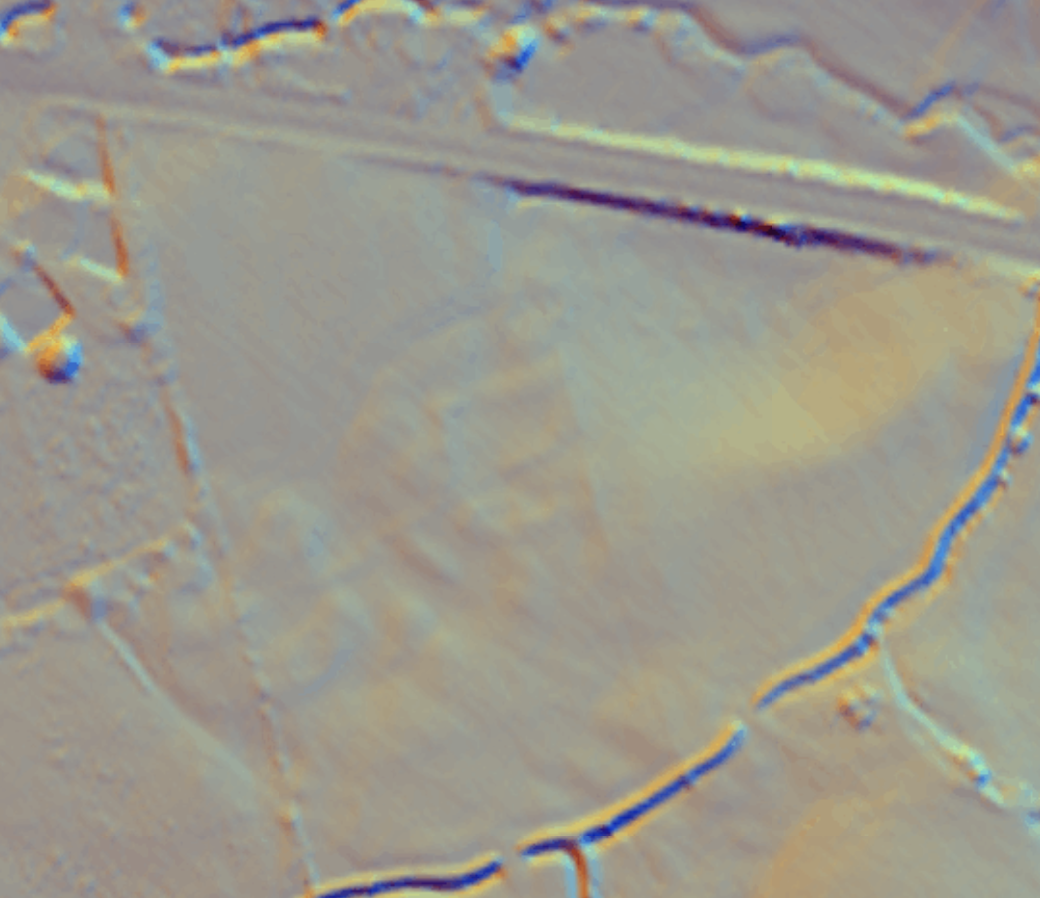
LIDAR map of a field next to Croes-Higol Road showing structural remains. The site is 1.54 ha (3.8 acres) in area.

Because of continued human activities within Trefor from Tre'r Ceiri hillfort to the modern granite mining, there are many unidentified markings within fields; for example, in a field at Croes-Higol, an archaeological desk-based assessment concluded that it featured "circular and rectangular anomalies...These features are included in the HER data due to their potential significance".

== Notable people ==
- Geraint Jones, Welsh writer, musician and language activist and one of the founders of Cymdeithas yr Iaith Gymraeg
- Alun Jones, Welsh author
- Guto Dafydd, poet and author

== Gallery ==
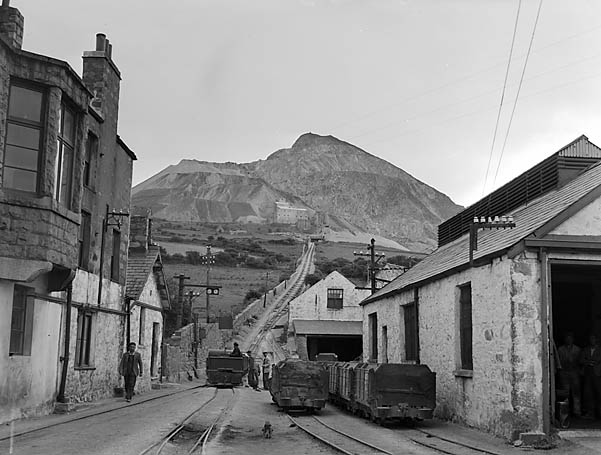
Quarry at Trefor, 1956

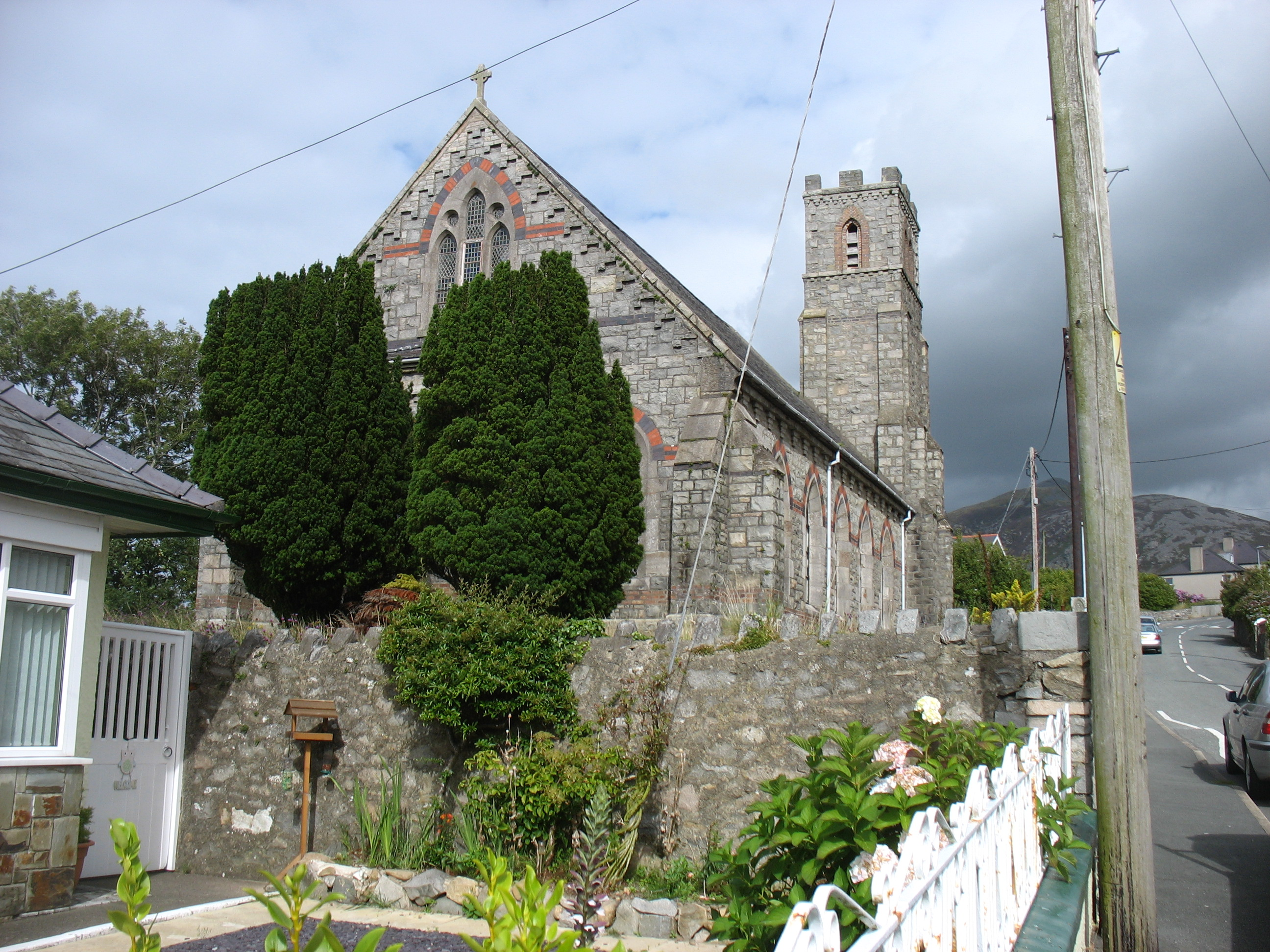
Sant Sior Church

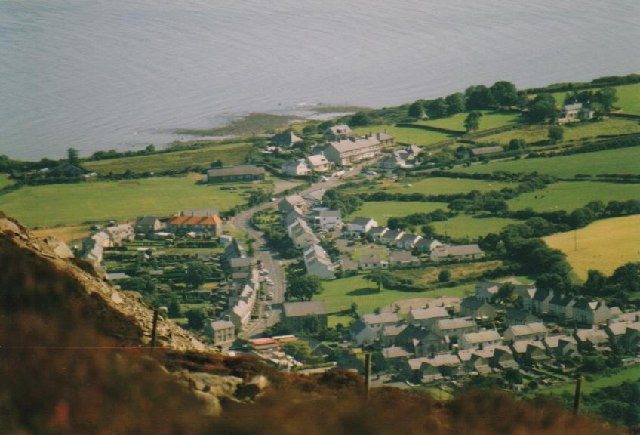
Overlooking Trefor village and beach

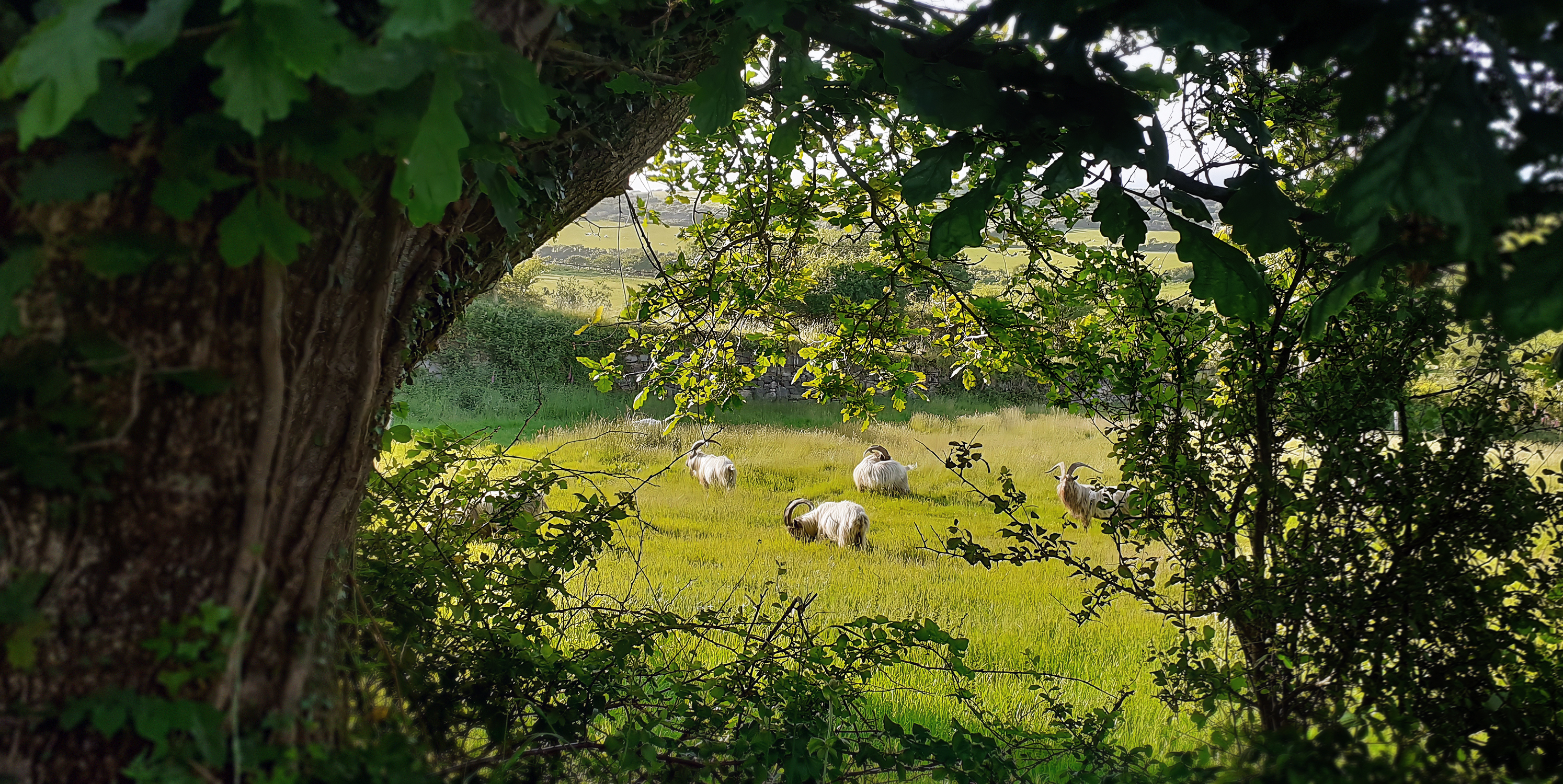
A group of wild mountain goats grazing at Trefor by Yr Eifl, Penrhyn Llŷn
