= Yr Eifl =

Hill (560.7m) in Gwynedd, Wales

Coordinates: 52.97462°N 4.43792°W

- The Rivals
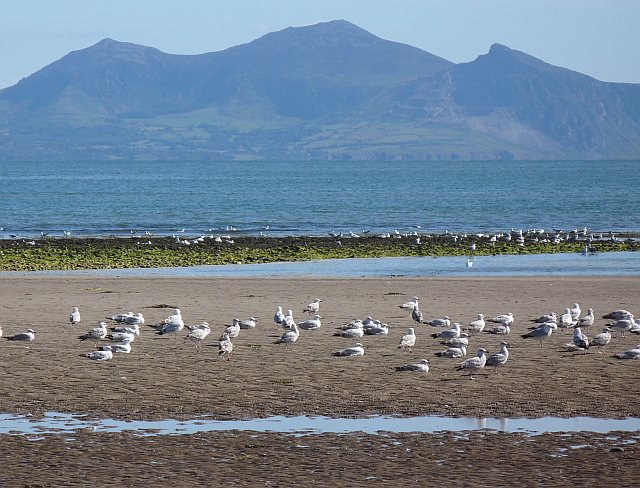
- Yr Eifl from Ynys Llanddwyn

Highest point
- Elevation: 561 m (1,841 ft)
- Prominence: 429 m (1,407 ft)
- Parent peak: Moel Hebog
- Isolation: 13.47 km (8.37 mi)
- Listing: Marilyn

Naming
- Language of name: Welsh
- Pronunciation: Welsh: [ər ˈei̯vl]

Geography
- Location: Llŷn Peninsula, Wales
- OS grid: SH364447
- Topo map: OS Landranger 123

Yr Eifl, sometimes called the Rivals in English, is a group of hills on the north coast of the Llŷn Peninsula in Gwynedd, Wales.

On a clear day, the views from the highest summit reach as far as the Isle of Man, the Wicklow Mountains in Ireland and the Lake District, as well as the entire sweep of Cardigan Bay.

The view of Yr Eifl is especially prominent from the SW coast of Anglesey, for instance from Ynys Llanddwyn.

Ordnance Survey maps show a height of 564 metres (1,850 ft), but a recent survey gives the height at 561 metres (1,841 ft).

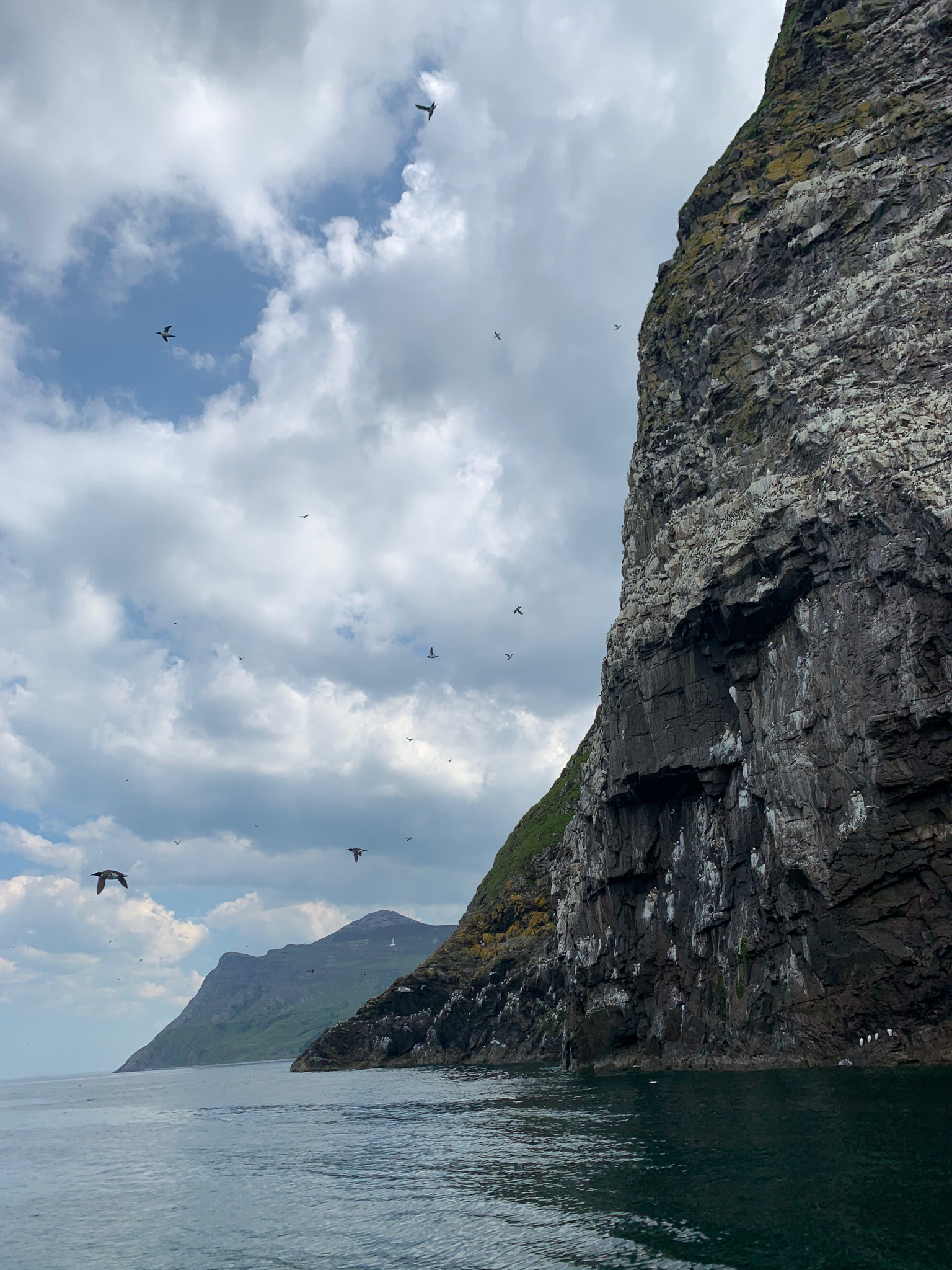
View NE to Trwyn y Gorlech from beneath cliffs near Penrhyn Glas

== The three peaks ==
There are three peaks:

- Tre'r Ceiri: 485 metres (1,591 ft),
- Garn Ganol: 561 metres (1,841 ft) and
- Garn Fôr: 444 metres (1,457 ft).

Garn Ganol, the central summit, is the highest point on Llŷn, with an ancient cairn, and a trig point.

Across the pass "Bwlch yr Eifl", and overlooking the sea, is Garn Fôr, the northern summit. Garn Fôr is also known as Mynydd y Gwaith. It has a microwave radio relay station on it, as well as cairns and granite quarries (which produced the material for the curling event at the 2006 Winter Olympics), and a cliff face dropping to the Irish Sea at Trwyn y Gorlech.

The third summit, Tre'r Ceiri, on the south-eastern side, is the location of an Iron Age hillfort. Its name means "settlement of the giants", from cewri, plural of cawr, giant. It is regarded as one of the best examples of a prehistoric hillfort in Europe. A path leads to the summit.

== Surroundings ==
Routes lead onto the hill from the nearby villages of Llithfaen to the south, Llanaelhaearn to the east and Trefor to the north. On the western slopes of Yr Eifl, beneath Graig Ddu (a cliff on the western slope of Garn Ganol), a small valley leads down to the sea. This is Nant Gwrtheyrn ("Vortigern's valley"), a valley with access via a private road, with a former quarry village, which is now home to a Welsh language teaching centre, which is a popular tourist attraction too.

Another quarry, Trefor granite quarry, can be found to the north of Garn Ganol.
