= Tor y Foel =

Hill (551m) in Powys, Wales

Coordinates: 51.8669°N 3.2874°W

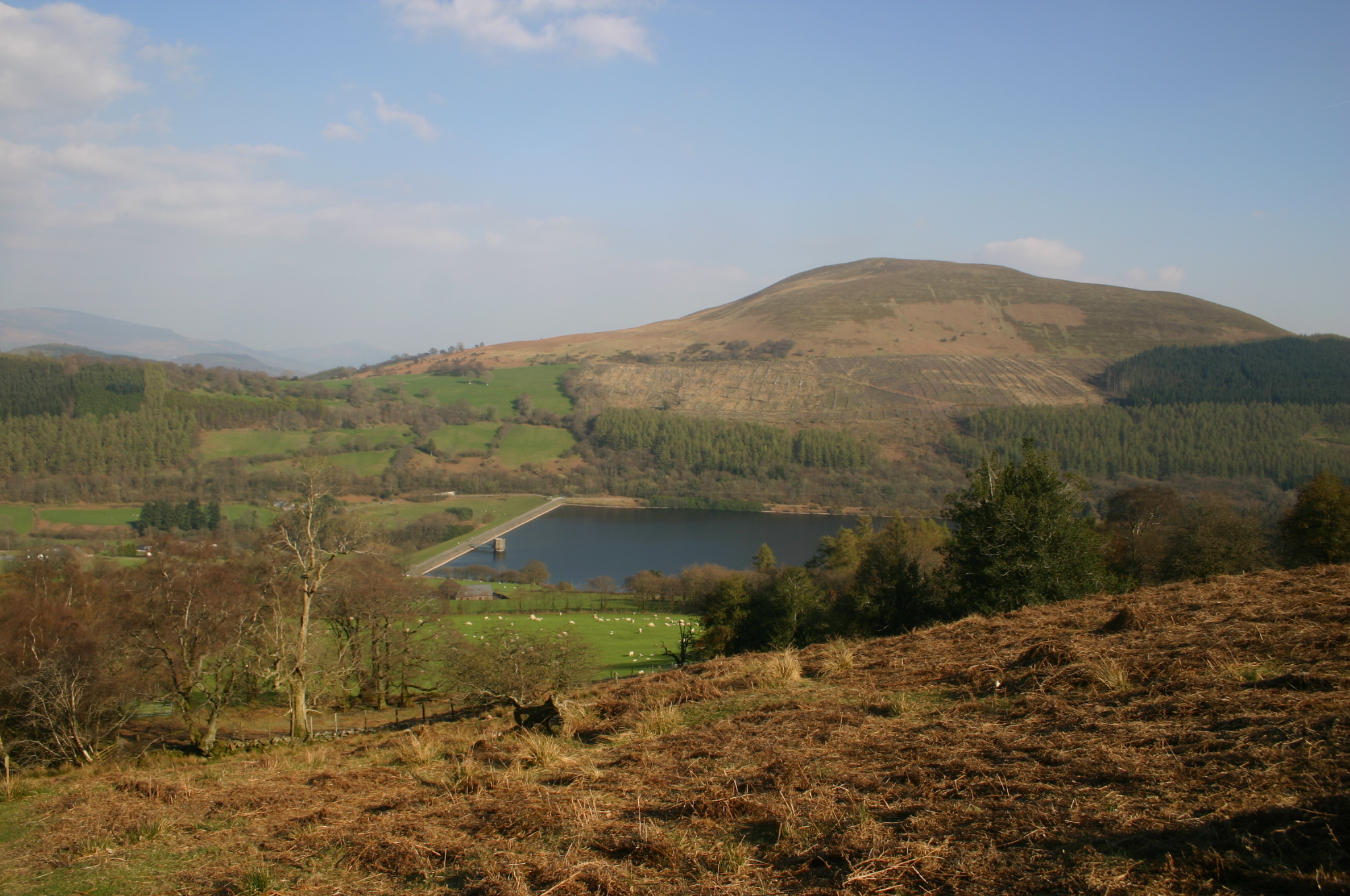
- View across Talybont Reservoir to Tor y Foel

Highest point
- Elevation: 551 m (1,808 ft)
- Prominence: 157 m (515 ft)
- Listing: Marilyn

Geography
- Parent range: Brecon Beacons

Tor y Foel is a hill in the Brecon Beacons National Park in the county of Powys in Wales. It is located on the eastern flank of Talybont Reservoir, and the summit at 551m is marked by a small cairn. It gives excellent panoramic views over the valley of the River Usk, across to the Black Mountains and west to the Brecon Beacons.

== Geology ==
The hill is formed entirely from sandstones and mudstones of the Brownstones Formation of the Old Red Sandstone laid down during the lower Devonian period. Where they are exposed these rocks are seen to dip gently southeastwards. Small diggings near the top of the hill may have been for stone suitable for use as roof tiles.

== Access ==
The upper reaches of the hill are mapped as open country and therefore available for walkers to roam at will. A minor public road from Talybont-on-Usk skirts the western side of the hill and a bridleway from Llangynidr gives access to the eastern corner of the hill.
