= Carn Gafallt =

Protected area in Powys, Wales

Highest point
- Elevation: 466 m (1,529 ft)
- Prominence: 157 m (515 ft)
- Coordinates: 52.27°N 3.55°W

Geography
- Topo map(s): Landranger 147; Explorer 200W

Geology
- Mountain type: Marilyn

Carn Gafallt is a Site of Special Scientific Interest in Brecknockshire, Powys, Wales, and a hill of 466 metres (1,529 ft) which is a Marilyn.

== See also ==
- List of Sites of Special Scientific Interest in Brecknock
