= Heol Senni Quarry =

Protected disused quarry in Powys, Wales

- Site of Special Scientific Interest
- Location within Wales
- Location of Heol Senni Quarry.
- Area of search: Powys
- Grid reference: SN9147622123
- Coordinates: 51.887066°N 3.5782601°W
- Interest: Geology
- Area: 3.34 ha (8.3 acres)
- Notification date: 11 April 1988

Heol Senni Quarry is a disused quarry in Brecknockshire, Powys, Wales. It is a Site of Special Scientific Interest because of the geological strata it reveals and the fossil remains of pterapsids which have been found here. The quarry is also used recreationally for paragliding.

== The quarry ==
Heol Senni is a hamlet in the valley of the Afon Senni just north of the Fforest Fawr section of the Brecon Beacons National Park. The Welsh name means the 'road by (the river) Senni' and reflects its position near the crossing of the river by the minor road running from the A4067 road to the A4215 road. The Heol Senni Quarry is on the hillside to the southwest of the village and was quarried for stone extensively in the nineteenth century. The quarry is also used for paragliding, and is said to be excellent for thermalling and crosscountry flying.

== Geology ==
The Heol Senni Quarry is of interest to geologists because of the non-marine Devonian rocks here. The exposed rocks are brownstones, an example of the upper part of the Welsh Lower Old Red Sandstone. The brownstones consist of pebbly, cross-bedded sands, which formed in a large braided river system. They "allow reconstruction of bar morphologies and river size, and show the way channels were stacked vertically to build up the sequence." Of the eastern Brownstone outcrops in South Wales, Heol Senni is a fine example, showing how these loose, unconsolidated sediments have been eroded, reshaped and redeposited over time.

== Fossils ==
The Heol Senni Quarry is also of interest to paleontologists. It is the only locality at which the pterapsid Althaspis senniensis, an extinct jawless fish, has been found, and another closely related pterapsid Rhinopteraspis dunensis has been found in a neighbouring quarry. Such finds are very rare in the Senni Beds. As the site is protected as a Site of Special Scientific Interest, fossils, stones and geological objects may not be collected or removed from the site.

== Wildlife ==
Peregrine falcons nest on the higher ledges of the quarry, and foxes are sometimes seen. In 2001, two hounds from the local hunt chasing a fox on a high ledge, fell to their deaths.

== See also ==
- List of Sites of Special Scientific Interest in Brecknock
