= Llanfawr Mudstones =

Geologic formation in Wales

- Stratigraphic range: Ordovician
- Type: Formation

Location
- Region: Wales
- Country: United Kingdom

The Llanfawr Mudstones is a geologic formation in central Wales. It preserves fossils dating back to the Ordovician period. The Llanfawr Mudstone Formation is located near Llandrindod Wells. Less than 500 metres in thickness, it separates the Trelowgoed Volcanic Formation from the Builth Volcanic Group.

== See also ==
- List of fossiliferous stratigraphic units in Wales
- Llanfawr Quarries
