= Nant Menasgin =

River in Powys, Wales

Coordinates: 51.91946°N 3.31766°W

The Nant Menasgin is a short river in Powys, Wales whose headwaters rise in Cwm Oergwm, beneath Fan y Bîg, in the central Brecon Beacons, and flow northeastwards via Llanfrynach, to join the River Usk at Pencelli.

The stream in Cwm Oergwm is joined by that from Cwm Cwareli within woodland owned by the National Trust. Above Llanfrynach, much of the length of the river is paralleled by bridleways affording some degree of visibility to the public. The first vehicle bridge to cross the river is Llanfrynach Bridge which also carries the route of the Taff Trail. A further 1 kilometre (0.62 mi) downstream the Monmouthshire and Brecon Canal crosses by means of an aqueduct and a third bridge conveys the B4558 road just northwest of Pencelli.

== See also ==
- Coed Nant Menascin
