= Cwm Craig-ddu Quarry =

Protected disused quarry in Powys, Wales

Coordinates: 52.115618°N 3.517352°W

Cwm Craig-ddu Quarry is a disused quarry in Brecknock, Powys, Wales. It has been designated as a Site of Special Scientific Interest because of the fossils found there, particularly the fossils of the earliest vascular land plant yet discovered.

== The site ==
Cwm Craig-ddu Quarry is a disused quarry that is now much overgrown with plants and bushes. It is located near the B4519 about one mile south of the village of Garth which is on the main A483 road between Llandovery and Builth Wells. The quarry is up a track with a cattle grid at its foot. It is thought that Cwm Craig-ddu Quarry yields the fossilised remains of the earliest vascular land plant yet to have been found anywhere in the world.

== Fossils ==
Cwm Craig-ddu Quarry is renowned for its fossils, particularly of bivalve molluscs and plants. Fossils can be found in both the disused quarry and in the rock face of the roadside cutting and other rocky outcrops in the vicinity. The fossils are mostly the preserved remains of small bivalve molluscs and are mainly well-preserved. They can be found when slabs of rock are split, but this site is preserved as a Site of Special Scientific Interest and the use of hammers is not allowed. There are also remains of primitive vascular land plants at the site, in fact these are believed to be the oldest such fossil plants in Britain. They are all in the genus Cooksonia and are mostly in the quarry itself.

== Geology ==
The exposed rocks are Silurian period siltstones from some 420 million years ago and form part of the Pterinea Beds of the Wilsonia Shales Formation in the Ludlow Group.

== See also ==
- List of Sites of Special Scientific Interest in Brecknock
