= Llithfaen =

Village in northwest Wales

Coordinates: 52.960556°N 4.448889°W

- Village
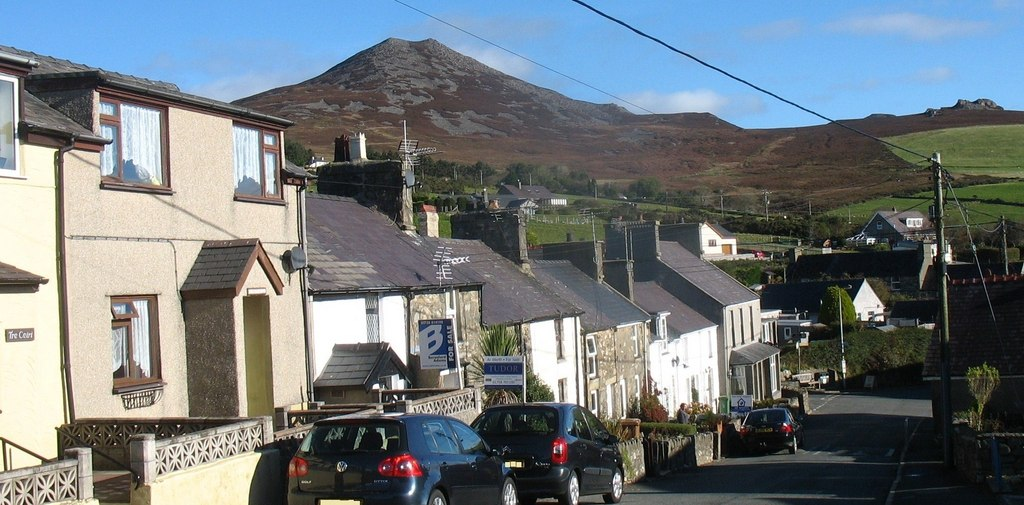
- A view of a road leading up to Llithfaen's crossroads near the Central of Llithfaen

- Location within Gwynedd
- OS grid reference: SH355431
  - Dublin: 116 miles
- Community: Pistyll
- Principal area: Gwynedd
- Preserved county: Gwynedd
- Country: Wales
- Sovereign state: United Kingdom
- Post town: PWLLHELI
- Dialling code: 01758
- Police: North Wales
- Fire: North Wales
- Ambulance: Welsh
- UK Parliament: Dwyfor Meirionnydd
- Senedd Cymru – Welsh Parliament: Dwyfor Meirionnydd

Llithfaen (Welsh pronunciation: [ˈɬɪθvaɨ̯n]) is a village on the North West of Wales on the Llŷn Peninsula in Gwynedd, Wales. It is within the community of Pistyll near Caernarfon Bay. Pwllheli is the nearest town, approximately 8 miles (13 km) away, and Caernarfon is 16 miles (26 km) away.

There is a shop, pub, playground, community hall located in the village centre. Nant Gwrtheyrn is a Welsh language heritage centre near the village.

There is a river called Afon Erch running from Llithfaen to the village of Abererch. The village of Trefor and Trefor Beach is nearby.

As of 2002, musician Ian Brown had a holiday home in the village.

== History ==
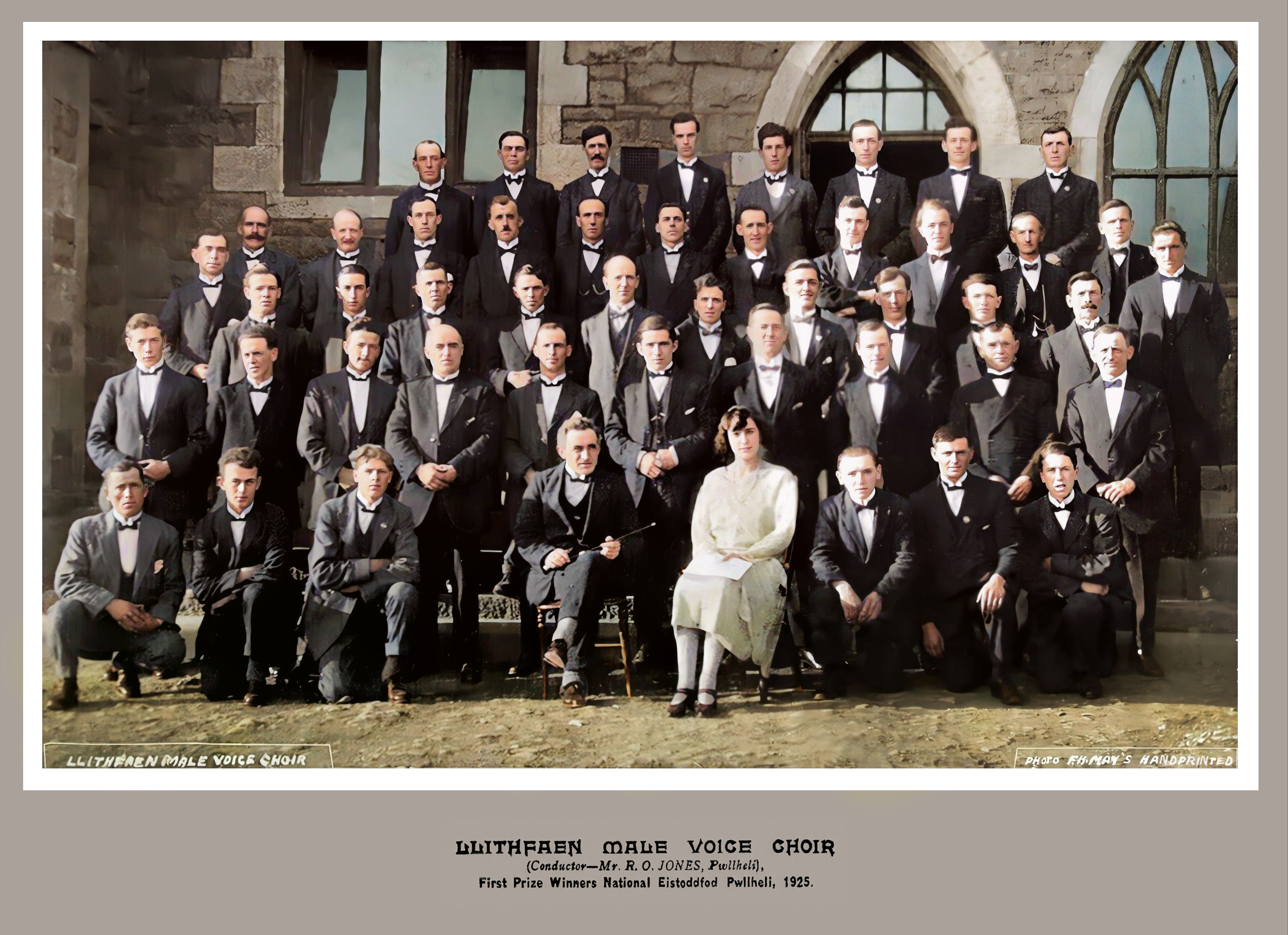
Llithfaen male choir (Conductor - R. O. Jones, Pwllheli), First Prize Winners National Eisteddfod Pwllheli, 1925

Llithfaen Calvinistic Methodist Chapel was built in 1780 and rebuilt several times to cope with the growing population. It was most recently rebuilt (Capel Isaf) in 1905.

In the first half of the 19th century, many smallholders of the parish supplemented their incomes by taking heather cut from the slopes of Tre'r Ceiri to be sold as kindling in Pwllheli for sixpence a bundle.

The population grew with the opening of granite quarries on Yr Eifl in the 19th century. Many houses were built, and the census in 1881 shows many immigrants from other areas of the peninsula, Penmaenmawr and as far as Scotland. Three quarries were close to the village, the last of which (Chwarel Carreg y Llam) closed in 1963. The other two were Y Nant and Caer Nant.

== Governance ==
The area is in the Senedd constituency of Dwyfor Meirionydd and the Westminster constituency of the same name.

Historically, Llithfaen was administered as part of the county of Caernarfonshire until 1974. It was in Lleyn Rural District from 1894 to 1974. From 1974 to 1996, it was part of the Dwyfor district of Gwynedd.
