= Abercriban Quarries =

Protected area in Powys, Wales

Coordinates: 51°48′18.0″N 3°21′34.8″W

Abercriban Quarries is a Site of Special Scientific Interest in Brecknock, Powys, Wales.

The quarries are located near the village of Pontsticill, overlooking Pontsticill Reservoir. Abercriban Quarries comprise two small disused quarries. The site is of special interest for the rock exposures of the Grey Grit Formation of the Upper Old Red Sandstone, these exposed rocks span the boundary between the Carboniferous and Devonian periods of geological time, approximately 360 million years ago.

== See also ==
- List of Sites of Special Scientific Interest in Brecknock
