= Coed y Ciliau =

Protected area in Powys, Wales

Coordinates: 52.178244°N 3.539671°W

Coed y Ciliau is a Site of Special Scientific Interest in Brecknock, Powys, Wales. The site is near the Dulais valley and is best known for multiple species of Lichen.

== See also ==
- List of Sites of Special Scientific Interest in Brecknock
