= Allt Cynhelyg =

Protected woodland in Powys, Wales

- Site of Special Scientific Interest
- Location within Wales
- Location of Allt Cynhelyg.
- Area of search: Powys
- Grid reference: SO0266747173
- Coordinates: 52.114282°N 3.4228349°W
- Interest: Biological
- Area: 14.63 ha (36.2 acres)
- Notification date: 1 January 1972

Allt Cynhelyg is a semi-natural oak-hazel woodland forming a Site of Special Scientific Interest in Brecknock, Powys, Wales. It has a notable natural population of Meconopsis cambrica (Welsh poppy).

== See also ==
- List of Sites of Special Scientific Interest in Brecknock
