= Cae Gwernllertai =

Protected area in Powys, Wales

- Site of Special Scientific Interest
- Location within Wales
- Location of Cae Gwernllertai.
- Area of search: Wales
- Grid reference: SN9423124373
- Coordinates: 51.907818°N 3.5389367°W
- Interest: Biological
- Area: 1.66 ha (4.1 acres)
- Notification date: 26 June 1990

Cae Gwernllertai is a Site of Special Scientific Interest since 26 June 1990 as a conservation attempt to protect the site in Brecknock, Powys, Wales. It is designated for acid grassland, marshy grassland, semi-natural woodland and wet heath. Natural Resources Wales is the body responsible for the site.

== Wildlife ==
The site was designated on the basis of its wildlife, for example taxonomic groups such as birds, butterflies, lizards, reptiles or insects. Wildlife sites are usually related to the continuation and development of the environment such as traditional grazing land.

== General information ==
SSSI contains a wide variety of habitats, including small fens, riverside meadows, sand dunes, woodlands and uplands. It is a piece of land that is protected under the Wildlife and Countryside Act 1981 because it contains wildlife or geographical features or landforms of particular importance.

== See also ==
- List of Sites of Special Scientific Interest in Brecknock
