= Vicarage Meadows =

Protected area in Powys, Wales

Coordinates: 52.15988°N 3.68325°W

Vicarage Meadows is a Site of Special Scientific Interest near Abergwesyn, Powys, Wales.

The 3.6 hectares (8.9 acres) site, located close to the Nant Irfon National Nature Reserve, has unimproved acid grassland on which grow the small-white orchid, the fragrant orchid (Gymnadenia conopsea), the Greater Butterfly orchid (Platanthera chlorantha) and the Wood Bitter-vetch (Vicia orobus). The site is grazed by Exmoor ponies.

== See also ==
- List of Sites of Special Scientific Interest in Brecknock
