= Coed Nant Menascin =

Protected area in Powys, Wales

Coordinates: 51.901°N 3.368°W

- Interactive map of Coed Nant Menascin
- Location: Powys, Wales
- Area: 0.496 km^{2} (0.192 sq mi)
- Elevation: 240 m (790 ft)
- Established: 1991

Coed Nant Menascin is a Site of Special Scientific Interest (SSSI), around the Nant Menasgin, near Llanfrynach in the Brecon Beacons National Park, Powys, Wales. (grid reference SO059233)

The Cwm Oergwm Nature Reserve of the Brecknock Wildlife Trust forms a large part of the site.

The site comprises semi-natural woodland in the steep wooded valley of the Nant Menascin (Menasgin), on the north-east slopes of the Brecon Beacons. The woodland supports a wide variety of higher and lower plants.

Access is restricted, except for the public footpaths that cross the site.

== See also ==
- List of Sites of Special Scientific Interest in Brecknock
