= Love and Other Demons (album) =

Studio album by Strangelove
- Released: 1996
- Recorded: 1995
- Label: Food
- Producer: Paul Corkett, Strangelove

Strangelove chronology
Time for the Rest of Your Life (1994)	Love and Other Demons (1996)	Strangelove (1997)

Love and Other Demons is the second album by the English band Strangelove, released in 1996. The first single was "Living with the Human Machines".

The album peaked at No. 44 on the UK Albums Chart.

== Production ==
The album was produced by Paul Corkett and the band. Frontman Patrick Duff had to push himself into short periods of sobriety to work on the songs; he entered rehab after the recording sessions were completed. Brett Anderson contributed backing vocals to "She's Everywhere". "Sway" addresses Duff's alcoholism.

== Critical reception ==
Professional ratings
Review scores
Source	Rating
AllMusic	2/5 stars
The Encyclopedia of Popular Music	3/5 stars
NME	7/10
Martin C. Strong	6/10

NME wrote that "it's easy to dismiss Love And Other Demons as just another load of maudlin toss, but, as a refreshing counterfoil to the current dizzgo pop Bis-ness, it's reason enough to occasionally stop the gladness." The Guardian opined that the "music has grown smooth, and frankly a trifle Adult Orientated ... True, 'Beautiful Alone' might very well be The Smiths, and 'Casualties' builds to a roaring guitar maelstrom, but elsewhere it's strings, piano and tasteful harmonies." The Observer noted that the album "sounded like a series of exorcisms, particularly its beautiful keynote 'Sway'."

The Sunday Times called the album "classy and assured" and noted the "uncommonly poignant lyrics." The South China Morning Post determined that "Strangelove are also masters of the crescendo—'Casualties' starts calmly, but climaxes with a cascade of grinding power chords." The Times concluded that Strangelove's "emotional strength lies in a certain heroic despair."

AllMusic wrote that "this is the equivalent of a dormitory's ubiquitous sourpuss reading Proust only when other people are watching."

== Track listing ==
No.	Title	Length
1.	"Living with the Human Machines"
2.	"Beautiful Alone"
3.	"Sway"
4.	"20th Century Cold"
5.	"She's Everywhere"
6.	"#1432"
7.	"Casualties"
8.	"Spiders and Flies"
9.	"Elin's Photograph"
10.	"The Sea of Black"
