= Bryn Oer Tramway =

Horse-worked narrow-gauge railway built in South Wales

Overview
- Headquarters: Talybont-on-Usk
- Locale: Wales
- Dates of operation: 1815–1865
- Successor: Abandoned

Technical
- Track gauge: 3 ft 6 in (1,067 mm)
- Length: 8 mi (13 km)

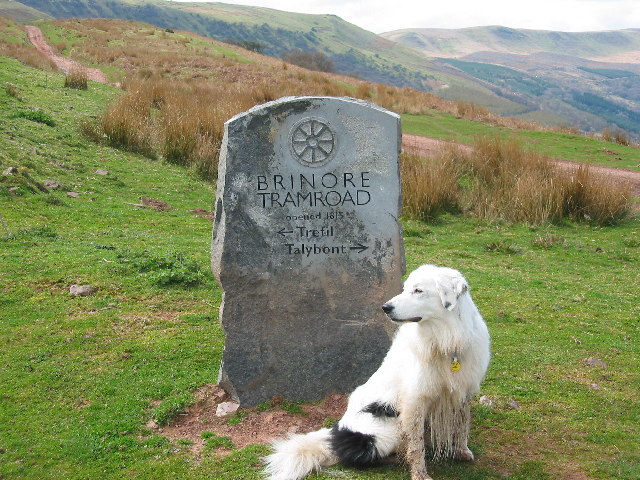
Stone marker

The Bryn Oer Tramway (also known as the Brinore Tramroad) was a horse-worked narrow-gauge railway built in South Wales in 1814.

== History ==
The Brecknock and Abergavenny Canal was built under an act of Parliament of 1793. The act allowed the canal company to build feeder railways up to 8 miles (13 km) in length to transport freight to the canal for transshipment. The Bryn Oer Tramway was built under this act in 1814, opening in 1815. It was a horse-worked plateway that served the Bryn Oer collieries and the limestone quarries at Trefil, dropping 330 m or 1,080 ft along its route to the canal at Talybont-on-Usk. An extension was built to serve the Rhymney ironworks in the Rhymney Valley.

By the 1830s, the growth of local railways had begun to complete with the tramway, especially with the introduction of steam locomotives that were too heavy to work on the fragile plateway. By 1860, most of the tramway's traffic was being sent by railways and it closed in 1865.

== The tramway today ==
Much of the route of the tramway is in use as a public bridleway for walkers, horseriders and mountain-bikers, and stone sleepers remain in place in several places.

A Brinore Tramroad Conservation Forum has been established to protect and conserve the remains of this important piece of Wales' industrial archaeology. The Forum comprises the Brecon Beacons National Park Authority, Natural Resources Wales, Tredegar Town Council, Talybont and Llangynidr community councils together with Llangynidr Historical Society and individuals.

== See also ==
- British industrial narrow-gauge railways
