= Caeau Nant y Llechau =

Protected area in Powys, Wales

- Site of Special Scientific Interest
- Location within Wales
- Location of Caeau Nant y Llechau.
- Area of search: Powys
- Grid reference: SN9017810332
- Coordinates: 51.780841°N 3.5933663°W
- Interest: Biological
- Area: 7.58 ha (18.7 acres)
- Notification date: 1 January 1978

Caeau Nant y Llechau is a Site of Special Scientific Interest in Brecknock, Powys, Wales. It is the largest area of traditional unimproved hay meadow known in Brecknock. Over 110 species have been recorded in the grassland areas.

== See also ==
- List of Sites of Special Scientific Interest in Brecknock
