= Mwyngloddfa Nantiago =

Protected area in Powys, Wales

- Site of Special Scientific Interest
- Location within Wales
- Location of Mwyngloddfa Nantiago.
- Area of search: Powys
- Grid reference: SN8264386228
- Coordinates: 52.461347°N 3.728741°W
- Interest: Geology
- Area: 2.67 ha (6.6 acres)
- Notification date: 28 June 2002

Mwyngloddfa Nantiago is a Site of Special Scientific Interest in Powys, Wales. It is located on the eastern flank of the Plynlimon range of mountains. The spoil tips at the disused mine display examples of mineralisation.

== See also ==
- List of Sites of Special Scientific Interest in Powys
