= Pencelli =

Hamlet in the county of Powys, Wales

Coordinates: 51.916°N 3.320°W

Pencelli is a small village within the community of Talybont-on-Usk in the county of Powys, Wales, and the historic county of Brecknockshire. The Welsh name signifies the 'end of (a) grove'. It lies just to the southeast of Brecon in the Brecon Beacons National Park. The village sits near the confluence of the Nant Menasgin with the River Usk. Both the B4558 and the Monmouthshire and Brecon Canal pass through the village. There is a pub - the Royal Oak, an outdoor education centre and a campsite within the village. Pencelli Castle is likely a late eleventh century fortification which fell into disuse in the thirteenth century.

The population of the whole community (not just Pencelli) as taken at the 2011 census was 719. The village itself has less than 90 people. The community is included in the Talybont-on-Usk electoral ward, which chooses one county councillor for Powys County Council.
