= Garth Bank Quarry =

Protected area in Powys, Wales

Coordinates: 52.146456°N 3.540967°W

Garth Bank Quarry is a Site of Special Scientific Interest in Brecknock, Powys, Wales.

The Countryside Council for Wales describes the significance of the quarry as follows:

"The rocks in this quarry are siltstones and pebbly sandstones of late Ordovician and Early Silurian age, approximately 440 to 445 million years old. The rocks provide an insight into the environmental conditions at the boundary between the Ordovician and Silurian Periods. The oldest rocks in the quarry comprise late Ordovician siltstones. These contain fossilised remains of brachiopods, a marine sea-shell. After a break in deposition these siltstones are overlain by pebbly, rippled sandstones which range from very late Ordovician to Silurian in age."

== See also ==
- List of Sites of Special Scientific Interest in Brecknock
