= Caeau Bronydd-mawr =

Protected area in Powys, Wales

- Site of Special Scientific Interest
- Location within Wales
- Location of Caeau Bronydd-mawr.
- Area of search: Powys
- Grid reference: SN8850430043
- Coordinates: 51.957658°N 3.6239923°W
- Interest: Biological
- Area: 7.99 ha (19.7 acres)
- Notification date: 15 August 1985

Caeau Bronydd-mawr is a Site of Special Scientific Interest in Brecknock, Powys, Wales. It is a fen meadow, notable for its contrasting neutral and acid grassland areas. The site is under private ownership.

== See also ==
- List of Sites of Special Scientific Interest in Brecknock
