= Caernarfon Bay =

Bay in Irish Sea, United Kingdom

Coordinates: 53°06′N 4°33′W

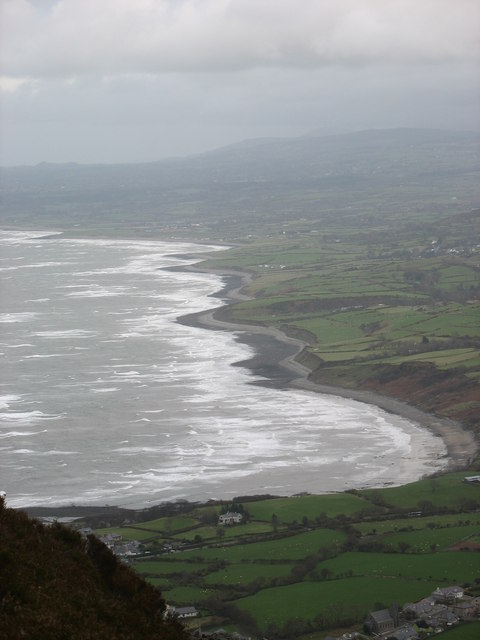
Caernarfon Bay

Caernarfon Bay (occasionally Caernarvon Bay) is an inlet of the Irish Sea defined by the Llŷn peninsula and Anglesey.

The gentle coastline surrounding it is home to villages including Nefyn, Pistyll, Trefor, Llithfaen, and Clynnog Fawr on the mainland, and Aberffraw, Llanddwyn and Rhosneigr on Anglesey.

The Menai Strait heads north east to link the bay to Conwy Bay.
