= Llechfaen =

Coordinates: 51.9468°N 3.3392°W

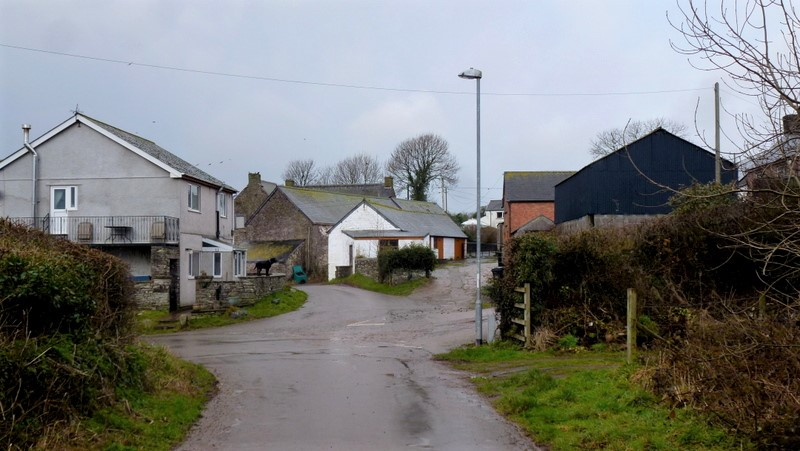
Houses in Llechfaen

Llechfaen is a village about 2 miles east of Brecon, Powys, Wales, in the foothills between the Brecon Beacons to the west and the Black Mountains to the east.

The surrounding villages include Groesffordd, Llanywern, and Llanfihangel Tal-y-llyn to the east.
