= Strangelove (band) =

English alternative rock band

- In Melody Maker, 7 November 1992

Background information
- Origin: Bristol, England
- Genres: Alternative rock, indie rock, progressive rock, Britpop
- Years active: 1991–1998
- Labels: Sermon, Rough Trade, Food/Parlophone
- Past members: Patrick Duff; Alex Lee; Julian Pransky-Poole; Joe Allen; John Langley; Nick Powell; David Francolini

Strangelove were an English alternative rock band, formed in Bristol in 1991 comprising singer Patrick Duff, guitarists Alex Lee & Julian Poole, bassist Joe Allen and John Langley on drums. They released two EPs and three albums before disbanding in 1998.

== History ==
Strangelove formed in Bristol, in 1991, after David Francolini (drums, of Levitation) spotted singer Patrick Duff, who at the time was a street busker. According to Duff, Francolini's words were "Get in the car, you're going to be a pop star." Francolini then got together various musicians he knew throughout the area; Alex Lee (guitar, formerly of the Blue Aeroplanes), Julian Pransky Poole (guitar, formerly part of The Jazz Butcher's band), and Joe Allen (bass guitar). With Francolini on drums, the quintet played their first gig at Bath Moles Club on 9 October 1991. Francolini took on the role of drummer for only two gigs, before being replaced by John Langley. The first song Duff wrote for Strangelove was titled "Zoo'd Out" in 1991, released the following year on the Volume 4 compilation, and in 1993 as part of Rough Trade's Single Club. Duff's tales of despair and sorrow struck a chord and his impressive, emotionally charged vocals were described by Tom Doyle in Q's World of Noise compilation as "evoking thoughts of Morrissey as vocally-tutored by Scott Walker"

Following an early morning set on the NME Stage at Glastonbury 1992, Strangelove were approached by John Peel to record a BBC Radio 1 session at Maida Vale, on 30 June. The band then released their first EP Visionary in October 1992 on Sermon Records, from which the title track was made 'single of the week' by Cathi Unsworth in Melody Maker. The track "Snakes" was taken directly from the Peel session. Another Peel session followed on 5 January 1993. Their second EP, Hysteria Unknown, in February 1993 earned them a support slot on Radiohead's Pop Is Dead tour. "Radiohead are definitely post-Strangelove," remarked Ed O'Brien. "We toured with them for 'Pop Is Dead' and we changed quite a lot after that. They were inspirational. Apart from their trousers."

Critical acclaim for the early singles led to major-label interest and they were signed to EMI label Food Records in 1993. Strangelove released their first album, Time for the Rest of Your Life on 1 August 1994, produced by Paul Corkett, who would go on to work on Strangelove's later albums. Time for the Rest of Your Life made numerous top album polls for 1994, and brought them to the attention of Suede who invited them to support on their Dog Man Star European tour in 1995. Manic Street Preachers' Richey Edwards was also a fan, inviting them to support at the London Astoria on the penultimate gig before his disappearance in 1995. Edwards' bandmate Nicky Wire commented that Time for the Rest of Your Life "fits staring out of the window and watching the rain in a small valley town". Suede and Strangelove bonded, and covered each other's songs at Sala Multiusos Zaragoza on 16 May 1995. Strangelove played Suede's "Killing of a Flashboy", while Suede played "She's Everywhere" (then under the working title "Spacey Vibe Thing"). Brett Anderson and Richard Oakes would later guest on this song in the studio as well as "Living With The Human Machines", providing backing vocals. Love and Other Demons was released on 17 June 1996. The second single from the album, "Beautiful Alone", went to number 35 in the UK Singles Chart.

For singer Patrick Duff, internalised struggles and a heavy addiction to drugs and alcohol threatened to take his life. His battle with depression and excess were highlighted in one vaguely suicidal Melody Maker interview in 1994, and an aborted NME interview during which he kept falling asleep due to the drugs and alcohol in his system. After the second album's recording, Duff was booked into a rehabilitation clinic. He wrote about this difficult journey to getting clean for The Guardian in 1996: "I was sick and tired of being sick and tired. My personal life was now in tatters – and I decided my last chance was to throw what was left of me into our album. Something was left in me that wanted to do something positive. Thank God." By this time, Nick Powell had joined the band to play keyboards, expanding their sound. A third, eponymously titled album was released 6 October 1997. Written in Bethlehem, South Wales, and recorded at Abbey Road Studio Two, this album was seen as significantly more uptempo than previous albums with Duff choosing to write less directly introspective. Songs like "Superstar" and "Freak", which were recorded live in the studio with minimal overdubs, set the tone.

The album yielded another UK Top 40 single, "The Greatest Show on Earth", and sell-out shows at the London Astoria and Shepherd's Bush Empire. However, seemingly on the point of a major breakthrough, Strangelove split up on 20 April 1998. In later interviews, Duff acknowledged how "unfocused" he was on music while in Strangelove, that he could sense the band had run its course, and he needed to get away from the fast-paced life of touring to truly recover and discover his calling as an artist. When asked about the possibility of a Strangelove reunion, Duff explains that while everyone in the band are still friends and is not completely opposed to the idea, the chances of it are very slim. As a solo artist, Duff has played stripped down, acoustic versions of Strangelove songs, sporadically. In December 2003, Duff and guitarist Alex Lee played a small retrospective gig at the Gin Palace, and in 2010 appeared on BCfm for John Peel Day, playing two acoustic versions of songs from their 1992 and 1993 Peel sessions. In 2019, Duff and Lee were interviewed by French magazine Soul Kitchen on the 25th anniversary of Strangelove's debut album.

== Post-Strangelove ==
In late 1998, Duff formed the short-lived band Moon, who performed a handful of gigs in England, and released a 7" single. After the swift dissolution of this band, Patrick then spent two introspective years living in a forest outside Bristol, a move which he explains he did out of fear, and the shame of "not being 'somebody' anymore". He was discovered in this forest by Thomas Brooman, the head of WOMAD Festival, where he was asked to perform. At this festival, Duff watched and met 81-year-old veteran South African master storyteller and musician Madosini, whom he would go to Langa, Cape Town to live and write songs with. In 2003, they went on to perform a number of successful concerts together around the world. Duff has released several solo albums, working on occasion with ex-bandmates Alex Lee and Dave Francolini.

Alex Lee joined Suede between 2001 and 2003; toured as an extra keyboardist and guitarist with Placebo on the Meds World Tour in 2006 and 2007; played guitar on Goldfrapp's 2008 album Seventh Tree and their 2013 album Tales Of Us and he toured both albums in the Goldfrapp live band as guitarist. He also continues to produce television and film soundtracks with Nick Powell, who has produced two albums with his own band OSKAR on Incarnation Records. Allen, Pransky-Poole and Langley formed Saturation Point. Their fourth album, Mechanisms, was released in 2009 on Invada Records.

A Strangelove B-side compilation album appeared in 2008 on EMI. In 2009, Strangelove's 1994 session on The Black Sessions was released.

In early October 2022, Patrick Duff announced the completion and pending release of his autobiography, The Singer, through Tangent Books. The book chronicles Duff's upbringing, his time in Strangelove, and his struggles with anxiety, depression & substance abuse. A promotional video featuring passages read from the book was shot by French film maker Sébastien Faits-Divers in Glastonbury Abbey where Duff is the artist in residence, as well as footage of Duff and guitarist Alex Lee performing Strangelove's "All Because of You" in 2021. Released on 22 November, Duff held a book launch party at Waterstones bookshop in the Galleries, Broadmead Bristol on Saturday 26 November 2022. The Singer has been warmly and positively received by fans and critics.

== Band members ==
The band's main line up was:

- Patrick Duff – vocals, guitar, piano
- Alex Lee – guitar, keyboards, synthezier, organ, piano, vocals
- Julian Pransky-Poole – guitar, piano, backing vocals
- Joe Allen - bass guitar
- John Langley – drums, percussion, backing vocals

Other musicians:

- David Francolini – drums (played two gigs with the band, before being replaced by John Langley.)
- Nick Powell – keyboards, synthesizer, organ, piano, samples, guitar, vocals from late 1996, and onwards.

== Discography ==
=== Albums ===
- Time for the Rest of Your Life (1994), Food/Parlophone – UK No. 69
- Love and Other Demons (1996), Food/Parlophone – UK No. 44
- Strangelove (1997), Food/Parlophone – UK No. 67
- One Up: The B–Sides (2008, iTunes only), EMI

=== EPs and singles ===
- Visionary EP (1992), Sermon
  - "Visionary" (1992), Sermon - Melody Maker 'Single of the week'
- Hysteria Unknown EP (1993), Sermon
  - "Hysteria Unknown" (1993), Sermon
- "Zoo'd Out" (1993), Rough Trade
- "Time for the Rest of Your Life" (1994), Food - Q Magazine's "Single of the year" (1995) – UK No. 88
- "Is There a Place?" (1994), Food – UK No. 97
- "All Because of You" (1994), Mother Tongue Records - Split single with My Life Story
- "Sand" (1994), Food - 10" single
- "Living with the Human Machines" (1996), Food – UK No. 53 - Features Brett Anderson and Richard Oakes of Suede
- "Beautiful Alone" (1996), Food – UK No. 35
- "Sway" (1996), Food – UK No. 47
- "She's Everywhere" (1997), Food - Features Brett Anderson
- "The Greatest Show on Earth" (1997), Food – UK No. 36
- "Freak" (1997), Food – UK No. 43
- "Another Night In" (1998), Food – UK No. 46
