= Llanfawr Quarries =

Series of quarries in Wales

There are four Llanfawr Quarries dolerite quarries near Llandrindod Wells, Wales they were excavated for building stone in the 19th and early 20th centuries. Three of these quarries constitute a Site of Special Scientific Interest and permission to collect must be sought from the Countryside Council for Wales.

== Igneous features ==
The dolerite lopoliths and laccoliths intrude through finely grained highly fossiliferous mudstones which underwent some contact metamorphism but stratigraphic units can still be distinguished.

== The Lower Llanfawr Quarry ==
This quarry contains remnant outcrops of highly trilobitic blue mudstones.

== The Upper Llanfawr Quarry ==
SO065617 This site preserves fossil fauna of great international importance within the basal Caradoc mudstones, and is one of four significant localities for soft-bodied faunas in the Ordovician worldwide. Iron pyrite fossil graptolites are visible at the outcrop, and less evident iron pyrite sponges, hydrozoans, echinoderms, nautiloids (with encrusting organisms), rare arthropods and worms are also present.

== The Main Llanfawr Quarry ==
The outcrops in the main quarry contain the most diverse fine‐sediment sponge fauna recorded from the British Palaeozoic. The sponges are primarily reticulosans, but includes some lyssakids and demosponges. The outcrops also contain trilobites, graptolites, chitinozoans, brachiopods, rare orthoconic nautiloids, gastropods, bivalves, dendroid graptolites and conulariids while fossils of rare soft-bodied organisms have also been recovered.

== See also ==
- Llanfawr Mudstone
