= Groesffordd =

Coordinates: 51.943°N 3.347°W

Groesffordd is a small village within the community of Llanfrynach in the county of Powys, Wales, and the historic county of Brecknockshire. The Welsh name signifies the 'crossroads'. It lies just to the east of Brecon straddling the northern boundary of the Brecon Beacons National Park. The village sits just to the north of the A40 road between Brecon and Crickhowell and north of the River Usk and Monmouthshire and Brecon Canal. The track of the former Brecon and Merthyr Railway runs through the village

The population of the whole community (not just Groesffordd) as taken at the 2011 census was 571.
