= Talybont Reservoir =

Dam in the Brecon Beacons in Wales

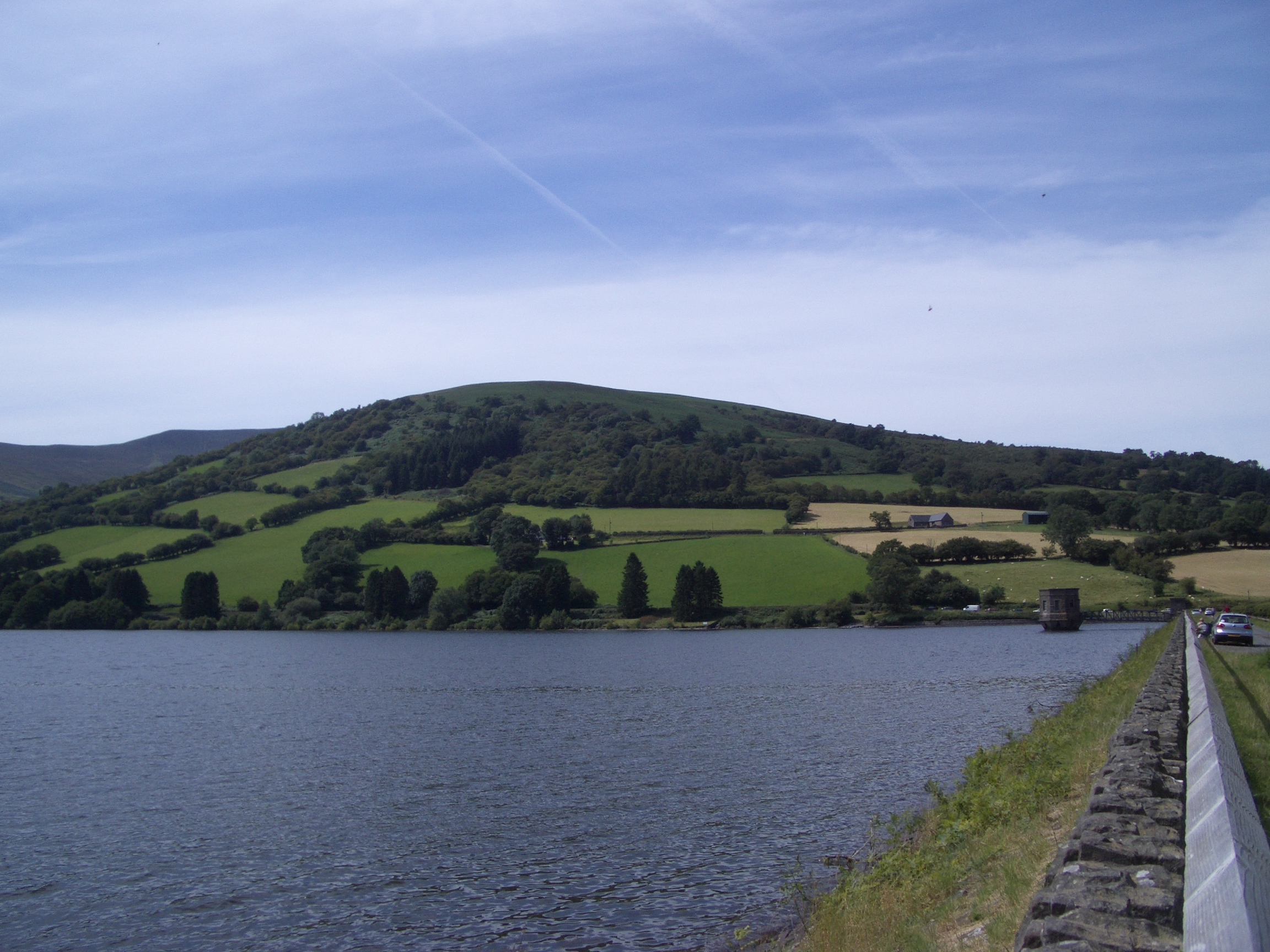

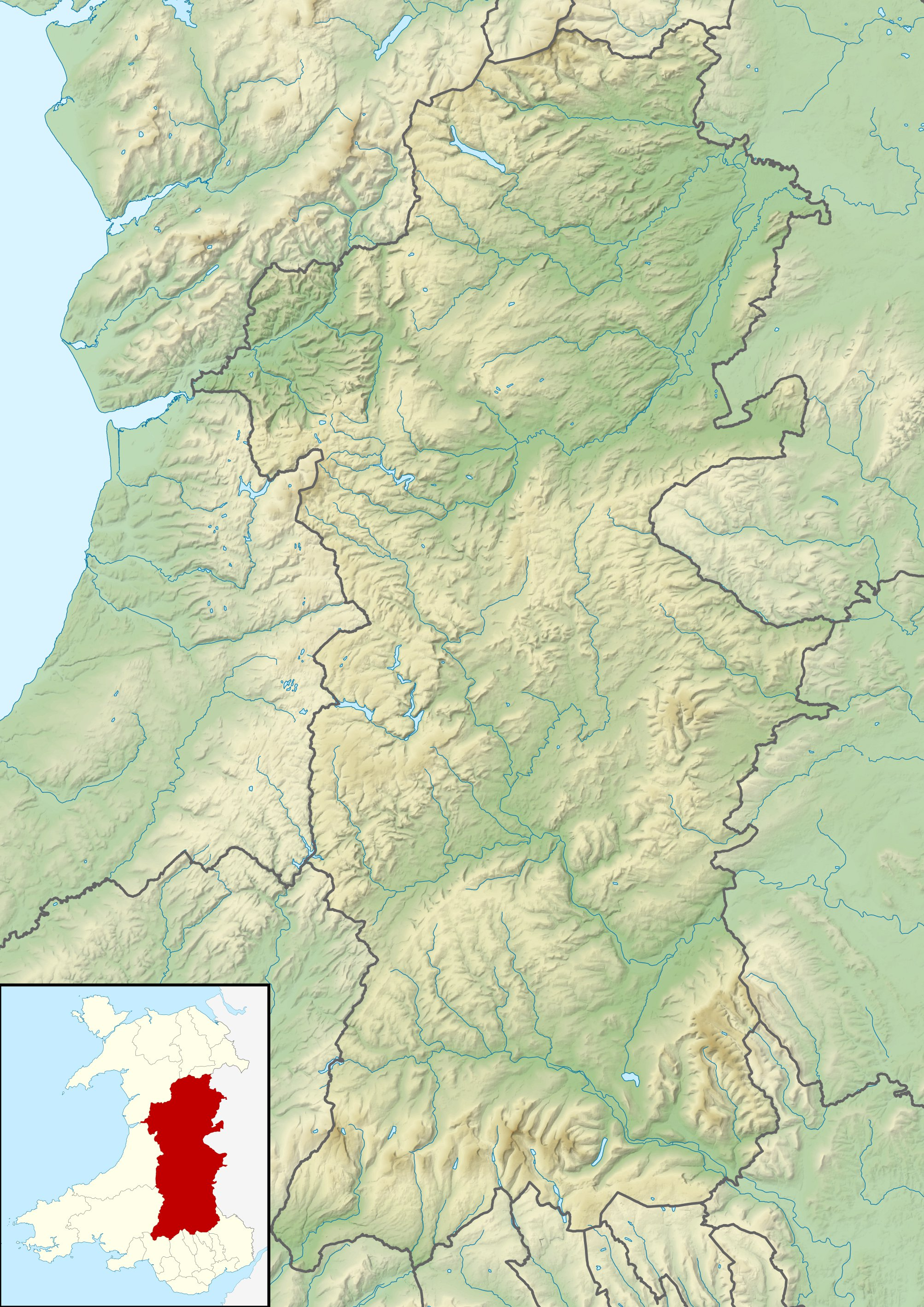
- Location within Powys
- Location: Brecon Beacons, Wales
- Coordinates: 51°51′40″N 3°18′30″W
- Type: Reservoir
- Basin countries: United Kingdom
- Surface area: 318 acres (129 ha)

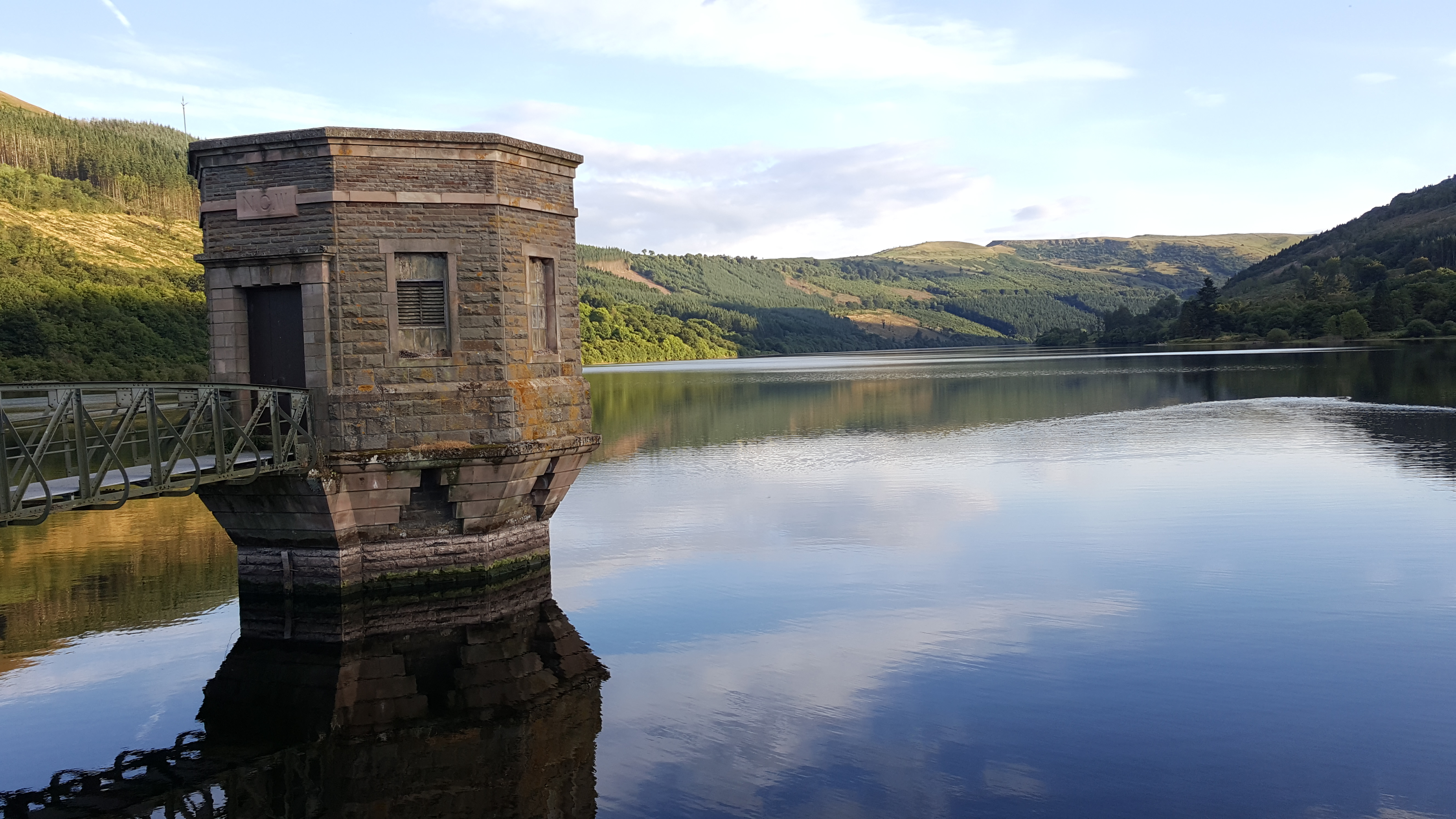
A view from Talybont Reservoir

Talybont Reservoir (Welsh: Cronfa Ddŵr Tal-y-bont) is the largest stillwater reservoir in the central Brecon Beacons at 318 acres (1.29 km^{2}). Talybont-on-Usk is 1.5 miles (2.4 km) downstream of the dam.

Construction of the current dam started in 1931 by Newport Corporation, and in 1939 the reservoir started supplying Newport with treated water.

The reservoir is now owned by Welsh Water. In 2019 a £10 million modernisation took place, including upgrading the pipework inside the dam.
