= Patrick Duff =

English singer-songwriter

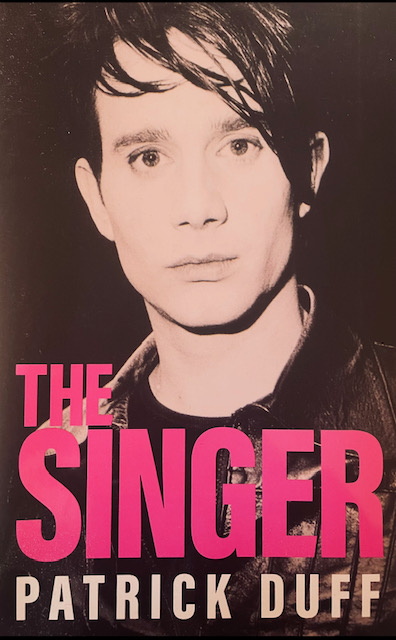
- The Singer; book cover (2023); Parlophone Records (1996)

Background information
- Born: 30 June 1966 (age 60)
- Origin: Bristol, England
- Genre: Folk/alternative rock,
- Occupation: Singer-songwriter
- Instruments: Vocals, Guitar, Piano
- Years active: 1990–present
- Labels: EMI Harvest; Food/Parlophone (EMI); Independent
- Website: facebook.com/PatrickDuffArtist

Patrick Duff (born 30 June 1966) is a British singer-songwriter, and the former lead singer of the alternative rock band Strangelove.

== Biography ==
Patrick was born in Bristol, England. After dropping out of school and spending time as a street busker, he became lead singer of the alternative rock band Strangelove, who were signed to Food Records, Parlophone/EMI. The band released three critically acclaimed albums between 1991 and 1998. After Strangelove, Duff briefly formed another band Moon, who split up after nine months having released only one single, "Anaesthesia". Between 2000 and 2004 Duff went on to travel the world as a solo artist with WOMAD Festival, collaborating with a number of artists, most notably the then 81-year-old veteran African master storyteller and musician Madosini, with whom he lived and worked in the township of Langa, in Cape Town, South Africa. Upon returning to the UK, Duff released his first solo album Luxury Problems (2005), produced by Adrian Utley of Portishead and Alex Lee (Goldfrapp/ Placebo / Suede / Strangelove). The album was released on EMI's legendary Harvest Records label – once home to Duff's childhood hero Syd Barrett.

The following year Duff was commissioned by Bristol City Council to write a Christmas choral symphony intended for a one-off exclusive performance at Bristol Cathedral, which he subsequently recorded over six weeks in Salt Lake City, Utah. The 90-minute piece, entitled "Seven Sermons to the Dead", was considered inappropriate by the council and was never staged, but instead released as an album in December 2013.

In 2009, Duff began work on his second solo album, The Mad Straight Road, a collection of 12 songs which he describes as "a synthesis of some of the music that has shaped my life – stuff like Disney soundtracks, The Beatles, The Kinks, Bob Dylan, Nick Cave and Johnny Cash – it all went right into the heart of me and came back sounding like this". The album features, alongside Duff, a host of acclaimed musicians, including drummer Damon Reece of Massive Attack, pianist John Baggott (of Robert Plant's Sweet Sensation, Massive Attack and Portishead), Phantom Limb's bass player Dan Brown (who also provided backing vocals) and pianist Dan Moore, members of the London Philharmonic Orchestra and Alex Lee, who plays the bowed saw on "Dead Man Singing". The Mad Straight Road was produced by Stew Jackson, and recorded at Robot Club Studios in Bristol. It was released in early 2010. Since 2010 Duff has begun to play many concerts in Europe as a one-man show where he has gathered a large and ever growing following.

On 9 August 2013 Duff released his third album, Visions of the Underworld. The album was recorded in the furthest reaches of wildest Dartmoor in a cottage owned by composer Nigel Shaw. On listening to the record, the sounds of the wilderness surrounding the cottage can be plainly heard in the background. Duff plays and sings each of the ten songs completely live and there is little to no overdubbing or editing on the album. The recordings have a mysterious ghostly atmosphere and the songs tell the stories of its various characters. After a successful campaign on Pledge Music, the album was released on CD and pressed to vinyl. Warmly received by fans and critics, Duff then proceeded to tour extensively throughout the UK, and Europe, appearing more frequently on radio shows, and in magazine articles.

Patrick Duff released his fifth solo album entitled Leaving My Father's House on Halloween in 2018, in CD, vinyl, and digital formats. The music video for the title track is a call back to The Mad Straight Road, where in the sophomore album's imagery, Patrick is photographed setting fire to his possessions in the woods.

In early October 2022, Duff announced the completion and pending release of his autobiography, The Singer, through Tangent Books. A promotional video featuring passages read from the book was shot by French film maker Sébastien Faits-Divers, in Glastonbury Abbey where Duff is the artist in residence. Released on 22 November, Duff held a book launch party at Waterstones bookshop in the Galleries, Broadmead Bristol on Saturday 26 November 2022. The Singer has been warmly and positively received by fans and critics.

In early 2024, Duff announced the release of his sixth album entitled ANOTHER WORD FOR ROSE for 1 November 2024.

== Discography ==
=== Albums ===
As a solo-artist:

- Luxury Problems (2005)
- The Mad Straight Road (2010)
- Visions of the Underworld (2013)
- Seven Sermons To The Dead (2013)
- Leaving My Father's House (2018)
- Another Word For Rose (2024)

=== Singles ===
With Moon:

- "Anaesthesia" / "We Are The Road" (7" Ltd. single; 1999)

As a solo-artist:

- "Married With Kids" (2005)
- "Thought Birds" (2014); split single with Craig John Davidson
- "Leaving My Father's House" (music video only; 2020)
- "Water" (2024)
- "Once" (2024); Radio edit

=== Books ===
- The Singer (Vol. 1) - Tangent Books; 22 November 2022.
