= Tre'r Ceiri =

Archaeological site in Wales

Coordinates: 52.9745°N 4.4240°W

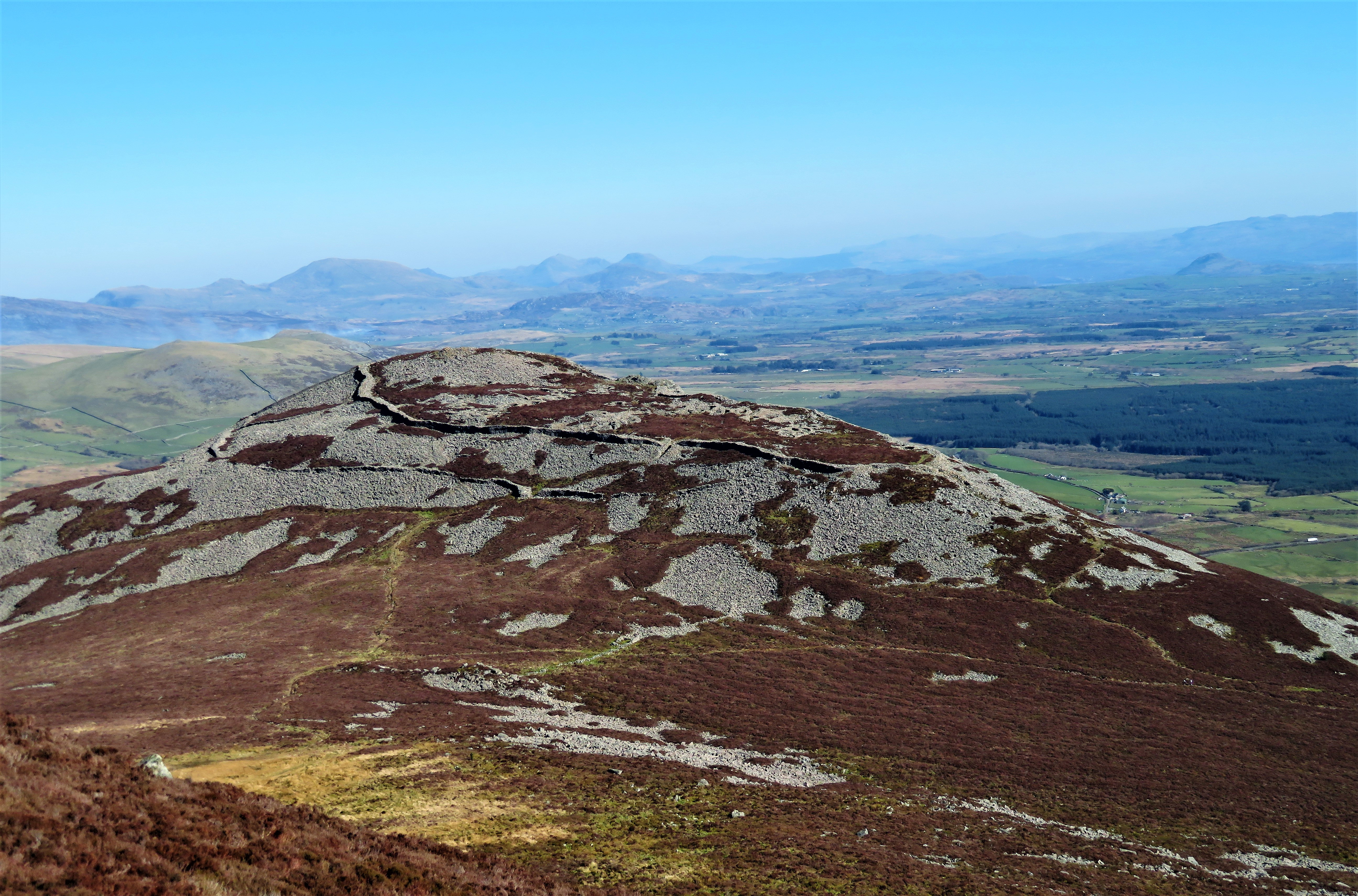
View of the fort from Garn Ganol, the upper peak of Yr Eifl

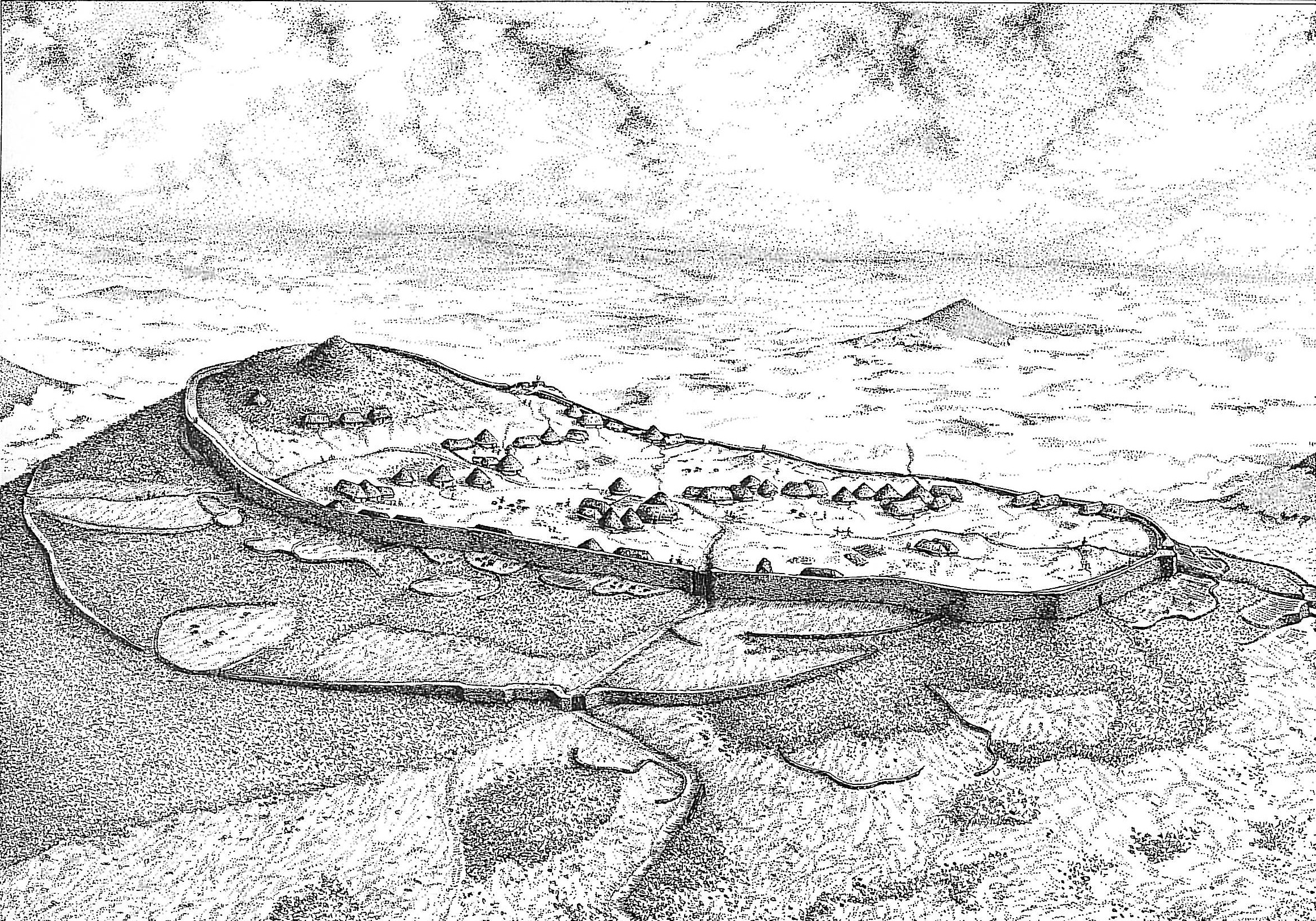
Reconstruction

Tre'r Ceiri (Welsh pronunciation: [treːr ˈkɛiri]) is a hillfort dating back to the Iron Age. The name means "town of the giants", from cewri, plural of cawr, "giant". The settlement is 450 metres (1,480 ft) above sea level on the slopes of Yr Eifl, a mountain on the north coast of the Llŷn Peninsula in Gwynedd, north-western Wales. Evidence suggests the fort was first built around 200 BC, though most of the archaeological finds date from AD 150–400, showing the site continued as a settlement during the Roman occupation.

Tre'r Ceiri is one of the most spectacular ancient monuments in Wales. The settlement is surrounded by stone walls that are largely intact, and which reach up to 4 metres (13 ft) in some places. Within the walls are ruins of about 150 stone houses, which would have had turf roofs. During Roman times, it may have housed up to 400 people. Historian John Davies suggests that because the settlement is so far above sea level, the huts served as habitations for summer shepherds who also had winter dwellings in the lowlands.

In modern times it was first brought to popular attention by Thomas Pennant in his Tours of Wales. Its location and importance have attracted visitors for years. The hillfort has recently been the site of conservation work and footpath maintenance. An extensive survey was made in 1956.

== Gallery ==
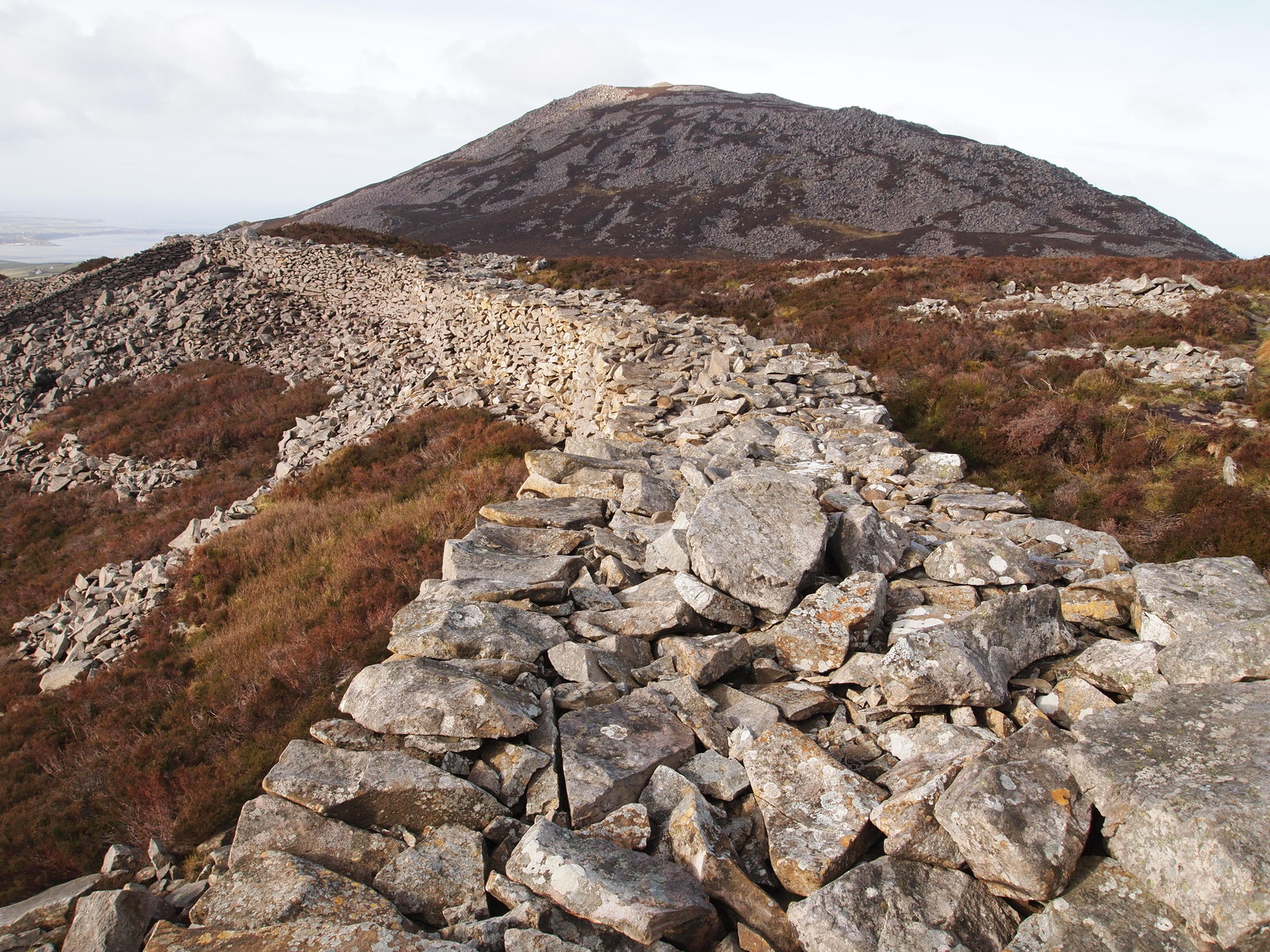

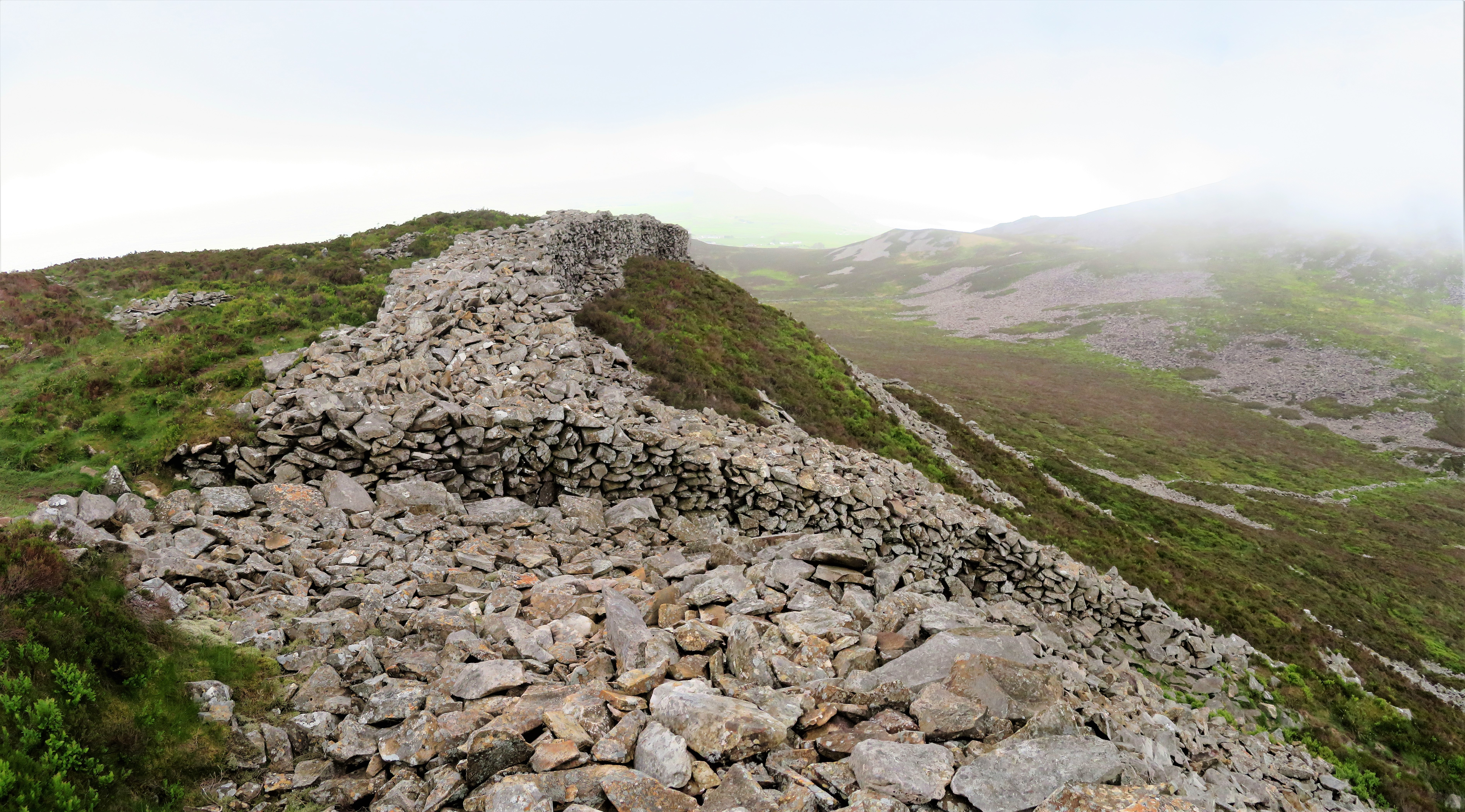

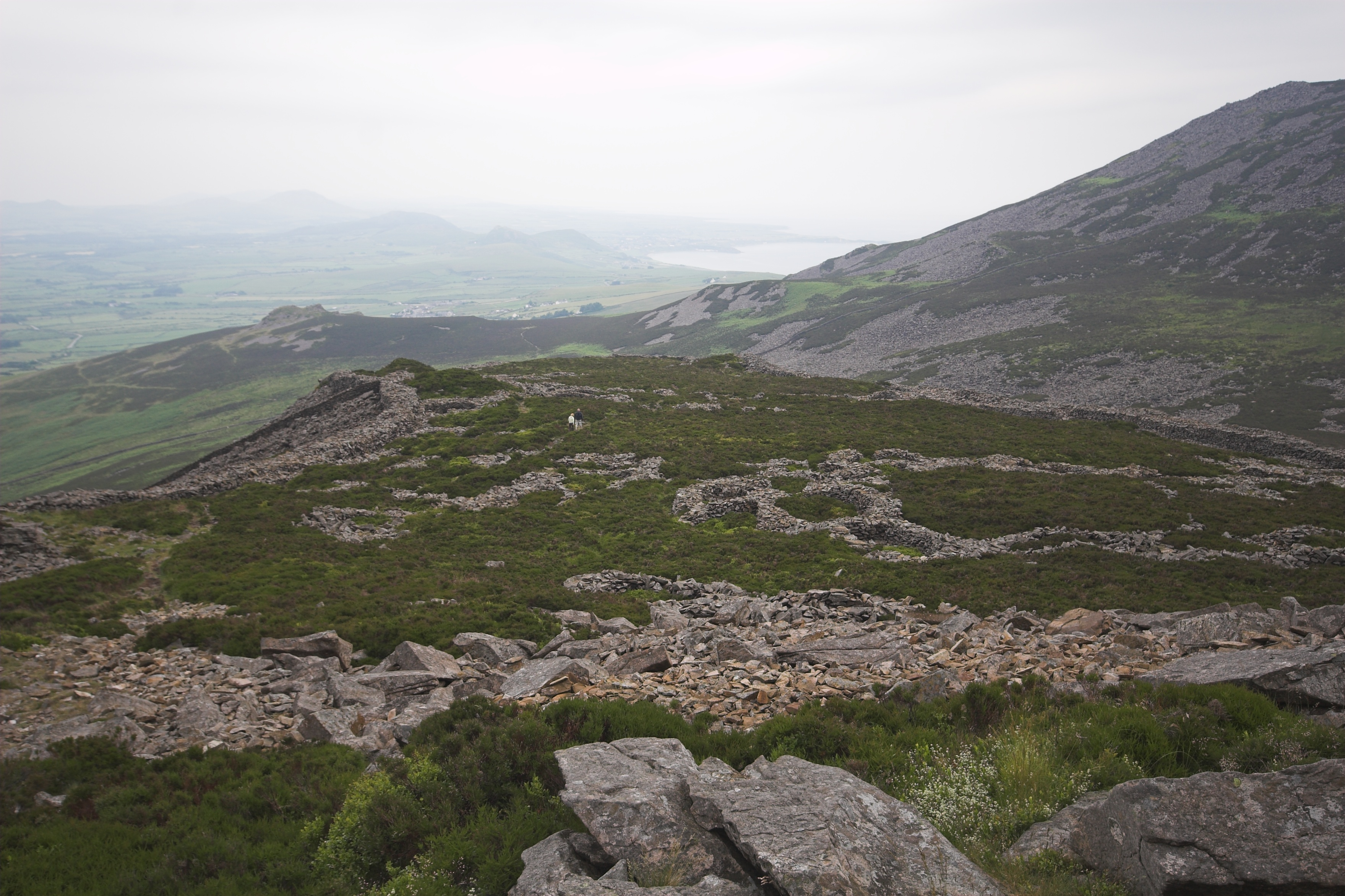

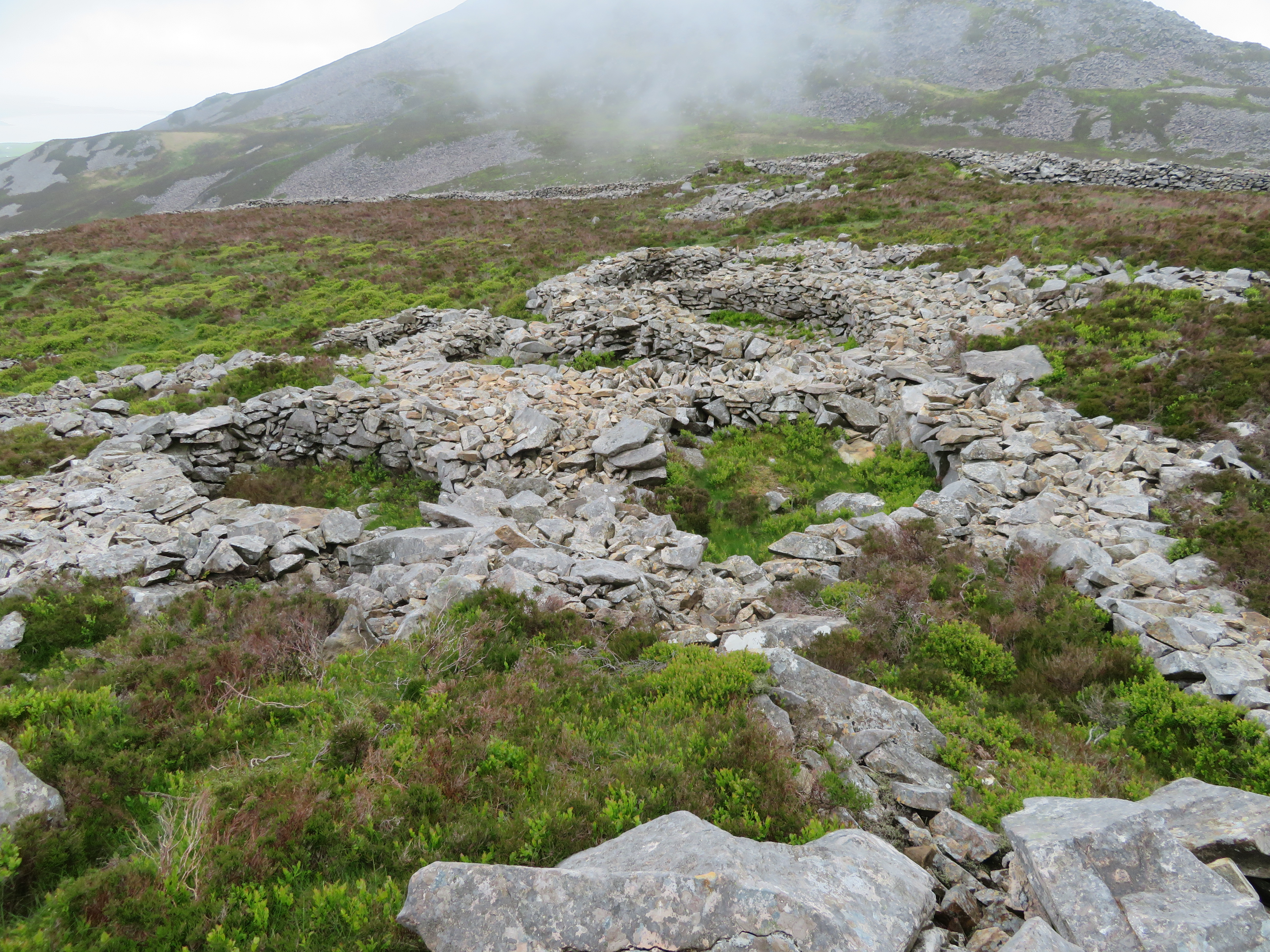

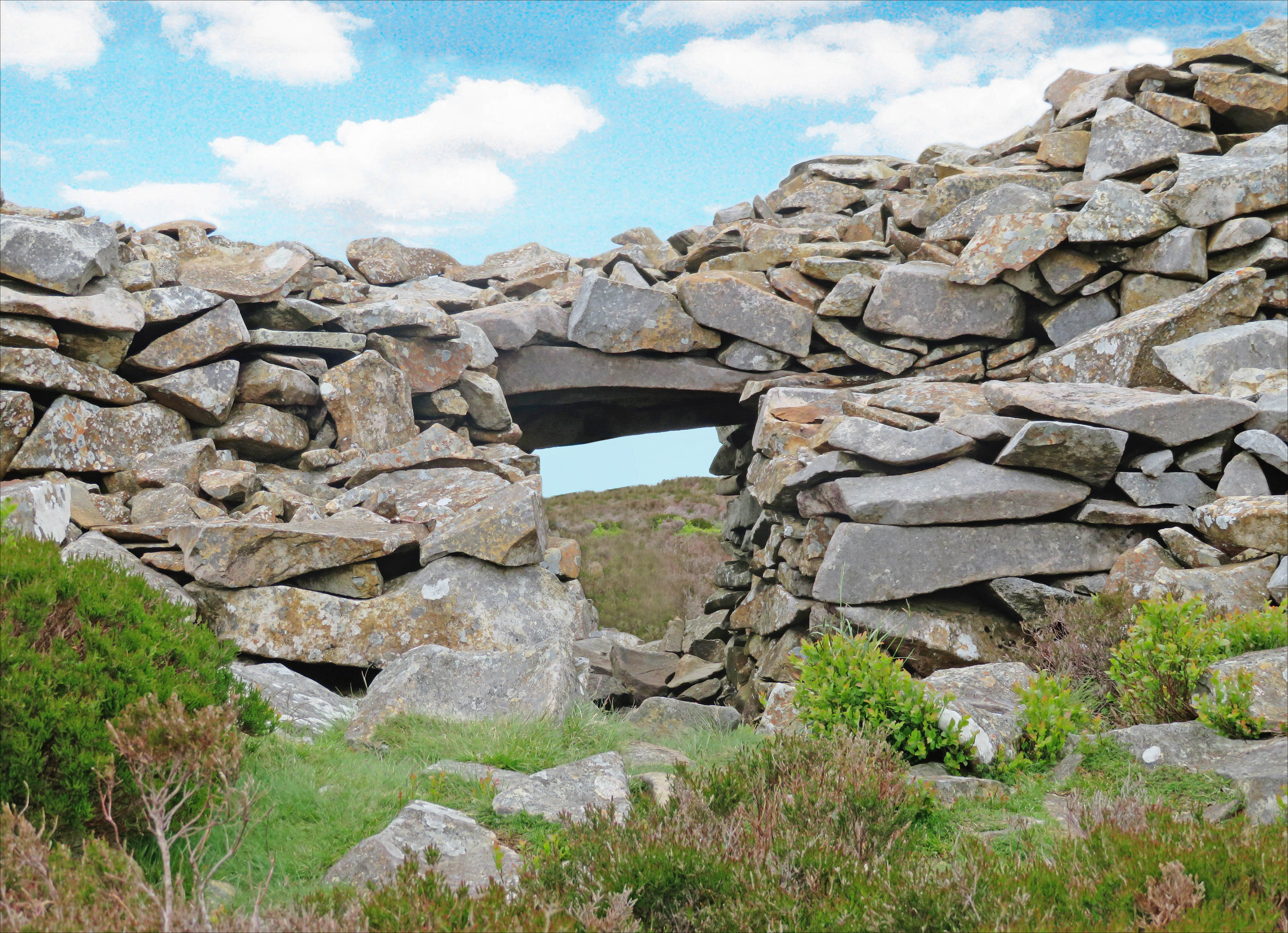

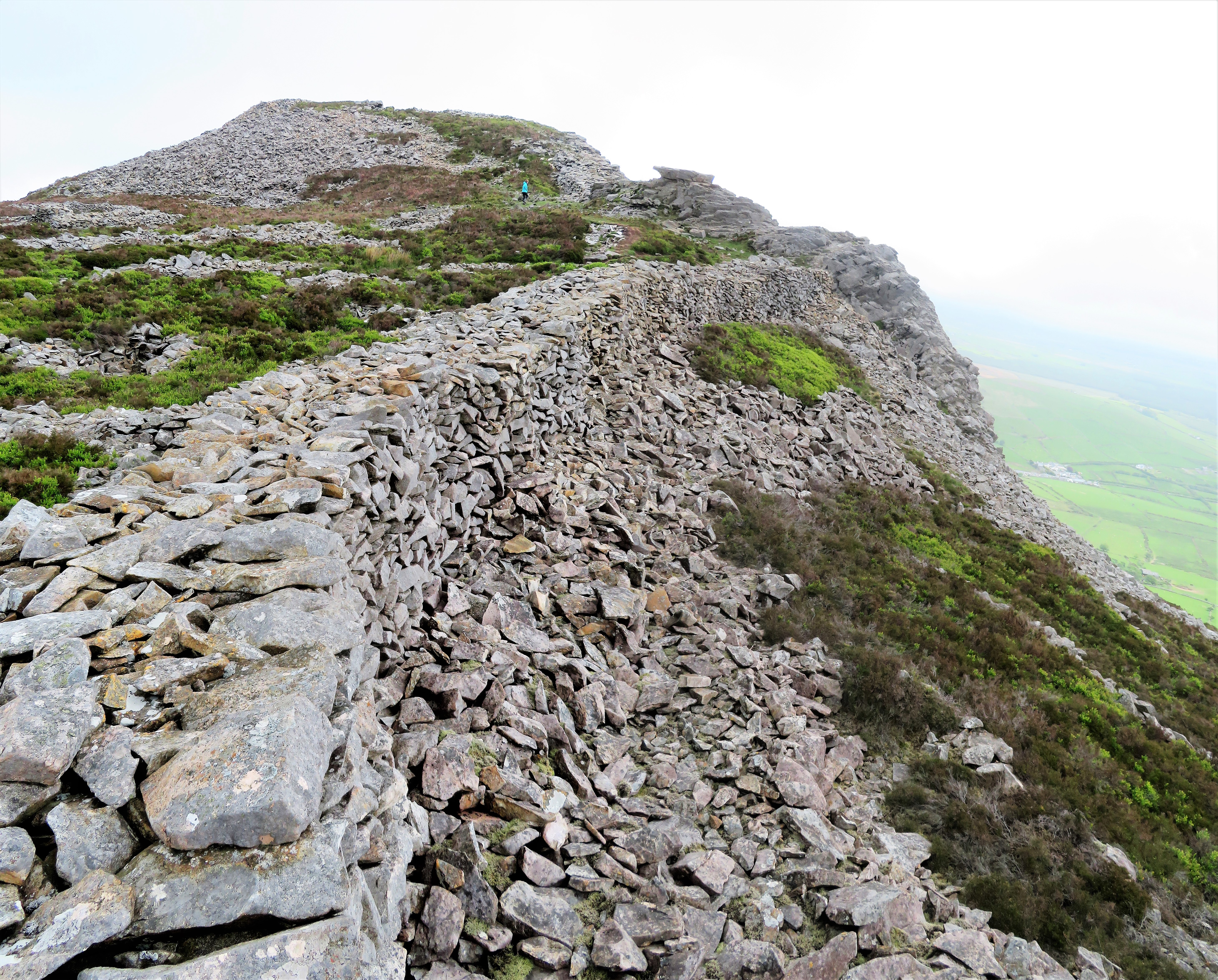

== See also ==
- List of hillforts in Wales
