= Seattle Japanese Garden =

Japanese garden in Seattle, United States

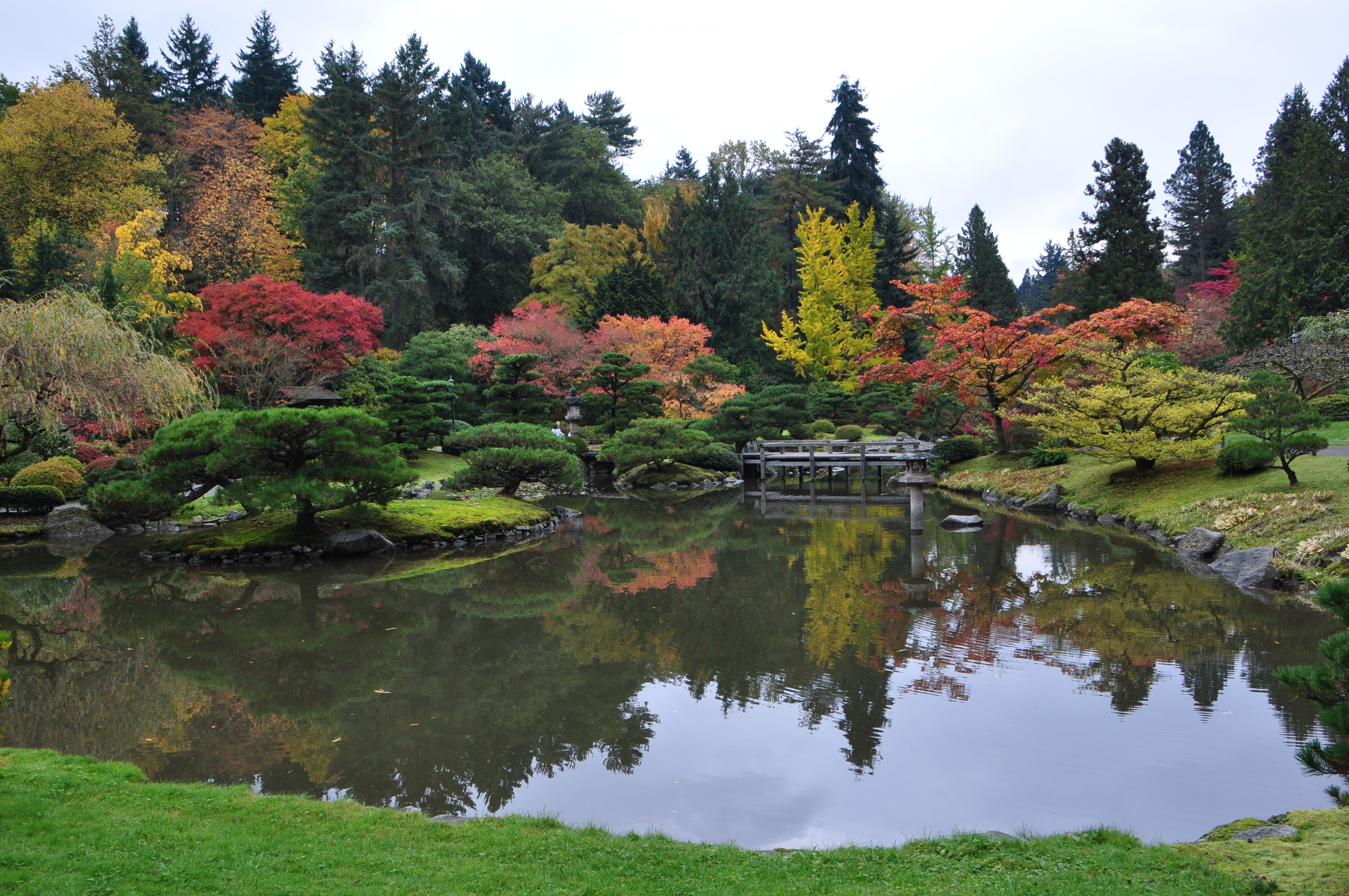
- Interactive map of Seattle Japanese Garden
- Type: Japanese garden
- Location: Seattle, Washington, United States
- Coordinates: 47.62915°N 122.29639°W
- Area: 3.5 acres (1.4 ha)
- Opened: 1960
- Status: Open to the public
- Website: seattlejapanesegarden.org

Seattle Landmark
- Designated: May 21, 2008

The Seattle Japanese Garden is a 3.5-acre (1.4 ha) Japanese garden in the Madison Park neighborhood of Seattle. The garden is located in the southern end of the Washington Park Arboretum on Lake Washington Boulevard East. The garden is one of the oldest Japanese gardens in North America, and is regarded as one of the most authentic Japanese gardens in the United States.

== History ==
Proposals to construct a Japanese garden in Seattle date back to the 1909 Alaska–Yukon–Pacific Exposition, which included a temporary Japanese Pavilion with a garden for the world's fair. The new Washington Park Arboretum was proposed as the site of the garden by 1937, but its construction was not undertaken at the time due to racial tensions and the onset of World War II. The Arboretum Foundation began fundraising for the project in 1957 ahead of the 1962 World's Fair and consulted with Japanese diplomats based in Seattle to solicit donations and potential designs. Fujitaro Kubota, a local gardener and landscaper who later donated Kubota Garden to the city, provided the initial cost estimates to the foundation. A team of six landscape architects and designers, led by Kiyoshi Inoshita and Juki Iida, were selected by the Tokyo Metropolitan Government and presented their plans for the Seattle garden in 1958.

Iida selected Japanese American contractors for the project due to their familiarity with the Japanese language and aesthetics; they included William Yorozu for plants, Richard Yamasaki for stone setting, and Kei Ishimitsu for garden structures. The teahouse was gifted to the city by the Tokyo government and shipped in pieces in March 1959; it was assembled for temporary display at a trade fair the following month before construction of its permanent home began on May 19. The first tea ceremony was conducted on July 4, 1959, by visiting Urasenke grand master Sen Sōshitsu XV.

Construction began in late 1959 and used primarily local materials, including 600 short tons (540,000 kg) of granite boulders from Bandera Mountain that were selected by Iida during a trip to the Snoqualmie Pass area. The boulders ranged in size from 1,000 pounds to 11 tons and were wrapped in bamboo matting to be transported to Seattle. They were arranged to complement a variety of culturally appropriate azaleas, rhododendrons, camellias, mosses, and ferns that were planted beginning in March 1960; some 100 flowering trees were donated by members of the public, primarily from Japanese American associations. The garden was dedicated by Seattle mayor Gordon S. Clinton on June 5, 1960.

During their October 1960 stop in Seattle, the Japanese Crown Prince Akihito and Crown Princess Michiko visited the newly opened garden. Together, they planted a cherry tree and a white birch, the latter a symbol (o-shirushi) of the Princess's family. Access to the garden was initially free until turnstiles with a 10-cent fee were installed in May 1961.

The original teahouse was burned by vandals on April 9, 1973, and reconstructed by Yasunori "Fred" Sugita in 1980 and 1981. It took eight years for the Arboretum Foundation to raise $175,000, with assistance from the Urasenke Foundation, until the teahouse was ready to be rebuilt. The teahouse was rededicated by Sen Sōshitsu XV on May 16, 1981, and named "Shoseian".

The garden has undertaken several other infrastructure improvements, including a new gatehouse and community meeting room. Several paths were modified to comply with wheelchair accessibility requirements in the late 1990s. The garden underwent a major renovation from 2001 to 2002 to restore the eroded pond and replace deteriorating bridges and plants. The Gatehouse project was completed in 2009. The new structure includes a bronze gate designed by a local Seattle sculptor Gerard Tsutakawa. As part of planning for the project, the garden was designated as a city historical landmark by the Seattle Landmarks Preservation Board on May 21, 2008.

The garden was awarded the Japanese Foreign Minister's Commendation for its contributions to the promotion of mutual understanding between Japan and the United States on December 1, 2020.

== Cultural events ==
The Seattle Japanese Garden hosts several cultural celebrations throughout the year, including:

- Kodomo no Hi (Children's Day)
- Tanabata
- Wondering and Wandering
- Otsukimi (Moon Viewing)
- Keiro no Hi (Respect for Elders Day)
- Momijigari (Maple Viewing)

These special cultural events feature local performers, including calligraphers, taiko ensembles, dance troupes, and traditional musicians.

== Community partners ==
The Seattle Japanese Garden is a partnership between the City of Seattle, the Associated Recreation Council (The Seattle Japanese Garden Advisory Council) and the Washington Park Arboretum.

== See also ==
- History of the Japanese in Seattle
- Seattle Chinese Garden
