= Fujitaro Kubota =

Japanese-born American gardener and philanthropist

Fujitaro Kubota (Japanese: 窪田 藤太郎, 1879–1973) was a Japanese-born American gardener and philanthropist.

Kubota was among the Issei emigrants from Japan who made new lives for themselves in the United States, arriving in the country in 1906. During his first years in the country, he worked in a sawmill and on a farm. By 1923, he was able to start his own gardening business in Seattle. In 1927, he began work on a small garden as a hobby; and the task would assume an important role in the rest of his life and that of his children and grandchildren. Over time, the property expanded to 20 acres.

Kubota and his family were interned at Camp Minidoka in Idaho during World War II, following the signing of Executive Order 9066. The Kubota family was eventually allowed to return to Seattle, and it took nearly four years to restore the garden to its former state. Kubota restarted the family landscaping business and later focused on garden design and construction rather than garden maintenance. He and his son Tom helped contribute to the design of gardens in the Pacific Northwest including the Bloedel Reserve on Bainbridge Island and Seattle University’s campus. They also provided a cost estimate for the creation of the Seattle Japanese Garden.

== Honors ==
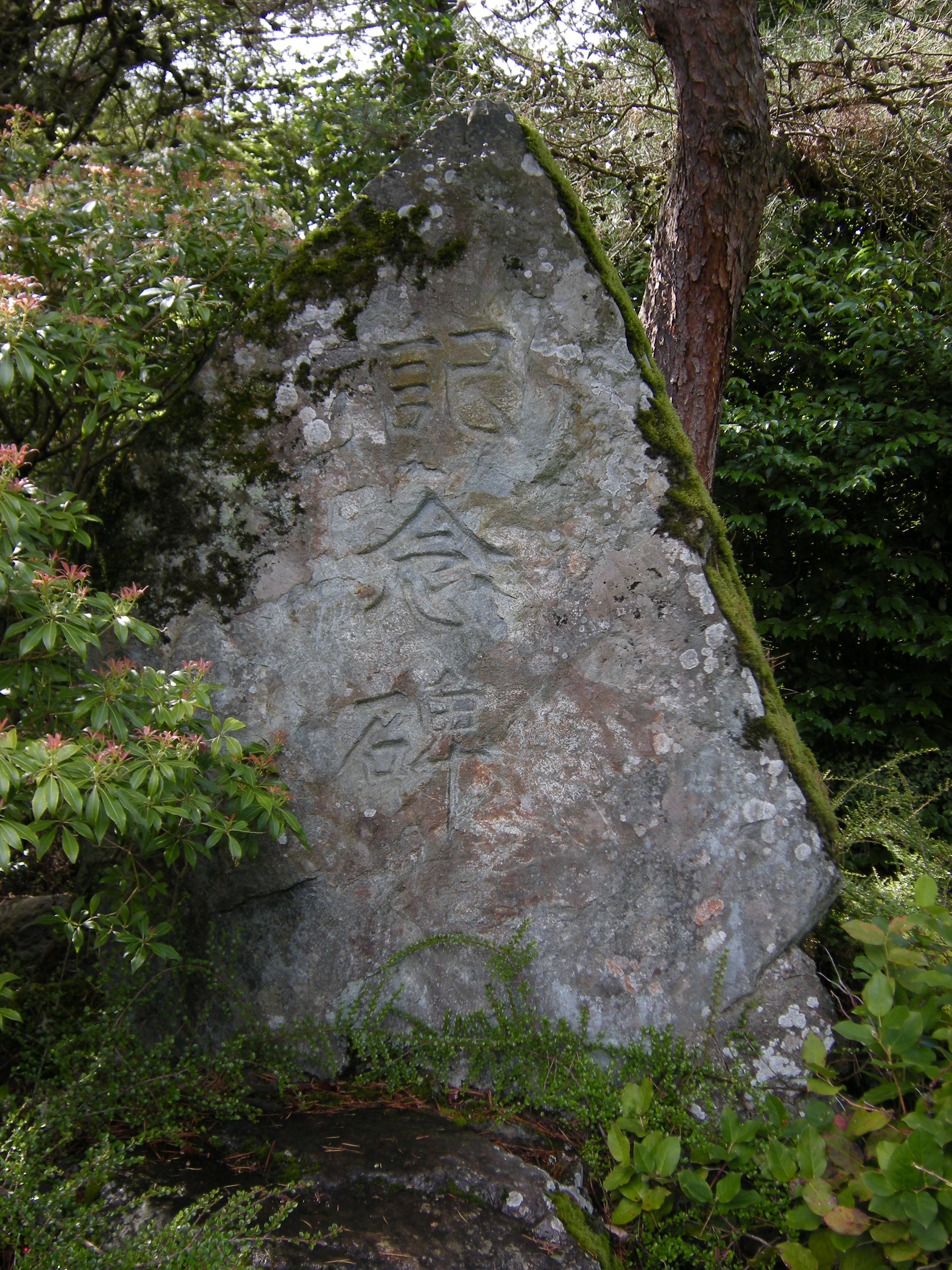
Rock with inscription at Kubota Garden at Seattle, Washington. The Japanese kanji inscribed into the surface means "monument" (記念碑).

In the year before his death, the Japanese government honored this lifelong gardener by presenting him with the Order of the Sacred Treasure with Gold and Silver Rays "for his achievements in his adopted country, for introducing and building respect for Japanese Gardening." The formal decoration badge is a Maltese cross in gilt and silver which was produced by the Japan Mint.

The public garden which bears Kubota's name is no less significant as a monument to Kubota's life.

== See also ==
- Kubota Garden, Rainier Beach neighborhood in south Seattle
- Bloedel Reserve, Bainbridge Island
