= Mapes Creek =

Stream in Seattle, Washington, U.S.

Location
- Country: United States
- State: Washington
- City: Seattle

Physical characteristics
- Mouth
  - coordinates: 47.5237°N 122.2627°W

Mapes Creek is a stream in the Rainier Beach neighborhood of Seattle, Washington, United States. It runs through Kubota Garden and Beer Sheva Park on its way to Lake Washington.
