= Dunlap, Seattle =

Neighborhood in Seattle, Washington, U.S.

Coordinates: 47°31′34″N 122°16′27″W

Dunlap
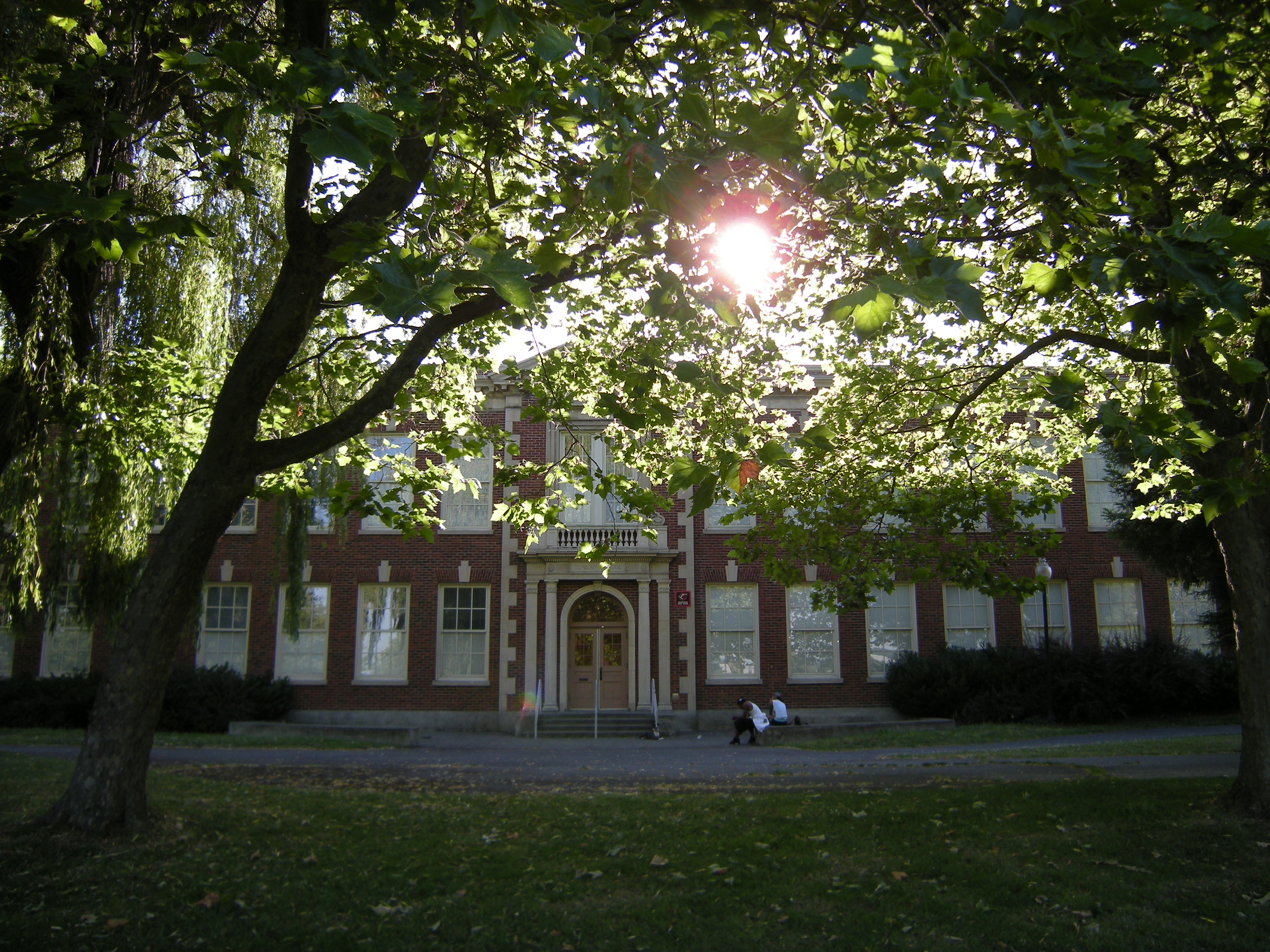
- Dunlap Elementary School
- Interactive map of Dunlap
- Country: United States
- City: Seattle, Washington

Dunlap is a neighborhood in southern Seattle, Washington, just north of Rainier Beach. It is home to Dunlap Elementary School, part of the Seattle Public Schools. Dunlap is named after Joseph Dunlap, the first homesteader in the area.
