= Sam Smith Park =

Public park in Seattle, Washington, U.S.

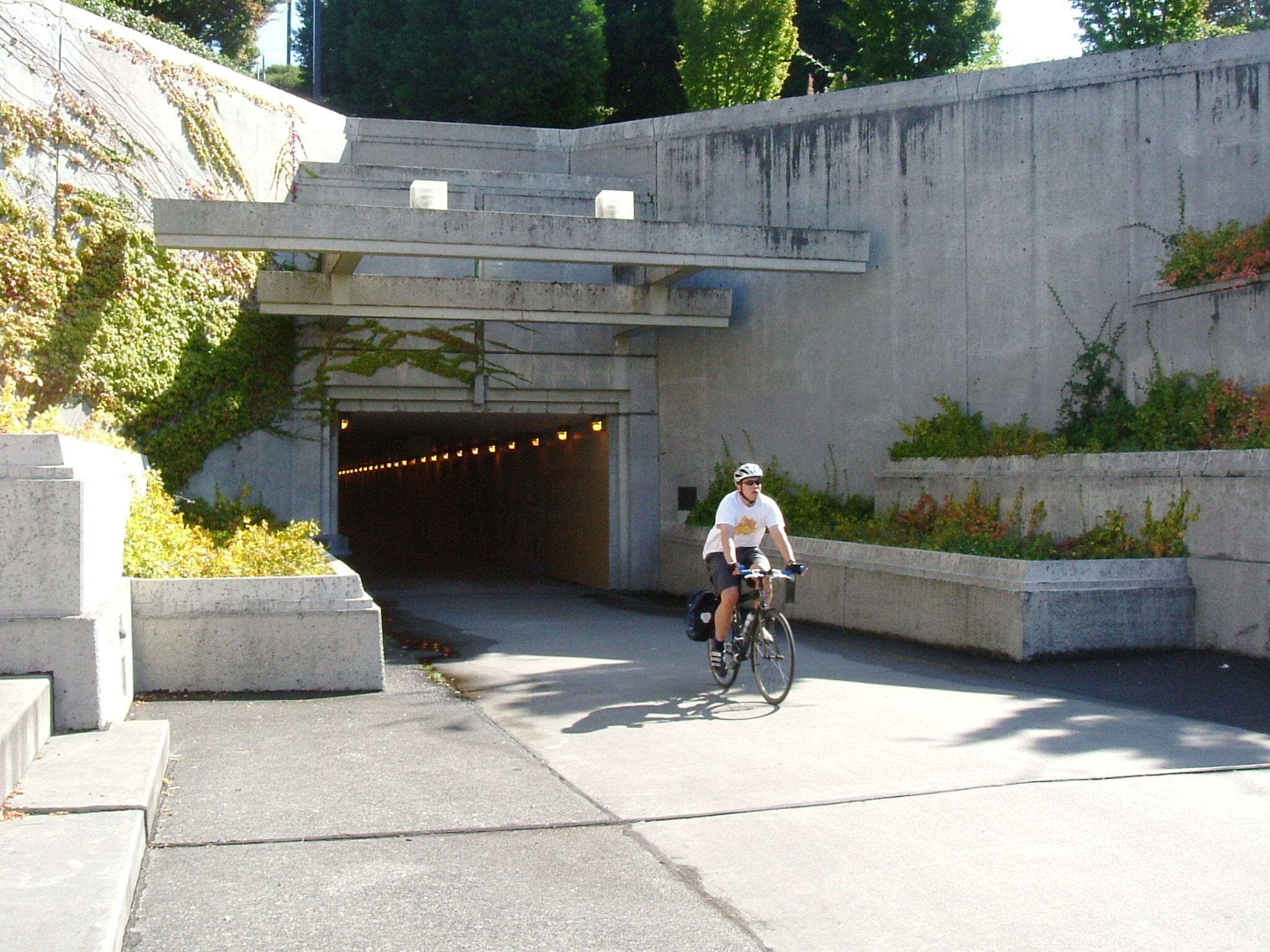
- I-90 bike tunnel, 2003
- Interactive map of Sam Smith Park
- Location: Seattle, Washington, U.S.
- Coordinates: 47°35′23″N 122°17′53″W

Sam Smith Park is a public park operated by Seattle Parks and Recreation, in Seattle, Washington, United States. The park has a bicycle and pedestrian tunnel integrated with the Mount Baker Tunnel. Exercise equipment, tennis courts, a children's play area, and picnic tables are also available. The park hosts the statue Urban Peace Circle, by Seattle sculptor Gerard Tsutakawa. It is dedicated to the city's youth who have been killed by gun violence.

The park was named after Sam Smith in September 1998, based on nominations from the Washington Black Heritage Society, Urban League of Greater Seattle, and private citizens. Smith was a local politician dedicated to civil rights and racial justice. He was the first Black member of Seattle City Council, and the second Black member of the Washington State Legislature, serving five terms in each body.

== See also ==
- List of parks in Seattle
