= The Mitt =

Sculpture by Japanese artist Gerard Tsutakawa in Seattle, Washington, U.S.

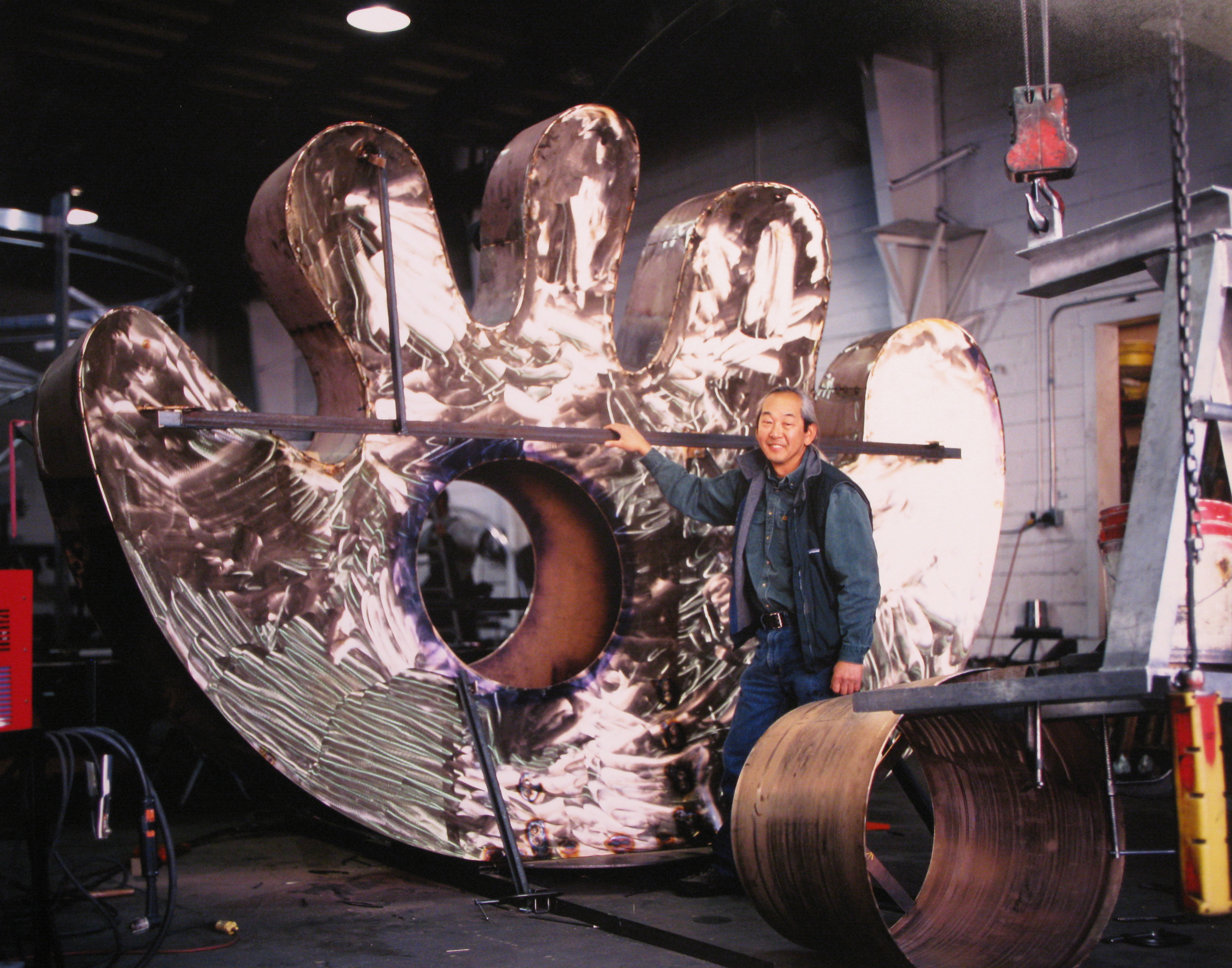
- Artist: Gerard Tsutakawa
- Year: 1999
- Medium: Bronze sculpture
- Subject: Baseball glove
- Location: Seattle, Washington, U.S.
- 47°35′32.0″N 122°20′01.8″W

The Mitt (stylized as The "Mitt") is an abstract bronze sculpture by Gerard Tsutakawa, installed outside the left field entrance of T-Mobile Park in Seattle, Washington.

== Description ==
The Mitt is installed outside T-Mobile Park (formerly Safeco Field) in Seattle's SoDo neighborhood. The bronze sculpture is 9 feet tall and approximately 12 feet wide. It depicts a baseball glove with a hole (or "abstract circular opening") in the middle.

According to the Seattle Mariner's website, "Near the center of the glove an aperture appears as an abstract symbol representing a ball nestled in the leather, or a hole where a fastball burned through. The sculpture is placed outside the gates to allow fans to touch, lean on, or crawl through the work, giving the public a feeling of ownership of the piece." The artwork has become a "beloved spot for selfies, family portraits and meet ups", according to KUOW-FM's Marcie Sillman.

== History ==
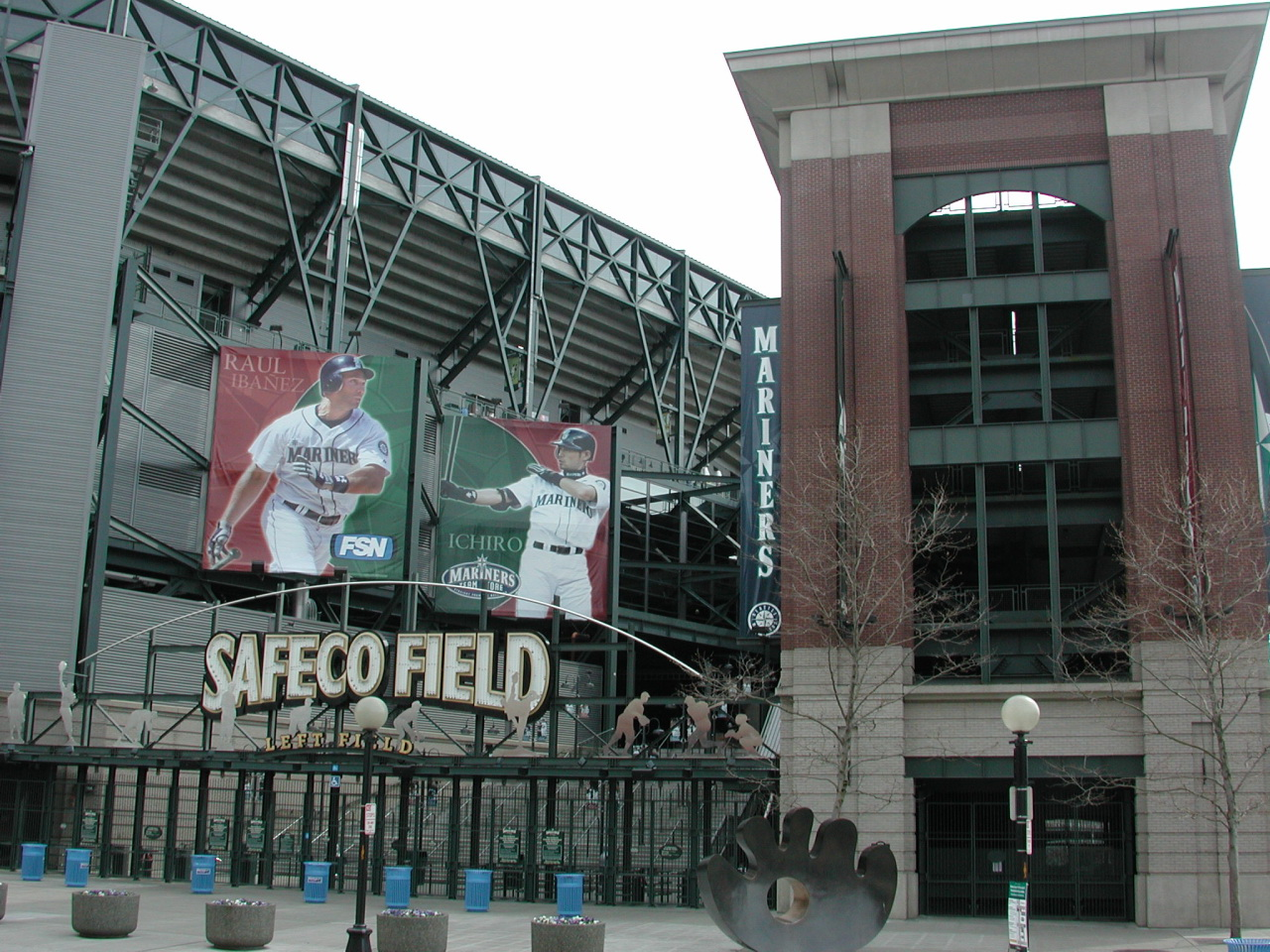
The sculpture outside Safeco Field (now T-Mobile Park) in 2008

The artwork was commissioned and created in 1999. It is washed and polished annually.

== Reception ==
The work has been described as "iconic". In 2017, Marcie Sillman of KUOW-FM wrote, "Seattleites have indeed embraced this sculpture; its surface is worn away in the spots where people climb on it to have their pictures taken. The Mitt has become a city icon, like the Fremont Troll or the Pike Place Market pig [Rachel]."

Tsutakawa has credited the work for boosting his career. According to Sillman, "The sculpture's success helped propel Gerry Tsutakawa into the public eye, earning him more art commissions. But it also helped establish him on an equal artistic footing with another Tsutakawa: his late father George. It also revealed the differences between Gerry's often whimsical world view and his father's more contemplative artwork."
