= Kubota Garden =

Japanese garden in Seattle, Washington, U.S.

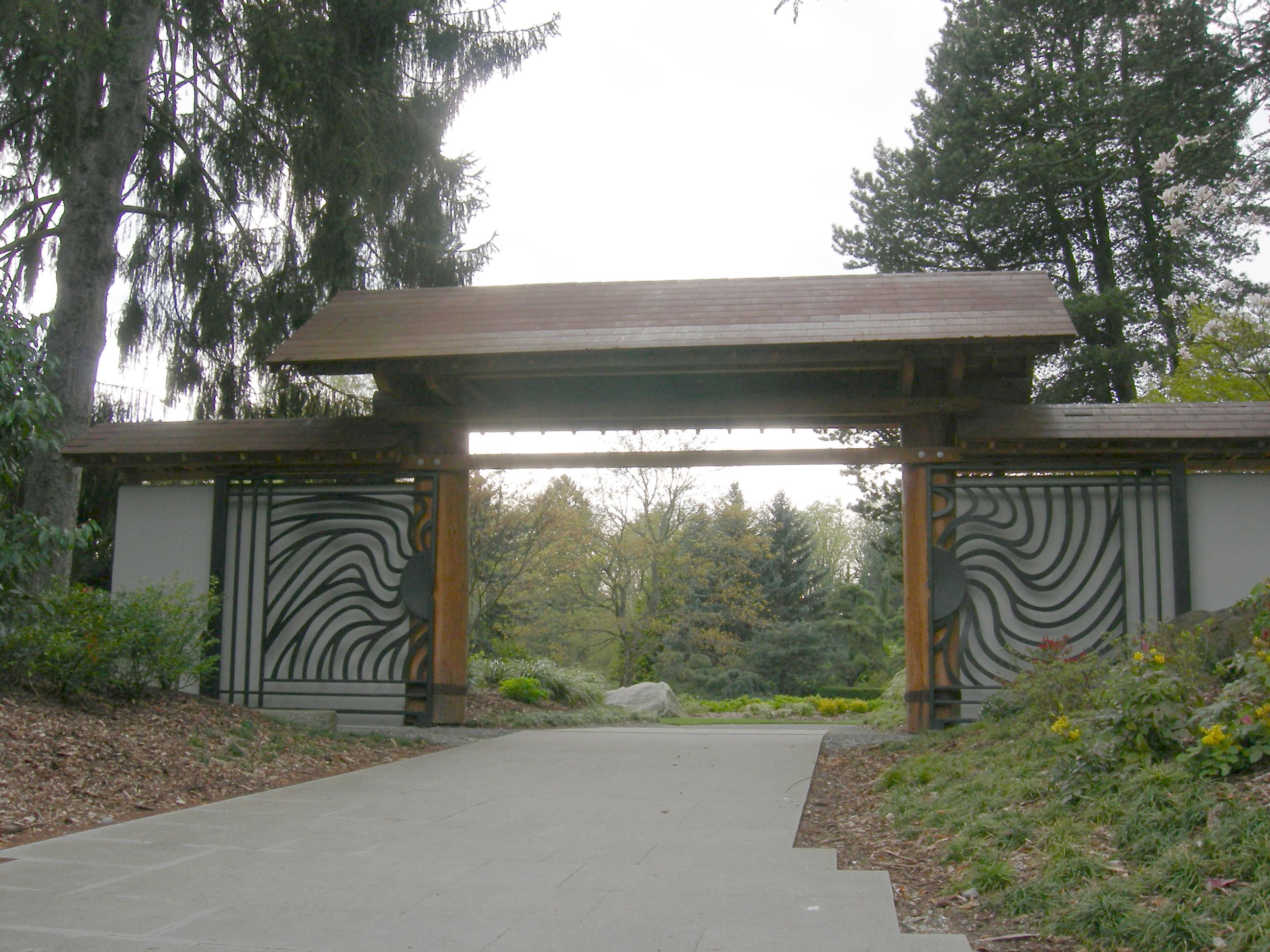
- View towards the Kubota Garden gate.
- Interactive map of Kubota Garden
- Type: Public Garden
- Location: Rainier Beach, Seattle
- Coordinates: 47°30′45″N 122°16′00″W
- Area: 20 acres (81,000 m^{2})
- Established: 1987; 39 years ago
- Founder: Fujitaro Kubota
- Website: kubotagarden.org/index.html

Kubota Garden is a 20-acre (81,000 m^{2}) Japanese garden in the Rainier Beach neighborhood of Seattle, Washington. A public park since 1987, it was started in 1927 by Fujitaro Kubota, a Japanese emigrant. Today, it is maintained as a public park by the Seattle Parks and Recreation and the Kubota Garden Foundation.

== History ==
Fujitaro Kubota emigrated from Shikoku, Japan in 1907 and established the Kubota Gardening Company in 1923. Projects of his included the garden at Seattle University and the Japanese garden at Bloedel Reserve in Bainbridge Island. In 1927, he bought 5 acres (20,000 m^{2}) of swampland in Rainier Beach with the help of a friend, as he was not able to make the purchase because of his Japanese descent. In 1930, he went on to increase the size of the garden to 30 acres (120,000 m^{2}). Kubota Garden served as cultural center for the Japanese community in Seattle, as well as a home, office and nursery for his business. During World War II, Kubota Garden was abandoned for four years as Kubota and his family were interned at Camp Minidoka in Idaho. During his internment, Kubota supervised the building of a community park, which included a Japanese rock garden. After the war, he and his sons Tak and Tom Kubota rebuilt the business.

The Japanese government awarded Kubota the Fifth Class Order of the Sacred Treasure in 1972 "for his achievements in his adopted country, for introducing and building respect for Japanese Gardening in this area." Kubota maintained the garden until his death in 1973.

In 1981, the Seattle Landmarks Preservation Board declared the core 4.5 acres (18,000 m^{2}) of the park to be a historical landmark of the City of Seattle. In 1987, the City of Seattle bought the garden from the Kubota family, and it is now maintained by the Department of Parks and Recreation as well as volunteers from the Kubota Garden Foundation.

In addition, 17 acres (69,000 m^{2}) surrounding the park has been purchased by the Open Space Program in the City of Seattle in order to protect Mapes Creek, which runs through the park. The Tom Kubota Stroll Garden broke ground in 1999 and was opened in 2000. The garden received a new entrance gate designed by Gerard Tsutakawa in 2004.

A community newspaper noted in 1995 that the garden was being abused after staff left for the day, including graffiti and beer bottles being left behind.

In 2020, the book "Spirited Stone: Lesson's From Kubota's Garden" was released, entailing the importance of Kubota's legacy through the stories of novelists, poets, and garden enthusiasts.

== Kubota Garden Foundation ==
The Kubota Garden Foundation is a non-profit 501(c)(3) organization founded in 1989 to "support, enhance, and perpetuate the Kubota Garden within the spirit and vision of Fujitaro Kubota." Kubota's vision included opening the garden to the public and increasing American understanding and appreciation of Japanese Gardens. The foundation provides additional fundraising, volunteer work, and publications to support the garden.

== Features and programs ==
The garden is open to the public every day during daylight hours all year round. School children, senior groups, tourists, and garden clubs make up a large portion of their audience. The fourth Saturday between April and October, the Kubota Garden holds a public tour.

Major features of the Kubota Garden include the Kubota Terrace, the Bamboo Grove, the Necklace of Ponds, the Mountainside, and the Tom Kubota Stroll Garden.

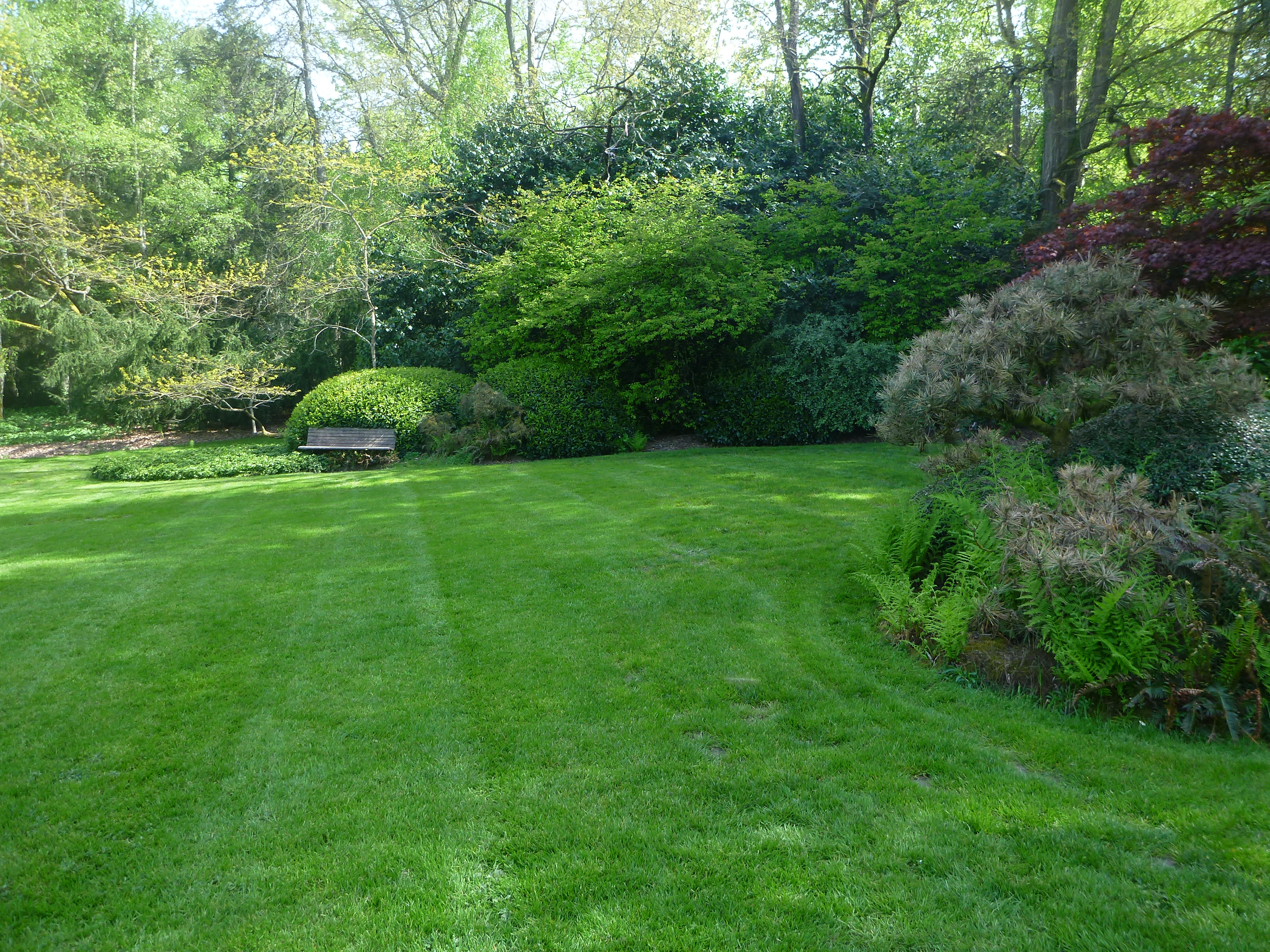
Kubota Terrace

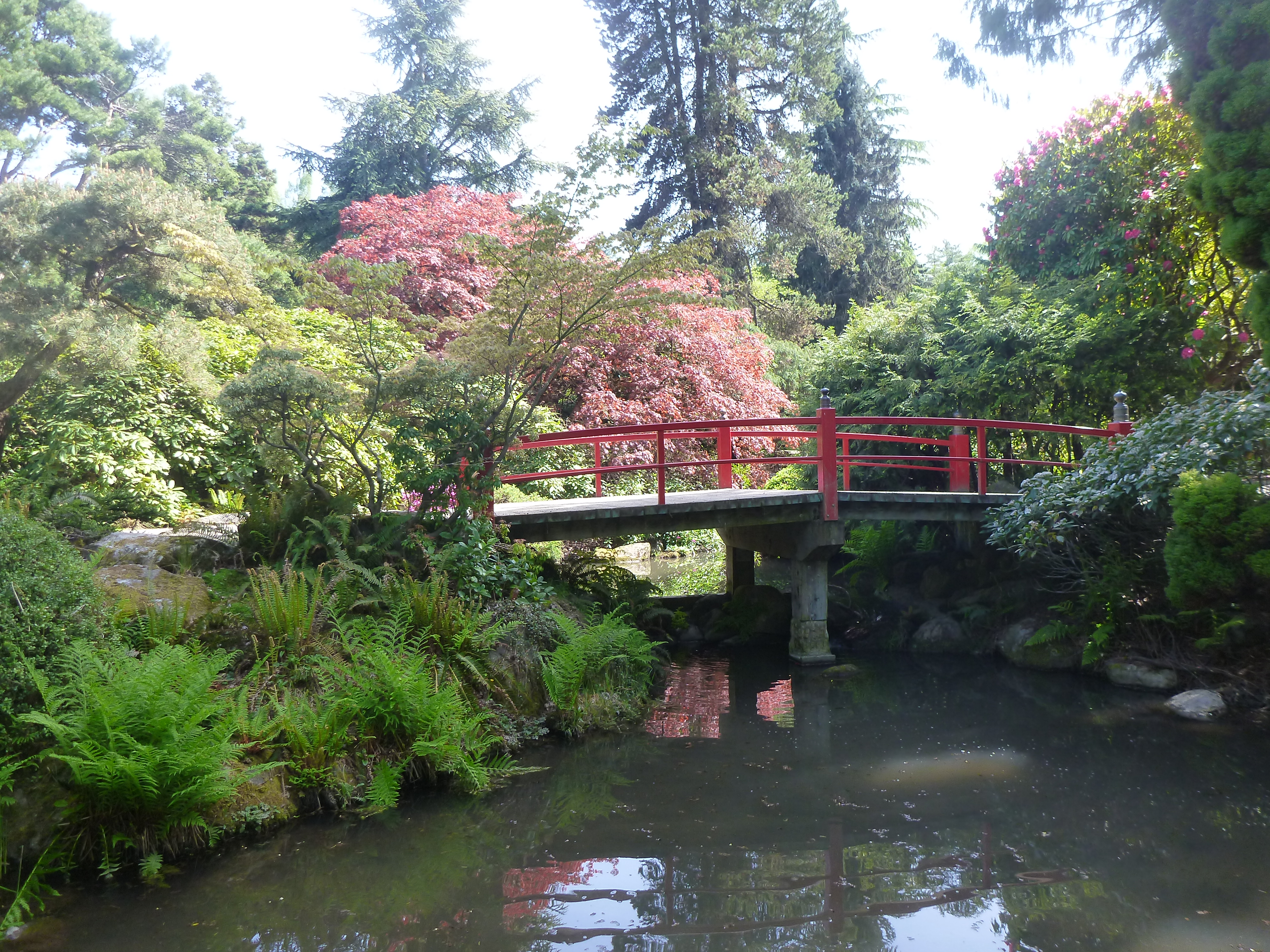
Heart Bridge

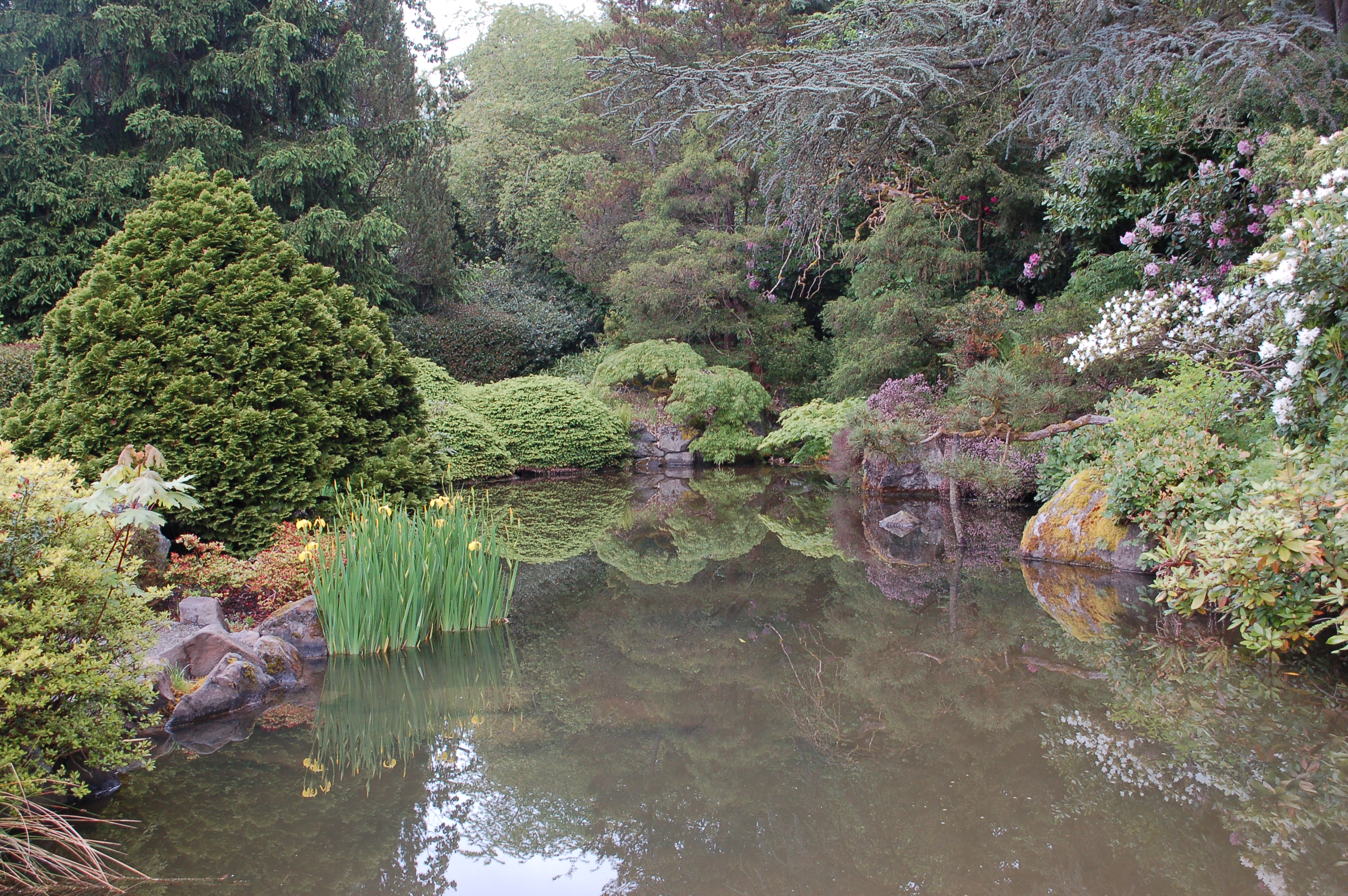
Mapes Creek

== Flora ==
Kubota Garden contains a variety of trees and plants including Kuretake (Phyllostachys nigra or Black Bamboo), Japanese Maple (Acer palmatum), Blue Atlas Cedar (Cedrus atlanticus Glauca), and Norway Spruce (Picea abies).

Kuretake: Native to the Hunan Province of China, this plant (also known as Black Bamboo) grows in an upright position to about 20 to 35 feet. The dark green, yellow, and black colors are the main source of attraction, as they are popularly used for decorative wood working.

Japanese Maple: Growing anywhere between 8 and 30 feet tall, the Japanese Maple is known for its color changes throughout the seasons—ranging from earthier tones of green and brown to warmer colors of red and orange.

Blue Atlas Cedar: The Blue Atlas Cedar gets its name from the blue pigmentation of its leaves; a needled evergreen tree that grows anywhere between 40 and 60 feet and can withstand extreme weather conditions such as droughts and treacherous winters.

Norway Spruce: The Norway Spruce (the fastest growing plant in the spruce family) grows to be about 40 to 60 feet high. The major attraction towards this tree is the homing of a variety of wildlife—anywhere from deer to a differentiation of bird species.

== Amenities and events ==
- The Tom Kubota Stroll Garden allows wheel chair accessibility to the Terrace Overlook. However, main pathways are not as accessible, as they are made with hard-packed gravel.
- Dogs allowed at the garden
- There are picnic tables and benches placed throughout the garden
- There are portable toilets near the entrance of the garden

Individuals can reserve the Terrace Overlook feature for events. Events may include: Wedding ceremonies, musical performances, family reunions, photoshoots, etc. During this time, the garden is still open to the public, but the specific area is closed off for the event. There is a group limitation of 150 guests and alcohol, and amplified sounds are prohibited.

== See also ==
- History of the Japanese in Seattle
