= Beer Sheva Park =

Park in Seattle, Washington, U.S.

Be'er Sheva Park
- Be'er Sheva Park, looking southeast over Lake Washington

- Location within Washington (state)
- Interactive map of Be'er Sheva Park
- Type: Playground, picnic, water access
- Coordinates: 47.5244°N 122.2635°W
- Area: 25.5 acres (10.3 ha)
- Created: 1905 (as Atlantic City Park)
- Status: Open
- Paths: Boardwalk and walking paths
- Terrain: Flat, waterfront
- Water: Lake Washington
- Collections: Murals and art panels
- Facilities: Performance stage

Be'er Sheva Park is a small 25.5-acre (10.3 ha) park located on Lake Washington in the Rainier Beach neighborhood of Seattle, Washington. Dedicated in 1905 as Atlantic City Park after the subdivision, it was renamed after Beer Sheva, Israel, in 1977, to honor Seattle's new sister city. In Beer Sheva, Israel, a "Seattle Park" was made in honor of Seattle's gesture.

The Rainier Beach community began upgrading the park in 2017 through local charitable efforts. In 2023, a various group of community members, the Seattle Parks Foundation, and local businesses and non-profits began raising funds for a $2.5 million renovation to the park. Considered a first of several phases of improvements, the plans include access to the waterfront, art installations, a boardwalk and lighted paths, and a stage for cultural performances. As of 2023, additional phases comprise shoreline habitat improvements and a playground.
