= Gerard Tsutakawa =

American sculptor (born 1947)

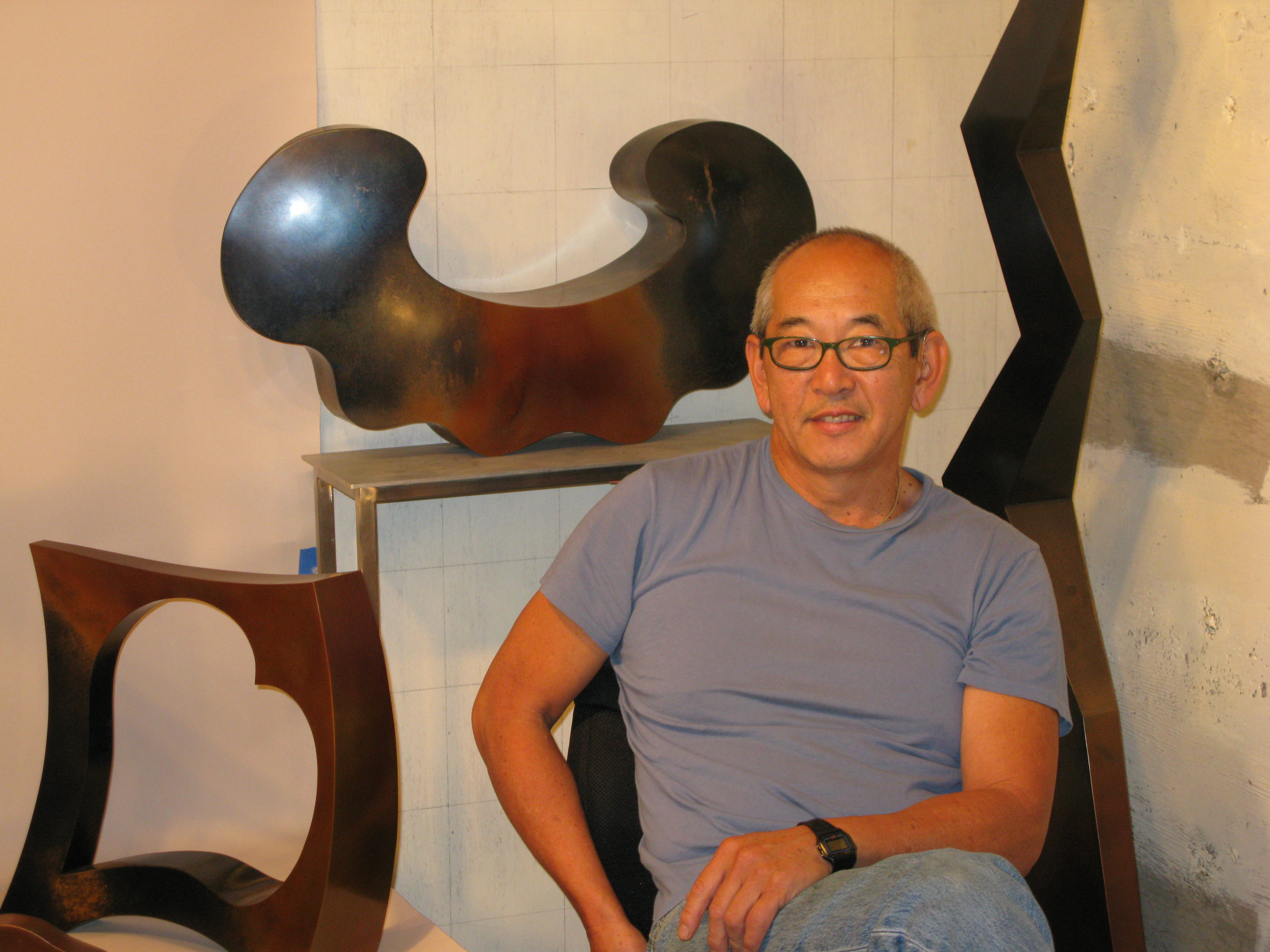
- Gerard Tsutakawa with some of his smaller artworks at home studio
- Born: 1947 (age 78–79); Seattle, Washington, United States
- Known for: Sculptor
- Father: George Tsutakawa
- Website: https://www.gerardtsutakawa.com

Gerard "Gerry" Tsutakawa (born 1947), son of artist George Tsutakawa, is an accomplished Pacific Northwest sculptor. A studio apprentice for his artist father for 20 years, Gerry created his own first commissioned work in 1976. In the same studio where his father worked, he continues to design and fabricate anything from small studio bronze pieces to large public art fountains and sculptures.

== History of artwork ==
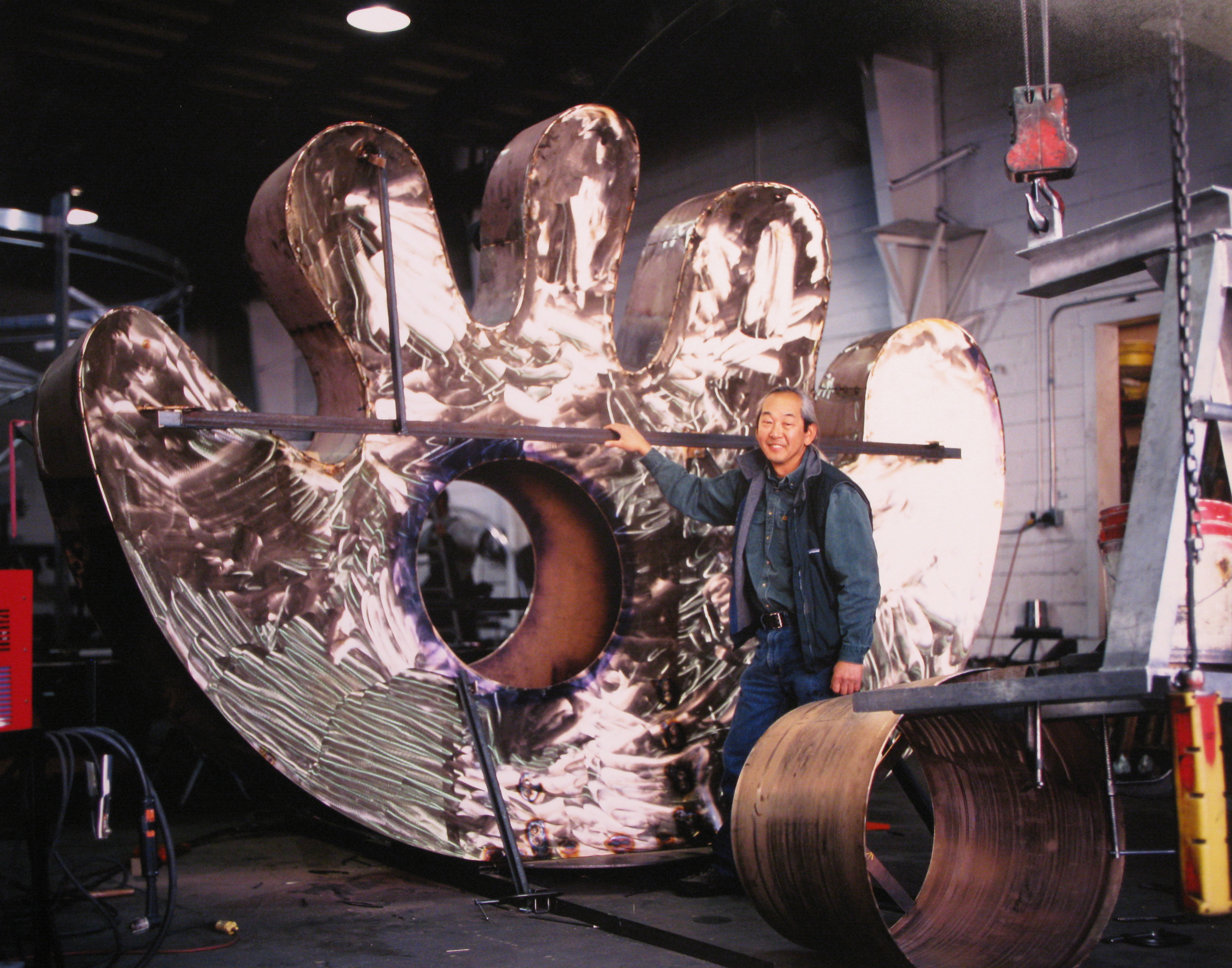
Tsutakawa with 9 foot bronze "The Mitt", later placed at Safeco Field left field entrance

Past sculpture projects include the Urban Peace Circle Memorial at Sam Smith Park in 1994, a collaboration with the Stop the Violence Committee where Tsutakawa contributed a 9-foot (2.7 m) bronze sculpture to the City of Seattle, in memory of youth who have died by handgun violence. In 1999, Tsutakawa created The Mitt for Safeco Field and in 2000 the Fountain of Seseragi at the Seattle Center.

Recent commissions include the Salish Sea Circle in Port Townsend, bronze entrance gates for Seattle Park’s Kubota Garden and the Washington Park Japanese garden, the Annie Curtis sculpture at the Port of Anacortes, Uzumaki Curve in St Louis, and Thunderbolt at Union Plaza in downtown Seattle.

Tsutakawa continues to work on public and private commissions around the Northwest and across the nation.
