= Rainier Beach, Seattle =

Neighborhood in Seattle, Washington, U.S.

- Seattle Neighborhood
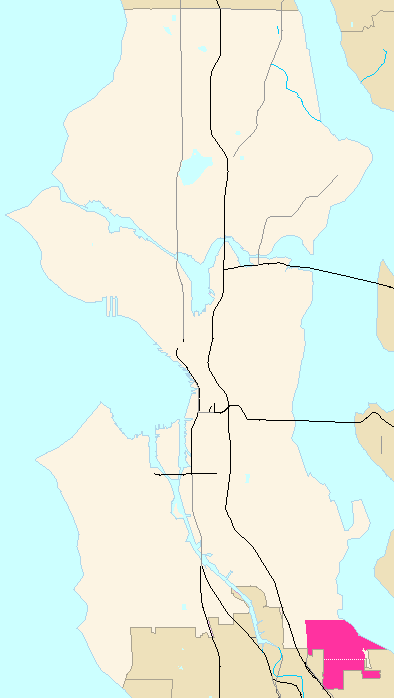
- Rainier Beach and Rainier View Highlighted in Pink
- Coordinates: 47°30′42″N 122°15′30″W
- Country: United States
- State: Washington
- County: King
- City: Seattle
- ZIP Code: 98118
- Area code: 206, 564

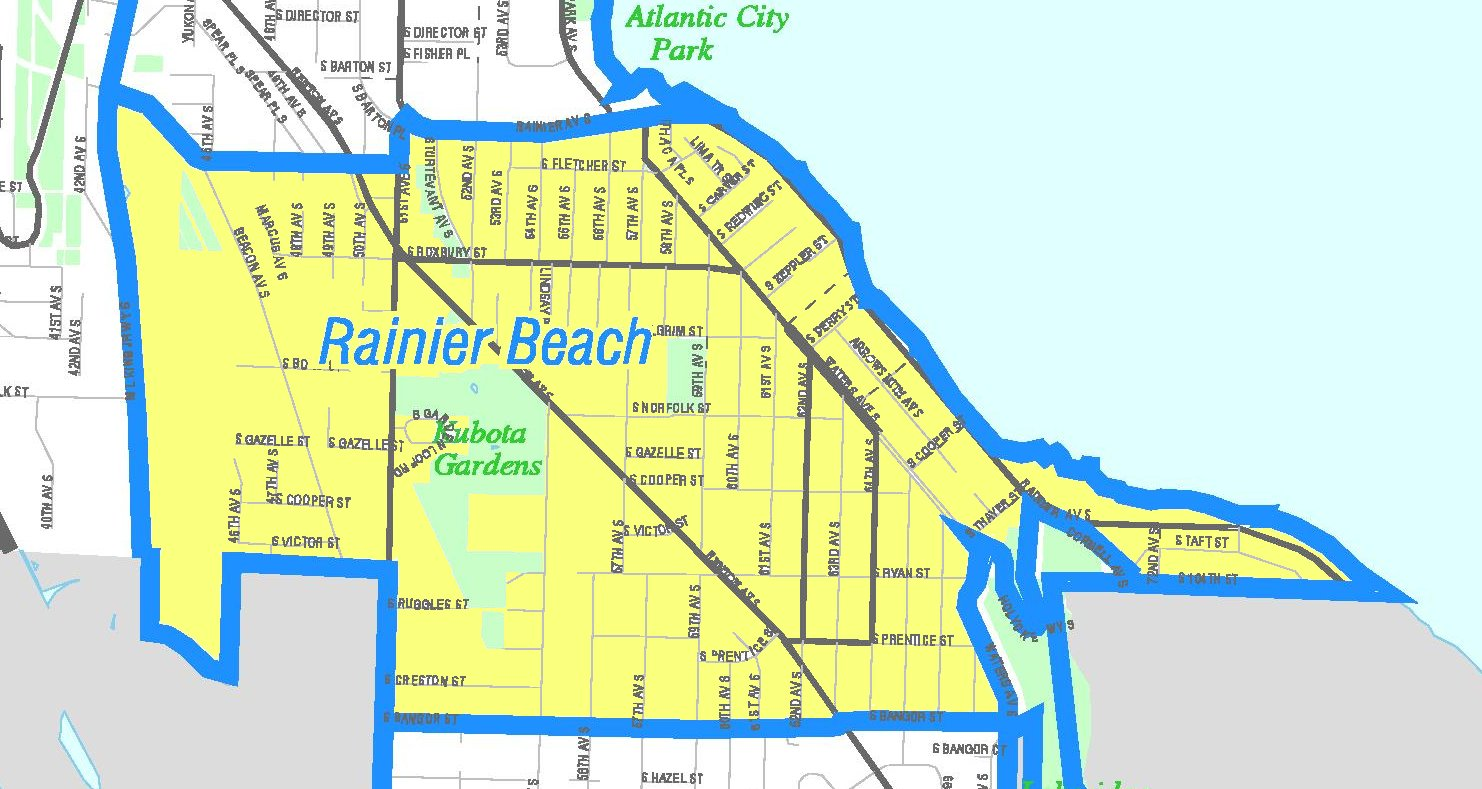
Rainier Beach Neighborhood

Rainier Beach (/reɪˈnɪər/ ray-NEER) is a set of neighborhoods in Seattle, Washington, that are mostly residential. Also called Atlantic City, Rainier Beach can include Dunlap, Pritchard Island, and Rainier View neighborhoods.

The neighborhood is located in the far southeastern corner of the city along Lake Washington. Its primary arterials are Rainier and Renton Avenues South (northwest- and southeast-bound).

Neighborhood boundaries are informal and sometimes overlapping in Seattle; formal designations have not existed since 1910. Rainier Beach blends with the Rainier Valley neighborhood of Dunlap (also called Othello) on the north. On the east is Lake Washington, and the South Beacon Hill neighborhood lies to the west. South of Rainier Beach is Rainier View, bounded by South Bangor Street on the north and the city boundary on its south, east, and west. The Lakeridge and Skyway neighborhoods of unincorporated King County lie to the southeast and southwest, respectively, of Rainier View. The city of Tukwila abuts Rainier View on the west.

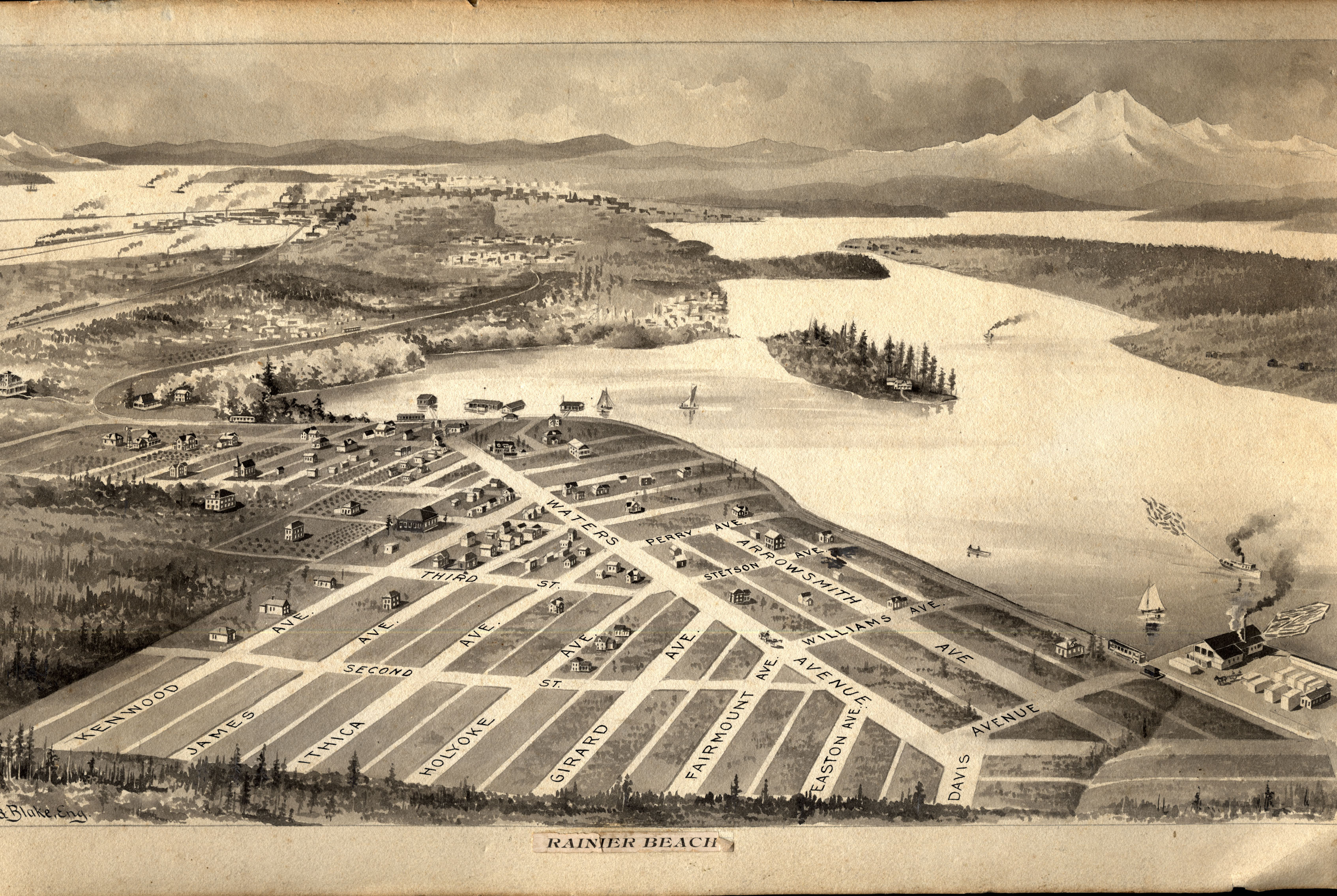
Bird's eye view of Rainier Beach, 1895. Courtesy of Seattle Municipal Archives.

== History ==
What is now Rainier Beach neighborhood has been inhabited since the end of the last glacial period (c. 8,000 BC – 10,000 years ago). The Xacuabš (hah-chu-ahbsh, 'Lake People' or 'People of the Large Lake') were related to, but distinct from, the Dkh^{w}'Duw'Absh ('People of the Inside') tribe of the Lushootseed (Skagit-Nisqually) Coast Salish Nations. Both are now (c. mid-1850s) of the Duwamish tribe. The Xacuabš village of tleelh-chus ('little island') was, appropriately, on an island at the southwest shore of what is now called Lake Washington, at their trail through a valley that led to the villages of the Dkh^{w}'Duw'Absh on salt water at Elliott Bay and the estuarial Duwamish River. The Duwamish were dispossessed with the Treaty of Point Elliott of 1855. The trail became the route for driving livestock to the town of Seattle (1870s), the valley was renamed Rainier Valley, the island tleelh-chus was renamed Young's Island (1883), then Pritchard Island (1900), the trail became the route of the Seattle and Rainier Beach Railway (1894), then the Seattle, Renton and Southern. The route became that of Rainier Avenue South (1937), the main road to Renton, and until 1940, to Snoqualmie Pass, until the innovative Lake Washington Floating Bridge opened at the nearby Mount Baker neighborhood.

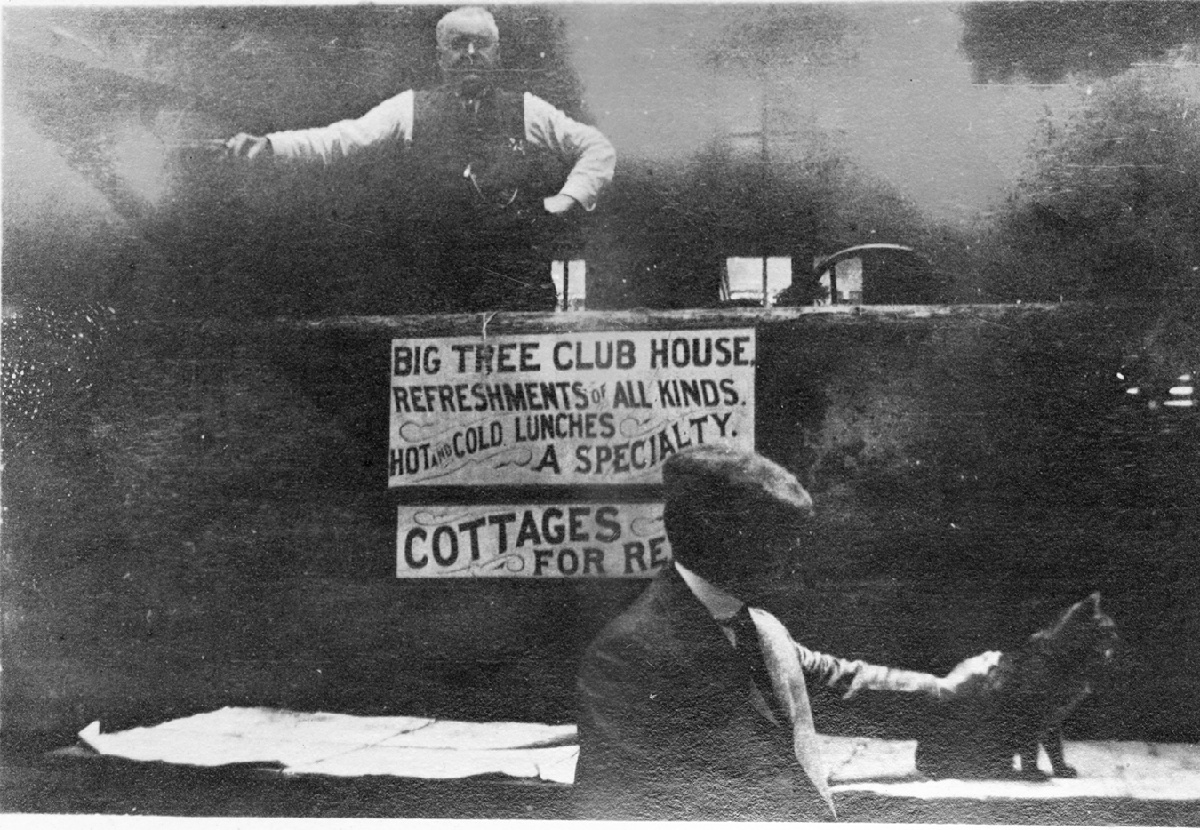
Early Rainier Beach business

An electric trolley line came to Rainier Valley in 1891, terminating in Columbia City, and extended to Renton in 1896. Residential development accelerated. Clarence Dayton Hillman, namesake of the nearby Hillman City neighborhood, designated Rainier Beach as the Atlantic City Addition (1905), after the New Jersey resort. He included a park area on the cove, built a pier, bath house, boat house, picnic facilities—and sold the land to multiple buyers when he got around to platting the properties snapped up by eager buyers attracted by the adjacent amenities, as well as allowing multiple street naming rights. The interurban railway remained until 1936, when it was torn up to make way for automobiles.

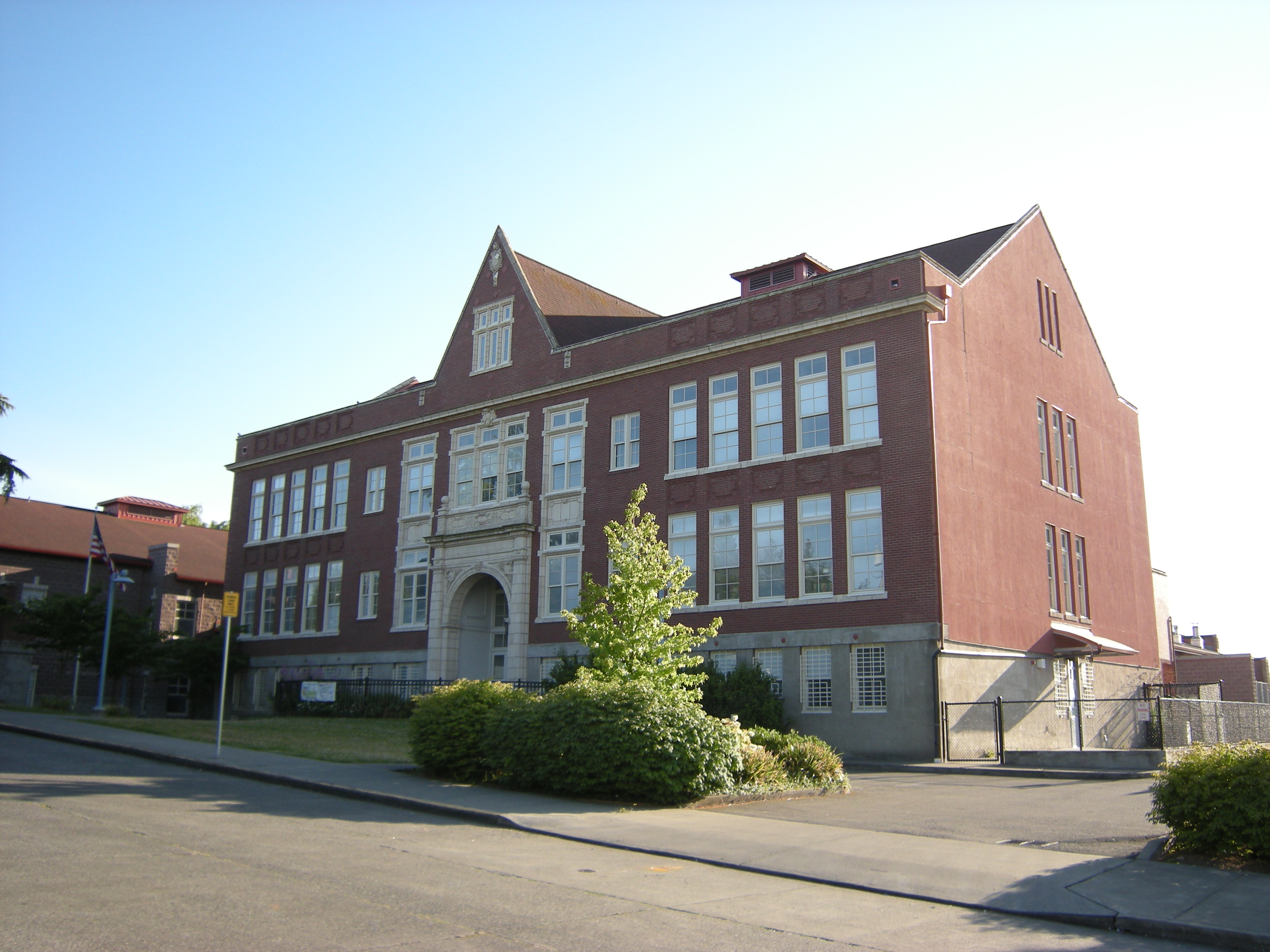
Emerson Elementary School

Of historic buildings, at least two survive. Emerson School (1909) sits on a hill over Rainier Beach. Emerson is nearly identical to Hawthorne and Greenwood schools, built at the same time. All are brick in Jacobean style. The first public Kindergarten in Seattle opened in 1914 at Emerson School. A notable Emerson graduate was professional baseball player and manager Fred Hutchinson (1919–1964), remembered today as the namesake of the Fred Hutchinson Cancer Research Center. Seattle Fire Department Firehouse #33 (1914), is a historic landmark, built for a single, horse-drawn fire engine. The modified Tudor style was fit with the surrounding neighborhood at the time. The hose tower was built into the ground rather than built above the roof line. For the horses (1914–1924), the floor of the single equipment bay was sloped to reduce the starting jolt in responding to a fire alarm.

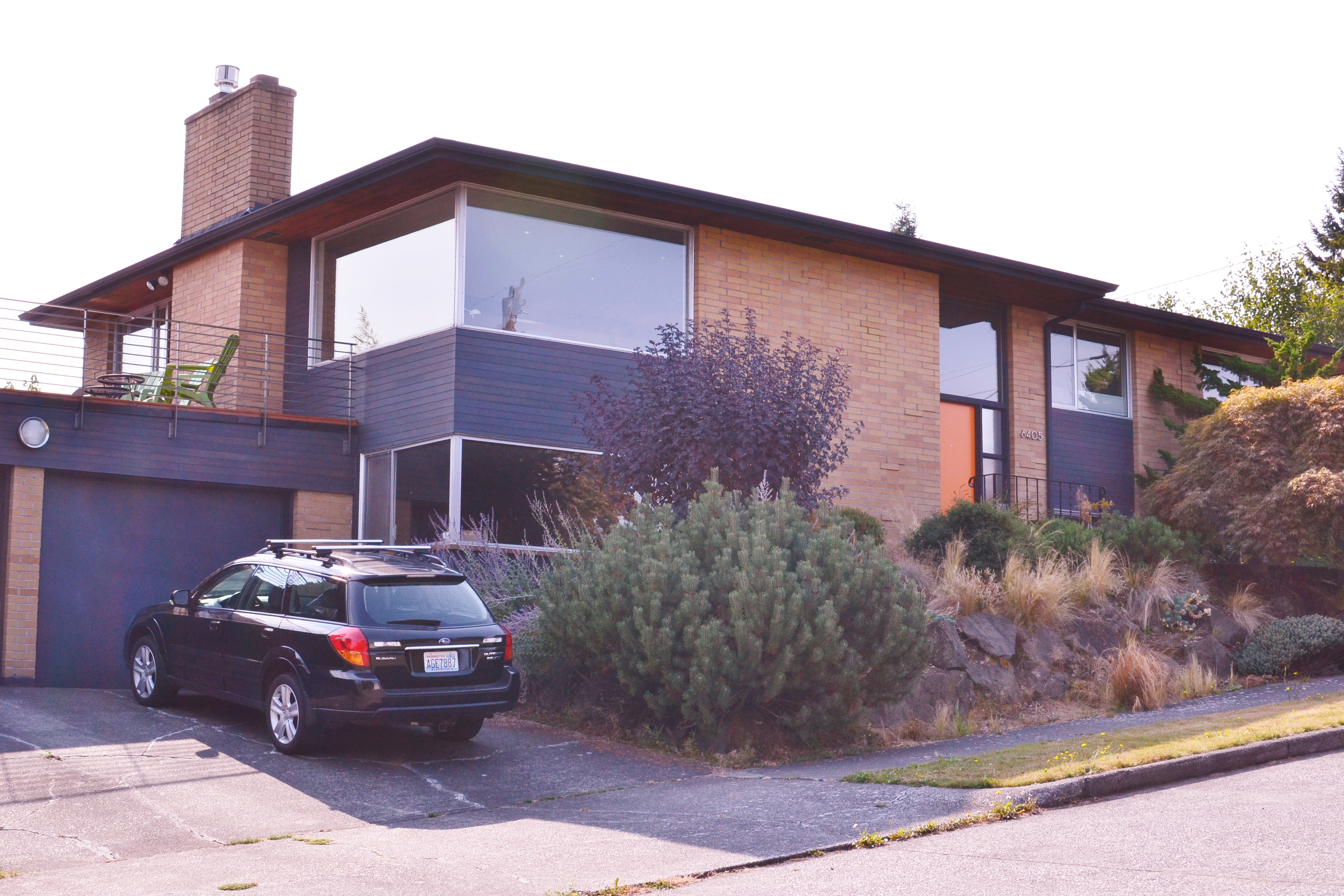
Rainier Beach mid-century home

Rainier Beach joined Seattle by annexation in 1907. In 1917, the level of the lake was dropped about 9 feet (2.7 m) with US Army Corps of Engineers construction of the Lake Washington Ship Canal. Pritchard Island became a peninsula and the sloughs (actually marshes) went dry. After World War II, the area became urban. With a sewer outfall near the beaches of Atlantic City Park and dramatic collapses in water quality in the 1950s, the neighborhood benefited greatly with the Metro cleanup of Lake Washington in the 1960s.

== Demographics ==
Today Rainier Beach has a population of 6,006 and is roughly 55% African American, 20% Asian, 10% Caucasian, 10% Hispanic and 5% from other races. The African-American population has been slowly increasing in the neighborhood due in large part to the gentrification in other Seattle neighborhoods that has forced many Black residents to move either to the South End or into the south King County suburbs. Rainier Beach is now one of only two neighborhoods in the city (the other being the southern end of the Central District) where Black residents make up a majority. On November 25, 2014, the neighborhood became the site of several protests following the decision in Ferguson, Missouri, not to indict police officer Darren Wilson over the killing of Michael Brown.

== Public places and spaces ==
Rainier Beach has Beer Sheva Park (Atlantic City Park 1934–1978) and the Atlantic City Boat Ramp, Kubota Garden Park, Lakeridge Park, Fred Hutchinson Playground, and Deadhorse Canyon Natural Area. Too steep for houses in the 19th century, Lakeridge Park preserves 35.8 acres (14.5 ha) of Taylor Creek and Deadhorse Canyon. Urban green spaces and restored natural places can not long survive the intense impact of urban life without due care and community stewardship. Neighborhood groups of citizen stewards and of Rainier Beach creeks, trails, and woods provide public education and volunteer effort, together with the City Department of Neighborhoods and the Parks and Recreation Department.

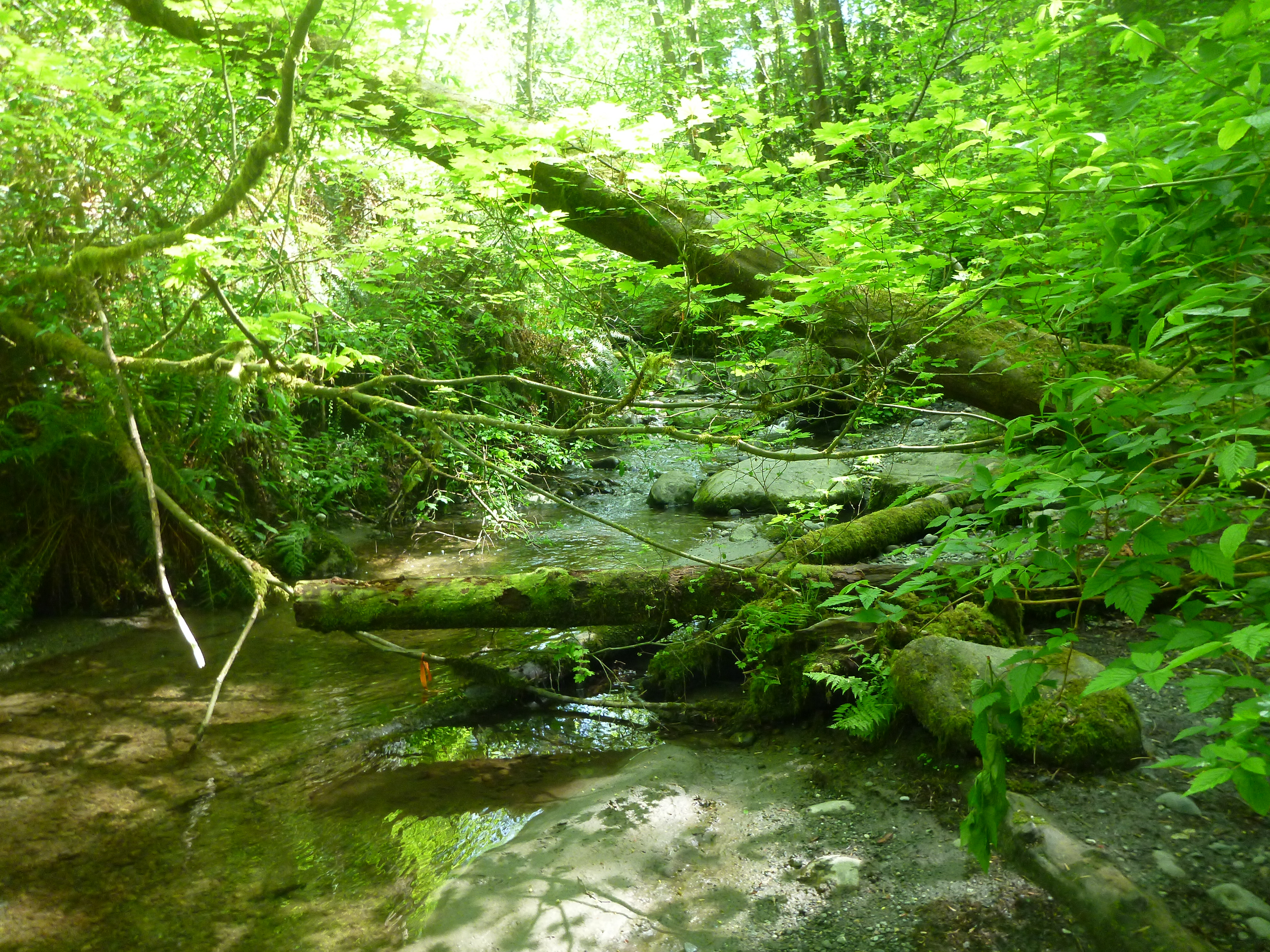
Taylor Creek

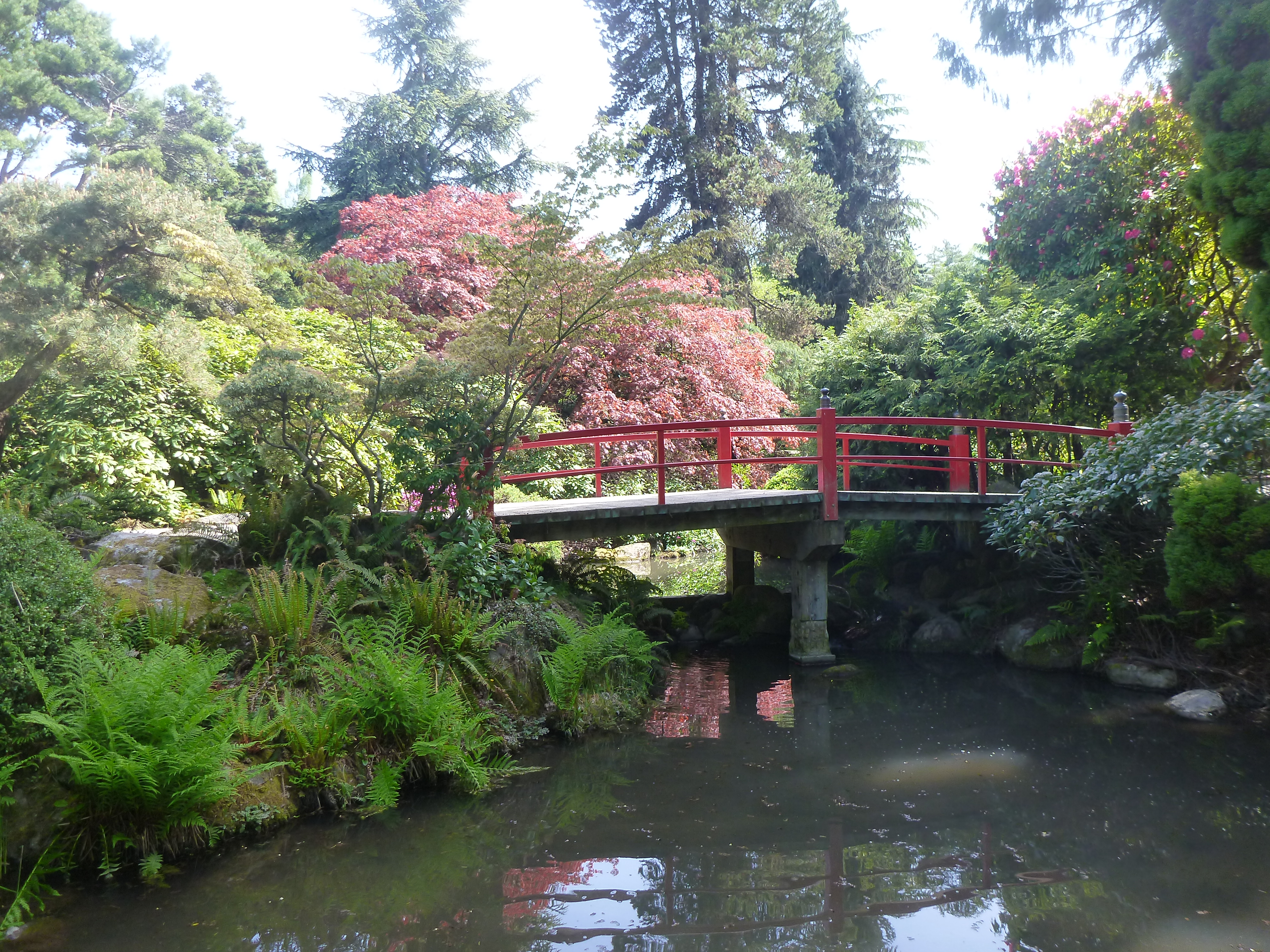
Bridge at Kubota Garden

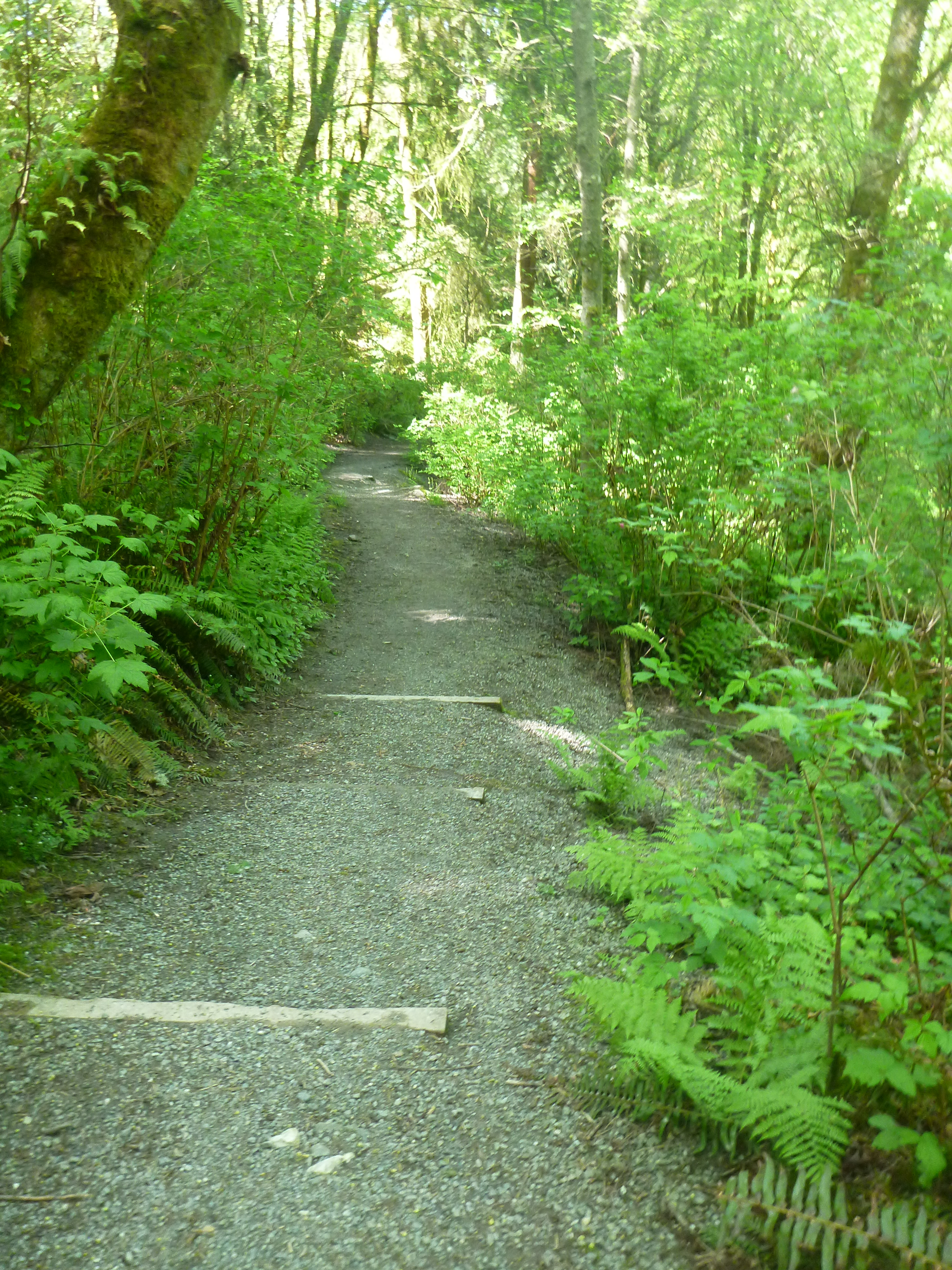
Path in Deadhorse Canyon

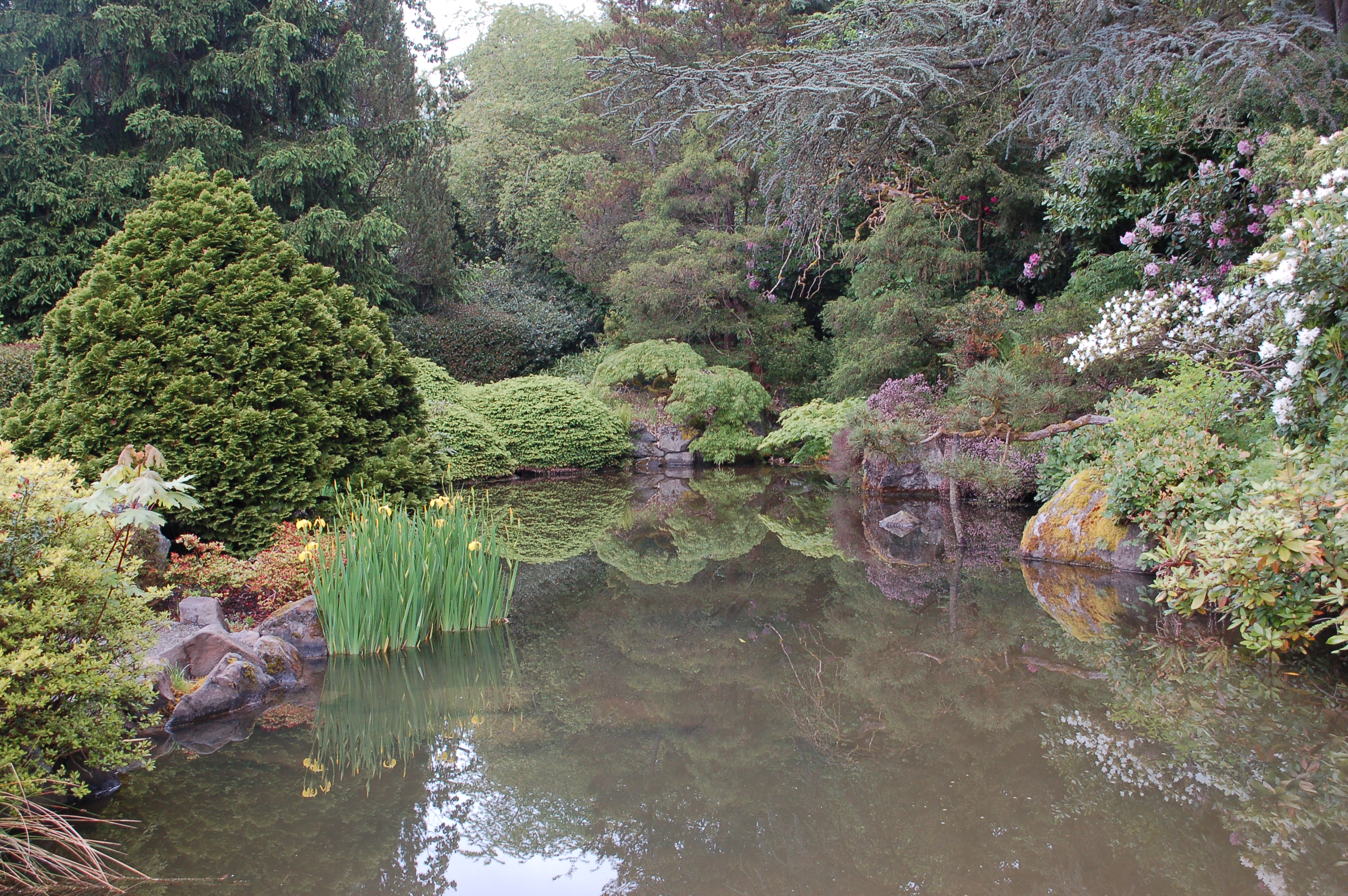
Mapes Creek as it runs through Kubota Garden

Mapes Creek flows from a ridge in Rainier Beach through Kubota Garden Historical Landmark (1981) and Beer Sheva Park (formerly Atlantic City Park 1907–1977) to Lake Washington. The creek was largely spared the assault of urban development by the relative remoteness of its watershed through the boom development decades 1850–1910 and the efforts of the business of Master Gardener Fujitaro Kubota from 1927, interrupted by World War II Japanese American Internment, until his death in 1973. Valiant efforts of the Kubota family had continued to leave it relatively protected until environmental protection blossomed in the later 20th century. The garden is now maintained by the gardeners of the city Parks and Recreation department and by volunteers, largely from surrounding neighborhoods. The city purchased approximately 17 acres (6.9 ha) of adjacent land to remain as a natural area, thus protecting about 21.5 acres (8.7 ha) of Mapes Creek and the headwaters ravine (1987). The non-profit Kubota Garden Foundation (1990) provides stewardship to enhance and perpetuate the garden within the spirit and vision of its founder, in turn promoting understanding of Japanese gardening and philosophy in a uniquely syncretic Pacific Northwest Japanese American aesthetic.

Taylor Creek flows from Deadhorse Canyon (west of Rainier Avenue S at 68th Avenue S and northwest of Skyway Park), through Lakeridge Park to Lake Washington. With volunteer effort and some city matching grants, restoration has been underway since 1971. Volunteers have planted thousands of indigenous trees and plants, removed tons of garbage, removed invasive plants, and had city help removing fish-blocking culverts and improving trails. Viable, daylighted streams can exist only in intimate connection with restoration and stewardship by the neighborhoods of their watersheds in a long run, since the good health of an urban stream could not long survive carelessness or neglect. With impervious surfaces having replaced most of the natural ground cover in urban environments, both the sheer volume and flow rate from unmoderated stormwater and the carrying of non-point pollution converge through urban creeks. Effective solutions include the entire urban watershed, far beyond the riparian channel itself. A deer has been spotted and sightings of raccoon, opossum and birds are common. By about 2050, the area will be looking like a young version of what it looked like before being disrupted. Taylor is one of the four largest streams in urban Seattle. In 2010, the city of Seattle began a project to improve fish passage on the creek.

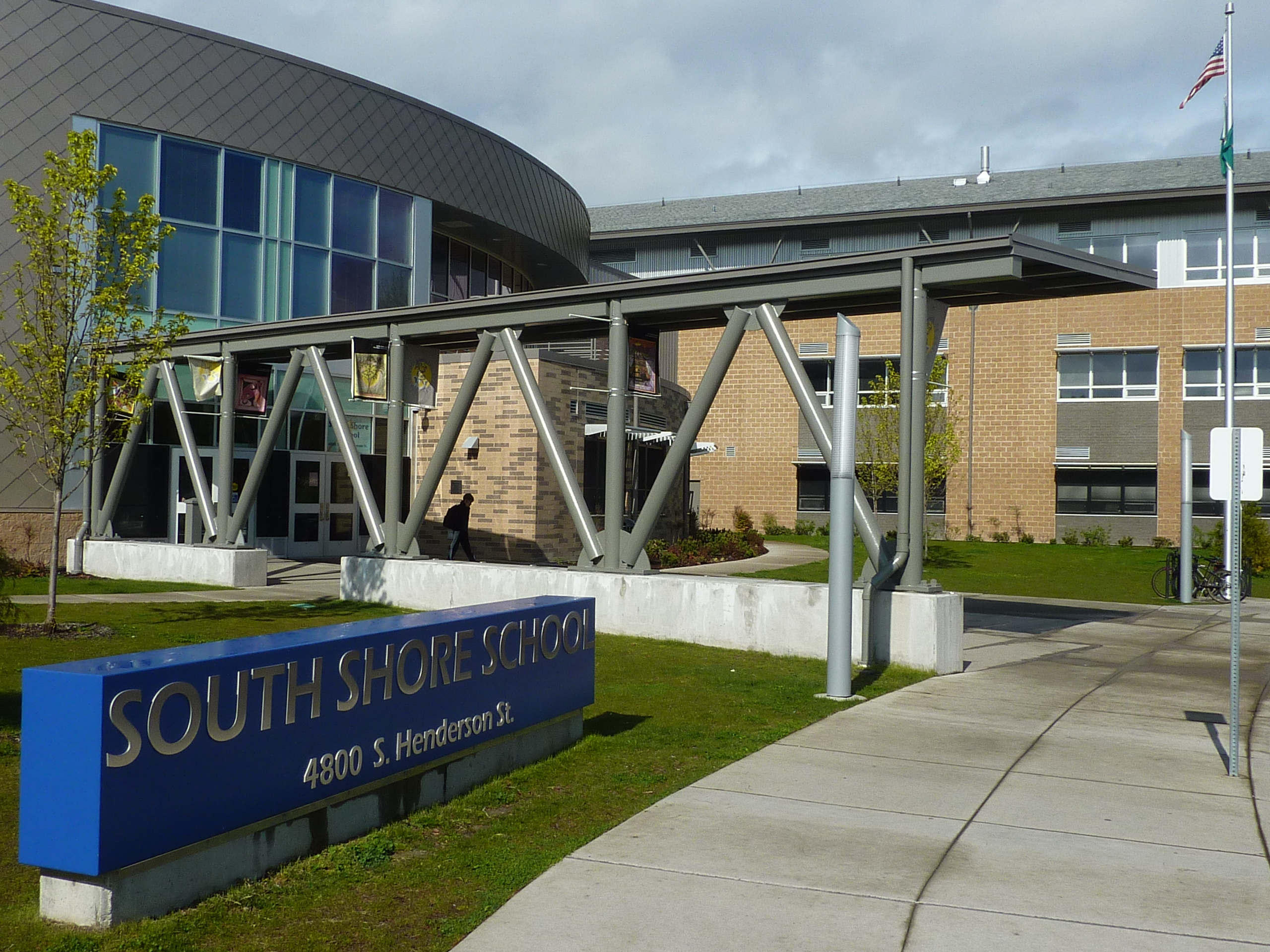
South Shore School

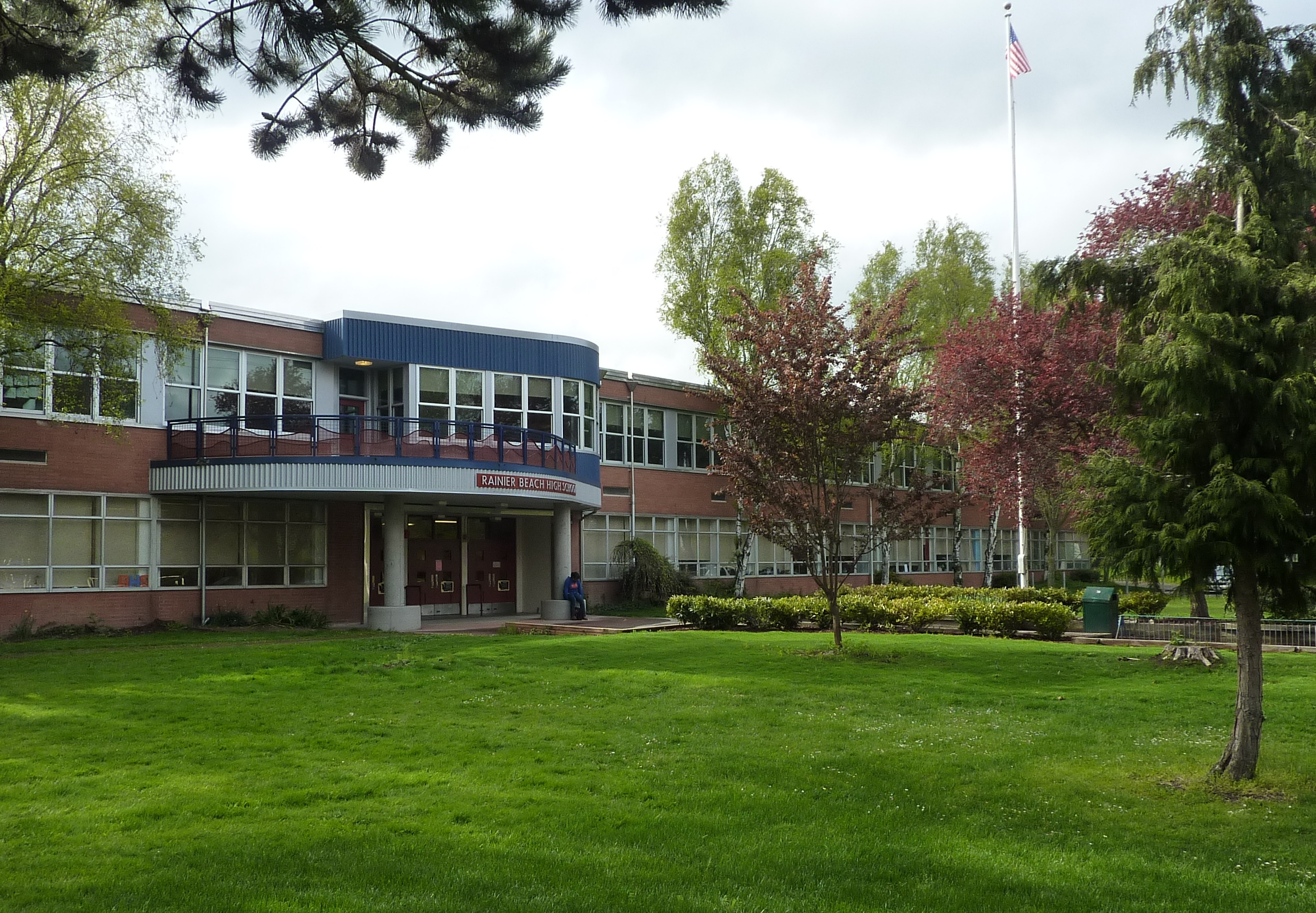
Rainier Beach High School

Schools located in the area include Rainier Beach High School and Rainier Valley Leadership Academy. Feeder schools include Rainier View and Emerson elementary schools, and South Shore K-8 school.

== Transit ==
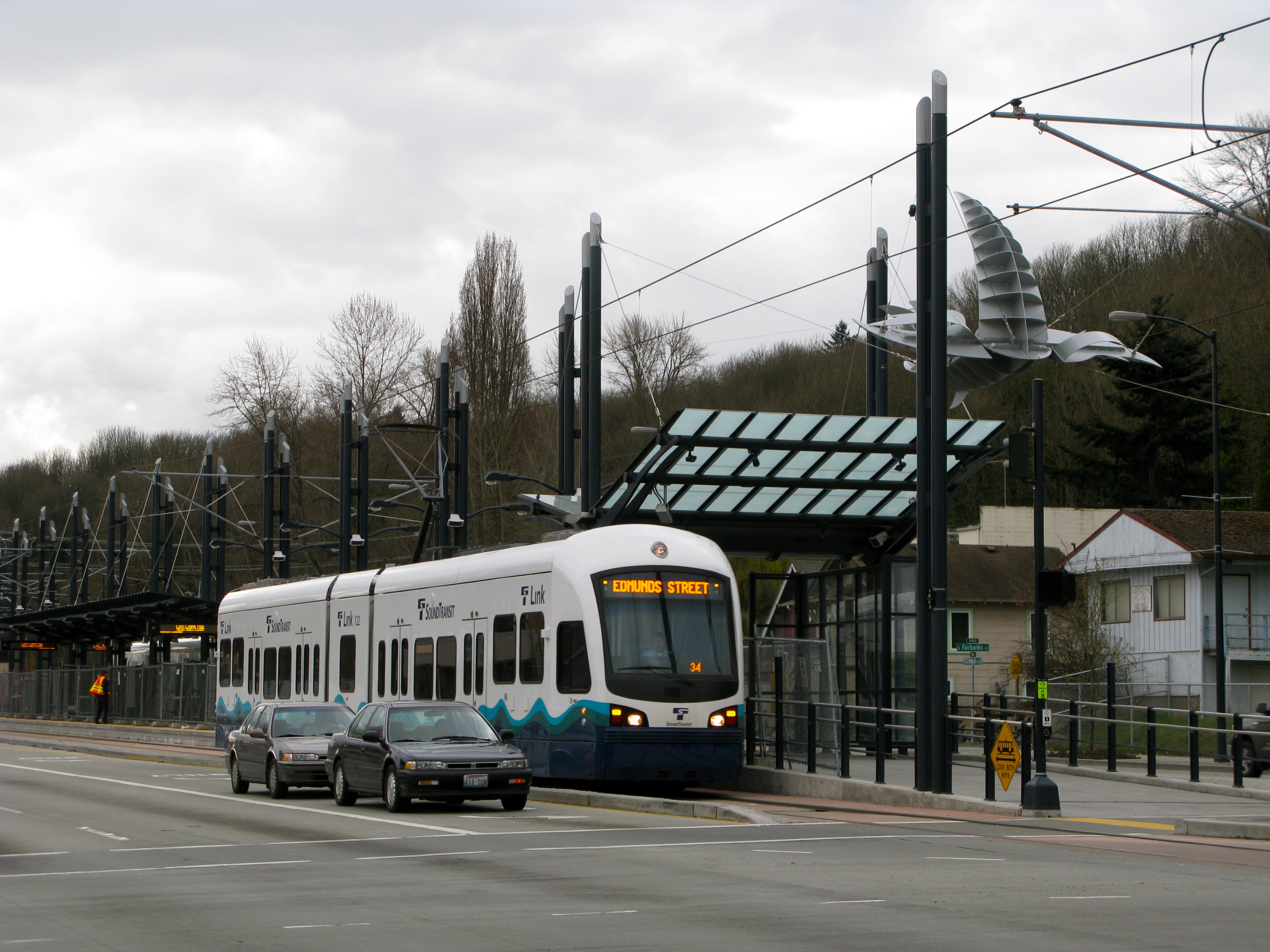
Rainier Beach Link Light Rail Station

Rainier Beach has a Sound Transit Link light rail station, the Rainier Beach station. To the north, this station connects Rainier Beach to Downtown Seattle, Capitol Hill, and the University of Washington. The Rainier Beach Station also provides service to the south, to the Seattle–Tacoma International Airport. King County Metro also serves the Rainier Beach area:

7	Downtown Seattle, International District, Rainier Valley, Columbia City, Rainier Beach
8	Rainier Beach, Central District, Capitol Hill, Seattle Center
9	Capitol Hill, Broadway, Seattle Central Community College, First Hill, Rainier Valley, Columbia City, Rainier Beach
106	Tunnel, Downtown Seattle, SODO, Rainier Beach, Skyway, Renton Transit Center
107	Rainier Beach, Rainier View, Lake Ridge, Bryn Mawr, Renton Transit Center

Nearby routes
36	Downtown Seattle, Pacific Medical Center, Beacon Hill, Jefferson Park, VA Hospital, Othello Station
50	Othello Station, Columbia City, Beacon Hill, SODO, West Seattle, Alki

== Bibliography ==
- "About the Seattle City Clerk's On-line Information Services". Information Services. Seattle City Clerk's Office. 2006-04-30.
  - See heading, "Note about limitations of these data".
- Dailey, Tom (n.d.). "Duwamish-Seattle". coastsalishmap.org. **Page links to Village Descriptions Duwamish-Seattle section.
  - Dailey referenced "Puget Sound Geography" by T. T. Waterman. Washington DC: National Anthropological Archives, mss. [n.d.] [ref. 2]; **Duwamish et al. vs. United States of America, F-275. Washington DC: US Court of Claims, 1927. [ref. 5];
  - "Indian Lake Washington" by David Buerge in the Seattle Weekly, 1–7 August 1984 [ref. 8];
  - "Seattle Before Seattle" by David Buerge in the Seattle Weekly, 17–23 December 1980. [ref. 9];
  - The Puyallup-Nisqually by Marian W. Smith. New York: Columbia University Press, 1940. [ref. 10]. **Recommended start is "Coast Salish Villages of Puget Sound"
- Dietrich, William (2000-04-16). "Stream Salvation". "Living: Our Northwest", Pacific Northwest magazine. The Seattle Times.
- Dorpat, Paul (1997). "ch. 59". Seattle, now & then, Vol. III. Seattle: Tartu Publications. ISBN 0-9614357-4-7. (hardcover), (softcover).
- "Dunlap". Seattle City Clerk's Neighborhood Map Atlas. Office of the Seattle City Clerk. 2002-06-13.
  - Rainier Beach and View maps NN-1330S and NN-1330S.Jpg [sic] dated 2002-06-13
- "The Kubota Garden Foundation Newsletter". Volume 16, Number 1. Spring–Summer 2006. Archived from the original on 2006-06-03.
- "Natural Drainage Systems Overview". About SPU > Drainage & Sewer System > Natural Drainage Systems. Seattle Public Utilities. 2003-12-03. Archived from the original on September 29, 2007.
- Phelps, Myra L. (1978). "13". Public works in Seattle. Seattle: Seattle Engineering Department. ISBN 0-9601928-1-6.
- "Rainier Beach". Seattle City Clerk's Neighborhood Map Atlas. Office of the Seattle City Clerk. 2002-06-13.
- "Rainier View". Seattle City Clerk's Neighborhood Map Atlas. Office of the Seattle City Clerk. 2002-06-13.
- Sherwood, Don (2003-06-20). "Atlantic City Park" (PDF). Park History: Sherwood History Files. Seattle Parks and Recreation Department.
- "A Short History of the Kubota Garden". Archived from the original on 2006-06-15.
- "Southeast". Seattle Neighborhoods. HistoryLink.org. Archived from the original on 2006-06-15.
- "Street Classification Maps". Seattle Department of Transportation. 2005. Archived from the original on 2006-06-14.
  - High-Resolution Version, PDF format, 16.1 MB
  - Medium-Resolution Version, PDF format, 1.45 MB 12 January 2004.
  - Low-Resolution Version, PDF format, 825 KB 12 January 2004.
  - "Planned Arterials Map Legend Definitions", PDF format. 12 January 2004.
  - The high resolution version is good for printing, 11 x 17. The low and medium resolution versions are good for quicker online viewing. [Source: "Street Classification Maps, Note on Accessing These PDF Files"]
- "Street Edge Alternatives (SEA Streets) Project Index". About SPU > Drainage & Sewer System > Natural Drainage Systems. Seattle Public Utilities. n.d. Archived from the original on 2006-05-12.
- Wilma, David (2001-04-06). "Seattle Landmarks: Emerson Elementary School (1909)". HistoryLink.org Essay 3170.
- Wilma, David (2001-04-06). "Seattle Landmarks: Firehouse No. 33 (1914)". HistoryLink.org Essay 3165.
  - [No sources cited; Department of Neighborhoods, Landmarks Preservation Board, Seattle Landmarks, Fire Station #33 links to this page.]
- Wilma, David (2001-03-18). "Seattle Neighborhoods: Brighton Beach -- Thumbnail History". HistoryLink.org Essay 3110.
  - Wilma referenced an extensive list. [This article used only interurban railway information.]
- Wilma, David (2001-03-21). "Seattle Neighborhoods: Rainier Beach -- Thumbnail History". HistoryLink.org Essay 3116.
  - Wilma referenced Don Sherwood, "Atlantic City Park", Interpretive Essays on the History of Seattle Parks, Handwritten bound manuscript dated 1977, Seattle Room, Seattle Public Library;
  - Don Sherwood, "Beer Sheva Park", Ibid.;
  - David Buerge, "The Native American Presence in the Rainier Valley Area", typescript, undated, Rainier Valley Historical Society, Seattle;
  - David Buerge, "Indian Lake Washington", The Weekly, August 1-August 7, 1984, pp. 29–33;
  - Lucille McDonald, "Old-Timers of Rainier Beach Area", The Seattle Sunday Times, January 1, 1956, Magazine, 8;
  - Lucile McDonald, "Early Developments In Southeast Seattle", Ibid., January 15, 1956, 8;
  - Mark Higgins, "Diverse Population Makes for a Unique Feel", Seattle Post-Intelligencer, June 7, 1997, (www.seattlep-i.nwsource.com);
  - Mark Higgins, "Off The Beaten Path, Rejuvenation Takes Shape", Ibid.;
  - Mark Higgins, "Residents Unhappy With Focus On Negative", Ibid.;
  - Walt Crowley, National Trust Guide: Seattle, (New York: Preservation Press, 1998), 218-221;
  - "Rainier Beach Library: Our History", Seattle Public Library Website, (www.spl.lib.wa.us);
  - Paul Dorpat, "Rainier Beach Station", Seattle Now and Then, Vol. III (Seattle: Tartu Publications, 1992).
- Wilma, David (2002-05-01). "Seattle voters reject a city manager and district elections on June 30, 1914". HistoryLink.org Essay 3761.
  - Wilma referenced Richard Berner, Seattle 1900-1920: From Boomtown, Urban Turbulence, to Restoration (Seattle: Charles Press), 191;
  - "Seattle Will Stand By Old City Charter", The Seattle Daily Times, July 1, 1914, p. 1, 2;
  - "Charter Attacked By Dr. Matthews", Seattle Post-Intelligencer, June 22, 1914, p. 2.
