= Bloedel Reserve =

Forest garden on Bainbridge Island, Washington

Coordinates: 47°42′30″N 122°32′52″W

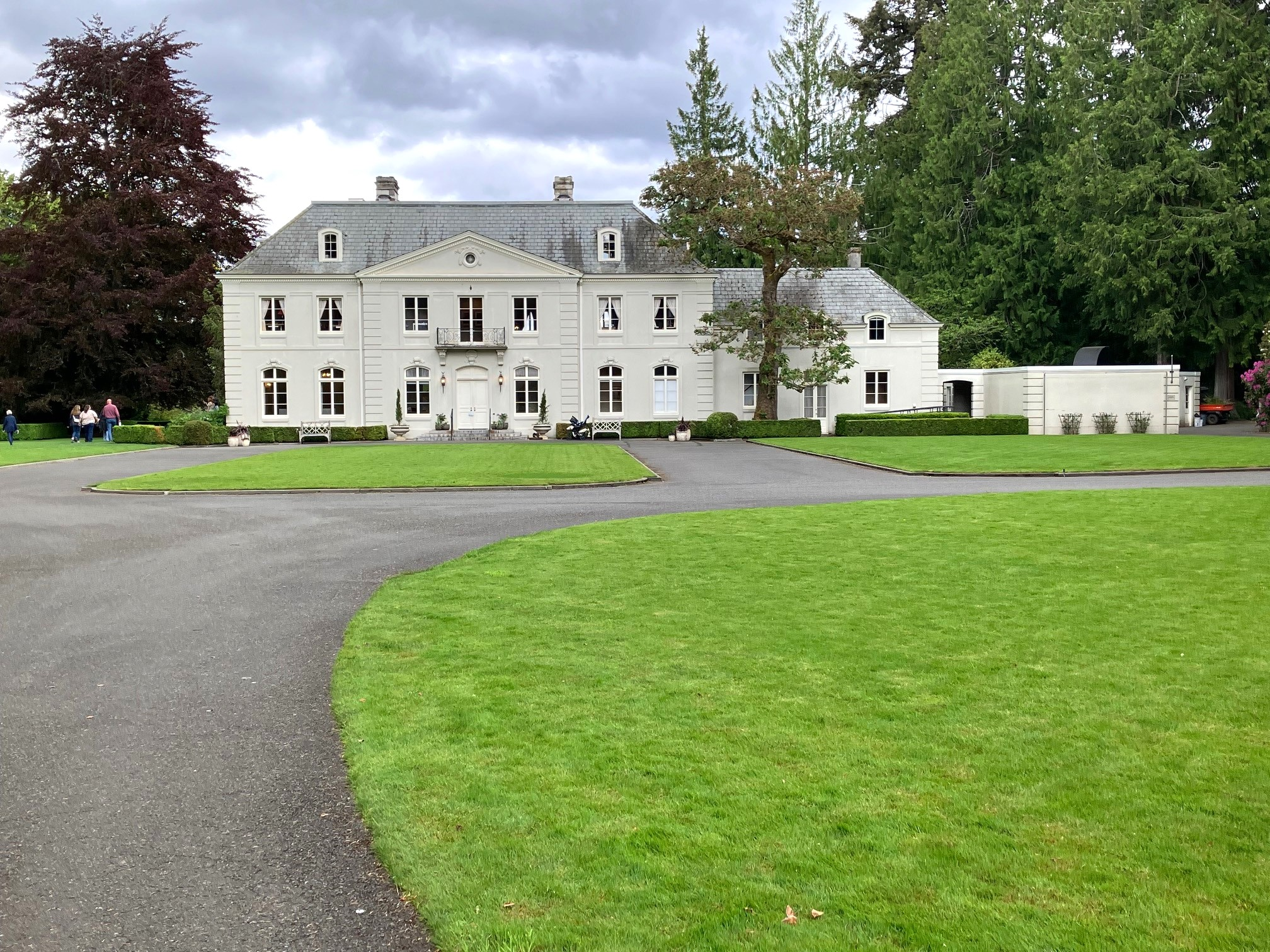
- Manor House
- Interactive map of Bloedel Reserve
- Location: Bainbridge Island, Washington
- Area: 140 acres (57 ha)

The Bloedel Reserve is a 140-acre (57 ha) forest garden on Bainbridge Island, Washington. It was created by Virginia and Prentice Bloedel, the vice-chairman of the lumber company MacMillan Bloedel Limited, under the influence of the conservation movement and Asian philosophy. The couple wished to capture the essence of the Japanese garden—the qualities of naturalness, subtlety, reverence, tranquility—and construct a Western expression of it.

== Features ==
Although the Reserve includes a traditional Japanese garden, the Bloedels' approach for the rest of the property stands in contrast to that of 'Japanese gardens' which achieve their effects through the use of ornament. The Bloedel Reserve has both natural and highly landscaped lakes, immaculate lawns, woods, a stone garden, a moss garden, a rhododendron glen, and a reflection garden. The lead landscape architect on the project was Cornelia Oberlander. She was assisted by landscape architects Richard Haag, Thomas Church and Danielle Stern.

The Bloedels' French Chateau-style home, including many original furnishings, is preserved as a visitor center.

The Reserve opened to the public in 1988 as a family run foundation and registered as a 501(c)3 public charity in 2010. It is open year-round.

== Gallery ==
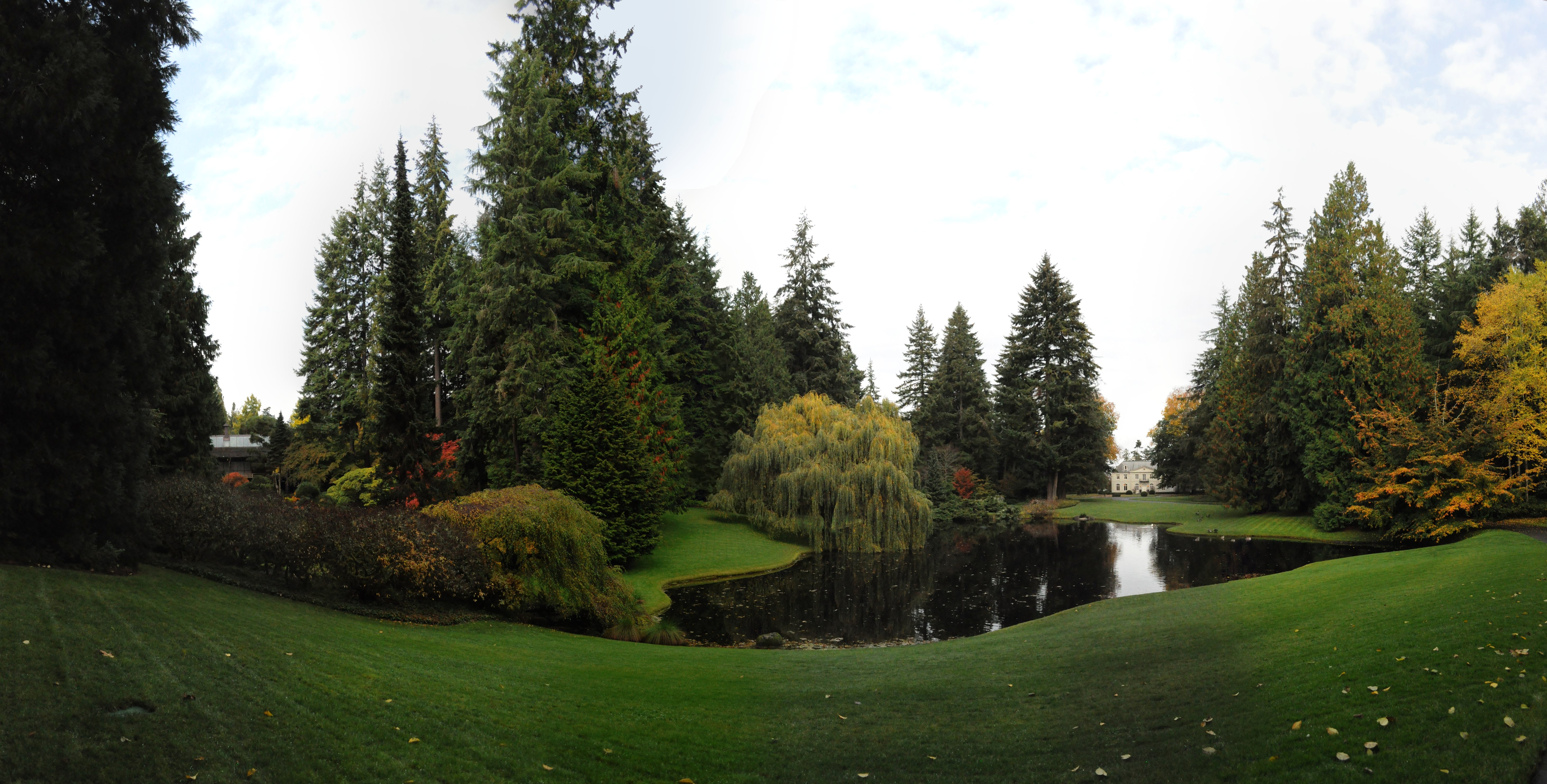
Panoramic view of a section of the reserve

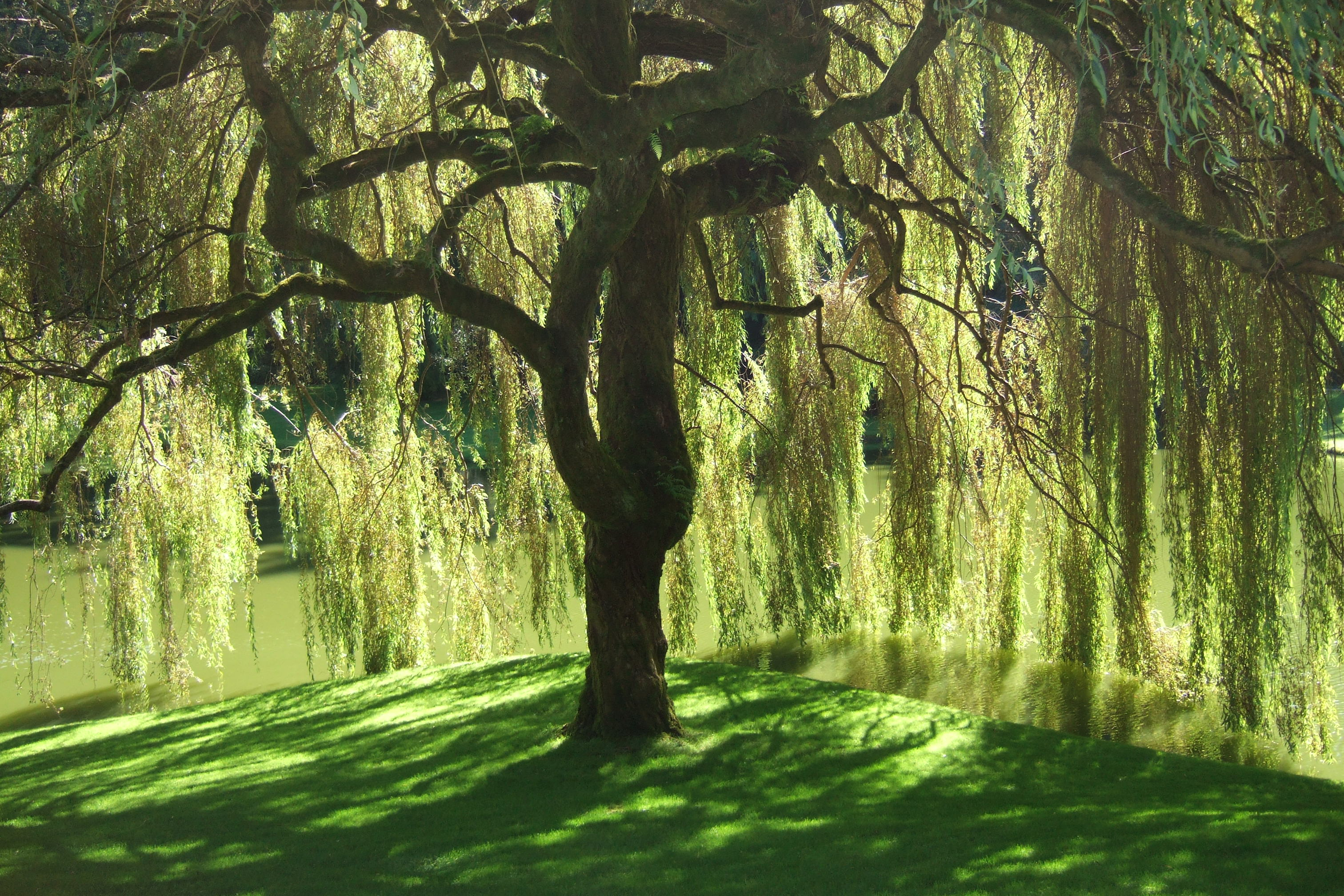
A willow tree at the reserve

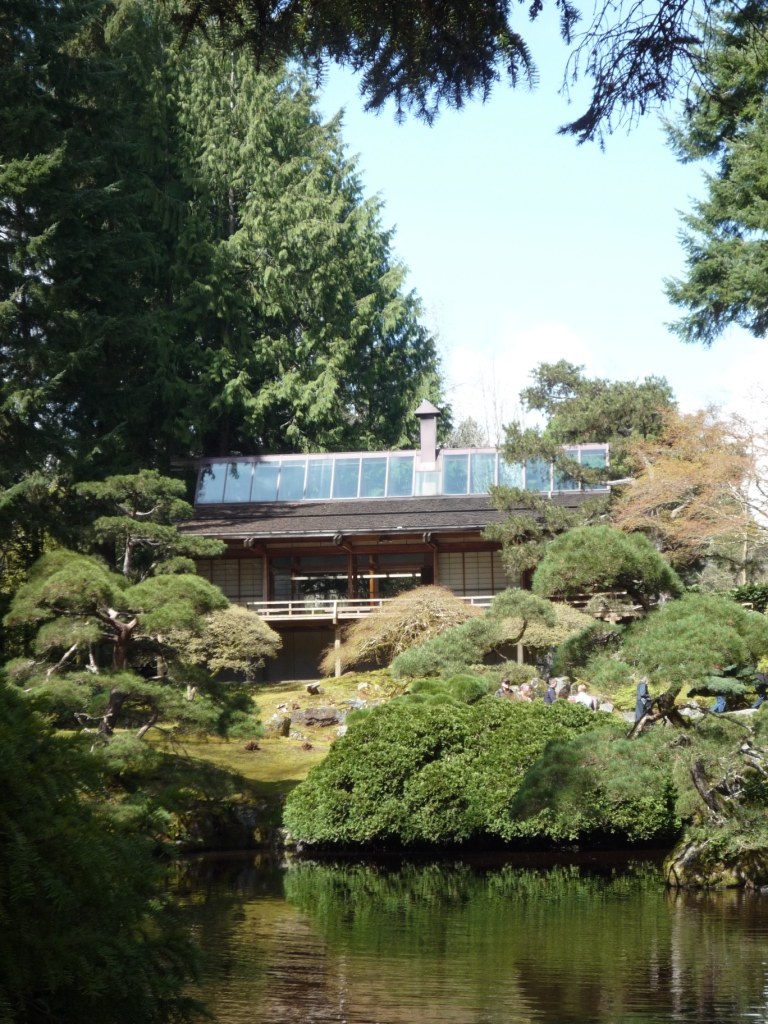
The Japanese Garden at the reserve

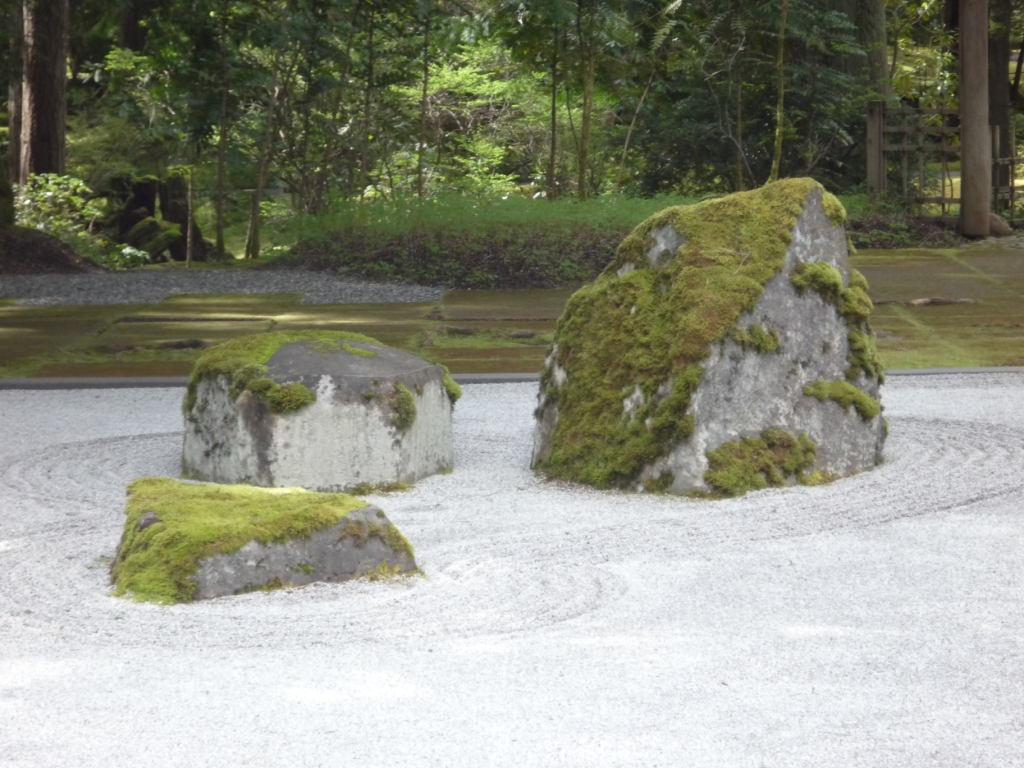
Closeup of a trio of rocks in the Stone Garden

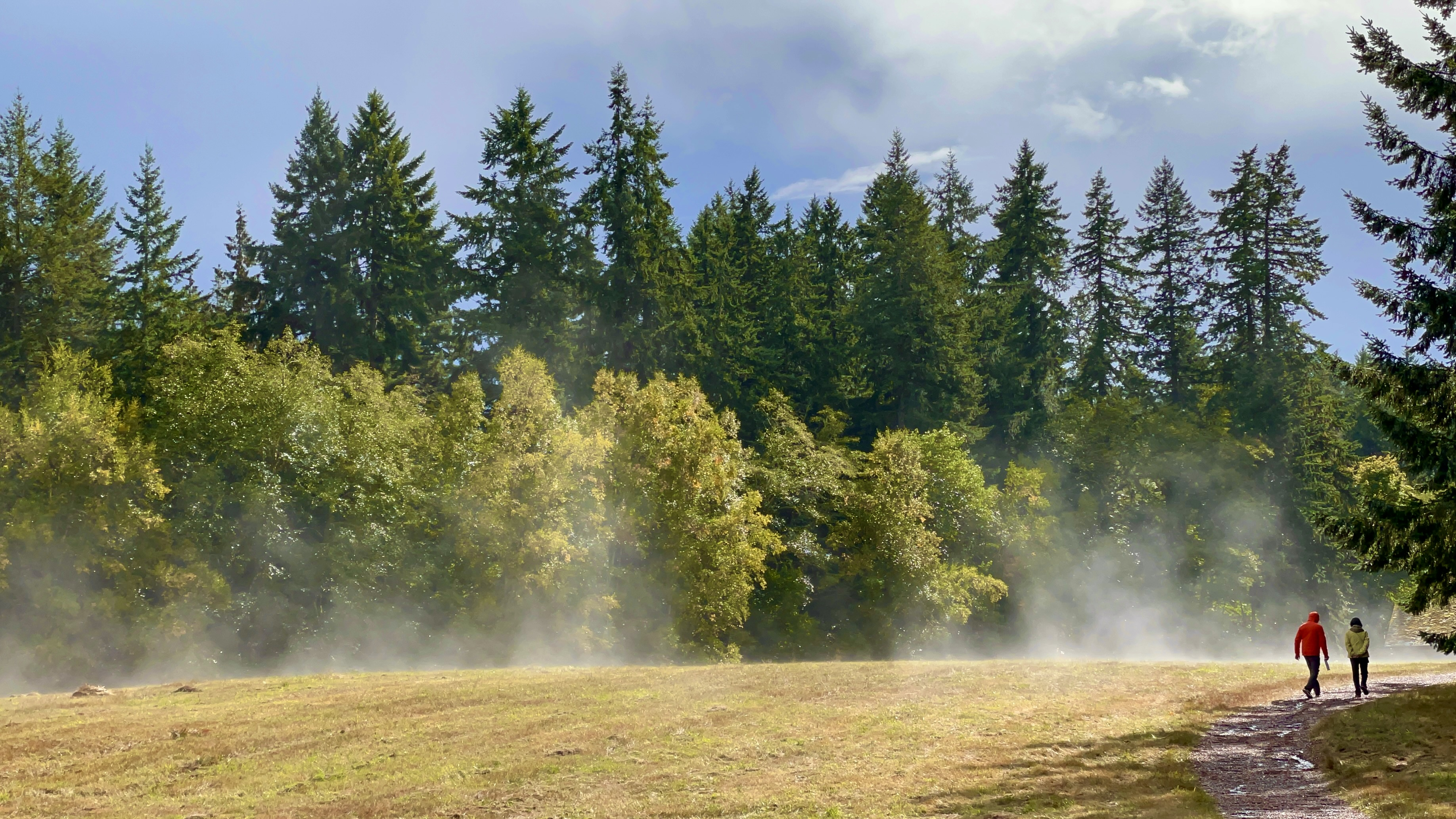
A walking path in the reserve.

== See also ==
- List of botanical gardens in the United States
