= Caeau =

Caeau means fields in Welsh and may refer to the following Sites of Special Scientific Interest in Wales:

- Caeau Ardwyn
- Caeau Blaen-bydernyn
- Caeau Blaen-yr-Orfa
- Caeau Blaenau-mawr
- Caeau Capel Hendre
- Caeau Cnwch a Ty'n-y-graig
- Caeau Fferm
- Caeau Ffos Fach
- Caeau Bronydd-mawr
- Caeau Cefn Cribwr
- Caeau Crug Bychan, Ty Gwyn a Llwyn Ysgaw
- Caeau Cwmcoynant (Caeau Cwncaenant)
- Caeau Llety-cybi
- Caeau Llwyn Gwrgan
- Caeau Lotwen
- Caeau Nant Garenig
- Caeau Nant y Llechau
- Caeau Nantsais
- Caeau Pant-y-Bryn
- Caeau Pen-y-coed
- Caeau Rhyd-y-gwiail
- Caeau Tir-mawr
- Caeau Ty-mawr
- Caeau Ty'n-llwyni
- Caeau Ton-y-fildre
