= Mawr (disambiguation) =

Mawr is a community in south Wales.

Mawr means big or great in Welsh and may also refer to the following Wales-related topics:

== Villages, hamlets, communities, etc. ==
- Capel Mawr, Llangristiolus
- Cefn Mawr
- Cynnull-mawr
- Merthyr Mawr

== Lakes or polders ==
- Marchlyn Mawr
- Traeth Mawr

== Mountains, summits, hills, geologic formations ==
- Aber Mawr Shale
- Bera Mawr
- Bwlch Mawr
- Castell Mawr Rock
- Crug Mawr
  - Battle of Crug Mawr
- Manod Mawr
  - Manod Mawr North Top
- Moelwyn Mawr
- Pegwn Mawr
- Pen Allt-mawr
- Pen Twyn Mawr

== Nature reserves and Sites of Special Scientific Interest ==
- Caeau Blaenau-mawr
- Caeau Bronydd-mawr
- Caeau Tir-mawr
- Caeau Ty-mawr
- Clegir Mawr
- Coed Mawr – Blaen-Car
- Crest Mawr Wood
- Cwm Caner Mawr
- Cytir Mawr
- Merthyr Mawr Sand Dunes
- Ogof Ffynnon Ddu-Pant Mawr
- Pysgodlyn Mawr, a Site of Special Scientific Interest in Vale of Glamorgan

== Varia ==
- Mawr (surname)
- Bryn Mawr (disambiguation)
- Mynydd Mawr (disambiguation)
- Tŷ Mawr (disambiguation)
