= List of heronries in the United Kingdom =

This is a list of heronries in the United Kingdom.

- Allt y Gaer SSSI, Carmarthenshire, Wales
- Brownsea Island, Dorset, England
- Cleeve Heronry, Somerset, England
- Gailey Reservoirs, South Staffordshire, England
- Hilgay Heronry, Norfolk, England
- Waltham Abbey SSSI, Essex, England
- Ynys-hir RSPB reserve, Ceredigion, Wales
