= List of Sites of Special Scientific Interest in Carmarthenshire =

Map of Carmarthenshire within Wales

This is a list of Sites of Special Scientific Interest (SSSIs) in the Carmarthenshire Area of Search (AoS).

== History ==
This Area of Search was formed from the entirety of the previous AoS of Carmarthen & Dinefwr, as well as having a few sites from the previous AoSs of West Glamorgan, Preseli & South Pembrokeshire and Brecknock.

== Sites ==
- Taf Estuary (Aber Taf)
- Afon Cleddau Dwyreiniol - Eastern Cleddau River
- Afon Teifi
- Afon Tywi
- Allt Penycoed Stream Section
- Allt y Gaer
- Allt y wern
- Angle Peninsula Coast
- Marros-Pendine Coast (Arfordir Marros-Pentywyn)
- Pembrey Coast (Arfordir Pen-Bre)
- Saundersfoot to Telpyn Coast (Arfordir Saundersfoot - Telpyn)
- Beacon Bog
- Birdshill Quarry
- Bishops Pond
- Broad Oak and Thornhill Meadows
- Burry Inlet and Loughor Estuary
- Cae Blaen-dyffryn
- Cae Cilmaenllwyd
- Cae Cwm-tywyll
- Cae Gwynfryn
- Cae Maes-y-ffynnon
- Caeau Afon Gwili
- Caeau Blaenau-mawr
- Caeau Blaen-bydernyn
- Caeau Blaen-yr-Orfa
- Caeau Capel Hendre
- Caeau Caradog
- Caeau Ffos Fach
- Caeau Heol y Llidiart-coch
- Caeau Lotwen
- Caeau Nant Garenig
- Caeau Nantsais
- Caeau Pant-y-Bryn
- Caeau Rhyd-y-gwiail
- Caeau Tir-mawr
- Carreg Cennan
- Cefn Blaenau
- Cernydd Carmel
- Talar Wen Quarry (Chwarel Talar Wen)
- Coed Cochion Quarry
- Coed Gwempa
- Coed Llandyfan
- Coedydd Capel Dyddgen
- Tregyb Woodlands (Coedydd Tregyb)
- Coedydd y Garn
- Cors Farlais
- Cors Goch, Llanllwch
- Corsydd a Rwyth Cilyblaidd
- Craig Ddu – Wharley Point Cliffs
- Llanstephan Cliffs (Creigiau Llansteffan)
- Crûg Farm Quarry
- Crychan Forest Tracks
- Cwar Glas Quarry and Sawdde Gorge
- Cwm Clydach
- Cwm Crymlyn Road Section
- Cwm Doethie - Mynydd Mallaen
- Cwm Twrch
- Cwm yr Abbey Stream Section
- Dan-Lan-Y-Castell Quarry
- Derwen-fach Meadow
- Dinefwr Estate
- Dolaucothi Gold Mines
- Felin Fach Meadows, Cwmgwili
- Ffair Fach Railway Cutting and River Section
- Glan Pibwr Stream Section
- Gwernydd Penbre
- Pen-Ty Pastures & Wood (Gweunydd a Choed Pen Ty)
- Gweunydd Glan-y-glasnant
- Llanfallteg Track Section
- Llety – Wen
- Llyn Llech Owain
- Llyn Pencarreg
- Talley Lakes (Llynoedd Tal-y-llechau)
- Maesyprior
- Mandinam a Coed Deri
- Meidrim Road Section
- Mylett Road Section
- Mynydd Du
- Mynydd Llangyndeyrn
- Mynydd Ystyfflau-Carn
- Pen-y-graig-goch
- Pine Lodge Meadow
- Pont y Fenni Quarry and Road Cutting
- Pwll Lagoon
- Machynys Ponds (Pyllau Machynys)
- Rhos Cruglas
- Rhos Dolau-Bran
- Rhos Pwllygawnen
- Rhosydd Castell-du & Plas-y-bettws
- Laugharne-Pendine Burrows (Twyni Lacharn-Pentywyn)
- Rhosydd Llanpumsaint
- Smarts Quarry
- Waun-Ddu
- Waunfawr
- Wernbongam Stream Section and Quarry
- Whitehill Down
- Ydw Valley and Fron Road Geological Exposures
- Ynys Uchaf

== See also ==
- List of SSSIs by Area of Search
