= Afon Marlais =

Afon Marlais may refer to:

- Afon Marlais, Carmarthenshire
- Afon Marlais, Pembrokeshire

== See also ==
- Afon Marlas
