= Caeau Pant-y-Bryn =

Protected area in Carmarthenshire, Wales

- Site of Special Scientific Interest
- Location within Carmarthenshire
- Location of Caeau Pant-y-Bryn.
- Area of search: Carmarthenshire
- Grid reference: SN 657146
- Coordinates: 51.81363°N 3.94788°W
- Area: 8.2 hectares (0.08200 km^{2}; 0.03166 sq mi)
- Notification date: 1990

Caeau Pant-y-Bryn is a Site of Special Scientific Interest (SSSI) in Carmarthenshire, Wales.

== SSSI ==
Caeau Pant-y-Bryn SSSI is located approximately 1 mile (1.6 km) north-west of Glanaman, and covers 8.2 hectares (20 acres). Its north-east boundary abuts the Mountain Road from Glanaman to Coed Llandyfan.

The site is a set of five unimproved fields grazed by ponies, of a type once typical in the area, but now rare. The fields sit on Namurian sandstone and quartzite covered in Pleistocene boulder clay. The SSSI citation for Caeau Pant-y-Bryn specifies that the main feature is "a large stand of purple moor-grass (Molinia caerulea) and meadow thistle (Cirsium dissectum) Fen-meadow". A number of sedges and other plants are notable at the site, including:

- carnation sedge (Carex panicea)
- tawny sedge (Carex hostiana)
- flea sedge (Carex pulicaris)
- compact rush (Juncus conglomeratus)
- sharp-flowered rush (Juncus acutiflorus)
- meadow thistle (Cirsium dissectum)
- whorled caraway
- devil's-bit scabious (Succisa pratensis)
- tormentil (Potentilla erecta)

== See also ==
- List of Sites of Special Scientific Interest in Carmarthenshire
