= Allt y Gaer =

Protected area in Carmarthenshire, Wales

- Site of Special Scientific Interest
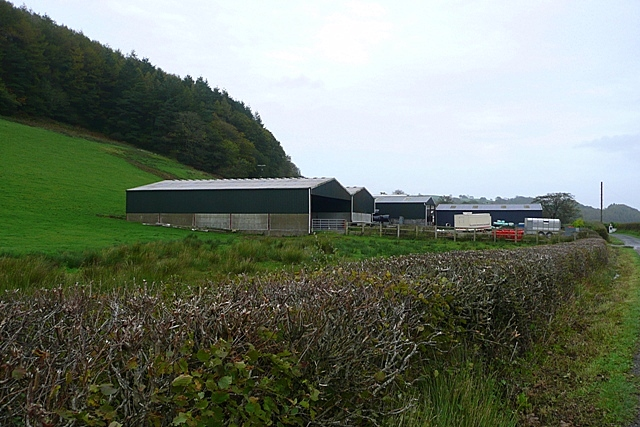
- Allt y Gaer woodland above the farm of the same name

- Location within Carmarthenshire
- Location of Allt y Gaer.
- Area of search: Carmarthen & Dinefwr
- Grid reference: SN 572 211
- Coordinates: 51.870143°N 4.07556°W
- Interest: Biological
- Area: 3.5 hectares (8.6 acres)
- Notification date: 1980

Allt y Gaer (Welsh for 'hill of the fort') is a Site of Special Scientific Interest (SSSI) in Llangathen community, Carmarthenshire, Wales. It is a 3.5ha conifer woodland on the northern slopes of the Tywi Valley, which has SSSI protected designation because it holds the largest heronry in West Wales.

== Heronry ==
The Heron population of the woods gradually expanded such that by 1980 there were routinely more than 40 pairs, representing some 7-10% of the heron population of West Wales. Before the growth in population at Allt y Gaer, there had been a large heronry a little way upstream at Allt y wern, and in the 19th century they are thought to have used an area of Dinefwr Park National Nature Reserve still known as 'The Heronry'. Why Herons abandon one site and move to another remains unknown, but may be connected to disturbance during tree-felling operations. The SSSI designation aims to encourage as little disturbance as possible, especially during the February–June breeding season, whilst maintaining an abundance of nesting sites and food supplies.

== Conifer woods ==
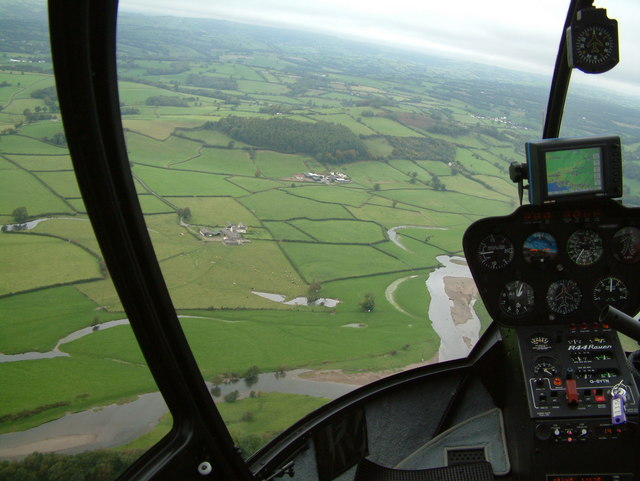
Towy Valley Farmland. Allt y gaer woods are in the upper centre

The woodland is a monocultural stand of mature conifers - especially larch. Although the dense shade and extensive litter layer of needles and branches have completely suppressed the pre-plantation flora, the mature stand of trees has allowed a significant growth of various species of fungi; in particular the wood provides a habitat for Spotted Toughshank (Rhodocollybia maculata), Plums and Custard (Tricholomopsis rutilans) and Clouded Agaric (Clitocybe nebularis).

== Hill of the fortress ==
Higher up the slopes, 350 metres (1,150 ft) to the north, is an Iron Age hillfort called Grongaer which gives the name to the hillside, the woodland, and a nearby farm.

== See also ==
- List of Sites of Special Scientific Interest in Carmarthenshire
