= Cefn Blaenau =

Protected area in Carmarthenshire, Wales

Coordinates: 52.052°N 4.069°W

Cefn Blaenau is a 23-hectare Site of Special Scientific Interest in a small upland valley in Carmarthen and Dinefwr, Wales. It was designated an SSSI in 1989, primarily for its flush and spring vegetation as well as the diverse mosaic of unimproved pasture, ‘ffridd’ land (steeply sloping land between enclosed fields and open hills, often dominated by bracken or gorse), marshy grassland, wet heath, acid grassland, broadleaved woodland, streams, and small rock outcrops. These habitats, which are well represented at this site, have been greatly reduced in north Carmarthenshire due to land improvement, agricultural intensification, and afforestation. Only about 140 hectares of flush and spring vegetation remain in the county.

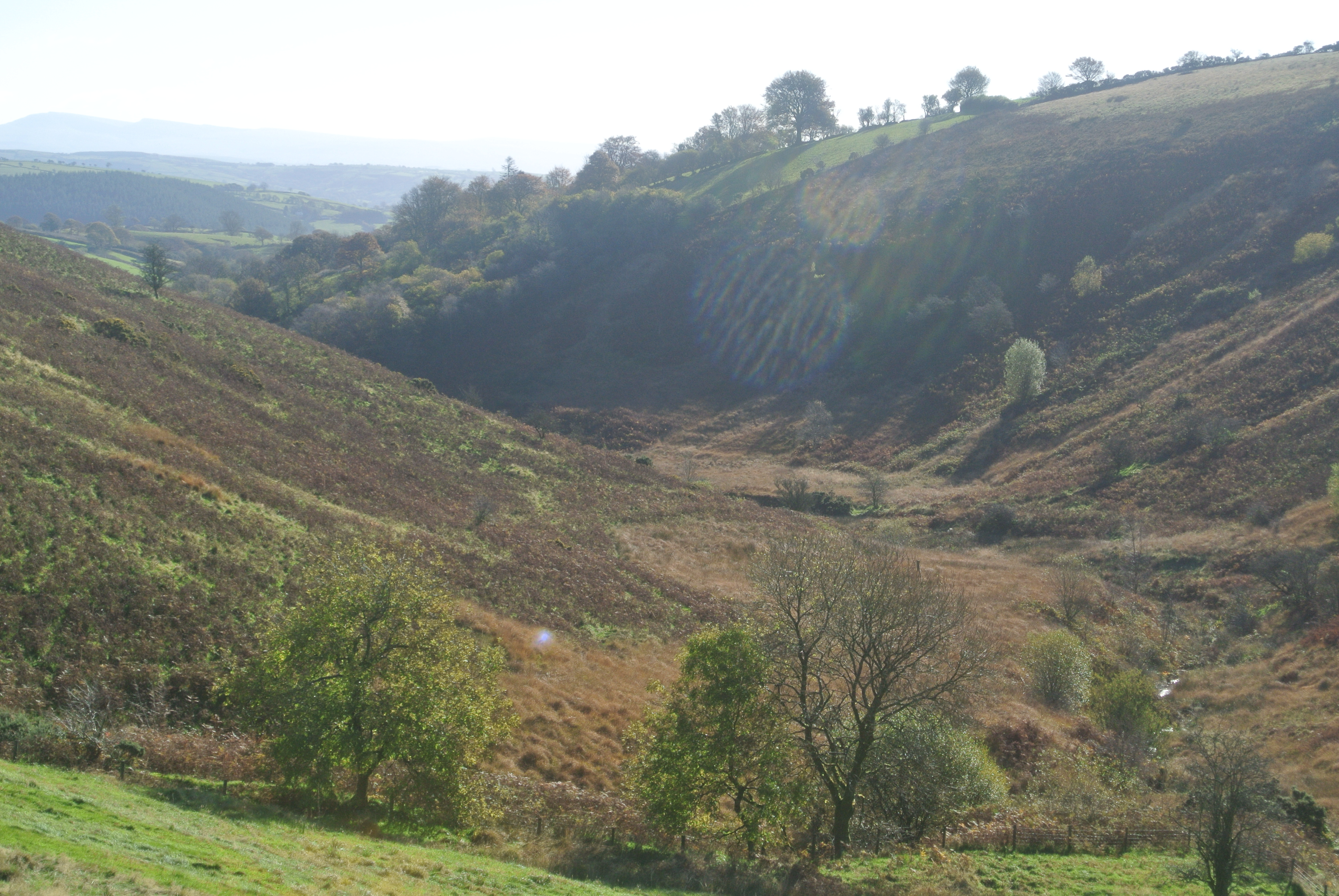
Cefn Blaenau SSSI, Carmarthenshire, Wales, 2012

The headwaters of the River Marlais (a tributary of the Cothi) run through the valley bottom in a series of mires, merging into areas of wet healthy pasture dominated by purple moor-grass (Molinia caerulea) and rich in sedges. In the very wet, flushed mire areas there are many bog-mosses Danthonia decumbens (Sphagnum spp.) and other localized plants such as:

- marsh St John's-wort (Hypericum elodes),
- round-leaved sundew (Drosera rotundifolia),
- common butterwort (Pinguicula vulgaris), and
- bog pondweed (Potamogeton polygonifolius).

At the base of the valley slopes, boggy areas contain common cottongrass (Eriophorum angustifolium), cross-leaved heath (Erica tetralix), common bilberry (Vaccinium myrtillus), marsh lousewort (Pedicularis palustris), and many-stalked spike-rush (Eleocharis multicaulis). The wet pasture supports uncommon species such as whorled caraway (Carum verticillatum), bog asphodel (Narthecium ossifragum), and heath spotted-orchid (Dactylorhiza maculata subsp. ericetorum).

Along streamsides, linear areas of poor-fen vegetation occur, including various rushes (Juncus spp.), ragged-robin (Lychnis flos-cuculi), marsh thistle (Cirsium palustre), greater bird's-foot-trefoil (Lotus uliginosus), marsh bedstraw (Galium palustre), sneezewort (Achillea ptarmica), marsh marigold (Caltha palustris), meadowsweet (Filipendula ulmaria), meadow vetchling (Lathyrus pratensis), devil's-bit scabious (Succisa pratensis), and lady-fern (Athyrium filix-femina). More open areas along these streamsides favour the uncommon ivy-leaved bellflower (Wahlenbergia hederacea) and bog pimpernel (Lysimachia tenella, syn. Anagallis tenella).

The drier valley slopes have grazed acidic grassland characterized by tormentil (Potentilla erecta), wavy hair-grass (Deschampsia flexuosa), heath bedstraw (Galium saxatile), pig nut (Conopodium majus), and mosses (Polytrichum spp.).

Distinctive wet flushes descend these dry slopes and, where there is a deeper accumulation of soil, bracken (Pteridium aquilinum) is dominant, interspersed with grass-heath areas and willow and hawthorn scrub. These ffridd areas are important for birds, particularly nesting:

- whinchat,
- tree pipit,
- yellowhammer,
- linnet,
- curlew, and
- grasshopper warbler.

Red kites, buzzards, sparrow hawks, kestrels, and goshawks are a common sight in the valley.

On the south-facing slopes of the valley, adjacent to the SSSI, there are a number of traditionally managed hay meadows where various wildflowers are present, such as meadow buttercup (Ranunculus acris), oxeye daisy (Chrysanthemum leucanthemum), yarrow (Achillea millefolium), black knapweed (Centaurea nigra), self-heal (Prunella vulgaris), red clover (Trifolium pratense), yellow rattle (Rhinanthus minor), common eyebright (Euphrasia nemorosa), common cat's ear (Hypochaeris radicata), and smooth hawksbeard (Crepis capillaris).

Four species of fritillary butterfly – marsh (Euphydryas aurinia), small pearl-bordered (Boloria selene), dark green (Speyeria aglaja), and silver-washed (Argynnis paphia) – have been noted. The marsh and small pearl-bordered fritillaries occur in the wet pastures, whilst the dark green is found on the drier bracken slopes and the silver-washed in the tree canopy. All have declined nationally and are local species, now principally of south-western Britain. Rare and also present is the brown hairstreak (Thecla betulae), while the small copper (Lycaena phlaeas) and green hairstreak (Callophrys rubi) are notably abundant.

Another species of note, found in the wet flushed areas, is the nationally uncommon keeled skimmer dragonfly (Orthetrum coerulescens). This is a species of southern wet heathlands whose larvae develop in the wet mud of base-enriched flushes or bog pools. The valley is particularly rich in Odonata species: dragonflies recorded include the emperor (Anax imperator), golden-ringed (Cordulegaster boltonii), broad-bodied chaser (Libellula depressa), four-spotted chaser (Libellula quadrimaculata), southern hawker (Aeshna cyanea), common hawker (Aeshna juncea), black-tailed skimmer (Orthetrum cancellatum), common darter (Sympetrum striolatum), and black darter (Sympetrum danae); damselflies include the large red (Pyrrhosoma nymphula), azure (Coenagrion puella), emerald (Lestes sponsa), common blue (Enallagma cyathigerum), blue-tailed (Ischnura elegans), scarce blue-tailed (Ischnura pumilio), and beautiful demoiselle (Calopteryx virgo).

The area is home to a good population of mustelids, such as badger, otter, weasel, stoat, polecat, and pine marten. Brown hares are also present.

The site is under private ownership and there is no public access, except with the permission of the owners.

== See also ==
- List of Sites of Special Scientific Interest in Carmarthen and Dinefwr
