= Coed Cochion Quarry =

Protected area in Carmarthenshire, Wales

- Site of Special Scientific Interest
- Location within Carmarthenshire
- Location of Coed Cochion Quarry.
- Area of search: Carmarthenshire
- Grid reference: SN333146
- Coordinates: 51.80515°N 4.41739°W
- Area: 0.04 hectares (0.099 acres)
- Notification date: 1981

Coed Cochion Quarry is a Site of Special Scientific Interest (SSSI) in Carmarthenshire, Wales, in which the geology of the site has preserved rare Precambrian fossils.

== SSSI ==
Coed Cochion Quarry SSSI is a very small quarry of 0.4 hectares (0.99 acres) located approximately 1 mile (1.6 km) south of Llangynog and 1.3 miles (2.1 km) north of Llanybri, north-east of the Taf Estuary.

The site is a rare example in the world of Precambrian fossil records - greater than 0.5 billion years old - found in the ashy siltstone sedimentary rock. A number of fossils of medusoid creatures - visually like, but maybe not in fact contemporary jellyfish - are present, as are feeding trails of other creatures. The evidence is that the site was once a sandy, silty shoreline in which soft-bodied fauna became buried.

== See also ==
- List of Sites of Special Scientific Interest in Carmarthenshire
