= Cae Gwynfryn =

Protected area in Carmarthenshire, Wales

- Site of Special Scientific Interest
- Location within Wales
- Location of Cae Gwynfryn.
- Area of search: Carmarthenshire
- Grid reference: SN5810410945
- Coordinates: 51.77913°N 4.05827°W
- Interest: Biological
- Area: 1.07 ha (2.6 acres)
- Notification date: 26 May1988

Cae Gwynfryn is an unimproved grassland that is a Site of Special Scientific Interest in Carmarthen & Dinefwr, Wales.

== See also ==
- List of Sites of Special Scientific Interest in Carmarthen & Dinefwr
