= Derwen-fach Meadow =

Protected area in Carmarthenshire, Wales

Derwen-fach Meadow is a pasture that is Site of Special Scientific Interest in Carmarthen & Dinefwr, Wales.

== See also ==
- List of Sites of Special Scientific Interest in Carmarthen & Dinefwr
