= Rhos Dolau-Bran =

Protected area in Carmarthenshire, Wales

Rhos Dolau-Bran is a part of the valley of the Brân River that is a Site of Special Scientific Interest in Carmarthen & Dinefwr, Wales.

== See also ==
- List of Sites of Special Scientific Interest in Carmarthen & Dinefwr
