= Carreg Cennan =

Protected area in Carmarthenshire, Wales

Coordinates: 51.8546°N 3.9325°W

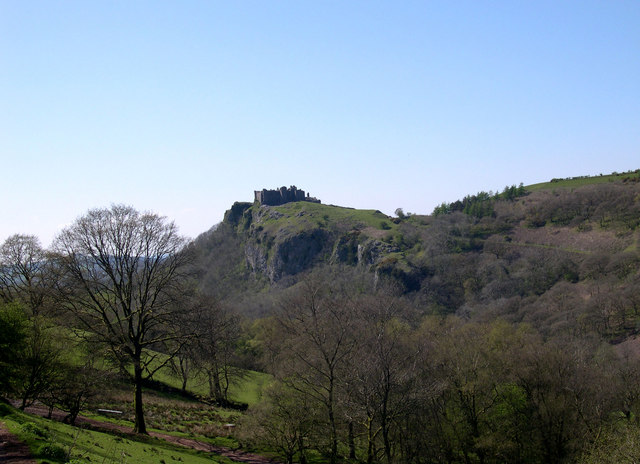
Carreg Cennan SSSI

Carreg Cennan is a Site of Special Scientific Interest (SSSI) in Carmarthenshire, Wales (Grid reference SN670191). The site consists of a 19.5-hectare (48-acre) strip of land surrounding a line of carboniferous limestone cliffs.

The site includes the spectacular limestone cliffs topped by Carreg Cennen Castle, as well as broadleaved woodland and limestone grassland.

== See also ==
- List of Sites of Special Scientific Interest in Carmarthenshire
