= Wernbongam Stream Section and Quarry =

Protected area in Carmarthenshire, Wales

Wernbongam Stream Section and Quarry is a Site of Special Scientific Interest in Carmarthen & Dinefwr, Wales.

== See also ==
- List of Sites of Special Scientific Interest in Carmarthen & Dinefwr
