= Kaggaladu =

Village in Karnataka, India

- Location within Karnataka
- Location: Karnataka, India
- Nearest city: Tumkuru
- Coordinates: 13°49′0″N 76°51′0″E
- Established: 1999
- Governing body: Gram Panchayat, Karnataka Forest Department

Kaggaladu is a village in the Sira Taluk of Tumkur district in the south of Karnataka, India. It is located 9 km to the northwest of Sira, a town on the Sira-Changavara Main Road. Since 1999, trees in Kaggaladu have been a breeding ground and haven for painted storks and grey herons. The heronry was first made known to the outside world in 1999 by Wildlife Aware Nature Club, an NGO based in Tumkur.

== History ==
=== Heronry ===
According to locals, the grey herons have been nesting here on a single tamarind tree since 1993. Their numbers increased in 1996, when a lone tree in the neighbouring Muddenahalli, on which these birds were nesting, was disturbed by poachers and some birds were killed. The villagers are so interested in conserving the birds that, they do not harvest the tamarind in the trees owned by them as well that of the Government. While many of the villagers are interested in protecting the birds just because they look beautiful, a few believe them as harbingers of prosperity, hence their protection.

== Fauna ==
As the area lies on the plains of the Deccan Plateau, bordering Andhra Pradesh, the wildlife found here is typical of that of dry areas. Several herds of blackbuck roam around Kaggaladu and surrounding villages.

== Kaggadalu Bird Sanctuary ==
Birds usually stay in the Kaggaladu Bird Sanctuary for about six months, arriving in February in groups for the nesting season. By the end of August, the migratory birds depart.

Kaggaladu is said to be the second largest painted stork sanctuary in South India, after the Kokrebellur sanctuary in Mandya district, Karnataka. It has been observed that many birds of foreign origin also migrate to Kaggaladu during the nesting season. The tamarind trees have been maintained for birds' shelter and nesting. The villagers of Kaggaladu are very much attached to these migrating birds.
