= Ffair Fach Railway Cutting and River Section =

Protected area in Carmarthenshire, Wales

Ffair Fach Railway Cutting and River Section is a cut in Wales that exposes the geology and fossils of the region. It is a Site of Special Scientific Interest in Carmarthen & Dinefwr, Wales.

== See also ==
- List of Sites of Special Scientific Interest in Carmarthen & Dinefwr
