= Caeau Ffos Fach =

Protected area in Carmarthenshire, Wales

- Site of Special Scientific Interest
- Location within Wales
- Location of Caeau Ffos Fach.
- Area of search: Carmarthenshire
- Grid reference: SN5752712143
- Coordinates: 51.789747°N 4.0671203°W
- Interest: Biological
- Area: 12.49 ha (30.9 acres)
- Notification date: 30 March 1984

Caeau Ffos Fach is a Site of Special Scientific Interest in Carmarthen & Dinefwr, Wales. Part of this SSSI is a nature reserve owned by the charity Butterfly Conservation primarily because of the population of the rare and legally protected butterfly species the marsh fritillary.

== Geography ==
The Caeau Ffos Fach Site of Special Scientific Interest (SSSI) is one of three areas that form the wider Caeau Mynydd Mawr Special Area of Conservation (SAC), along with Caeau Lotwen and Broad Oak and Thornhill Meadows. It is located near the village of Cross Hands There is a privately owned property on the site, Greengrove Farm.

The presence of a population of marsh fritillary butterflies has led to the site being taken under conservation management by the Butterfly Conservation charity. The reserve was opened in 2003. Since 2006, cattle have been introduced in order to graze the area and scrub management is carried out annually by volunteers to maintain the site. The work by Butterfly Conservation led to an increase in the butterfly population at one point in time. An area of the adjacent Median Farm of around 10 hectares (25 acres) is also leased by Butterfly conservation from NRW.

A survey of the marsh fritillary butterflies carried out in the mid-1990s by the Countryside Council for Wales, a precursor to NRW, noted that Caeau Ffos Fach had the highest population in the Dinefwr Borough, with nearly 50% of the sightings recorded being listed at the site.

== See also ==
- List of Sites of Special Scientific Interest in Carmarthen & Dinefwr
