= Cwm Clydach, Kidwelly =

Protected area in Carmarthenshire, Wales

Cwm Clydach, Cydweli
- Site of Special Scientific Interest
- Location of Cwm Clydach, Cydweli.
- Area of search: Carmarthenshire
- Area: 8 ha (20 acres)
- Notification date: 1998

Cwm Clydach is a Site of Special Scientific Interest in Carmarthenshire, Wales. The site is located 4 kilometres from the coast and the town of Kidwelly.

The site is of special interest for its plant population of lichens and ferns. Cwm Clydach is a deep ravine cut into a low ridge sandstones, popularly known as the "Farewell Rock".

== See also ==
- List of SSSIs in Carmarthenshire
