= Llanfallteg Track Section =

Protected area in Carmarthenshire, Wales

Llanfallteg Track Section is an area displaying Ordovician stratigraphy that is a Site of Special Scientific Interest in Carmarthen & Dinefwr, Wales.

== See also ==
- List of Sites of Special Scientific Interest in Carmarthen & Dinefwr
