= Gordon Lewis (rugby) =

Former GB & Wales international rugby league footballer

Gordon Hale Lewis
Personal information
- Full name: Gordon Hale Lewis
- Born: 23 June 1936 (age 90) Mynydd-y-Garreg, Wales

Playing information

Rugby union
Club
Years	Team	Pld	T	G	FG	P
1956–58	Swansea RFC	25	4			12

Rugby league
- Position: Centre
Club
Years	Team	Pld	T	G	FG	P
1958–71	Leigh	386	112			336
1971–73	Swinton	20	8			24
	Total	406	120	0	0	360
Representative
Years	Team	Pld	T	G	FG	P
1965	Other Nationalities	1
1959–70	Wales	35	22	0	0	6
1965	Great Britain	1	0	0	0	0

Gordon Hale Lewis (born 23 June 1936) is a Welsh former rugby union, and professional rugby league footballer who played in the 1950s, 1960s and 1970s. He played club level rugby union (RU) for Swansea RFC, and representative level rugby league (RL) for Great Britain, Wales and Other Nationalities, and at club level for Leigh, and Swinton, as a centre.

== Background ==
Gordon Lewis was born in Mynydd-y-Garreg, Wales

== Playing career ==
=== International honours ===
Gordon Lewis won caps for Wales (RL) while at Leigh in 1959 against France, in 1963 against France, in 1969 against France, and in 1970 against France, and England, won a cap for Great Britain (RL) while at Leigh in 1965 against New Zealand, and represented Other Nationalities (RL) while at Leigh, he played at centre in the 2–19 defeat by St. Helens at Knowsley Road, St. Helens on Wednesday 27 January 1965, to mark the switching-on of new floodlights.

=== County Cup Final appearances ===
Gordon Lewis played at centre in Leigh's 4–15 defeat by St Helens in the 1963–64 Lancashire Cup Final during the 1963–64 season at Knowsley Road, St. Helens on Saturday 26 October 1963.

=== BBC2 Floodlit Trophy Final appearances ===
Gordon Lewis played at centre in Leigh's 5–8 defeat by Castleford in the 1967 BBC2 Floodlit Trophy Final during the 1967–68 season at Headingley, Leeds on Saturday 16 January 1968.

== Personal ==
Gordon lives in Leigh (Wigan) with his wife Pamela. They have two children; Anne and Anthony, and four grandchildren; Samantha, Matthew, Alexandra and Francesca.
