= Llety-wen =

Protected area in Carmarthenshire, Wales

Llety-wen is a farm that is a Site of Special Scientific Interest in Carmarthen & Dinefwr, Wales.

== See also ==
- List of Sites of Special Scientific Interest in Carmarthen & Dinefwr
