= Glan Pibwr Stream Section =

Protected area in Carmarthenshire, Wales

- Site of Special Scientific Interest
- Location within Wales
- Location of Glan Pibwr Stream Section.
- Area of search: Wales
- Grid reference: SN 4161717975
- Coordinates: 51.83785°N 4.30027°W

Glan Pibwr Stream Section is a Site of Special Scientific Interest in Carmarthen & Dinefwr, Wales. Datasets for various species associated with this area, under a variety of designations, are available.

== See also ==
- List of Sites of Special Scientific Interest in Carmarthen & Dinefwr
