= Mynydd Llangyndeyrn =

Protected area in Carmarthenshire, Wales

- Site of Special Scientific Interest
- Location within Carmarthenshire
- Location of Mynydd Llangyndeyrn.
- Area of search: Carmarthenshire
- Grid reference: SN486134
- Coordinates: 51.79731°N 4.19721°W
- Area: 85.2 hectares (0.8520 km^{2}; 0.3290 sq mi)
- Notification date: 1992

Mynydd Llangyndeyrn is a Site of Special Scientific Interest (SSSI) in Carmarthen & Dinefwr, Wales, and a hill reaching 263 metres (863 feet), which is a Marilyn.

Mynydd Llangyndeyrn and the SSSI are located west of Drefach and north of Pontyberem. The SSSI is approximately 1.3 miles (2.1 km) east-west and 0.3 miles (0.48 km) north-south, taking the approximate shape of a horns downwards shallow crescent.

The SSSI citation for Mynydd Llangyndeyrn specifies that it is "notable as one of the larger upland semi-natural areas left in south-west Wales which, unlike most others, remains lightly grazed." The site features marshy grassland, wet heath, and dry heath, and hosts the marsh fritillary butterfly (Euphydryas aurinia).

== See also ==
- List of Sites of Special Scientific Interest in Carmarthen & Dinefwr
