= Mynydd Ystyfflau-Carn =

Protected area in Carmarthenshire, Wales

Mynydd Ystyfflau-carn
- Site of Special Scientific Interest
- Location within Wales
- Location of Mynydd Ystyfflau-carn.
- Area of search: Wales
- Grid reference: SN4689626642
- Coordinates: 51.917198°N 4.2275644°W
- Interest: Biological
- Area: 53.8 ha (133 acres)
- Notification date: 15 May 1990

Mynydd Ystyfflau-Carn is a Site of Special Scientific Interest in Carmarthenshire, Wales.

== See also ==
- List of Sites of Special Scientific Interest in Carmarthen & Dinefwr
