= Felin Fach Meadows, Cwmgwili =

Protected area in Carmarthenshire, Wales

- Site of Special Scientific Interest
- Area of search: Carmarthenshire
- Area: 11 ha (27 acres)
- Notification date: 1986

Felin Fach Meadows, Cwmgwili is a Site of Special Scientific Interest in Carmarthenshire, Wales.

== See also ==
- List of SSSIs in Carmarthenshire
