= Cwm Crymlyn Road Section =

Protected area in Carmarthenshire, Wales

Cwm Crymlyn Road Section is an exposed area of Tremadoc rocks that is a Site of Special Scientific Interest in Carmarthen & Dinefwr, Wales.

== See also ==
- List of Sites of Special Scientific Interest in Carmarthen & Dinefwr
