= Cwm yr Abbey Stream Section =

Protected area in Carmarthenshire, Wales

Cwm yr Abbey Stream Section is a locality of Arenig faunal and stratigraphic significance. It is a Site of Special Scientific Interest in Carmarthen & Dinefwr, Wales.

== See also ==
- List of Sites of Special Scientific Interest in Carmarthen & Dinefwr
