= Rhos Pwllygawnen =

Protected area in Carmarthenshire, Wales

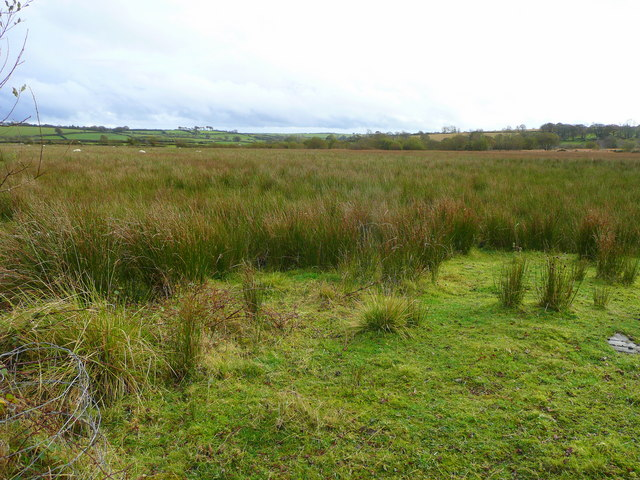
Rhos Pwllygawnen

Rhos Pwllygawnen is an area of pasture that is a Site of Special Scientific Interest in Carmarthen & Dinefwr, Wales.

== See also ==
- List of Sites of Special Scientific Interest in Carmarthen & Dinefwr
