= Mynydd-y-Garreg =

Village in Carmarthenshire, Wales

Coordinates: 51.7499°N 4.2794°W

Mynydd-y-garreg
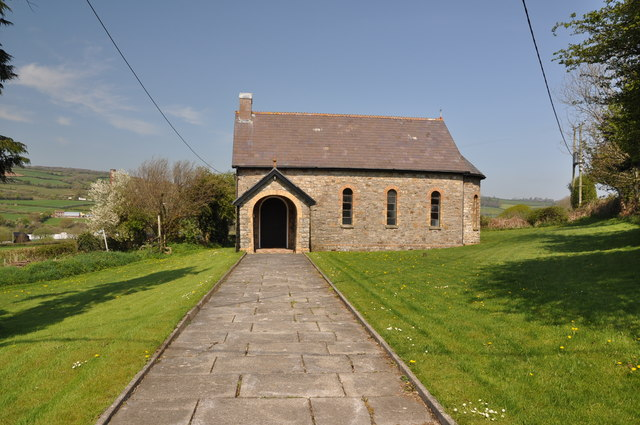
- St Teilo's Church, Mynyddygarreg
- OS grid reference: SN427081
- Community: Kidwelly
- Principal area: Carmarthenshire
- Preserved county: Dyfed
- Country: Wales
- Sovereign state: United Kingdom
- Post town: KIDWELLY
- Postcode district: SA17
- Dialling code: 01554
- Police: Dyfed-Powys
- Fire: Mid and West Wales
- Ambulance: Welsh
- UK Parliament: Llanelli
- Senedd Cymru – Welsh Parliament: Llanelli

Mynydd-y-Garreg or Mynyddygarreg ("The mountain of the stone") is a village in the county of Carmarthenshire, West Wales. It borders the historic town of Kidwelly.

== Governance ==
Mynydd-y-Garreg is in the Kidwelly community and shares with it a mayor and an elected council, Kidwelly Town Council.

== Transport ==
By road, the village lies 1 km from the A484, which connects Llanelli and Carmarthen. For rail travel, Kidwelly railway station lies 4 km (2.5 miles) away by road. It provides a two-hourly daytime service on Mondays to Saturdays. Some trains reach as far as London and Manchester.

Bus services through Kidwelly provide links to Llanelli, Carmarthen, Swansea and other places.

== Amenities ==
The village has a Welsh-medium primary school, Ysgol Mynydd-y-Garreg School.

The county mobile library service visits the village every Wednesday between 11.30 and 12.30.

The Bro Cydweli LMA group parish of the Church in Wales provides a bilingual afternoon service on the first and third Sundays of the month at St Teilo's Church, Mynyddygarreg. Saint Teilo (c. 500 – 9 c. 560) was a 6th-century British monk and early Welsh saint from Pembrokeshire.

The village has a local rugby union team called Mynydd-y-Garreg RFC. It offers training facilities and a playing field with a clubhouse.

The public house in the village, the Prince of Wales, had been recognised by the Campaign for Real Ale (CAMRA) Good Beer Guide. Nonetheless, it had to close in 2017.

== Notable residents ==
- Tom Beynon (1886–1961), a Presbyterian minister, author and noted historian; born and grew up in Mynydd-y-Garreg.
- Leslie Williams (1922–2006), a Welsh dual-code international rugby union, and professional rugby league footballer
- Gordon Lewis (born 1936), a Welsh former rugby union, and professional rugby league footballer with over 400 club caps
- Ray Gravell (1951–2007), Welsh national rugby union player; a road there was named after him, and after his death a sculpture erected in his honour at the Llanelli Scarlets' stadium Parc y Scarlets, where it stands on a plinth of stone quarried from the village.

== Fossil remains ==
Smarts Quarry, half a mile to the east of the village, is a 2.6 ha Site of Special Scientific Interest notable for its quartzite fossil remains.
