= Llanstephan Cliffs =

Protected area in Carmarthenshire, Wales

Creigiau Llansteffan (Llanstephan Cliffs)
- Site of Special Scientific Interest
- Area of search: Carmarthenshire
- Area: 3 ha (7.4 acres)
- Notification date: 1972

Llanstephan Cliffs is a Site of Special Scientific Interest in Carmarthenshire, Wales. The geological information about Llanstephan Cliffs highlights their composition of sedimentary rock formations, which are crucial for studying geological history and fossil records. The cliffs reveal layers of rock that can provide insights into the processes that formed them and the ancient environments they represent. This geological significance is a primary reason for their designation as a Site of Special Scientific Interest (SSSI).

== See also ==
- List of SSSIs in Carmarthenshire
