= Leslie Williams (rugby) =

Wales international dual-code rugby footballer (1922–2006)

Les Williams
Personal information
- Full name: William Leslie Thomas Williams
- Born: 10 May 1922 Mynydd-y-Garreg, Wales
- Died: 27 January 2006 (aged 83) Falmouth, Cornwall, England

Playing information

Rugby union
- Position: Wing, Centre
Club
Years	Team	Pld	T	G	FG	P
	Llanelli RFC
	Cardiff RFC
	Total	0	0	0	0	0
Representative
Years	Team	Pld	T	G	FG	P
1947–49	Wales	7	3	0	0	9

Rugby league
- Position: Wing
Club
Years	Team	Pld	T	G	FG	P
1949–55	Hunslet	229	110	1	0	332
Representative
Years	Team	Pld	T	G	FG	P
1949–53	Wales	15	5	0	0	15

William Leslie "Les" Thomas Williams (10 May 1922 – 27 January 2006) was a Welsh dual-code international rugby union, and professional rugby league footballer who played in the 1940s and 1950s. He played representative level rugby union (RU) for Wales, and at club level for Llanelli RFC and Cardiff RFC, as a wing or centre, and representative level rugby league (RL) for Wales, and at club level for Hunslet, as a wing or centre.

== Background ==
Williams was born in Mynydd-y-Garreg, Wales, and he died aged 83 in Falmouth, Cornwall, England.

== International honours ==
Williams won 15 caps for Wales (RU) in 1949–1953 while at Llanelli RFC in 1947 against England, Scotland, France, and Ireland, and while at Cardiff RFC in 1947 against Australia, in 1948 against Ireland, and in 1949 against England, and won caps for Wales (RL) while at Hunslet.
