= Brechfa =

Village in Carmarthenshire, Wales

Coordinates: 51.951833°N 4.147010°W

- Location within Carmarthenshire
- OS grid reference: SN525303
- Community: Llanfihangel Rhos-y-Corn
- Principal area: Carmarthenshire
- Preserved county: Dyfed
- Country: Wales
- Sovereign state: United Kingdom
- Post town: CARMARTHEN
- Postcode district: SA32
- Police: Dyfed-Powys
- Fire: Mid and West Wales
- Ambulance: Welsh
- UK Parliament: Caerfyrddin
- Senedd Cymru – Welsh Parliament: Carmarthen East and Dinefwr
- Website: https://web.archive.org/web/20070627171207/http://www.brechfa.info/

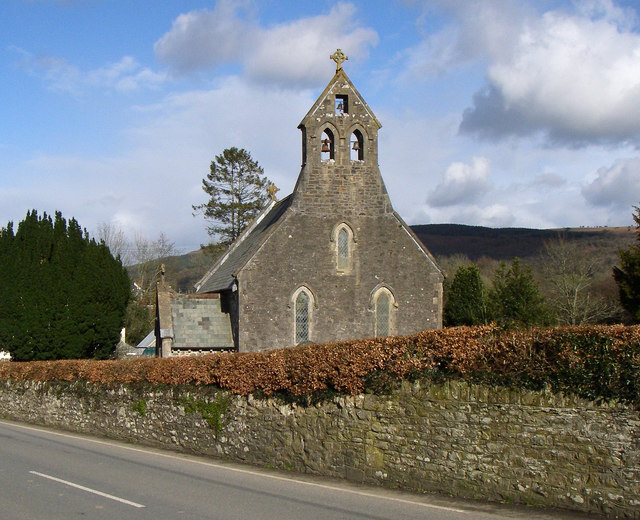

Brechfa, situated between Llandeilo and Carmarthen in the county of Carmarthenshire, Wales, is a village that has existed since the 6th century at the top of the Cothi Valley. Brechfa village is set in countryside, as well as being located by the Brechfa Forest

== History ==
In the 1840s, Brechfa featured in the Rebecca Riots when rioters destroyed tollgates on the local turnpike road. During the 1930s Great Depression, unemployed men were sent to work on the Forestry Commission land, breaking ground, building tracks, and undertaking other heavy labour. The men lived in a work camp in Brechfa, which was one of a number of Instructional Centres run by the Ministry of Labour.

== Location and amenities ==
The village has a bridge over the river that links both sides of the village.

St. Teilo's Church is based in the middle of the Brechfa and replaced the former church building in 1893. The stone from the former church building was used to build the current church hall which is situated directly opposite St. Teilo's Church.

The Bryn Stores Community Store is a co-operative has been set up to run the village shop, which featured in an article in The Daily Telegraph Magazine in 2007. The village was chosen as a special stage in the British Rally from 2006 to 2008.

The Forest Arms, the public house located in the centre of Brechfa, featuring open fires, food and drink and car parking to the front and rear. The pub was closed between 2006 and 2014, and was re-opened in April 2014.

The hotel (http://wales-country-hotel.co.uk) Ty Mawr dates from 1658 and was converted into a hotel by Jill and Cliff Ross in 1979 having purchased the property at auction in 1976 for £10,000. The hotel has now six rooms, all en suit and a mature garden, fireplaces and the original stonework throughout. The restaurant uses fresh locally sourced ingredients and can be booked by guests and non guests alike. The hotel has featured in Welsh rarebits for over fifteen years along with the hotel guide.

== Leisure & Recreation ==
Brechfa Forest is a mixture of ancient forest and managed woodlands containing mountain bike trails as well as promoted walks and rides, at the top of the Cothi Valley. The managed woodlands of the forest is managed by Natural Resources Wales.

The village is the site of Brechfa Mountain Biking which have a number of free car parks with picnic and BBQ facilities. In Byrgwm car park there is The Shed café for those riding the Raven or Derwen Trails.

Brechfa Forest provides 17,300 acres of open access for horse riders, who can use any of the tracks within the forest. A number of bridleways and byways run across the farmland and common land surrounding the forest to enable equestrian visitors to enjoy a variety of rides.

The River Cothi is the largest tributary of the River Tywi in south Wales. It is noted for its trout and sea trout (sewin) fishing and for salmon. The Cothi valley runs through the Brechfa Forest joining the Tywi (or Towy if you prefer the English spelling) a few miles south of Brechfa.

Brechfa was chosen as a special stage in the British Rally from 2006 to 2008.

== Local radio ==
Pupils of Bro Myrddin Welsh Comprehensive School, Carmarthen have launched Brechfa FM, an on-demand podcast website on the bebo network. The comedy radio station portrays the Brechfa residents as very isolated people who have no contact with the "outside world" such as Carmarthen.
Brechfa Radio Podcast Site

== Notable people ==
- William Thomas (Gwilym Marles) was born in Brechfa
- Canon Patrick Thomas (author and cleric) Rector of Brechfa from 1984 to 2001. His books include Candle in the Darkness, Celtic Spirituality from Wales (Gomer), Celtic Earth, Celtic Heaven (Gomer), Brechfa and Beyond: Peregrinations of a Parish Priest (Carreg Gwalch), From Carmarthen to Karabagh: a Welsh discovery of Armenia (Carreg Gwalch), and Remembering the Armenian Genocide (Carreg Gwalch). His translations of Welsh poet David Gwenallt Jones are included in the volume Sensuous Glory written with Densil Morgan and Donald Allchin (Canterbury Press)
