= Pine Lodge Meadow =

Protected area in Carmarthenshire, Wales

Pine Lodge Meadow is small hay meadow that is a Site of Special Scientific Interest in Carmarthen & Dinefwr, Wales.

== See also ==
- List of Sites of Special Scientific Interest in Carmarthen & Dinefwr
