= Tom Beynon (Presbyterian minister) =

Welsh minister and historian

Tom Beynon (1886 – 10 February 1961) was a Welsh Presbyterian minister, author and historian.

== Life ==
Tom Beynon was born to William and Elizabeth Beynon and grew up in Mynydd-y-Garreg, Carmarthenshire. After completing local schooling in 1903, he began work in the Pontyberem area, where he attended the local Soar Church and began preaching. Soon after he entered training at the Old College School, Carmarthen, then took further training at Newcastle Emlyn Grammar School and Bala Theological College, and was ordained a pastor of the Tabernacle of Blaengwynfi, Glamorgan, in 1916. He went on to serve at Horeb and Gosen near Aberystwyth (1933–1951).

== Writings ==
Beynon was an enthusiastic historian of Calvinistic Methodism in Wales. His writings appeared in Y Drysorfa, Y Goleuad, Y Traethodydd, and in local papers such as the Llanelly Mercury and the Welsh Gazette. His essays were issued in collections: Golud a Mawl Dyffryn Tywi (1936), Gwrid ar Orwel ym Morgannwg (1938), Treftadaeth y Cenfu a Maes Gwenllian (1941), Cwmsêl a Chefn Sidan (1946), and Allt Cunedda, Llechdwnni a Mwdlwscwm (1955). He also edited and contributed to the Journal of the Calvinistic Methodist History Society between 1933 and 1947.

Tom Beynon died at his home in Penparcau, Aberystwyth, in February 1961 and was buried in Mynydd-y-Garreg.
