= Waun-Ddu =

Protected area in Carmarthenshire, Wales

Waun-ddu
- Site of Special Scientific Interest
- Location within Wales
- Location of Waun-ddu.
- Area of search: Wales
- Grid reference: SN8214430535
- Coordinates: 51.960767°N 3.7166736°W
- Interest: Biological
- Area: 35.42 ha (87.5 acres)
- Notification date: 1 January 1973

Waun-Ddu is a part of the Mynydd Bach that is a Site of Special Scientific Interest in Carmarthen & Dinefwr, Wales.

== See also ==
- List of Sites of Special Scientific Interest in Carmarthen & Dinefwr
