= Lakeridge, West Hill =

Neighborhood in Washington, US

Coordinates: 47°30′23″N 122°14′40″W

Lakeridge
- Neighborhood
- Interactive map of Lakeridge
- Country: United States
- State: Washington
- County: King
- City: Seattle (partial)
- Platted: 1928
- Named for: Lake Washington

Lakeridge is a hillside neighborhood near Lake Washington located mostly in unincorporated Skyway/West Hill in King County, Washington, and partially in the City of Seattle. Its boundaries extend from Seattle's Rainier Beach neighborhood on the north, to Lake Washington on the east, to unincorporated Bryn Mawr on the southeast and unincorporated Skyway on the southwest.

== History and plats ==
In 1928, developer E. S. Goodwin filed a plat for part of a hillside and uplands above the southwestern shore of Lake Washington and called it Lakeridge. The Seattle Planning Commission adopted that name for the neighborhood in 1947. Plat maps identify four divisions: Lakeridge Division #1 is the easternmost and closest to Lake Washington. Divisions #2, #3, and #4 are located successively higher up the hillside to the west and continue over the ridge top. Division #3 spans the border of unincorporated King County and the City of Seattle. The Seattle portion of Division #3 and all of Division #4 make up part of Seattle's Rainier View neighborhood. Two hundred and forty-one Lakeridge tax parcels are located inside the Seattle City limits.

== Architecture and aesthetics ==
Lakeridge is characterized by winding streets and mid-century modest architecture. The lake views, mature vegetation and curving streets give an appealing aspect to the neighborhood. In some spots, the lake views are breathtaking. Many of the homes in Lakeridge are one-story ramblers, or ramblers with daylight basements, built in the post-World War II period between 1946 and 1959 using the highly functional and frequently seen 1-bedroom, 2-bedroom, and 3-bedroom Ranch House floor plans of the time. These layouts exemplify mid-century modest tract housing and some streets are lined with a number of nearly identical homes. When built, these were made more visually interesting by varying the percentage of brick (from none to 100%) and wood on the exteriors. They have been further varied by later additions of new rooms and sometimes a second story, as well as by mature landscaping and diverse exterior paint colors. A few individually architect-designed mid-century modern homes also are interspersed. Some pre-World War II homes are present and later mid-entry and contemporary modern homes in various styles have been built since 1960 as the original double lots have been divided. Although originally most homes had views of Lake Washington, today only an estimated 50% of homes still retain some view of the lake. Maturing trees, other tall landscape vegetation, and infill construction are gradually blocking the views which currently range from peeks through the trees to unobstructed 180-degree vistas.

== Lakeridge Park ==
Lakeridge Park, on the neighborhood’s northern edge, "occupies more than 35 acres of Taylor Creek and Deadhorse Canyon in southeast Seattle ... Taylor Creek is the fourth largest creek in Seattle and is the site of an urban creek restoration program that will attract salmon back to the creek to spawn. On April 19, 2000, under the leadership of Seattle Public Utilities, Seattle Department of Parks and Recreation, Cascadia Quest, and Friends of Deadhorse Canyon, volunteers planted native vegetation. Seattle Public Utilities replaced two culverts and when a culvert is replaced under Rainier Avenue South, salmon fry will be released into the creek. If the efforts are successful, the salmon will return to the creek to spawn."

== Annexation proposal ==
In 2005, the unincorporated areas of Lakeridge were included in the West Hill potential annexation area (PAA) of the City of Renton. This addition was ratified by King County in April 2006. In November 2012, the majority of residents of the unincorporated area and surrounding unincorporated neighborhoods voted to reject the proposed annexation. The area remains in Renton's potential annexation area, meaning that the City of Renton intends to eventually make the area part of the city through annexation.
