= Burry Inlet and Loughor Estuary =

Protected area in Carmarthenshire, Wales

- Site of Special Scientific Interest
- Area of search: Carmarthenshire
- Area: 5,851 ha (14,460 acres)
- Notification date: 1972

Burry Inlet and Loughor Estuary is a Site of Special Scientific Interest in Carmarthen, Wales.

== See also ==
- List of SSSIs in Carmarthenshire
