= Dinefwr Estate =

Protected area in Carmarthenshire, Wales

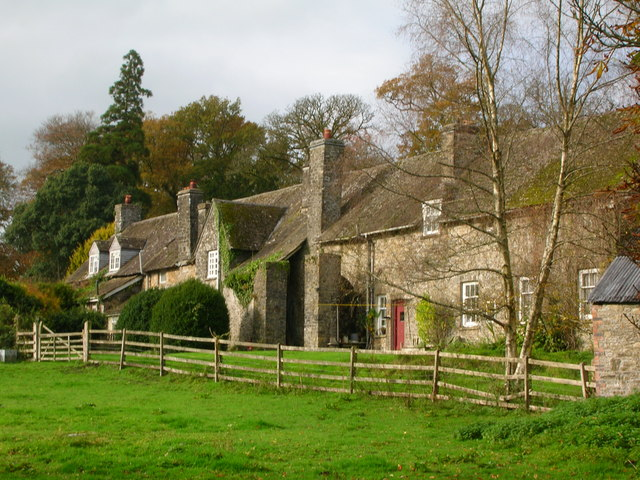
Cottages on the Dinefwr Estate

Dinefwr Estate is a Site of Special Scientific Interest in Carmarthen & Dinefwr, Wales. Much of the site is a deer park with veteran trees.

== See also ==
- List of Sites of Special Scientific Interest in Carmarthen & Dinefwr
