= Nant Gwys =

River in Powys, Wales

Coordinates: 51.78685°N 3.80213°W

The Nant Gwys is a river flowing off the Black Mountain (Y Mynydd Du) in Powys, Wales. Its tributaries Gwys Fawr and the Gwys Fach flow south from Banwen Gwyn and Bwlch y Ddeuwynt respectively and join forces to form the Nant Gwys proper which then flows for about 5 km (3 mi) to its confluence with Afon Twrch at Upper Cwmtwrch.

The upper reaches of the river and its tributaries lie within the Brecon Beacons National Park and within Fforest Fawr Geopark. The river is one of several which run down the southward directed dip-slopes of the Black Mountain passing from the Twrch Sandstone outcrop onto the mudstones of the Carboniferous Coal Measures.

The name translates from Welsh as 'sow stream', presumably in reference to the neighbouring Afon Twrch or 'boar river'.
