= Pembrey Coast =

Protected area in Carmarthenshire, Wales

Arfordir Pen-Bre/Pembrey Coast
- Site of Special Scientific Interest
- Area of search: Carmarthenshire
- Area: 4,132 ha (10,210 acres)
- Notification date: 1953

Pembrey Coast is a Site of Special Scientific Interest in Carmarthenshire, Wales.

== See also ==
- List of SSSIs in Carmarthenshire
