= Mandinam a Coed Deri =

Protected area in Carmarthenshire, Wales

- Site of Special Scientific Interest
- Location within Wales
- Location of Mandinam a Coed Deri.
- Area of search: Carmarthenshire
- Grid reference: SN7453927853
- Coordinates: 51.935°N 3.8263174°W
- Interest: Biological
- Area: 10.6 ha (26 acres)
- Notification date: 27 February 1986

Mandinam a Coed Deri is an area of woodland and pasture that is a Site of Special Scientific Interest in Carmarthen & Dinefwr, Wales.

== See also ==
- List of Sites of Special Scientific Interest in Carmarthen & Dinefwr
