= Rhosydd Castell-du & Plas-y-bettws =

Protected area in Carmarthenshire, Wales

Rhosydd Castell-du & Plas-y-bettws is an area of fen-meadow and grassland that is a Site of Special Scientific Interest in Carmarthen & Dinefwr, Wales.

== See also ==
- List of Sites of Special Scientific Interest in Carmarthen & Dinefwr
