= Waunfawr, Carmarthenshire =

Protected area in Carmarthenshire, Wales

Coordinates: 51.79872°N 4.18068°W

Waunfawr is an enclosed pasture that is a Site of Special Scientific Interest in Carmarthen & Dinefwr, Wales.

== See also ==
- List of Sites of Special Scientific Interest in Carmarthen & Dinefwr
