= Caeau Caradog =

Protected area in Carmarthenshire, Wales

- Site of Special Scientific Interest
- Location of Caeau Caradog.
- Area of search: Carmarthenshire
- Area: 17 ha (42 acres)
- Notification date: 2011

Caeau Caradog is a Site of Special Scientific Interest in Carmarthenshire, Wales.

== See also ==
- List of SSSIs in Carmarthenshire
