= Corsydd a Rwyth Cilyblaidd =

Protected area in Carmarthenshire, Wales

- Site of Special Scientific Interest
- Location within Wales
- Location of Corsydd a Rwyth Cilyblaidd.
- Area of search: Carmarthenshire
- Grid reference: SN5418845716
- Coordinates: 52.090527°N 4.1297411°W
- Interest: Wildlife
- Area: 3.83 ha (9.5 acres)
- Notification date: 3 September 1987

Corsydd a Rwyth Cilyblaidd is a wetland area that is a Site of Special Scientific Interest in Carmarthen & Dinefwr, Wales.

== See also ==
- List of Sites of Special Scientific Interest in Carmarthen & Dinefwr
