= Coed Gwempa =

Protected area in Carmarthenshire, Wales

- Site of Special Scientific Interest
- Location within Wales
- Location of Coed Gwempa.
- Area of search: Carmarthenshire
- Grid reference: SN4357611487
- Coordinates: 51.780125°N 4.2689365°W
- Interest: Biological
- Area: 18.34 ha (45.3 acres)
- Notification date: 9 March 1992

Coed Gwempa is a Site of Special Scientific Interest in Carmarthen & Dinefwr, Wales. It is managed by the Woodland Trust, who describe it as mixed native woodland and ancient trees with abundant floral species like bluebell, meadowsweet and dog violet. Dormice have also been observed.

== See also ==
- List of Sites of Special Scientific Interest in Carmarthen & Dinefwr
