= Bishops Pond =

Protected area in Carmarthenshire, Wales

Coordinates: 51.8654°N 4.2601°W

Bishops Pond (Welsh: Pwll yr Esgob) is a Site of Special Scientific Interest in Carmarthenshire, Wales, lying adjacent to the former palace of the Bishop of St Davids (now the Carmarthenshire County Museum). The pond is an oxbow lake, formed when a meander of the River Tywi got cut off from the main river. The water level is topped up in winter as the river floods the valley floor, and the level drops in summer. The pond exhibits a natural succession from lake through swamp to marsh, and will eventually become meadow; this happens because aquatic plants clog the water and there is a gradual build up of organic detritus.

== Features ==
Bishops Pond is particularly notable as the best example of an oxbow lake in West Wales. Another feature is the dominant reed sweet-grass, which only occurs in the Tywi Valley and coastal flats. The lake is fringed by reeds, sedges and grasses such as reed sweet-grass, bladder-sedge and branched bur-reed, and yellow water lilies float on the surface of the water in the summer. Other plants around the margin include water pepper, small bur-reed, European bur-reed, northern marsh yellowcress and trifid bur-marigold. There are also fronds of adders-tongue fern on the bank of the lake. Various deciduous trees grow round the lake, and a large island develops at the western end during the winter.

The lake contains tench, European perch, common roach, northern pike, eels, common minnows and three-spined sticklebacks, and may have once been stocked for coarse fishing purposes. Birds breeding here include kingfisher, white-throated dipper, mallard, Eurasian coot, common moorhen and mute swan, and other birds, including the little grebe visit in winter. The moth Donacaula forficella was recorded from Bishops Pond, a first record for inland Carmarthenshire.

== See also ==
- List of Sites of Special Scientific Interest in Carmarthen & Dinefwr
