= Afon Marlais, Carmarthenshire =

River in Carmarthenshire, Wales

Coordinates: 51.9493°N 4.1328°W

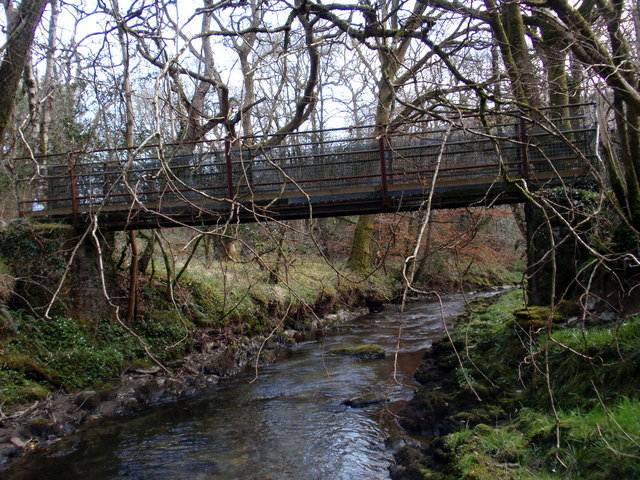
Afon Marlais

The Afon Marlais is a right-bank tributary of the Afon Cothi in Carmarthenshire, West Wales. It rises on the slopes of Mynydd Llanfihangel-rhos-y-corn and Mynydd Tre-beddau and flows south-eastwards through Brechfa Forest before reaching the village of Brechfa. After an additional kilometer, it joins the Cothi immediately downstream of Pont Ynys-Brechfa.
