= Llyn Pencarreg =

Lake in Carmarthenshire, Wales

Coordinates: 52°05′23.35″N 004°08′09.96″W

Llyn Pencarreg is an oligotrophic lake that is Site of Special Scientific Interest in Carmarthen & Dinefwr, Wales.

== See also ==
- List of Sites of Special Scientific Interest in Carmarthen & Dinefwr
