= Beacon Bog =

Protected area in Carmarthenshire, Wales

- Site of Special Scientific Interest
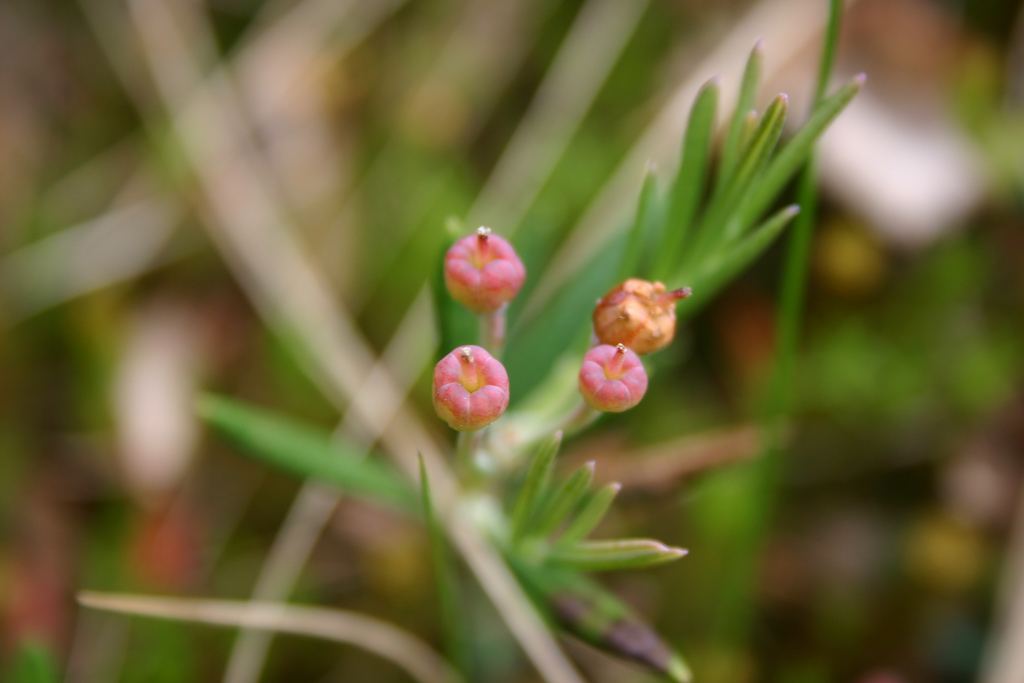
- Bog rosemary

- Location within Carmarthenshire
- Location of Beacon Bog.
- Area of search: Carmarthen & Dinefwr
- Grid reference: SN 354 167
- Coordinates: 51.8251°N 4.3891°W
- Interest: Biological
- Area: 11.5 hectares (28 acres)
- Notification date: 1973

Beacon Bog is a Site of Special Scientific Interest in the community of Llangynog in Carmarthenshire, Wales.

== Description ==
Beacon Bog is a small lowland raised bog with an area of 11.5 hectares (28 acres) with a peat depth of up to 2 metres (6.6 ft) in the centre, and is also host to several scarce plants. It lies 7 kilometres (4.3 mi) south-west of Carmarthen and is common land. The site was designated in 1973.

== Importance ==
The main feature of the site is the lowland raised bog, but the site also includes a number of other habitats. The diversity of habitats supports a wide range of flowers, mosses, ferns, insects and fungi.

== Habitats and species ==
In addition to the wet bog, the site includes scrub, semi-natural broad-leaved woodland, marshy grassland and standing water.

The wet surface of bog supports growth of bog mosses (Sphagnum spp.). Rare plants include the bog rosemary (Andromeda polifolia), royal fern (Osmunda regalis), and cranberry (Vaccinium oxycoccus). The petty whin (Genista anglica) grows on the drier western margin and purple moor-grass (Molinia caerulea) dominates the drier edges of the site. The rare weevil Bagous frit has been recorded at the site.

== Management ==
The management of a site of special scientific interest such as Beacon Bog requires control of operations that might affect the site, planning of changes to site to enhance it, and dealing with obstacles such as alien species which may damage the site.

=== Operations requiring consultation ===
A wide variety of operations may affect the site and require consultation with Natural Resources Wales and may also require consent, including activities relating to farming, using pesticides and fertilizers, changes that affect the water table, and the introduction or removal of flora and fauna. The list is not prohibitive, but many activities may be limited to certain areas or times of the year.

=== Planning ===
Natural Resources Wales would like the raised bog to occupy about 65% of the site and marshy grassland about 15%. Scrub and woodland would be restricted to 20%. Locally native trees, such as willow, of all ages would dominate the woodland, and dead wood can provide an environment for birds, invertebrates, and fungi. The site could also include the Bagous frit weevil and the black bog ant.

=== Obstacles ===
Water levels must be maintained to preserve the environment and drainage in nearby farmland may already have had an adverse effect. No new drainage should be installed and maintenance of existing drainage must be monitored. Scrub already encroaches the bog and should be monitored and cut and removed when needed. Rhododendron grows in the bog and is liable to displace native species. It should be removed by hand and the site needs to be checked regularly for new plants. Beacon Bog has been frequently burnt in the past but is now known to be detrimental to invertebrates and should be discontinued.

== See also ==
- List of Sites of Special Scientific Interest in Carmarthen & Dinefwr
