= Whitehill Down =

Protected area in Carmarthenshire, Wales

- Site of Special Scientific Interest
- Location within Wales
- Location of Whitehill Down.
- Area of search: Carmarthenshire
- Grid reference: SN2908013500
- Coordinates: 51.793965°N 4.4798604°W
- Interest: Biological
- Area: 46.29 ha (114.4 acres)
- Notification date: 18 September 1987

Whitehill Down is a Site of Special Scientific Interest in Carmarthen & Dinefwr, Wales.

== See also ==
- List of Sites of Special Scientific Interest in Carmarthen & Dinefwr
