= Cae Cilmaenllwyd =

Protected area in Carmarthenshire, Wales

Coordinates: 51.8664°N 3.9327°W

Cae Cilmaenllwyd is a Site of Special Scientific Interest in Carmarthenshire, Wales.

== See also ==
- List of Sites of Special Scientific Interest in Carmarthen & Dinefwr
