= Craig Ddu–Wharley Point Cliffs =

Protected area in Carmarthenshire, Wales

Craig Ddu–Wharley Point Cliffs are a set of red sandstone cliffs that are a Site of Special Scientific Interest in Carmarthen & Dinefwr, Wales.

== See also ==
- List of Sites of Special Scientific Interest in Carmarthen & Dinefwr
