= Cwar Glas Quarry and Sawdde Gorge =

Protected area in Carmarthenshire, Wales

Cwar Glas Quarry and Sawdde Gorge is a quarry that is an important source of geological stratigraphy and of fossils that is a Site of Special Scientific Interest in Carmarthen & Dinefwr, Wales.

== See also ==
- List of Sites of Special Scientific Interest in Carmarthen & Dinefwr
