= Pont y Fenni Quarry and Road Cutting =

Protected area in Carmarthenshire, Wales

Pont y Fenni Quarry and Road Cutting is an area that displays a wide array of fossils that is a Site of Special Scientific Interest in Carmarthen & Dinefwr, Wales.

== See also ==
- List of Sites of Special Scientific Interest in Carmarthen & Dinefwr
