= Pen-y-graig-goch =

Protected area in Carmarthenshire, Wales

- Site of Special Scientific Interest
- Location of Pen-y-graig-goch.
- Area of search: Carmarthenshire
- Area: 9 ha (22 acres)
- Notification date: 2010

Pen-y-graig-goch is a Site of Special Scientific Interest in Carmarthenshire, Wales.

== See also ==
- List of SSSIs in Carmarthenshire
