= Afon Twrch =

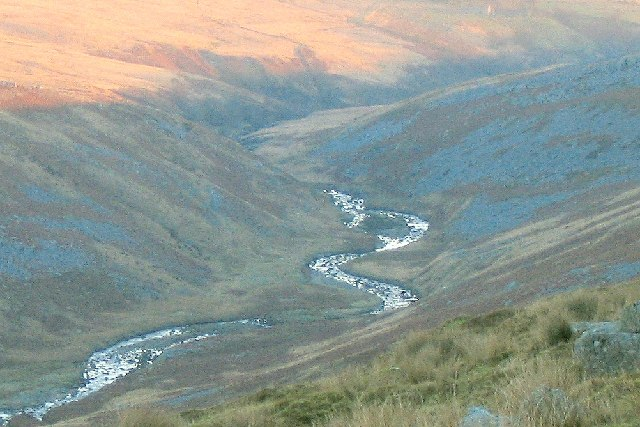
- Afon Twrch looking south downstream from the side of Pen yr Helyg
- Etymology: afon / 'river' and twrch / 'boar'.

Location
- Country: Wales

Physical characteristics
- Source
  - location: Southern slopes of Carmarthen Fans and Fan Brycheiniog
  - coordinates: 51.880359°N 3.710933°W
  - elevation: 770 metres (2,530 ft)
- Mouth
  - location: River Tawe at Ystalyfera
  - coordinates: 51.761194°N 3.782022°W
  - elevation: 70 metres (230 ft)
- Length: 8.7 miles (14 km)

Basin features
- River system: River Tawe
- Tributaries
  - left: Nant Gwys
  - right: Nant Lluestau, Nant Manyn, Nant Y Ddraenen, Twrch Fechan, Nant Y Llyn, Nant Llynfell

The Afon Twrch is a river which rises in the Black Mountain in south Wales. It forms the boundary between Powys and Carmarthenshire and, downstream of Ystradowen, between Powys and Neath Port Talbot.

== Name ==
The name derives from Welsh afon / 'river' and twrch / 'boar'. In common with other rivers sharing the same name, it is believed to refer to the burrowing or snouting action of the waters of the river. The river has also been associated with the legend of Twrch Trwyth.

== Geography ==
The headwaters arise on the southern slopes of Carmarthen Fans (Bannau Sir Gaer) and Fan Brycheiniog and are soon joined by the waters of the Twrch Fechan. The river flows south-west and then south and finally south-east for about 9 miles (14 km) to its confluence with the River Tawe at Ystalyfera. Tributaries include the Nant Gwys and the Nant Llynfell.

Settlements on the lower section of the river include Ystradowen, Cwm-twrch-uchaf, Cwm-twrch-isaf and Gurnos.

Parts of Cwm Twrch on its Carmarthenshire side are designated as an SSSI because they expose a good example of a boundary between strata.

== History ==
A colliery was established at Henllys Vale (OS grid ref SN762137) from which tramroads or waggonway ran down the valley to Cwm-twrch-isaf. A tall brick chimney is among the remains of several buildings associated with the former colliery. A bank of limekilns is also located at this spot, which can be reached by a walk along the line of the tramway running upstream from Brynhenllys Bridge (OS grid ref SN 756125).
