= Maesyprior =

Protected area in Carmarthenshire, Wales

- Site of Special Scientific Interest
- Location within Wales
- Location of Maesyprior.
- Area of search: Carmarthenshire
- Grid reference: SN3618819650
- Coordinates: 51.85134°N 4.3797985°W
- Interest: Geology
- Area: 43.99 ha (108.7 acres)
- Notification date: 22 July 1988

Maesyprior is a Site of Special Scientific Interest in Carmarthen & Dinefwr, Wales. A system of glacial meltwater channels preserved at this site contains important geological evidence concerning the nature of late Pleistocene geomorphological processes in west Wales.

== See also ==
- List of Sites of Special Scientific Interest in Carmarthen & Dinefwr
