= Smarts Quarry =

Protected area in Carmarthenshire, Wales

- Site of Special Scientific Interest
- Location within Carmarthenshire
- Location of Smarts Quarry.
- Area of search: Carmarthenshire
- Grid reference: SN424084
- Coordinates: 51.75269°N 4.26863°W
- Area: 2.6 hectares (0.02600 km^{2}; 0.01004 sq mi)
- Notification date: 1987

Smarts Quarry is a Site of Special Scientific Interest (SSSI) in Carmarthenshire, Wales, designated in 1987 for its geological features.

== SSSI ==
Smarts Quarry SSSI is located approximately 0.5 miles (0.80 km) east-north-east of Mynydd-y-Garreg, and covers 2.6 hectares (6.4 acres).

The SSSI citation for Smart Quarry specifies the importance of "abundant, bivalve produced, stellate feeding traces on a bedding surface" within the Namurian quartzite of the quarry. The citation finds such traces unique within the Namurian basal grits of South Wales and suggestive of an estuarine rather than a shoreline sedimentary deposition of the quarry stone.

== See also ==
- List of Sites of Special Scientific Interest in Carmarthenshire
