= Caeau Heol y Llidiart-coch =

Protected area in Carmarthenshire, Wales

Coordinates: 51.876°N 3.869°W

- Site of Special Scientific Interest
- Location of Caeau Heol y Llidiart-coch.
- Area of search: Carmarthenshire
- Area: 9 ha (22 acres)
- Notification date: 2010

Caeau Heol y Llidiart-coch is a Site of Special Scientific Interest in Carmarthenshire, Wales. The site is of special interest for its marshy grassland, fen meadow, and areas of species-rich grasslands. The site lies within Brecon Beacons National Park.

== See also ==
- List of SSSIs in Carmarthenshire
