= Cae Blaen-dyffryn =

Protected area in Carmarthenshire, Wales

Coordinates: 52.07910°N 4.03677°W

Cae Blaen-dyffryn is a Site of Special Scientific Interest (SSSI) in Carmarthenshire, Wales.

The SSSI is rectangular in shape, approximately 0.15 miles (0.24 km) by 0.09 miles (0.14 km) in size, and located some 2 miles (3.2 km) south-south-east of Cwmann. Its southern boundary abuts the A482 road.

== See also ==
- List of Sites of Special Scientific Interest in Carmarthen & Dinefwr
