= Cwm Twrch =

Protected area in Carmarthenshire, Wales

- Site of Special Scientific Interest
- Location within Carmarthenshire
- Location of Cwm Twrch.
- Area of search: Carmarthenshire
- Grid reference: SN424084
- Coordinates: 51.79933°N 3.80342°W
- Area: 2.4 hectares (0.02400 km^{2}; 0.009266 sq mi)
- Notification date: 1988

Cwm Twrch is a Site of Special Scientific Interest (SSSI) in Carmarthenshire, Wales.

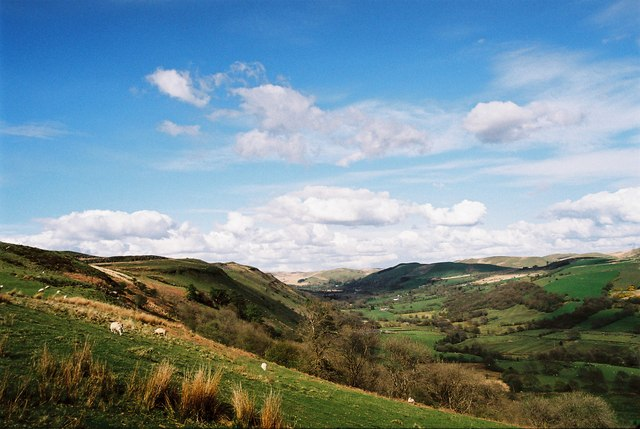

== SSSI ==
Cwm Twrch SSSI is located on and around the Afon Twrch approximately 0.9 miles (1.4 km) north-east of Ystradowen, and covers 2.4 hectares (5.9 acres).

The site is notable for its geology, where river erosion provides the best exposes the Amman Marine Band, a sedimentary layer showing a diverse fauna, which marks the Westphalian A – Westphalian B boundary in this Carboniferous rock strata.

== See also ==
- List of Sites of Special Scientific Interest in Carmarthenshire
