= Crûg Farm Quarry =

Protected area in Carmarthenshire, Wales

- Site of Special Scientific Interest
- Location within Carmarthenshire
- Location of Crûg Farm Quarry.
- Area of search: Carmarthenshire
- Grid reference: SN627231
- Coordinates: 51.88885°N 3.99558°W
- Area: 0.5 hectares (1.2 acres; 0.0050 km^{2})
- Notification date: 1980

Crûg Farm Quarry is a Site of Special Scientific Interest (SSSI) in Carmarthenshire, Wales, for the geological records preserved in its limestone.

== SSSI ==
Crûg Farm Quarry SSSI is located to the north of Llandeilo and covers 0.5 hectares (1.2 acres).

The SSSI citation for Crûg Farm Quarry identifies the geology of the site as having aspects unique in Britain. The shelly limestone rock is of the Upper Ordovician stratum, sufficiently rich in fossils of trilobites to be considered a reference site; and exhibiting also brachiopods, conodonts, and echinoderm fragments.

== See also ==
- List of Sites of Special Scientific Interest in Carmarthenshire
