= Meidrim Road Section =

Protected area in Carmarthenshire, Wales

Meidrim Road Section is a road cut that shows the geology of the Llanvirn-Caradoc age. It is a Site of Special Scientific Interest in Carmarthen & Dinefwr, Wales.

== See also ==
- List of Sites of Special Scientific Interest in Carmarthen & Dinefwr
