= Dan-Lan-Y-Castell Quarry =

Protected area in Carmarthenshire, Wales

Coordinates: 51.822941°N 4.374603°W

Dan-Lan-Y-Castell Quarry is a Site of Special Scientific Interest in Carmarthen & Dinefwr, Wales.

== See also ==
- List of Sites of Special Scientific Interest in Carmarthen & Dinefwr
