= Pen-Ty Pastures & Wood =

Protected area in Carmarthenshire, Wales

Pen-Ty Pastures & Wood are a pair of grasslands linked by woods that is a Site of Special Scientific Interest in Carmarthen & Dinefwr, Wales.

== See also ==
- List of Sites of Special Scientific Interest in Carmarthen & Dinefwr
