= Saundersfoot to Telpyn Coast =

Protected area in Carmarthenshire, Wales

Arfordir Saundersfoot - Telpyn/Saundersfoot - Telpyn Coast
- Site of Special Scientific Interest
- Area of search: Carmarthenshire
- Area: 152 ha (380 acres)
- Notification date: 1967

Saundersfoot to Telpyn Coast is a Site of Special Scientific Interest in Carmarthenshire, Wales.

== See also ==
- List of SSSIs in Carmarthenshire
