= Cae Maes-y-ffynnon =

Protected area in Carmarthenshire, Wales

- Site of Special Scientific Interest
- Location within Wales
- Location of Cae Maes-y-ffynnon.
- Area of search: Carmarthenshire
- Grid reference: SN7471623050
- Coordinates: 51.891879°N 3.8219958°W
- Interest: Biological
- Area: 1.79 ha (4.4 acres)
- Notification date: 30 March 1984

Cae Maes-y-ffynnon is a wet unimproved pasture that is a Site of Special Scientific Interest in Carmarthen & Dinefwr, Wales.

== See also ==
- List of Sites of Special Scientific Interest in Carmarthen & Dinefwr
