= Gwernydd Penbre =

Protected area in Carmarthenshire, Wales

- Site of Special Scientific Interest
- Location within Carmarthenshire
- Location of Gwernydd Penbre.
- Area of search: Carmarthenshire
- Grid reference: SN418028
- Coordinates: 51.70040°N 4.28780°W
- Area: 49.2 hectares (0.4920 km^{2}; 0.1900 sq mi)
- Notification date: 1999

Gwernydd Penbre is a Site of Special Scientific Interest (SSSI) in Carmarthenshire, Wales. It is also spelled by DEFRA and Natural Resources Wales as Gwernydd Pembre.

== SSSI ==
Gwernydd Penbre SSSI is located at the north-western extent of Pembrey and Burry Port Town, and covers 49.2 hectares (122 acres). Its western boundary abuts the A484 road between Kidwelly and Pembrey.

The site is composed of former grazing marshlands reclaimed from salt marshes in the 18th century and now reverted to waterlogged pasture. The site is notable, according to the SSSI citation, for its biological features which include "an extensive reedbed and associated communities, the presence of the rare marsh pea, (Lathyrus palustris), the fen land invertebrate community, and the presence of a strong breeding population of Cetti's warblers (Cettia cetti)". The reed bed is one of the largest in Carmarthenshire, and supports reed warbler (Acrocephalus scirpaceus), reed bunting (Emberiza schoeniculus) and water rail (Rallus aquaticus). Eurasian bittern (Botaurus stellaris) visit in winter.

19 hectares (47 acres) of the site belong to Wildlife Trust: West Wales and the Llanelli Naturalists Society.

== See also ==
- List of Sites of Special Scientific Interest in Carmarthenshire
