= Bryn Mawr-Skyway, Washington =

- Census-designated place
- Location of Bryn Mawr-Skyway, Washington
- Coordinates: 47°29′40″N 122°14′12″W
- Country: United States
- State: Washington
- County: King

Area
  - Total: 3.01 sq mi (7.80 km^{2})
  - Land: 2.84 sq mi (7.35 km^{2})
  - Water: 0.17 sq mi (0.45 km^{2})
- Elevation: 420 ft (130 m)

Population (2020)
  - Total: 17,397
  - Density: 6,130/sq mi (2,370/km^{2})
- Time zone: UTC-8 (Pacific (PST))
  - Summer (DST): UTC-7 (PDT)
- ZIP code: 98178
- FIPS code: 53-08552
- GNIS feature ID: 2407916

Bryn Mawr-Skyway (/brɪn ˈmɑːr/ brin MAR; from Welsh for 'big hill') is a census-designated place (CDP) in King County, Washington, United States. The population was 17,397 at the 2020 census.

Bryn Mawr-Skyway was the only CDP in the Seattle metropolitan area to have reported a majority-minority population in the 2000 census. Since that time, the area has grown even more diverse. As of the 2010 census, the demographic composition of the Skyway area is almost evenly distributed between White, Black or African American, and Asian community members.

== Geography ==
Skyway lies in an "unincorporated island" bordered to the north by the city of Seattle, to the west by Tukwila, and to the south and east by Renton. The neighborhood was mostly developed just after World War II as affordable housing for returning veterans. The area remains an affordable area close to the high employment areas of Renton and Seattle. The name "Skyway" may be derived from the area's siting on a high ridge in western Washington's hilly terrain, a name that echoes the Welsh "Bryn Mawr" (also the name used for a village and several other places), which means "big hill".

Skyway's main business districts lie along Renton Avenue South, with one center between 68th Avenue South and 74th Avenue South, including a small casino, bowling alley, and a grocery outlet, and another district between 75th Avenue South and 78th Avenue South, including a bank branch, the fire station, multiple churches, some auto shops, and the public library (a branch of the King County Library System). There is also a small business district centered at Martin Luther King Way South (State Route 900) around South 129th Street. Skyway Park, with baseball fields, a creek and wetlands, and picnic areas, is located near the center of Skyway.

The Bryn Mawr-Skyway CDP is made up of many neighborhoods, including Lakeridge, Campbell Hill and Earlington, in addition to the neighborhoods of Skyway and Bryn Mawr. The community is sometimes called "West Hill".

According to the United States Census Bureau, the CDP has a total area of 3.0 square miles (7.8 km^{2}), of which 2.9 square miles (7.4 km^{2}) are land and 0.2 square miles (0.4 km^{2}), or 5.73%, are water.

== Demographics ==
Historical population
Census	Pop.	Note	%±
1980	11,754		—
1990	12,514		6.5%
2000	13,977		11.7%
2010	15,645		11.9%
2020	17,397		11.2%
U.S. Decennial Census; 1970 1980 1990; 2000 2010

Bryn Mawr-Skyway first appeared as a census designated place in the 1980 U.S. census.

=== Racial and ethnic composition ===
Bryn Mawr-Skyway CDP, Washington – Racial and ethnic composition Note: the US Census treats Hispanic/Latino as an ethnic category. This table excludes Latinos from the racial categories and assigns them to a separate category. Hispanics/Latinos may be of any race.
Race / Ethnicity (NH = Non-Hispanic)	Pop 2000	Pop 2010	Pop 2020	% 2000	% 2010	% 2020
White alone (NH)	5,963	4,240	4,434	42.66%	27.10%	25.49%
Black or African American alone (NH)	3,501	4,797	4,720	25.05%	30.66%	27.13%
Native American or Alaska Native alone (NH)	104	96	124	0.74%	0.61%	0.71%
Asian alone (NH)	3,026	4,176	4,890	21.65%	26.69%	28.11%
Native Hawaiian or Pacific Islander alone (NH)	71	122	152	0.51%	0.78%	0.87%
Other race alone (NH)	36	46	94	0.26%	0.29%	0.54%
Mixed race or Multiracial (NH)	641	960	1,268	4.59%	6.14%	7.29%
Hispanic or Latino (any race)	635	1,208	1,715	4.54%	7.72%	9.86%
Total	13,977	15,645	17,397	100.00%	100.00%	100.00%

=== 2020 census ===
As of the 2020 census, Bryn Mawr-Skyway had a population of 17,397. The median age was 38.4 years. 21.4% of residents were under the age of 18 and 15.2% of residents were 65 years of age or older. For every 100 females there were 101.0 males, and for every 100 females age 18 and over there were 99.3 males age 18 and over.

100.0% of residents lived in urban areas, while 0.0% lived in rural areas.

There were 6,335 households in Bryn Mawr-Skyway, of which 30.8% had children under the age of 18 living in them. Of all households, 41.9% were married-couple households, 21.6% were households with a male householder and no spouse or partner present, and 29.0% were households with a female householder and no spouse or partner present. About 25.7% of all households were made up of individuals and 9.6% had someone living alone who was 65 years of age or older.

There were 6,638 housing units, of which 4.6% were vacant. The homeowner vacancy rate was 1.4% and the rental vacancy rate was 3.7%.

Racial composition as of the 2020 census
Race	Number	Percent
White	4,645	26.7%
Black or African American	4,790	27.5%
American Indian and Alaska Native	216	1.2%
Asian	4,932	28.3%
Native Hawaiian and Other Pacific Islander	153	0.9%
Some other race	887	5.1%
Two or more races	1,774	10.2%

=== 2010 Census ===
As of the census of 2010, there were 15,645 people, 5,772 households, and 3,742 families living in the greater Skyway area. The population density was 4,935.3 people per square mile (1,905.5/km^{2}). There were 6,189 housing units at an average density of 1,952.4/sq mi (753.8/km^{2}). The racial makeup of the area was 29.6% White, 31.4% Black or African American, 0.8% Native American, 27.1% Asian, 0.8% Pacific Islander, 2.9% from other races, and 7.2% from two or more races. Hispanic or Latino of any race were 7.7% of the population.

=== 2000 Census ===
As of the census of 2000, there were 13,977 people, 5,574 households, and 3,578 families living in the greater Skyway area. The population density was 4,408.1 people per square mile (1,702.4/km^{2}). There were 5,785 housing units at an average density of 1,824.5/sq mi (704.6/km^{2}). The racial makeup of the area was 44.24% White, 25.33% African American, 0.81% Native American, 21.82% Asian, 0.51% Pacific Islander, 2.19% from other races, and 5.10% from two or more races. Hispanic or Latino of any race were 4.54% of the population.

There were 5,574 households recorded in 2000, out of which 28.2% had children under the age of 18 living with them, 45.6% were married couples living together, 13.7% had a female householder with no husband present, and 35.8% were non-families. 27.9% of all households were made up of individuals, and 9.3% had someone living alone who was 65 years of age or older. The average household size was 2.50 and the average family size was 3.08.

In the area, the age categories recorded in 2000 were 22.8% under the age of 18, 7.9% from 18 to 24, 31.0% from 25 to 44, 24.4% from 45 to 64, and 13.9% who were 65 years of age or older. The median age was 38 years. For every 100 females there were 97.6 males. For every 100 females age 18 and over, there were 95.3 males.

The median income for a household in the greater Skyway area in 2000 was $47,385, and the median income for a family was $55,927. Males had a median income of $38,821 versus $31,443 for females. The per capita income in Skyway was $23,294. About 6.4% of families and 7.7% of the population were below the poverty line, including 9.3% of those under age 18 and 6.4% of those age 65 or over.

== Politics ==
Like most inner suburbs of Seattle, Bryn Mawr-Skyway is dominated by the Democratic Party in national elections. In 2004, Democrat John Kerry received over 70 percent of the vote, and Republican George W. Bush received just over 25 percent.

== Neighborhoods ==
The Skyway/West Hill community is made up of nine neighborhoods:

- Black River
- Bryn Mawr
- Campbell Hill
- Earlington (also extends into the City of Renton)
- Hill Top
- Lakeridge (also extends into the City of Seattle's Rainier Beach neighborhood)
- Panorama View
- Skycrest
- Skyway (neighborhood)

== Points of interest ==
- Bryn Mawr Park
- Lakeridge Park/Deadhorse Canyon
- Skyway Park
- Black Panther Park

== Education ==
=== School districts ===
- Renton School District
  - Secondary Learning Center, now known as Albert Talley Sr. High School
  - Dimmitt Middle School
  - Bryn Mawr Elementary School
  - Campbell Hill Elementary School
  - Lakeridge Elementary School
