= Ydw Valley and Fron Road Geological Exposures =

Protected area in Carmarthenshire, Wales

Ydw Valley and Fron Road Geological Exposures are four separate areas displaying lower Silurian geology. They are a Site of Special Scientific Interest in Carmarthen & Dinefwr, Wales.

== See also ==
- List of Sites of Special Scientific Interest in Carmarthen & Dinefwr
