= Ynys Uchaf =

Protected area in Carmarthenshire, Wales

- Site of Special Scientific Interest
- Location within Wales
- Location of Ynys Uchaf.
- Area of search: Carmarthenshire
- Grid reference: SN4887214850
- Coordinates: 51.811796°N 4.1936935°W
- Interest: Biological
- Area: 15.82 ha (39.1 acres)
- Notification date: 24 July 1987

Ynys Uchaf is a section of floodplain of the River Gwendraeth that is a Site of Special Scientific Interest in Carmarthen & Dinefwr, Wales.

== See also ==
- List of Sites of Special Scientific Interest in Carmarthen & Dinefwr
