= Birdshill Quarry =

Protected area in Carmarthenshire, Wales

- Site of Special Scientific Interest
- Location within Carmarthenshire
- Location of Birdshill Quarry.
- Area of search: Carmarthenshire
- Grid reference: SN601321
- Coordinates: 51.88865°N 4.03285°W
- Area: 0.4 hectares (0.004000 km^{2}; 0.001544 sq mi)
- Notification date: 1984

Birdshill Quarry is a Site of Special Scientific Interest (SSSI) in Carmarthenshire, Wales.

== SSSI ==
Birdshill Quarry SSSI is located approximately 1.8 miles (2.9 km) west of Llandeilo, and covers 0.4 hectares (0.99 acres).

The SSSI citation for Birshill Quarry specifies the importance of the site to be the abundant fossils of trilobites, brachiopods and bivalves in an Ashgill Birdshill Limestone strata of the quarry, incorporated as deposits some 425 million years ago. The site has been dated by reference to microfossil conodonts found in the strata.

== See also ==
- List of Sites of Special Scientific Interest in Carmarthenshire
