= Rhosydd Llanpumsaint =

Protected area in Carmarthenshire, Wales

- Site of Special Scientific Interest
- Location within Carmarthenshire
- Location of Rhosydd Llanpumsaint.
- Area of search: Carmarthenshire
- Grid reference: SN423276
- Coordinates: 51.92406°N 4.29494°W
- Area: 39.4 hectares (0.3940 km^{2}; 0.1521 sq mi)
- Notification date: 12 February 2010

Rhosydd Llanpumsaint is a Site of Special Scientific Interest (SSSI) in Carmarthenshire, Wales.

== SSSI ==
Rhosydd Llanpumsaint SSSI is located approximately 1.33 miles (2.14 km) west-south-west of Pontarsais and 1.33 miles (2.14 km) north-west of Rhydargaeau. The site covers 39.4 hectares (97 acres).

The Rhosydd Llanpumsaint site is notable for geomorphological features which in turn support special biological features. The site - field and peatland - has on its west side numerous oval depressions of up to 70 metres (230 ft) diameter thought to have been formed by mineral pillars under permafrost ice which have collapsed on the retreat of the ice, to leave an undulating surface the depressions of which have become sediment and peat filled. The site is one of the best examples of ramparted ground-ice depression features in Wales. The depressions, in turn, provide a mire habitat for a variety of plants such as red bog moss (Sphagnum capillifolium), hare's-tail cotton-grass (Eriophorum vaginatum), cross-leaved heath (Erica tetralix) and heather (Calluna vulgaris). The mix of plants in any depression varies according to conditions in and water supply for the depression, and the site hosts a wide and diverse set of species including the only known colony of the liverwort (Pallavicinia lyellii) in Carmarthenshire.

== See also ==
- List of Sites of Special Scientific Interest in Carmarthenshire
