= Cae Cwm-tywyll =

Protected area in Carmarthenshire, Wales

- Site of Special Scientific Interest
- Location within Wales
- Location of Cae Cwm-tywyll.
- Area of search: Carmarthen
- Grid reference: SN4812023870
- Coordinates: 51.89263°N 4.2085591°W
- Interest: Biological
- Area: 1.65 ha (4.1 acres)
- Notification date: 12 June 1984

Cae Cwm-tywyll is an unimproved hay meadow that is a Site of Special Scientific Interest in Carmarthenshire, Wales.

== See also ==
- List of Sites of Special Scientific Interest in Carmarthen & Dinefwr
