= Crychan Forest Tracks =

Protected area in Carmarthenshire, Wales

Coordinates: 52.0379°N 3.6871°W

Crychan Forest Tracks is a Site of Special Scientific Interest in Carmarthen & Dinefwr, Wales. It was chosen as a special stage in the British Rally from 2006 to 2008.

== See also ==
- List of Sites of Special Scientific Interest in Carmarthen & Dinefwr
