= Coedydd Capel Dyddgen =

Protected area in Carmarthenshire, Wales

- Site of Special Scientific Interest
- Location within Wales
- Location of Coedydd Capel Dyddgen.
- Area of search: Carmarthen
- Grid reference: SN4690012715
- Coordinates: 51.792077°N 4.2213332°W
- Interest: Biological
- Area: 24.63 ha (60.9 acres)
- Notification date: 27 September 1999

Coedydd Capel Dyddgen is a Site of Special Scientific Interest in Carmarthen & Dinefwr, Wales.

Coedydd Capel Dyddgen is a mosaic of Ash-Hazel woodland, scrub and grassland. The site is important for bats, particularly Rhinolophus ferrumequinum (Greater Horseshoe bat) that use the large cave Ogof Capel Dyddgen and the adjoining woodland and pasture provide important feeding areas. Muscardinus avellanarius (Common dormouse) and several noteworthy invertebrates also inhabit the site.

== See also ==
- List of Sites of Special Scientific Interest in Carmarthen & Dinefwr
