= Caeau Afon Gwili =

Protected area in Carmarthenshire, Wales

- Site of Special Scientific Interest
- Location of Caeau Afon Gwili.
- Area of search: Carmarthenshire
- Area: 18 ha (44 acres)
- Notification date: 1993

Caeau Afon Gwili is a Site of Special Scientific Interest in Carmarthen, Wales. It is an area of land protected under The Wildlife and Countryside Act of 1981 because it contains wildlife or geographical features or landforms of special importance. The name Caeau Afon Gwili means Gwili River Fields.

== See also ==
- List of SSSIs in Carmarthenshire
