= Coedydd y Garn =

Protected area in Carmarthenshire, Wales

- Site of Special Scientific Interest
- Location within Wales
- Location of Coedydd y Garn.
- Area of search: Carmarthenshire
- Grid reference: SN5085414435
- Coordinates: 51.8086°N 4.1647858°W
- Interest: Biological
- Area: 22.98 ha (56.8 acres)
- Notification date: 22 July 1988

Coedydd y Garn is an outcrop of limestone that is a Site of Special Scientific Interest in Carmarthen & Dinefwr, Wales.

== See also ==
- List of Sites of Special Scientific Interest in Carmarthen & Dinefwr
