= Tregyb Woodlands =

Protected area in Carmarthenshire, Wales

- Site of Special Scientific Interest
- Location within Wales
- Location of Tregyb Woodlands.
- Area of search: Carmarthenshire
- Grid reference: SN641217
- Coordinates: 51.877661°N 3.974768°W
- Area: 26.56 hectares (0.2656 km^{2})
- Notification date: 01 Ionawr 1980

Tregyb Woodlands (Welsh: Coedydd Tregyb) is a Site of Special Scientific Interest (SSSI) in Carmarthen & Dinefwr, Wales. Designated as a SSSI since 1980 as a conservation effort to protect and conserve the site, its area is 27 hectares.

The woodland lies around 1 mile (1.6 km) to the west of the town of Llandeilo, and are within the Brecon Beacons National Park. Three woods make up the SSSI; Cae'r Coed, Big Grove and Warren Tregyb. The SSSI was first notified on 1 January 1980, under the powers of the National Parks and Access to the Countryside Act 1949. Following the passing of the Wildlife and Countryside Act 1981, the site was renotified on 23 March 1983 to bring it under the provisions of the new Act.

The woodlands are managed by the Woodland Trust, who also manage adjacent woodland outside of the designated SSSI area, creating a total wood 42 hectares in area.
