= Allt Penycoed Stream Section =

Protected area in Carmarthenshire, Wales

- Site of Special Scientific Interest
- Location within Wales
- Location of Allt Penycoed Stream Section.
- Area of search: Carmarthen & Dinefwr
- Grid reference: SN4435918141
- Coordinates: 51.840123°N 4.2605862°W
- Interest: Geological
- Area: 1.62 ha (4.0 acres)
- Notification date: 1985

Allt Penycoed Stream Section is a Site of Special Scientific Interest (or SSSI) in Carmarthenshire, Wales. It is protected by law and has been designated as an SSSI since April 1985 in an attempt to protect rare or unique features or species within it. The site has an area of 1.62 hectares and is managed by Natural Resources Wales.

This site is designated due to its geological qualities. In Wales, geological sites range from quarries to rocky outcrops and massive sea-cliffs. 30% of SSSIs in Wales are notified for geological and geomorphological features.

This stream section provides valuable information of dense turbidite/shale sequence, demonstrating the base of the member and good sections in the underlying Pibwr mudstones, which shows trilobite faunas representative of major ecological changes related to water depth and oxygenation around 500 million years ago. Trilobites are the fossilized remains of a new extinct group of sea-living arthropods, which have been recorded from this site and helped geologists understand conditions of the sea bed during the accumulation of sediment. The rich fossil assemblage has also enabled geologists to compare this section with rocks of a similar age all through South wales and the rest of the British Isles.

== See also ==
- National nature reserves in Wales
- List of Ramsar sites in Wales
