= Caeau Pen-y-coed =

Protected area in Clwyd, Wales

- Site of Special Scientific Interest
- Location within Wales
- Location of Caeau Pen-y-coed.
- Area of search: Clwyd
- Grid reference: SJ2234541748
- Coordinates: 52.967446°N 3.1576892°W
- Interest: Biological
- Area: 10.94 ha (27.0 acres)
- Notification date: 18 November 1999

Caeau Pen-y-coed is a Site of Special Scientific Interest in the preserved county of Clwyd, north Wales.

== See also ==
- List of Sites of Special Scientific Interest in Clwyd
