= Heronry =

Breeding ground for herons

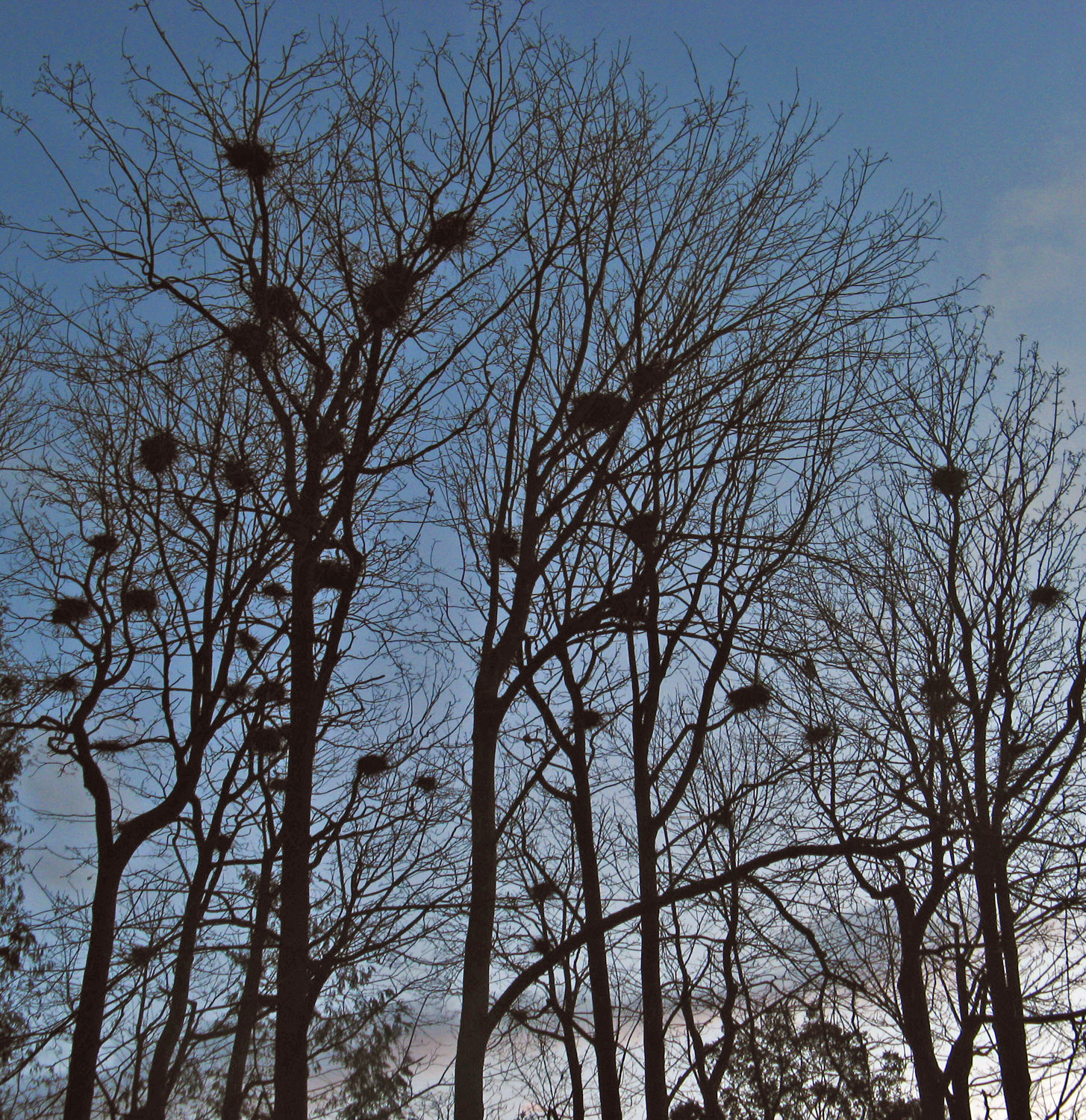
Heronry in Stanley Park, Vancouver, British Columbia, Canada

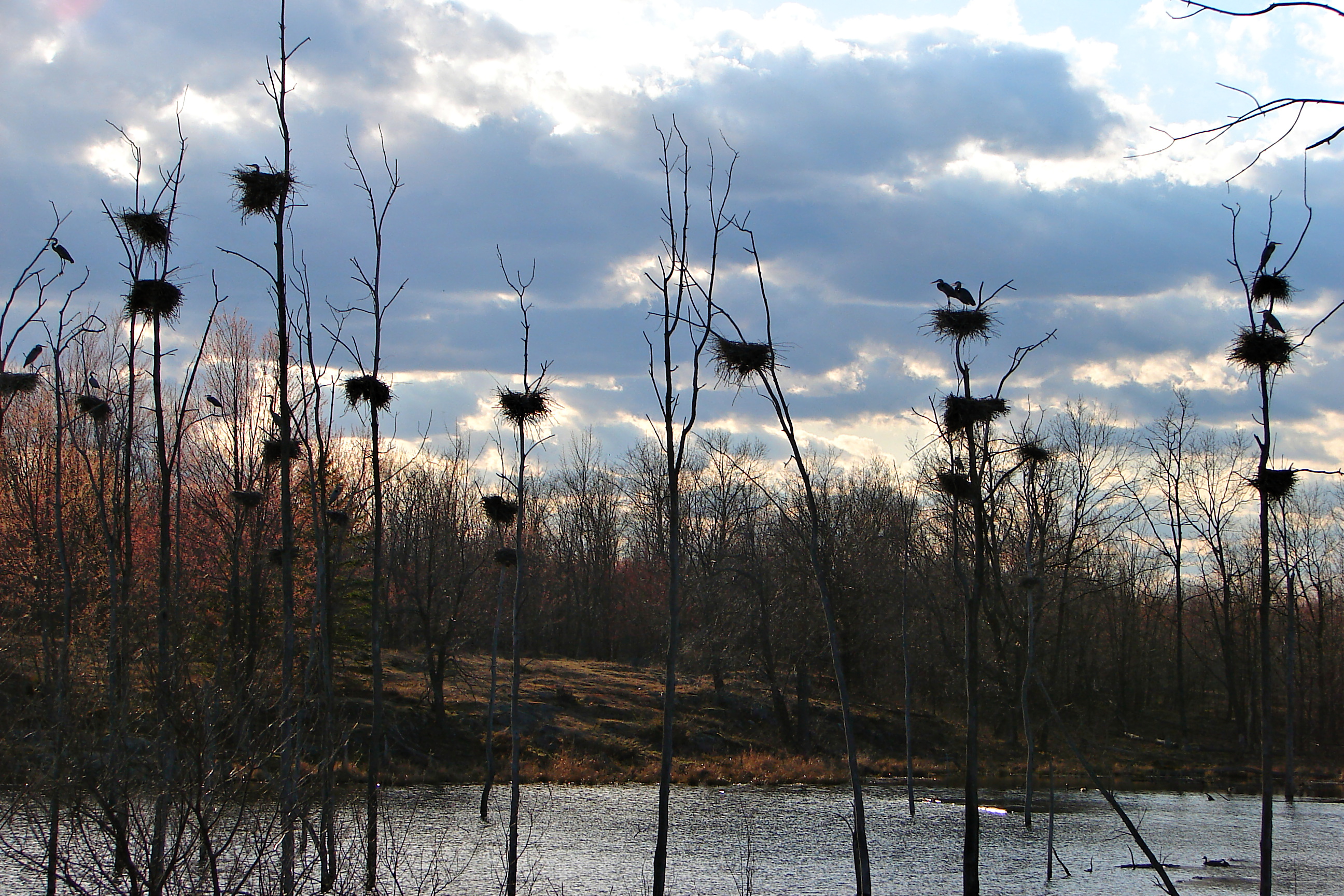
Heronry at Carp Hills, Ottawa, Canada

A heronry, sometimes called a heron rookery, is a breeding ground for herons.

== Notable heronries ==
Although their breeding territories are often on more protected small islands in lakes or retention ponds, herons breed in heronries (or also called rookeries, especially since other birds join them like spoonbills, storks, and cormorants). Some of the notable heronries are:

=== Asia ===
- Kaggaladu Heronry is in Karnataka state of India. This heronry, in the Tumkur district of Karnataka, was first made known to the outside world in 1999 by members of the Tumkur-based NGO Wildlife Aware Nature Club.

=== Europe ===
- Cleeve Heronry (grid reference ST463662), in a woodland near the village of Cleeve in North Somerset, UK.
- Hilgay Heronry (grid reference TL635992) is in Norfolk. It is situated in a small copse on the edge of The Fens in the UK. An average of c. 40 pairs of grey heron nests each year at this site, in ash (Fraxinus excelsior) and European larch (Larix decidua) trees.

=== North America ===
- The Florida Everglades in south Florida, United States. Thousands of birds, including herons, egrets, spoonbills, and storks, nest in mangroves (genus Rhizophora).
- Stanley Park in British Columbia, Canada, is a heronry for great blue herons, and has been documented since at least 1921. Depending on the year, over 100 nests may be present during the breeding season.

== See also ==
- Bird colony
