= Meadow thistle =

Meadow thistle is a common name for several thistles and may refer to:

- Cirsium dissectum, native to Europe
- Cirsium scariosum, native to North America
