= Caeau Blaen-yr-Orfa =

Protected area in Carmarthenshire, Wales

Caeau Blaen-yr-orfa
- Site of Special Scientific Interest
- Location within Wales
- Location of Caeau Blaen-yr-orfa.
- Area of search: Wales
- Grid reference: SN5749114267
- Coordinates: 51.808823°N 4.0685154°W
- Interest: Biological
- Area: 3.41 ha (8.4 acres)
- Notification date: 22 July 1988

Caeau Blaen-yr-Orfa is an unimproved grassland that is a Site of Special Scientific Interest in Carmarthen & Dinefwr, Wales.

== See also ==
- List of Sites of Special Scientific Interest in Carmarthen & Dinefwr
