= Caeau Nant Garenig =

Protected area in Carmarthenshire, Wales

- Site of Special Scientific Interest
- Location within Wales
- Location of Caeau Nant Garenig.
- Area of search: Carmarthenshire
- Grid reference: SN6728812507
- Coordinates: 51.795421°N 3.9258242°W
- Interest: Biological
- Area: 12.21 ha (30.2 acres)
- Notification date: 15 May 1990

Caeau Nant Garenig is collection of unimproved pastures that is a Site of Special Scientific Interest in Carmarthen & Dinefwr, Wales.

== See also ==
- List of Sites of Special Scientific Interest in Carmarthen & Dinefwr
