= Caeau Nantsais =

Protected area in Carmarthenshire, Wales

- Site of Special Scientific Interest
- Location within Wales
- Location of Caeau Nantsais.
- Area of search: Carmarthenshire
- Grid reference: SN3469033578
- Coordinates: 51.976012°N 4.4082156°W
- Interest: Biological
- Area: 0.93 ha (2.3 acres)
- Notification date: 21 September 2000

Caeau Nantsais are two fields next to a that are a Site of Special Scientific Interest in Carmarthen & Dinefwr, Wales.

== See also ==
- List of Sites of Special Scientific Interest in Carmarthen & Dinefwr
