= Mawr (surname) =

Mawr means big or great in Welsh. Notable people with the surname include:

- Beli Mawr, an ancestor figure in medieval Welsh literature and genealogies
- Tewdwr Mawr, 6th century king in Brittany and Cornwall

== See also ==
- Marr (surname)
