= Caeau Capel Hendre =

Protected area in Carmarthenshire, Wales

- Site of Special Scientific Interest
- Location within Wales
- Location of Caeau Capel Hendre.
- Area of search: Carmarthenshire
- Grid reference: SN5919311791
- Coordinates: 51.787007°N 4.0428386°W
- Interest: Biological
- Area: 1.67 ha (4.1 acres)
- Notification date: 26 May 1988

Caeau Capel Hendre is a Site of Special Scientific Interest in Carmarthen & Dinefwr, Wales.

== See also ==
- List of Sites of Special Scientific Interest in Carmarthen & Dinefwr
