= Coed Llandyfan =

Protected area in Carmarthenshire, Wales

Coordinates: 51.834°N 3.974°W

Coed Llandyfan is a Site of Special Scientific Interest in Carmarthen & Dinefwr, Wales. It is an ancient semi-natural broadleaved wood near the small village of Llandyfan, and is 6.7 hectares (17 acres) in extent.

== See also ==
- List of Sites of Special Scientific Interest in Carmarthen & Dinefwr
