= Allt y wern =

Protected area in Carmarthenshire, Wales

Allt y Wern
- Site of Special Scientific Interest
- Location within Carmarthenshire
- Location of Allt y Wern.
- Area of search: Carmarthen & Dinefwr
- Grid reference: SN 579 216
- Coordinates: 51.8753°N 4.06489°W
- Interest: Biological
- Area: 6 hectares (15 acres)
- Notification date: 1973

Allt y Wern is a Site of Special Scientific Interest (SSSI) in the community of Llangathen in Carmarthenshire, Wales. The site is a semi-natural broadleaved woodland with an area of 6 hectares (15 acres).

== Site ==
Allt y Wern lies to the south-west of the village of Llangathen and is near the River Tywi. The site was designated in 1973 and comprises 6 hectares (15 acres) of woodland of oak (Quercus robur) many of which are at least 200 years old, ash (Fraxinus excelsior) and hazel (Corylus avellana), with species-rich shrub and ground layers. The site also includes streams and wet flush areas (an area of soil where nutrients accumulate due to the inflow of water).

== Importance ==
Allt y Wern's main feature is the semi-natural broadleaved woodland, but the diversity of habitats make the site important for red kites (Milvus milvus), thin-spiked wood-sedge (Carex strigosa), and mosses and lichens.. The site was managed by coppice-with-standards but the practice lapsed around 1950. Coppice-with-standards is a coppicing method where older trees that have not been coppiced before are felled, opening the tree canopy for new trees, which was an unusual practice in this part of Wales.

== Management ==
A wide variety of operations may affect the site and require consultation with Natural Resources Wales and may also require consent. 16 operations are currently listed and include activities relating to farming, and the introduction or removal of flora and fauna. The list is not prohibitive, but many activities may be limited to certain areas or times of the year.

Natural Resources Wales aim to restore coppicing with standards to promote more diversity in the understorey (the tree and shrub layer below the canopy) and ground layer. Leaving more dead wood will encourage invertebrates, fungi, and birds. The diversity of habits will encourage red kites to breed on the site each spring.

Excessive grazing by domestic animals and deer reduces the natural regeneration of the wood and fencing should be improved. Alien tree species such as sycamore and beech are present, in small numbers, but they generate excessive shade and persistent leaf litter. Grey squirrels are present and damage young trees.

== See also ==
- List of Sites of Special Scientific Interest in Carmarthenshire
