= Broad Oak and Thornhill Meadows =

Protected area in Carmarthenshire, Wales

Coordinates: 51.79°N 4.06°W

Broad Oak and Thornhill Meadows is a Site of Special Scientific Interest near the village of Cross Hands in Carmarthenshire, Wales.

The site comprises grassland, formerly used as pasture for horses and cattle. It is a stronghold of the marsh fritillary butterfly.

== See also ==
- List of Sites of Special Scientific Interest in Carmarthen & Dinefwr
