= Caeau Ty'n-llwyni =

Protected area in Powys, Wales

- Site of Special Scientific Interest
- Location within Wales
- Location of Caeau Ty'n-llwyni.
- Area of search: Wales
- Grid reference: SN9016044016
- Coordinates: 52.083565°N 3.6043913°W
- Interest: Biological
- Area: 7.97 ha (19.7 acres)
- Notification date: 3 November 1982

Caeau Ty'n-llwyni is a Site of Special Scientific Interest in Brecknock, Powys, Wales.

== See also ==
- List of Sites of Special Scientific Interest in Brecknock
