= Aber Taf =

Protected area in Carmarthenshire, Wales

- Site of Special Scientific Interest
- Location within Carmarthenshire
- Location of Aber Taf.
- Area of search: Carmarthenshire
- Grid reference: SN310110
- Coordinates: 51.72846°N 4.40403°W
- Area: 1,494.3 hectares (15 km^{2}; 5.8 sq mi)
- Notification date: 2002

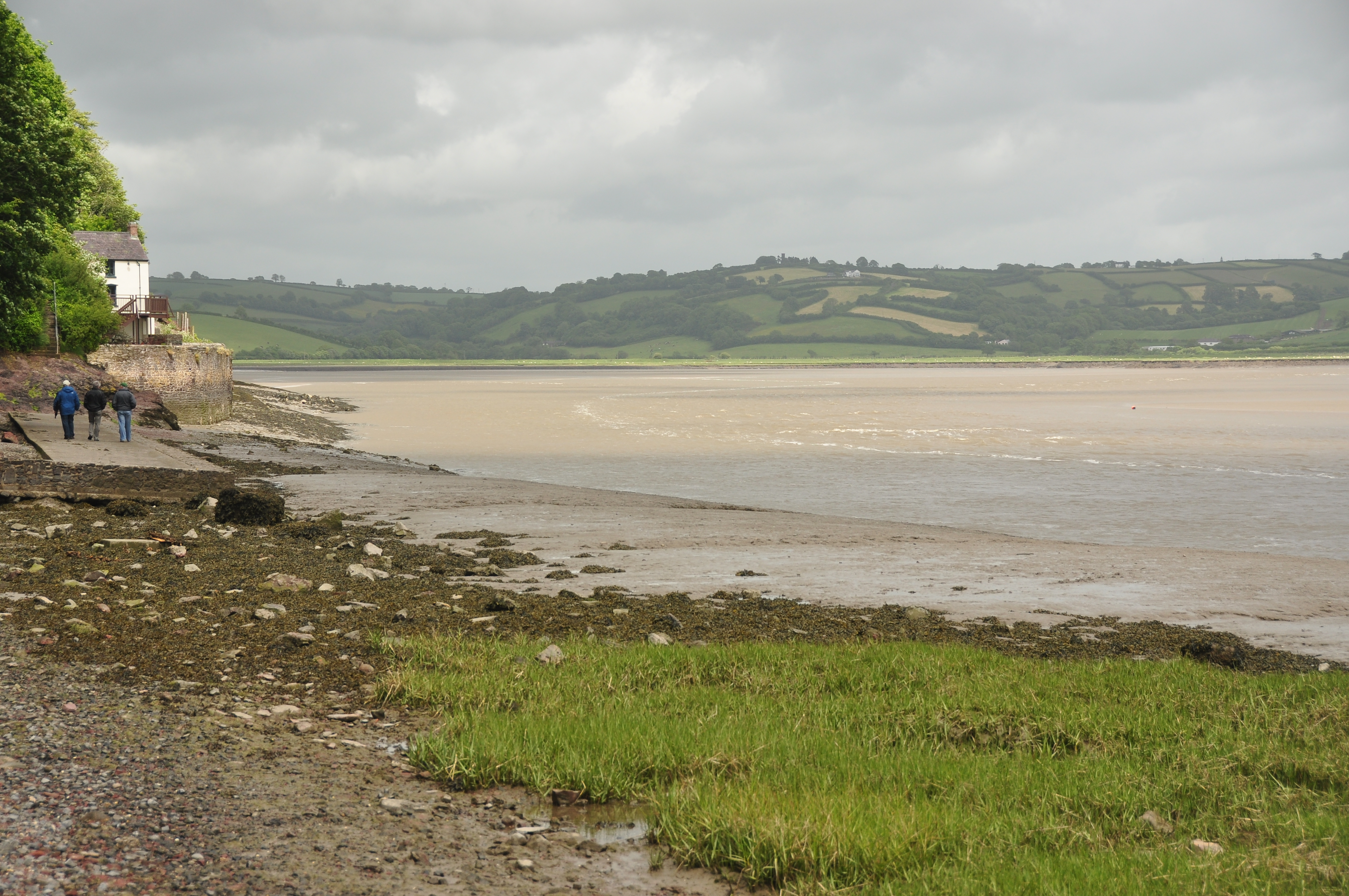

Aber Taf (Welsh for 'Taf Estuary') is a large Site of Special Scientific Interest (SSSI) in Carmarthenshire, Wales, and forms part of the Carmarthen Bay and Estuaries Special Area of Conservation.

== SSSI ==
Aber Taf is located in the central northern section of Carmarthen Bay in the south-west of Wales. The estuary forms the mouth of three rivers - the Taf, Tywi and Gwendraeth. The SSSI covers the tidal rivermouths of each of these; on the Tywi, north as far as the south of Carmarthen, where it meets the Afon Tywi SSSI; on the Taf, to a point just north of the A477 road and on the Gwendraeth as far east as the A484 road. The site extends across the saltflats of Carmarthen Bay, including Ginst Point, Cefn Sidan Sands, Laughame Sands, East Marsh and Pendine Sands, and covers approximately 1,494.3 hectares (3,692 acres).

Aber Taf is listed as an SSSI for its saltmarsh vegetation, and for two sorts of migratory fish, allis shad (Alosa alosa) and twaite shad (Alosa fallax), as well as for the wider marine and intertidal habitats of the area which support wintering wildfowl. The site has a number of graduated zones of saltmarsh, their composition and species dependent on the amount of tidal inundation and grazing. Fine muds predominate in the upper reaches of the three river estuaries; muddy sands are found in the midsections, and clean sand in the mouth of the estuary.

The seaward fringe of the site is dominated by common cord-grass (Spartina anglica), with patches of common saltmarsh-grass (Puccinellia maritima), common glasswort (Salicornia europaea), sea aster (Aster tripolium) and annual sea-blite (Suaeda maritima). Mid and upper marsh communities are composed of sea aster, common saltmarsh-grass, sea rush (Juncus maritimus) and red fescue (Festuca rubra) together with sea plantain (Plantago maritima), sea arrowgrass (Triglochin maritimum), sea-milkwort (Glaux maritima) and English scurvygrass (Cochlearia anglica). Less grazed areas, such as Laugharne and Ginst Point have stands of sea-purslane (Atriplex portulacoides). Swampy areas have sea club-rush (Bolboschoenus maritimus) or the common reed (Phragmites australis).

The site is notable for occurrences of two other rare plant species, the rock sea-lavender (Limonium procerum ssp. procerum) and bulbous foxtail (Alopecurus bulbosus).

== See also ==
- List of Sites of Special Scientific Interest in Carmarthenshire
