= Caeau Rhyd-y-gwiail =

Protected area in Carmarthenshire, Wales

- Site of Special Scientific Interest
- Location within Wales
- Location of Caeau Rhyd-y-gwiail.
- Area of search: Carmarthenshire
- Grid reference: SN5637114854
- Coordinates: 51.81381°N 4.0849931°W
- Interest: Biological
- Area: 6.95 ha (17.2 acres)
- Notification date: 22 September 1999

Caeau Rhyd-y-gwiail is an area of grassland that is a Site of Special Scientific Interest in Carmarthen & Dinefwr, Wales.

== See also ==
- List of Sites of Special Scientific Interest in Carmarthen & Dinefwr
