= Caeau Cnwch a Ty'n-y-graig =

Protected area in Powys, Wales

- Site of Special Scientific Interest
- Location within Wales
- Location of Caeau Cnwch a Ty'n-y-graig.
- Area of search: Wales
- Grid reference: SN9334863657
- Coordinates: 52.260705°N 3.5640658°W
- Interest: Biological
- Area: 5.48 ha (13.5 acres)
- Notification date: 1 January 1965

Caeau Cnwch a Ty'n-y-graig is a Site of Special Scientific Interest in Brecknock, Powys, Wales. It occupies sloping ground on the south west side of Pen-y-garreg Reservoir in the Elan Valley.

Caeau Cnwch a Ty'n-y-graig comprises four traditionally managed fields in a small valley below Craig Cnwch, near Elan Village. They provide a type of herb-rich grassland that is characteristic of the upland fringe of central Wales.

== See also ==
- List of Sites of Special Scientific Interest in Brecknock
