= Mynydd Mawr (disambiguation) =

Mynydd Mawr (Welsh for big mountain) is a mountain in North Wales.

Mynydd Mawr may also refer to:

- Llanarmon Mynydd Mawr, an isolated rural parish in Powys, Wales
- Llanelli and Mynydd Mawr Railway, a heritage railway aiming to re-instate the Llanelly and Mynydd Mawr Railway that closed in 1989
- Llanelly and Mynydd Mawr Railway
- Ras Mynydd Mawr, an annual running race from Y Fron up the hill Mynydd Mawr
- Mynydd Mawr, a 160 metre hill near Aberdaron
