= Afon Marlas =

River in Carmarthenshire, Wales

Coordinates: 51.8011°N 3.9986°W

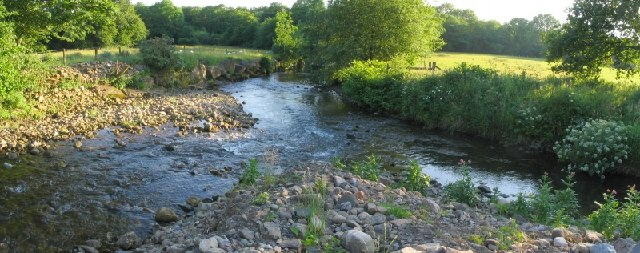
Confluence of Rivers Loughor (left) and Morlas (right)

The Afon Marlas is a right-bank tributary of the River Loughor in eastern Carmarthenshire, West Wales. It rises north of the village of Llandybie and flows southwards through that village and joins the Loughor on the northwestern edge of Ammanford near Aberlash Mill.
