= Bryn Mawr =

Bryn Mawr may refer to:

== Settlements ==
- Brynmawr, a market town in Blaenau Gwent, Wales

=== United States ===
- Bryn Mawr, California
- Bryn Mawr Historic District, Edgewater, Chicago, Illinois
- Bryn Mawr, Minneapolis, Minnesota
- Bryn Mawr, Pennsylvania
- Bryn Mawr-Skyway, Washington

== Schools ==
- Bryn Mawr College, Bryn Mawr, Pennsylvania, U.S.
- Bryn Mawr School, Baltimore, Maryland, U.S.
- Bryn Mawr Elementary School, Chicago, U.S.

== Train stations ==
- Brynmawr railway station, Wales
- Bryn Mawr station (CTA), a Chicago 'L' station in Edgewater, Chicago, Illinois, U.S.
- Bryn Mawr station (Metra), a Metra station in South Shore, Chicago, Illinois
- Bryn Mawr station (SEPTA Metro), a SEPTA station in Radnor Township, Pennsylvania, U.S.
- Bryn Mawr station (SEPTA Regional Rail), a SEPTA station in Bryn Mawr, Pennsylvania

== Other uses ==
- Bryn Mawr (horse), a racehorse
- Bryn Mawr Stereo, a defunct consumer electronics retail chain
- Bryn Mawr Classical Review, an open-access journal
- Harriton House (originally Bryn Mawr), a historic house in Pennsylvania, U.S.
