= Hilgay Heronry =

Protected area in Norfolk, England

Coordinates: 52.566°N 0.411°E

- Site of Special Scientific Interest
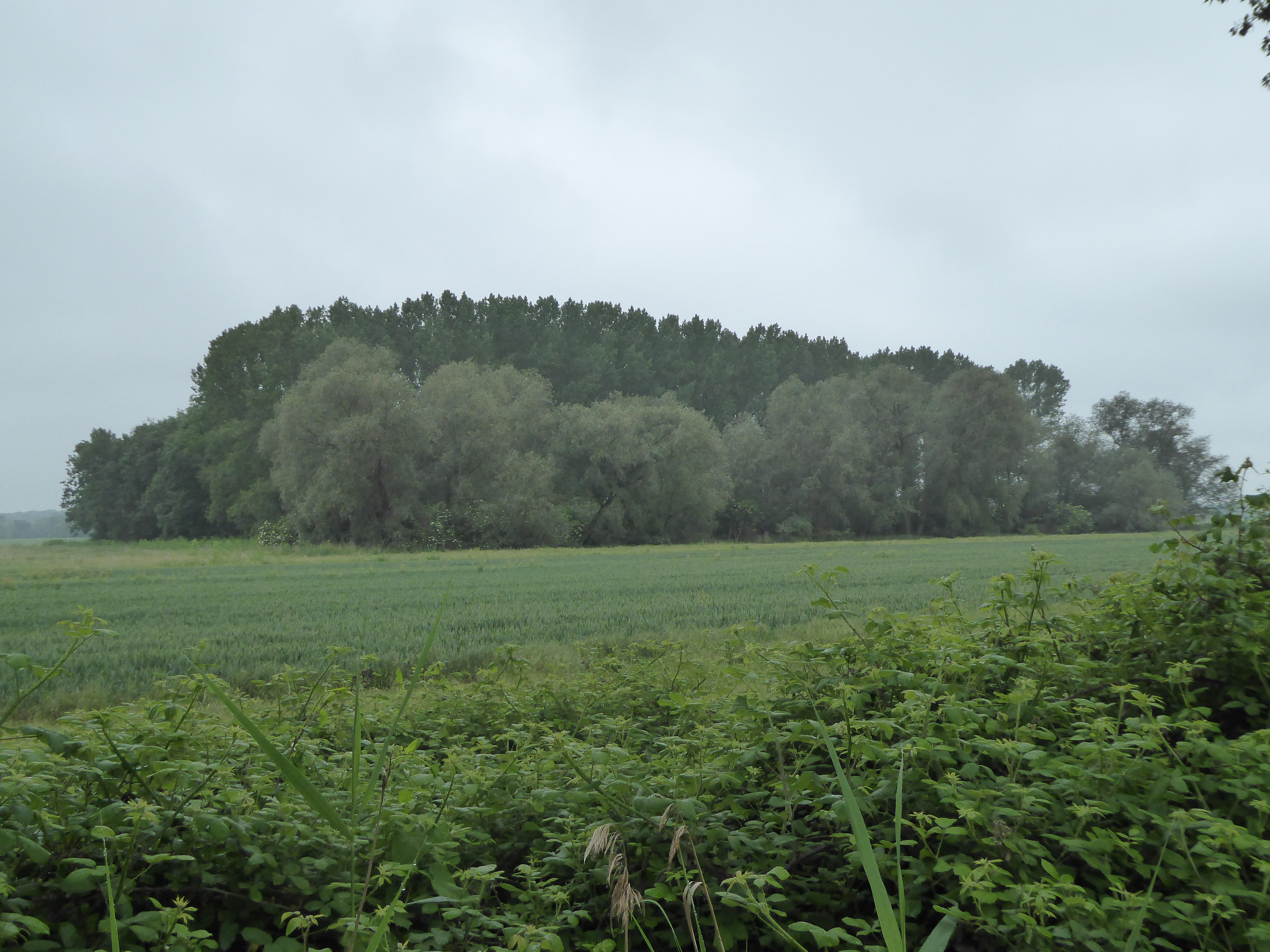
- Location of Hilgay Heronry.
- Area of search: Norfolk
- Grid reference: TL 635 992
- Interest: Biological
- Area: 1.8 hectares (4.4 acres)
- Notification date: 1985
- Location map: Magic Map

Hilgay Heronry is a 1.8-hectare (4.4-acre) biological Site of Special Scientific Interest south of Downham Market in Norfolk, England.

This small wood has a nationally important breeding colony of grey herons, with around forty nests each year in larch and ash trees. Nearby drainage dykes on The Fens provide feeding grounds.

The site is private land with no public access.
