= Caeau Blaenau-mawr =

Protected area in Carmarthenshire, Wales

- Site of Special Scientific Interest
- Location within Wales
- Location of Caeau Blaenau-mawr.
- Area of search: Carmarthenshire
- Grid reference: SN5958912239
- Coordinates: 51.791132°N 4.0372827°W
- Interest: Biological
- Area: 10.49 ha (25.9 acres)
- Notification date: 21 August 1998

Caeau Blaenau-mawr is a species rich damp grassland that is a Site of Special Scientific Interest in Carmarthen & Dinefwr, Wales.

== See also ==
- List of Sites of Special Scientific Interest in Carmarthen & Dinefwr
