= Brechfa Forest =

Forest in Carmarthenshire, Wales

Coordinates: 51.99°N 4.14°W

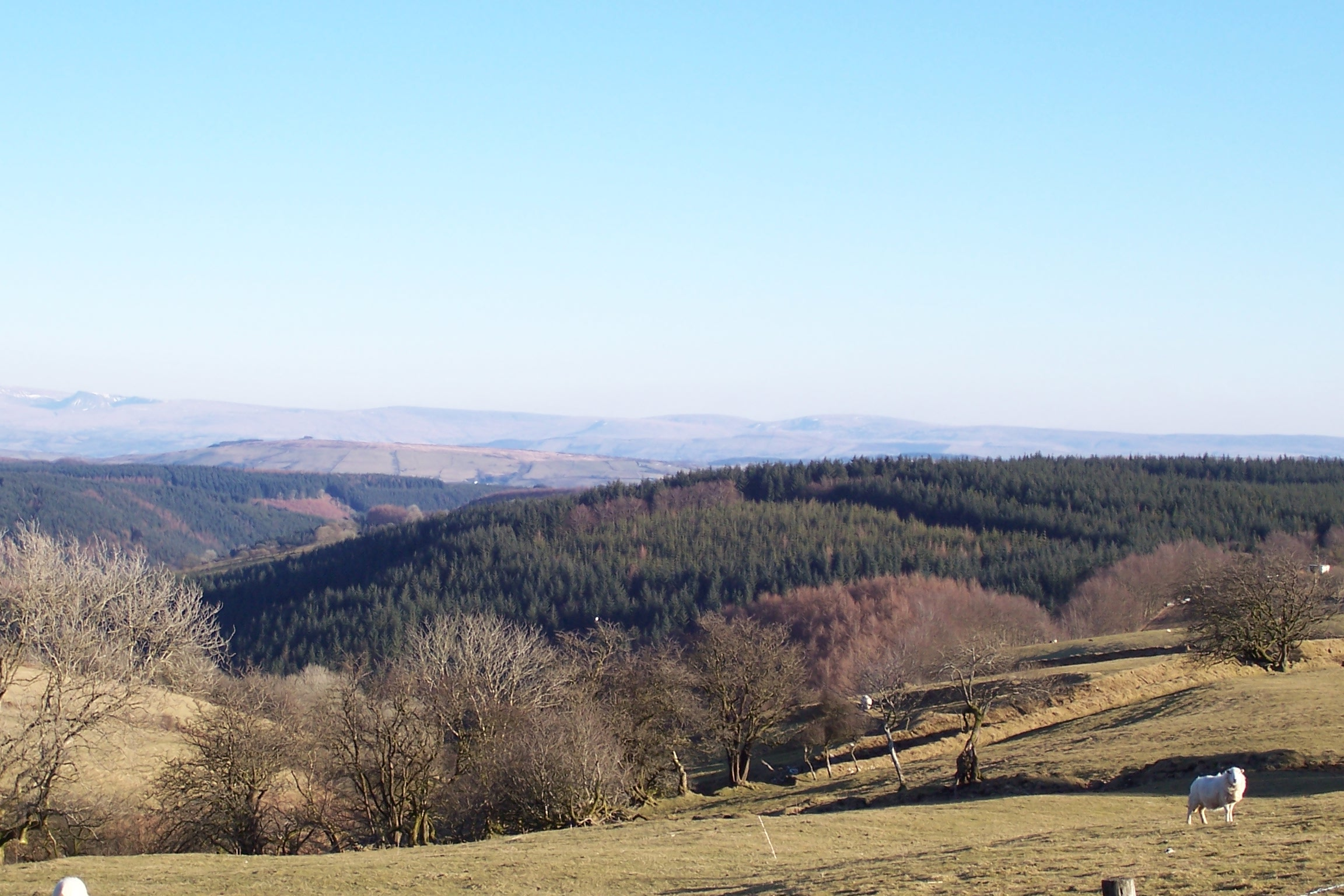
View from Rhos Blaen Gorlech, Brechfa Forest

The Brechfa Forest is a forest in Carmarthenshire, south Wales. Brechfa Forest is the 'modern' name for part of the ancient Glyn Cothi Forest. From before records began in the 6th century the communities in the 15 villages which encircle Glyn Cothi Forest were managing it to provide employment, building materials, products, and grazing. At various times the forest has been the refuge of Welsh princes fighting the Norman invasion, a royal hunting forest, and for two centuries was the 'Texas' of Wales, producing large quantities of oil for lamps. and was a major supplier of timber for the trenches and explosives during World War One.

The Forestry Commission was established to increase timber production during World War One taking control of woodland which was no longer productive. Like the New Forest and the Forest of Dean, Glyn Cothi Forest was still being actively managed by the local community at this point and was a major supplier of timber for the trenches, as well as oil and explosives. During the depression in the 1930s the UK government purchased land which had been part of the original Glyn Cothi forest but had been converted to agriculture. Much of the planting work to create conifer plantations and construction of forest roads was carried out by young unemployed men from a Ministry of Labour work camp. Many came from the distressed coal mining communities, and were recruited for training in one of a number of Instructional Centres created by the Ministry, most of which were on Forestry Commission property; by 1938, the Ministry had 38 Instructional Centres across Britain. The hutted camp in Brechfa was later used to house Basque children who were refugees from the Spanish Civil War.

Management and maintenance of the forest continued to be a major source of employment for local residents until the 1980s when Forestry Commission policies changed to increased mechanisation and subcontracting of work. Carmarthenshire County Council then started regeneration projects to develop Brechfa Forest and the adjoining Llanllwni Mountain as tourist attractions and for recreation.

Brechfa Forest provides open access space for walkers, horse riders and cyclists. Tourism is the second largest source of employment in the villages surrounding the forest. It has become one of Wales' prime destinations for mountain bikers, and is home to several trails designed specifically for mountain biking. With plans to build a mountain bike centre.

The area is now one of the pilot areas for Wales on supporting the development of a strong sustainable local economy through supporting the communities to take the lead in the development of the area.

From 1 April 2013 the Countryside Council for Wales, Environment Agency Wales, the Forestry Commission Wales and some aspects of the Welsh Government's activities was merged into a single Welsh Government sponsored body, Natural Resources Wales (Welsh: Cyfoeth Naturiol Cymru. This included the transfer of the management responsibilities of Brechfa Forest to Natural Resources Wales.
