= Caeau Tir-mawr =

Protected area in Carmarthenshire, Wales

- Site of Special Scientific Interest
- Location within Wales
- Location of Caeau Tir-mawr.
- Area of search: Carmarthenshire
- Grid reference: SN6490020571
- Coordinates: 51.867309°N 3.9635805°W
- Interest: Biological
- Area: 13.23 ha (32.7 acres)
- Notification date: 3 March 1984

Caeau Tir-mawr is a Site of Special Scientific Interest in Carmarthen & Dinefwr, Wales.

== See also ==
- List of Sites of Special Scientific Interest in Carmarthen & Dinefwr
