= Minette =

Minette may refer to:

== People ==
- Minette et Lise (1767–1807; 1771–?), Haitian actress sisters
- "Minette" (Henrietta of England) (1644–1670), daughter of King Charles I and Duchess of Orléans
- "Minette" (Anne-Catherine de Ligniville, Madame Helvétius) (1722–1800), French salon hostess
- Minette Batters, Baroness Batters, (born 1967), British farmer.
- Minette Walters (born 1949), a British crime writer
- Elise Minette Levy (1919–2023), American ballerina

== Other uses ==
- a geological term used to locally describe a particular type of lamprophyre
- Minette (ore)
- Patron-Minette, a fictional criminal gang in the novel Les Misérables

== See also ==
- Minet (disambiguation)
- Minnette
- Mynett
