= Locomotives of the West Lancashire and Liverpool, Southport and Preston Junction Railways =

The West Lancashire Railway (WLR) and Liverpool, Southport and Preston Junction Railway (LS&PJR) both had a varied fleet of locomotives, although separate companies they shared a lot of facilities and staff. Their locomotives were administered separately until December 1888 when they combined their locomotive stocks and operated a single stable.

The WLR did not have a definite livery and their locomotives were a variety of colours, apparently being chosen by the manufacturer, the LS&PJR followed suit.

== West Lancashire Railway locomotives ==
The lines first Superintendent of rolling stock was Jack Willgoose until he retired in 1888, he was succeeded by John Edmondson who came from the Manchester, Sheffield and Lincolnshire Railway, he stayed in the post until the Lancashire and Yorkshire Railway (L&YR) take-over. (Note: The first superintendent's name may be Willgoose (Cotterall 1982) or Wildgoose (Marshall 1972).)

Upon opening in 1878 the line had two 0-4-2 tender locomotives built by Sharp, Stewart and Company, they were initially named Edwd Holden and Sir T. Hesketh and were painted bright blue with plenty of polished brass. Sometime later, probably in 1880 but by 1882, these locomotives were renamed no.1 Southport and no.2 Longton respectively. No.1 was scrapped in 1896. No.2 was renumbered 7 in 1893 then allocated 1367 in the L&YR list on take-over but was found to be unfit for service and was scrapped in 1897.

A third engine, no. 3 Banks was delivered from Sharp, Stewart and Company in 1878, it was similar to the first two locomotives except it was fitted with a saddle tank and therefore had no tender, it was rebuilt as a tender engine in 1885, it was also painted bright blue on delivery. No.3 was scrapped in 1895.

For the Tarleton branch a Manning Wardle 0-6-0ST was purchased in 1882, this locomotive was painted black, it was no. 4 named Tarleton with the name inscribed on the sides of the tank in yellow. No.4 was renumbered 10 in 1893 then allocated 1370 in the L&YR list on take-over but was found to be unfit for service and was scrapped in 1897.

Once the line was fully opened, and services to Blackburn had started, more locomotives were required, unfortunately the company was short of funds. They sought out second-hand locomotives and found four suitable locomotives for sale by the London, Brighton and South Coast Railway (LB&SCR), two were purchased in February 1883 and the other two in April 1833.

The first two were 2-2-2 tender locomotives built at Brighton in 1866. They were given new numbers but retained their original names and livery, yellow with a dark green edging. They became WLR No.5 Dorking and no.6 Horsham. No.5 was scrapped in October 1885 and No.6 was scrapped in October 1885.

The second pair of locomotives were 2-4-0 tender locomotives built at Brighton in 1862. They were nominally the same but had different wheelbases. They were un-named when on the LB&SCR but supplied with new names on delivery. They became No.7 Blackburn and no.8 Preston. No.7 was withdrawn in 1890 and scrapped in1893. No.8 was withdrawn in 1887, it is not known when it was scrapped.

No.9 was a 0-6-0 tender locomotive also bought second-hand in July 1885 from the LB&SCR, it had been built at Brighton in 1859, but had been laid aside for two years in 1876 then refurbished with a different boiler. The locomotive had been un-named and remained so, coming in LB&SCR goods livery of dark olive green with just new number plates. No.9 was withdrawn in 1895, it was replaced by a new no.9, and was used for ballast duties until February 1896 when it became a stationary boiler at Meols Cop repair shop. It was scrapped when the L&YR took-over.|

Locomotives no.10 Hesketh Park, no.11 Crossens and no.12 Churchtown were bought from Kitson and Company in 1884, they were 0-4-0WT of a type usually used on street tramways. The locomotives were without the overall casing which would have been fitted for the street environment but was unnecessary on a railway. They were painted Brighton yellow and were used on the local Southport Central to Crossens service. When the service stopped in 1886 they were returned to Kitson's for them to sell on the WLR's behalf. One of these engines was sold to Richard White in 1894, one was sold to a contractor in Morecombe in 1887 and one was sold to the Corringham Light Railway between 1886 and 1888. Sometime later one of them appeared at Darlington Works on the North Eastern Railway. (Note: Different sources are not agreed about which one went where. The Corringham Light Railway was not established until 1899 , Phillips (1990) suggests that they purchased a similar Kitson locomotive from the Barry Docks Company.)

The number 5 was re-used for a locomotive in October 1885 when a used Manning Wardle 0-6-0 tender locomotive was purchased from the LB&SCR. It arrived in LB&SCR livery of dark olive green, it was named Brighton. The locomotive was firstly leased to the contractor working on the LS&PJR until late 1887, then it was used on the WLR until1894. This locomotive was sold to the Manchester, Sheffield and Lincolnshire Railway in 1894.

The last two locomotives re-used locomotive numbers 8 and 9. These two locomotives were class 9F 0-6-2T bought from the Manchester, Sheffield and Lincolnshire Railway in 1895, they remained un-named. They were built by Beyer, Peacock and Company and were the last two of a batch. (Note: It is uncertain if these locomotives were delivered new direct from the manufacturer or if they were delivered to the MSLR first and arrived at the WLR second-hand.) The locomotives were delivered painted in a deep purple colour. The locomotives were taken over by the L&YR being numbered 1368 and 1369 respectively

From 1885 to 1887 the company found it necessary to hire two locomotives to cover for their own locomotives undergoing repairs.

== Liverpool, Southport and Preston Junction Railway locomotives ==
Six locomotives were needed to work the line when it opened, they were purchased by Edward Holden and leased to the railway. They carried a brass plate inside the cab inscribed "Edward Holden Esq., Shipley, Owner." The plates were removed in August 1895 when the company purchased the locomotives from Mr. Holden.

Locomotives no.1 and no. 2 were purchased second-hand from the Furness Railway, these were 0-6-0 tender locomotives built by Sharp, Stewart and Company in 1884, they had an Indian Red livery which they retained. Cabs were fitted. They were still in service when the L&YR took over but they were not taken into their service and broken up.

Locomotives no.3 and no.4 were purchased new from Kitson and Company, these were 0-6-2T, they were painted dark green on arrival. They were still in service when the L&YR took over and became 1363 and 1364 after some modifications, they remained in service until 1912.

Locomotives no.5 and no.6 were purchased new from Kitson and Company, these were 2-4-2T, they were painted Brighton yellow on arrival. They were still in service when the L&YR took over and became 1365 and 1366 after some modifications, 1365 remained in service until 1912 and 1366 until 1917.

== Locomotive summary ==
| WLR No. | LS&PJR No. | Type | Manufacturer | Built | Acquired | Name | Combined No. | L&YR No. | |
|---|---|---|---|---|---|---|---|---|---|
| 1 | | 0-4-2 | Sharp, Stewart and Company | 1878 | 1878 | Edwd Holden | | | Renamed Southport by 1882. Scrapped in 1896. |
| 2 | | 0-4-2 | Sharp, Stewart and Company | 1878 | 1878 | Sir T. Hesketh | 7 | (1367) | Renamed Longton by 1882. Allocated L&YR number but was scrapped before getting it. |
| 3 | | 0-4-2T | Sharp, Stewart and Company | 1878 | 1878 | Banks | | | Rebuilt as a tender engine in 1885. Scrapped in 1895. |
| 4 | | 0-6-0ST | Manning Wardle | 1882 | 1882 | Tarleton | 10 | (1370) | Allocated L&YR number but was scrapped before getting it. |
| 5 (1883–1885) | | 2-2-2 | LB&SCR's Brighton Works | 1866 | 1883 | Dorking | | | ex-LB&SCR no.475. Scrapped in 1885. |
| 5 (1885–1894) | | 0-6-0 | Manning Wardle | 1866 | 1885 | Brighton | | | ex-LB&SCR no.386. Sold to the Manchester, Sheffield and Lincolnshire Railway in 1894 |
| 6 | | 2-2-2 | LB&SCR's Brighton Works | 1866 | 1883 | Horsham | | | ex-LB&SCR no.487. Scrapped in 1887. |
| 7 | | 2-4-0 | LB&SCR's Brighton Works | 1862 | 1883 | Blackburn | | | ex-LB&SCR no.455. Scrapped in 1893. |
| 8 (1883–1887) | | 2-4-0 | LB&SCR's Brighton Works | 1862 | 1883 | Preston | | | ex-LB&SCR no.363. Withdrawn in 1887. |
| 8 (1894–1897) | | 0-6-2 | Beyer, Peacock and Company | 1894 | 1894 | | 8 | 1368 | Originally built for the Manchester, Sheffield and Lincolnshire Railway and acquired new by the WLR by arrangement with them. |
| 9 (1885–1895 | | 0-6-0 | LB&SCR's Brighton Works | 1859 | 1885 | | | | ex-LB&SCR no.384. Used for ballast work from 1895 to 1896 then used as a stationary engine in Southport repair shops. |
| 9 (1895–1897) | | 0-6-2 | Beyer, Peacock and Company | 1895 | 1895 | | 9 | 1369 | Originally built for the Manchester, Sheffield and Lincolnshire Railway and acquired new by the WLR by arrangement with them. |
| 10 | | 0-4-0WT | Kitson and Company | 1884 | 1884 | Hesketh Park | | | Possibly sold to Richard White in 1894 |
| 11 | | 0-4-0WT | Kitson and Company | 1884 | 1884 | Crossens | | | Possibly sold to the Corringham Light Railway in 1886–1887. |
| 12 | | 0-4-0WT | Kitson and Company | 1884 | 1884 | Churchtown | | | Possibly sold to a contractor in Morecombe in 1886–1887. |
| | 1 | 0-6-0 | Sharp, Stewart and Company | 1884 | 1887 | | 1 | (1361) | ex-Furness Railway no.120. Allocated L&YR number but was scrapped before getting it. |
| | 2 | 0-6-0 | Sharp, Stewart and Company | 1884 | 1887 | | 2 | (1362) | ex-Furness Railway no.121. Allocated L&YR number but was scrapped before getting it. |
| | 3 | 0-6-2T | Kitson and Company | 1887 | 1887 | | 3 | 1363 | |
| | 4 | 0-6-2T | Kitson and Company | 1887 | 1887 | | 4 | 1364 | |
| | 5 | 2-4-2T | Kitson and Company | 1887 | 1887 | | 5 | 1365 | |
| | 6 | 2-4-2T | Kitson and Company | 1887 | 1887 | | 6 | 1366 | |

== Lancashire and Yorkshire Railway ==
The L&YR took ten locomotives into stock when they took over the two companies, they immediately scrapped four of them, numbers 1, 2, 7 and 10. The remainder were modified having their Westinghouse air brakes replaced by standard L&YR vacuum brake equipment and by having their driving positions changed from right to left-hand side. Subsequent modifications were made to each of the locomotives to standardise them with existing L&YR stock as much as possible.

== Bibliography ==
- Baxter, Bertram (1982). British Locomotive Catalogue 1825–1923, Volume 3B: Lancashire and Yorkshire Railway and its constituent companies. Ashbourne, Derbyshire, England: Moorland Publishing Company. ISBN 0-903485-85-0.
- Cotterall, J.E. (1982). The West Lancashire Railway. Oakwood.
- Marshall, John (1969). The Lancashire & Yorkshire Railway. Vol. 1. Newton Abbot: David & Charles. ISBN 978-0-7153-4352-4.
- Marshall, John (1972). The Lancashire & Yorkshire Railway. Vol. 3. Newton Abbot: David & Charles. ISBN 978-0-7153-5320-2.
