= Mynett =

Mynett is a surname. Notable people with the surname include:

- Alan Mynett (born 1966), English cricketer
- Ted Mynett (1900–1961), English railwayman

== See also ==
- Minette (disambiguation)
- Mylett
- Mynott
