= 1899 in South Africa =

- Decades: 1870s; 1880s; 1890s; 1900s; 1910s
- See also: List of years in South Africa

The following lists events that happened during 1899 in South Africa.

== Incumbents ==
- Governor of the Cape of Good Hope and High Commissioner for Southern Africa:Alfred Milner.
- Governor of the Colony of Natal: Charles Bullen Hugh Mitchell.
- State President of the Orange Free State: Martinus Theunis Steyn.
- State President of the South African Republic: Paul Kruger.
- Prime Minister of the Cape of Good Hope: William Philip Schreiner.
- Prime Minister of the Colony of Natal: Henry Binns (until 17 August), Albert Henry Hime (starting 17 August).

== Events ==
April

- The Transvaal government orders Asiatics to move into Locations specified by the government before 1 July.

May

- 4 – Cape Town based food packaging company Imperial Cold Storage and Supply Company is founded in London.
- 5 – Sir Alfred Milner, High Commissioner of South Africa and Governor of the Cape of Good Hope, sends a telegram to Joseph Chamberlain urging him to intervene in the South African Republic.

October

- 1 – Jan Gysbert Hugo Bosman, a.k.a. Bosman di Ravelli, a concert pianist and composer, leaves South Africa for London.
- 4 – The South African Republic issues an order to "all White inhabitants" within the Kingdom of Swaziland, to evacuate, with the exception of property owners eligible for active military service. British subjects inside Swaziland are evicted and escorted to the border with Mozambique.
- 5 – The 7,000 Zulu mineworkers in the Witwatersrand are assembled by mine recruiter John Sidney Marwick at Johannesburg so that they can be transported home before war breaks out with Britain.
- 11 – The South African Republic declares war on Britain and launches the Second Boer War which will only end in 1902.
- 13 – The Siege of Mafeking begins.
- 14 – The Siege of Kimberley begins.
- 20 – In the Battle of Talana Hill, the first major clash of the conflict near Dundee, Natal, the British Army drives the Boers from a hilltop position, but with heavy casualties, including their Commanding General Sir Penn Symons.
- 28 – The Swaziland Commando unit of the South African Republic Army attacks and burns the British police post at Kwaliweni. Warned by Swaziland's King Ngwane V, the 20 policemen are able to evacuate the post office and flee to Ingwavuma, which the Commandos attack next.

November

- 2 – The Siege of Ladysmith begins.
- 9 – The first British transport of supplemental troops arrives at Cape Town to enter the Second Boer War.
- 16 – A British Army train carrying troops is wrecked in South Africa near Estcourt by the Boers, and 56 men are taken prisoner, including Winston Churchill.
- 19 – The Boers redeploy 4,000 of the 8,000 troops assigned to the Siege of Mafeking, because of the heavy resistance by the British defenders.
- 20 – Lieutenant-General John French arrives at the Colesberg in the Cape Colony front to co-ordinate the defense of the British colonies in South Africa against the Boer attack and conducts a series of distracting maneuvers that succeed in preventing the South African Republic from attempting an invasion of the Cape Colony.
- 21 – The Boers cut off all telegraph lines and seize the railway connecting Estcourt to the rest of the Cape Colony.

== Births ==
- 30 January – Max Theiler, a virologist and the first South African to receive a Nobel Prize, is born in Pretoria.
- 18 February – Aegidius Jean Blignaut, short story writer and creator of Hottentot Ruiter, is born in Kroonstad.

== Deaths ==
- 6 June – Sir Henry Binns, sugar cane farmer, founder of the Umhlanga Valley Sugar Estate Company and Natal politician, dies in Pietermaritzburg at the age of 61.

== Railways ==
=== Railway lines opened ===
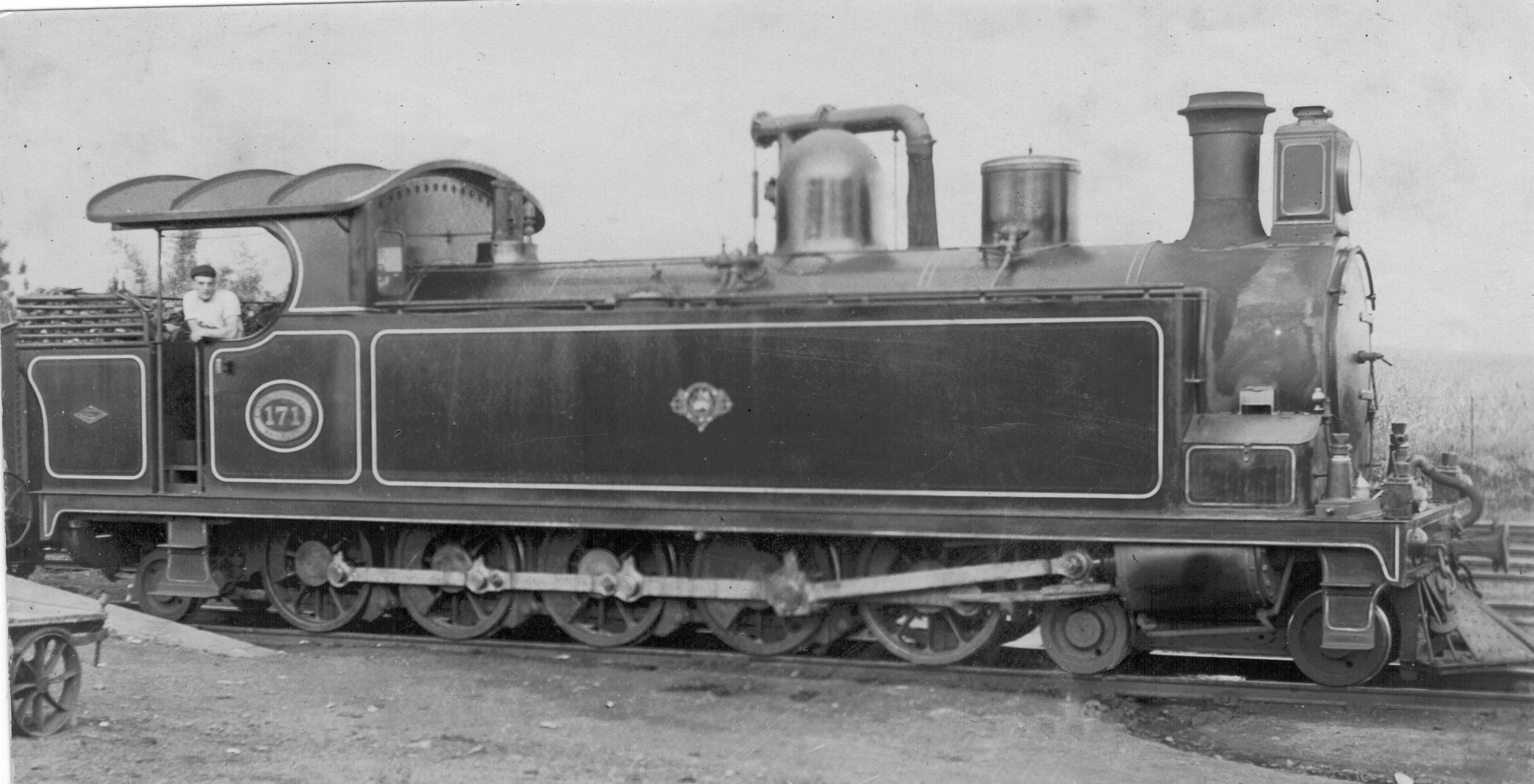
NGR Class C Reid Tenwheeler

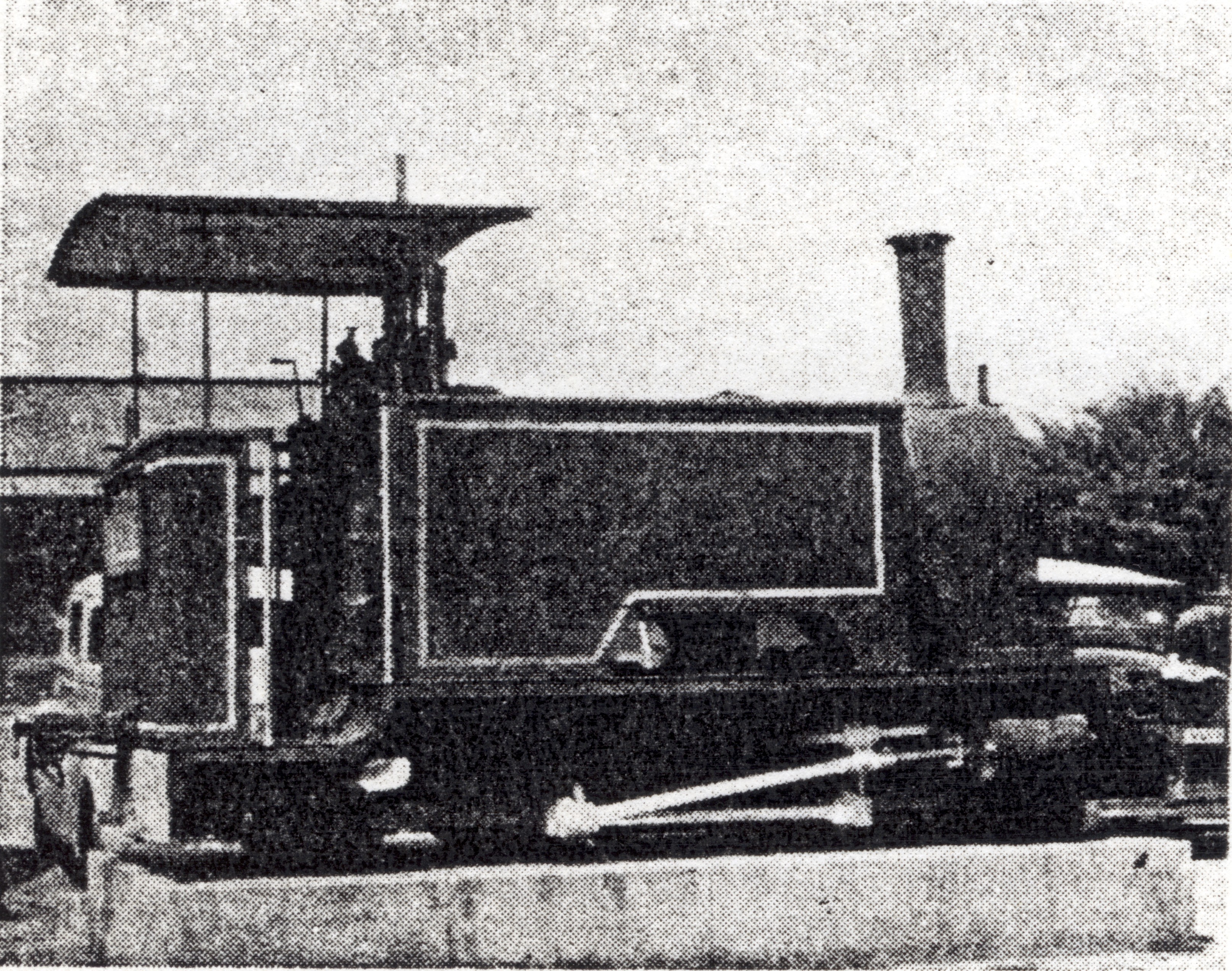
Walvis Bay engine Hope

- 31 January – Free State – Wolwehoek to Heilbron, 30 miles 61 chains (49.5 kilometres).
- 12 April – Cape Central – Roodewal to Swellendam, 41 miles (66.0 kilometres).
- 1 May – Transvaal – Potgietersrus to Pietersburg, 39 miles (62.8 kilometres).
- 25 October – Natal – Pietermaritzburg to New Hanover, 29 miles 51 chains (47.7 kilometres).

=== Locomotives ===
- The Natal Government Railways places the first of 101 Class C 4-10-2T Reid Tenwheeler locomotives in service. In 1912 they will be designated Class H on the South African Railways (SAR).
- The New Cape Central Railway places its first Cape 7th Class 4-8-0 Mastodon type locomotive in service. In 1925 they will be designated Class 7E on the SAR.
- The Walvis Bay Railway places a single 2-4-2 tank locomotive named Hope in service.
- Rand Mines acquires two narrow gauge 0-4-0 tank steam locomotives from Avonside Engine Company.
