= Minet =

Minet may refer to:

== People ==
- Minet (surname)

== Places ==
- Minet Country Park, London, UK
- Minet el-Beida, a bay north of Latakia, Syria
- Minet el Hosn, an ancient city located in what is now Beirut

== Other ==
- Minet ed Dhalia point, an archaeological term relating to flint tools
