= Minnette =

Minnette or Minnetta is an Anglo Norman given name and surname, and it's a variant of the Norman French surname Minnett. Notable persons with the name include:

== People with the given name ==
- Minnette Barrett (1880–1964), American actress
- Minnette Doderer (1923–2005), American politician
- Minnette Lehmann (1928–2016), American artist
- Minnette Gersh Lenier (1945–2011), American magician and teacher
- Minnetta Sammis Leonard (1879–1960), American educator
- Minnette de Silva (1918–1998), Sri Lankan architect
- Minnetta Theodora Taylor (1860–1911), American poet, suffragist
- Minnette Vári (born 1968), South African artist

== People with the surname ==
- Dylan Minnette (born 1996), American actor, singer, and musician
