= Walvis Bay 2-4-2T Hope =

South African steam locomotive

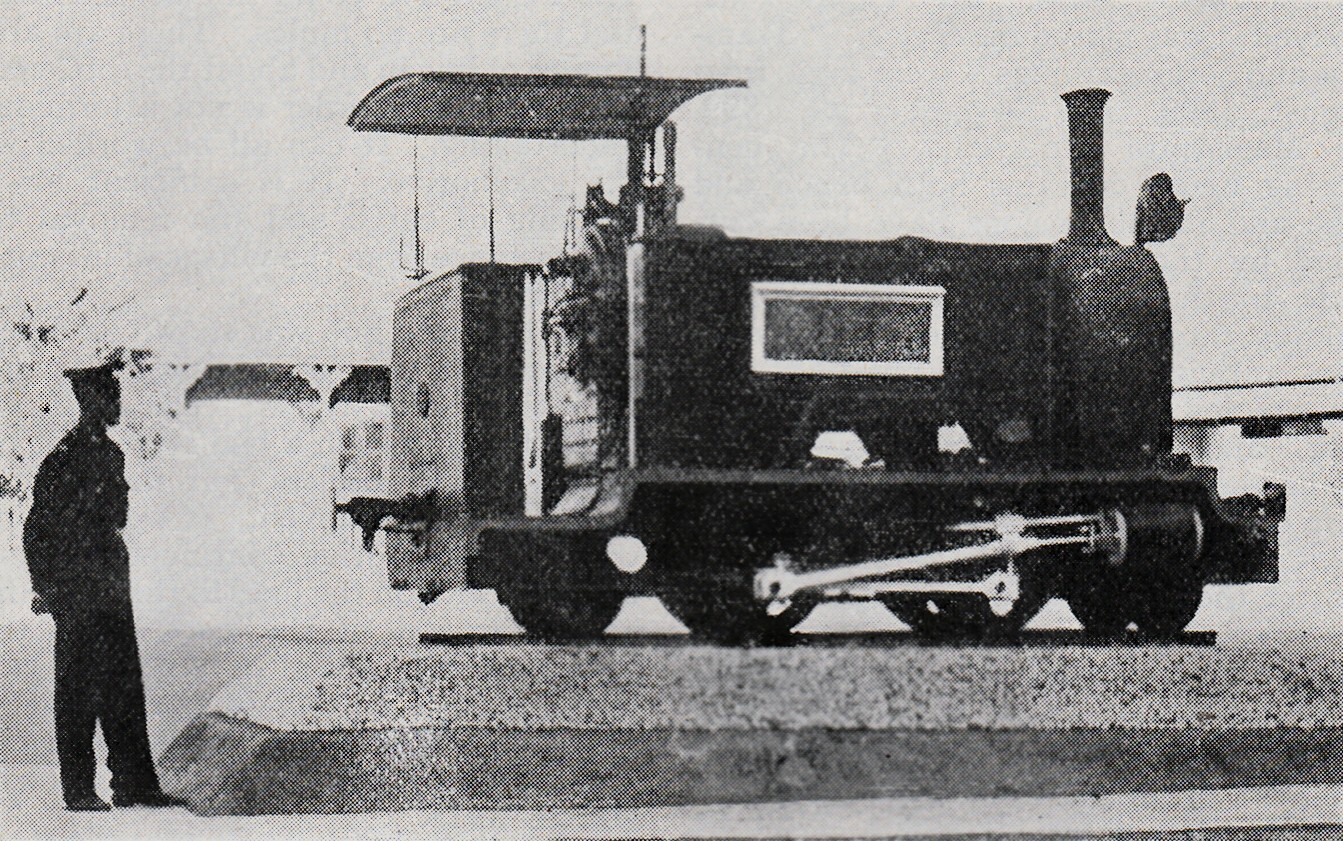
- The engine Hope plinthed in Windhoek, c. 1950
Type and origin
- Power type: Steam
- Designer: Kerr, Stuart and Company
- Builder: Kerr, Stuart and Company
- Serial number: 652
- Build date: 1899
- Total produced: 1
Specifications
- Configuration
  - Whyte: 2-4-2T
  - UIC: 1B1n2t
- Driver: 2nd coupled axle
- Gauge: 2 ft 6 in (762 mm) Namaqualand
- Leading dia.: 14 in (356 mm)
- Coupled dia.: 24 in (610 mm)
- Trailing dia.: 14 in (356 mm)
- Frame type: Plate
- Loco weight: 12 LT (12,190 kg)
- Fuel type: Coal
- Fuel capacity: 5 long hundredweight (0.3 t)
- Water cap.: 100 imp gal (455 L)
- Firebox
  - Type: Round-top
  - Grate area: 3.5 sq ft (0.33 m^{2})
- Boiler
  - Diameter: 2 ft 1 in (635 mm)
  - Tube plates: 5 ft 1 in (1,549 mm)
  - Small tubes: 36: 1 3/4 in (44 mm)
- Boiler pressure: 120 psi (827 kPa)
- Heating surface: 102 sq ft (9.5 m^{2})
- Cylinders: Two
- Cylinder size: 6 in (152 mm) bore 10 in (254 mm) stroke
- Valve gear: Stephenson
- Valve type: Murdoch's D slide
- Couplers: Buffers-and-chain
Performance figures
- Tractive effort: 1,020 lbf (4.5 kN) @ 75%
Career
- Operators: Walvis Bay Railway
- Number in class: 1
- Official name: Hope
- Delivered: 1899
- First run: 1899
- Disposition: Plinthed at Walvis Bay station

The Walvis Bay 2-4-2T Hope of 1899 was a South African steam locomotive from the pre-Union era in the Cape of Good Hope.

In 1899, the Walvis Bay Tramway in the British territory of Walvis Bay, a Cape of Good Hope exclave in German South West Africa, placed a single 2-4-2T locomotive in service. It remained in service until 1915, when a Cape gauge railway was opened between Swakopmund and Walvis Bay.

== Walvis Bay Tramway ==
The British territory surrounding the port of Walvis Bay in Deutsch-Südwest-Afrika (DSWA), an exclave with an area of 434 square miles (1,124 square kilometres), was administered as part of the Cape of Good Hope. The Walvis Bay railway began as a 2 ft 6 in (762 mm) gauge horse-drawn tramway within the confines of the harbour town. The gauge was most probably selected to ensure a wide enough path for horses between the rails, as was probably also the case on the light mule-drawn Namaqualand Railway, which was built to the same gauge between Port Nolloth and O'okiep in northwestern Cape of Good Hope.

== Manufacturer ==
In June 1899, a single 2-4-2T locomotive was shipped from Kerr, Stuart and Company of Stoke-on-Trent in England. It arrived in Walvis Bay on 22 August 1899 aboard the barque Primera, along with a distilling plant, railway trucks and 200 tons of coal. The engine was named Hope and was placed in service on the short Walfish Bay Tramway.

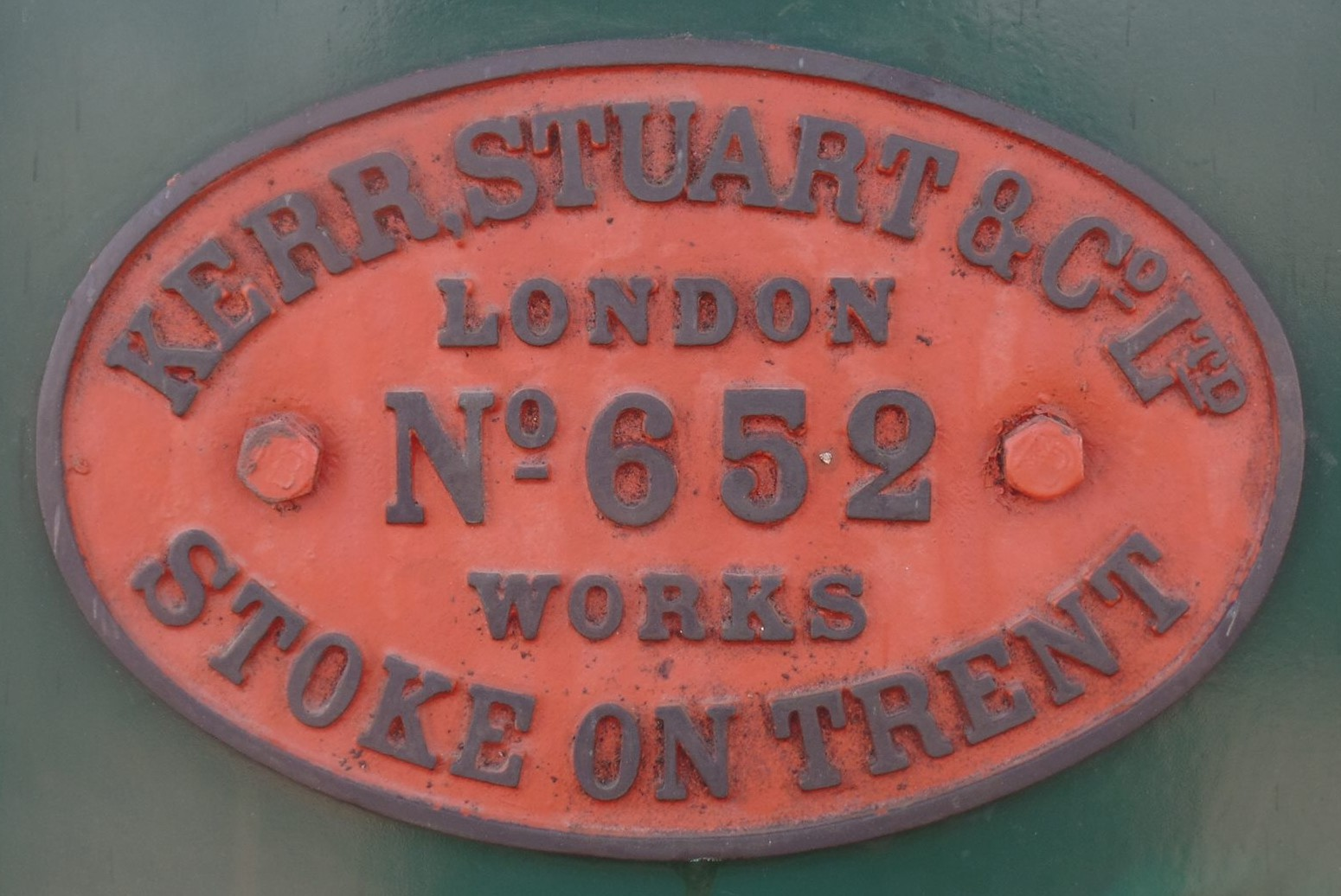

The locomotive was a standard Sirdar class engine, similar to the two Class NG1 0-4-0T locomotives which were to enter service on the Bezuidenhout Light Railway a year later during the Second Boer War, but with leading and trailing pony wheels added and a tropical cab roof. Kerr, Stuart was a supplier of contractors' engines and often built locomotives to standard designs, but without frame stretchers and axles. These semi-completed locomotives were kept in stock until an order was placed. This allowed them to be delivered with a minimum of delay.

== Characteristics ==
The engine was built on 5/8 inch (16 millimetres) thick plate frames, arranged outside the coupled wheels. It had a boiler with an inside diameter of 2 feet 1 inch (635 millimetres), set at an operating pressure of 120 pounds per square inch (827 kilopascals). Its inclined cylinders were arranged outside the plate frames and had a bore of 6 inches (152 millimetres) and a 10 inches (254 millimetres) stroke. It used Murdoch's D type slide valves, actuated by Stephenson valve gear through rocker arms.

It had coupled wheels of 24 inches (610 millimetres) in diameter. The coal bunker had a capacity of 5 long hundredweight (0.3 tonnes), and the side-tanks had a water capacity of 100 imperial gallons (455 litres). The engine's total weight in full working order was 12 long tons (12,190 kilograms) and had a tractive effort of 1,020 pounds-force (4.5 kilonewtons) at 75% of boiler pressure.

== Walvis Bay Railway ==
In 1899, the Cape government began to extend the tramway as a railway to a terminus named Plum, 11 miles (18 kilometres) due east of Walvis Bay near Rooibank, essentially in the middle of the Namib desert on the DSWA border. The decision to build the 12-mile-long (19-kilometre) railway between the harbour and the international border with DSWA followed the construction of the Swakopmund-Windhuk Staatsbahn in DSWA in 1897. It was an attempt not to forfeit freight trade opportunities into the interior once that line was completed.

The object of the railway was to bridge the region of shifting dunes between the harbour and the interior so that goods could be forwarded by rail to Plum and then by ox wagon from there into the interior. The extension was completed in 1903, but saw very limited use, mainly to obtain firewood and to render possible the occasional picnic in the desert.

== Service ==
The engine Hope operated on the railway for some five years, until it became apparent by 1904 that the short link had no economic benefit. In March 1905, the Acting Magistrate reported an income over two years of £39 against expenditure of £1,200. By then, sections of track of more than 1/2 mile (0.8 kilometres) had been buried during a sandstorm under 30 feet (9 metres) high dunes.

The main reason for abandoning the railway was the opening of the copper mines at Tsumeb, and the Otavi Railway construction commenced in November 1903 to connect Tsumeb with the port of Swakopmund, just north of the DSWA border. The locomotive continued to work the 3 miles (5 kilometres) of remaining track in and about the settlement, working cargo in the harbour and removing insanitary rubbish to a safe distance from the village.

== Preservation ==
After a Cape gauge railway was opened between Swakopmund and Walvis Bay in March 1915, the locomotive remained stored in a local siding in Walvis Bay for years, until it was repaired for preservation by the South African Railways administration and plinthed in Windhoek during the 1940s. It was returned to Walvis Bay in 1963 to be plinthed at Walvis Bay railway station. The engine has since been enclosed in a glass cage to protect it against Walvis Bay's notoriously corrosive sea air.

== Illustration ==
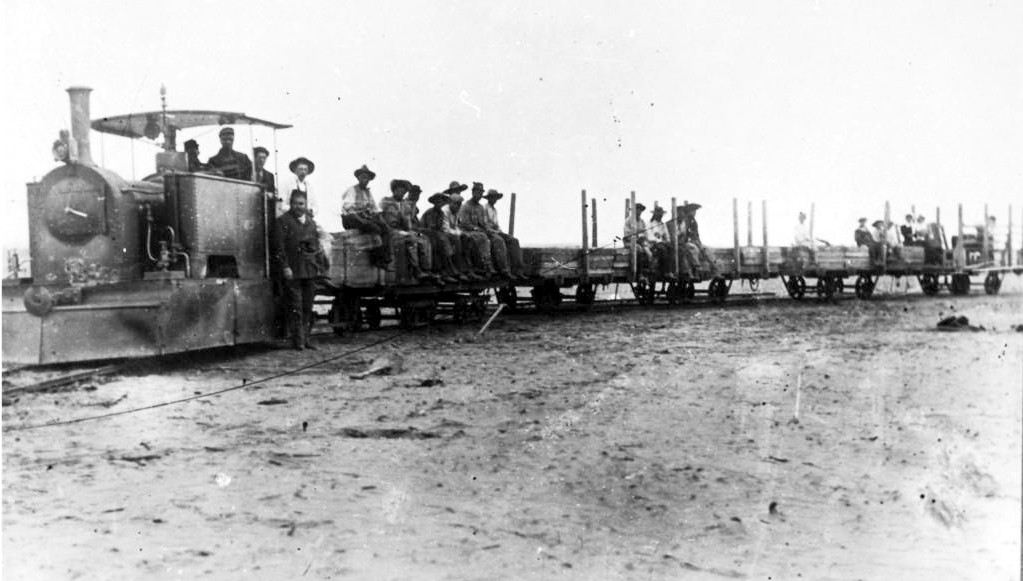
Hope on a work train, c. 1899

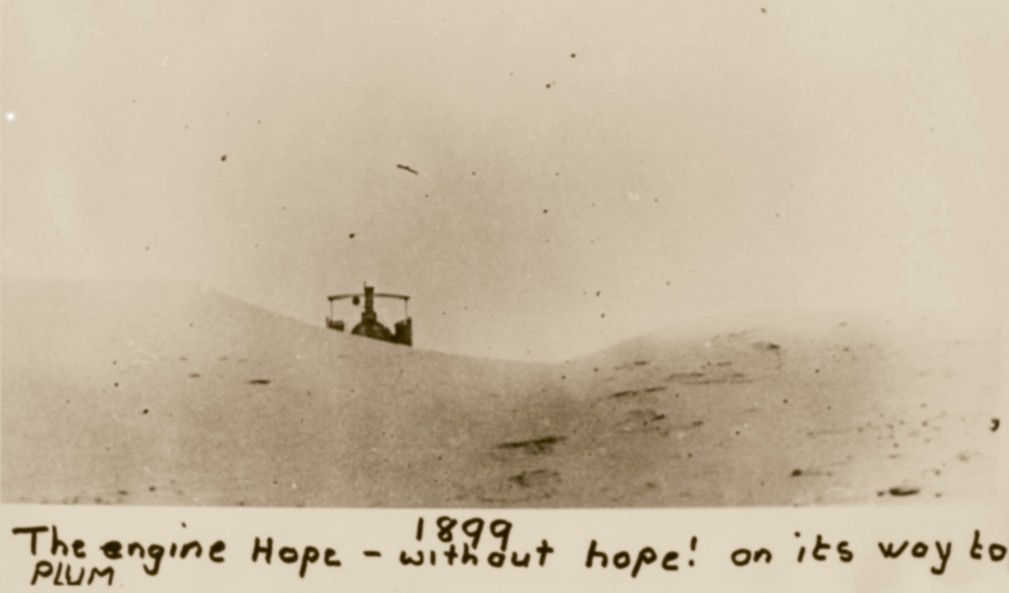
Hope on the way to Plum, c. 1899

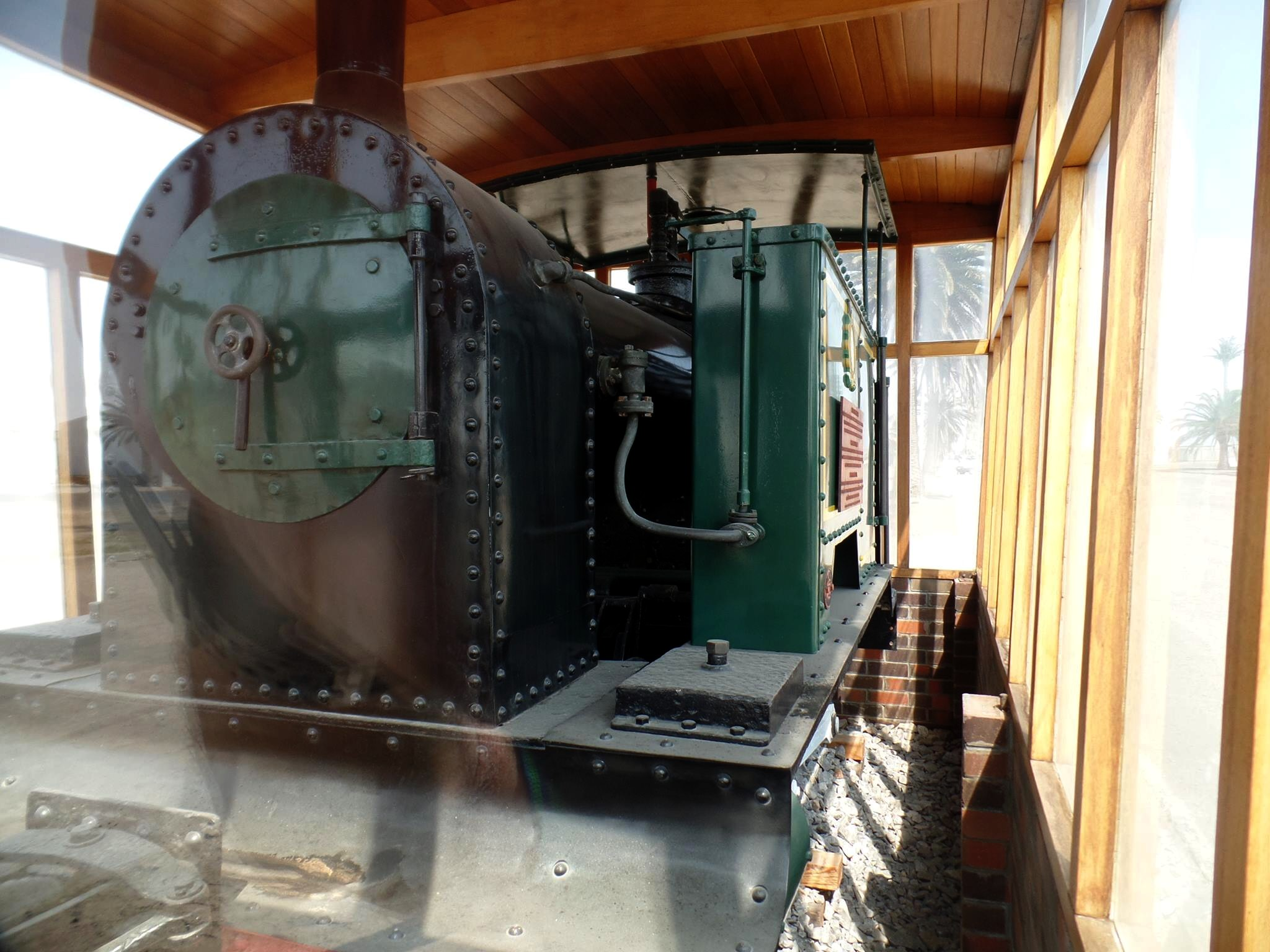
Hope plinthed in a glass cage at Walvis Bay, 2016

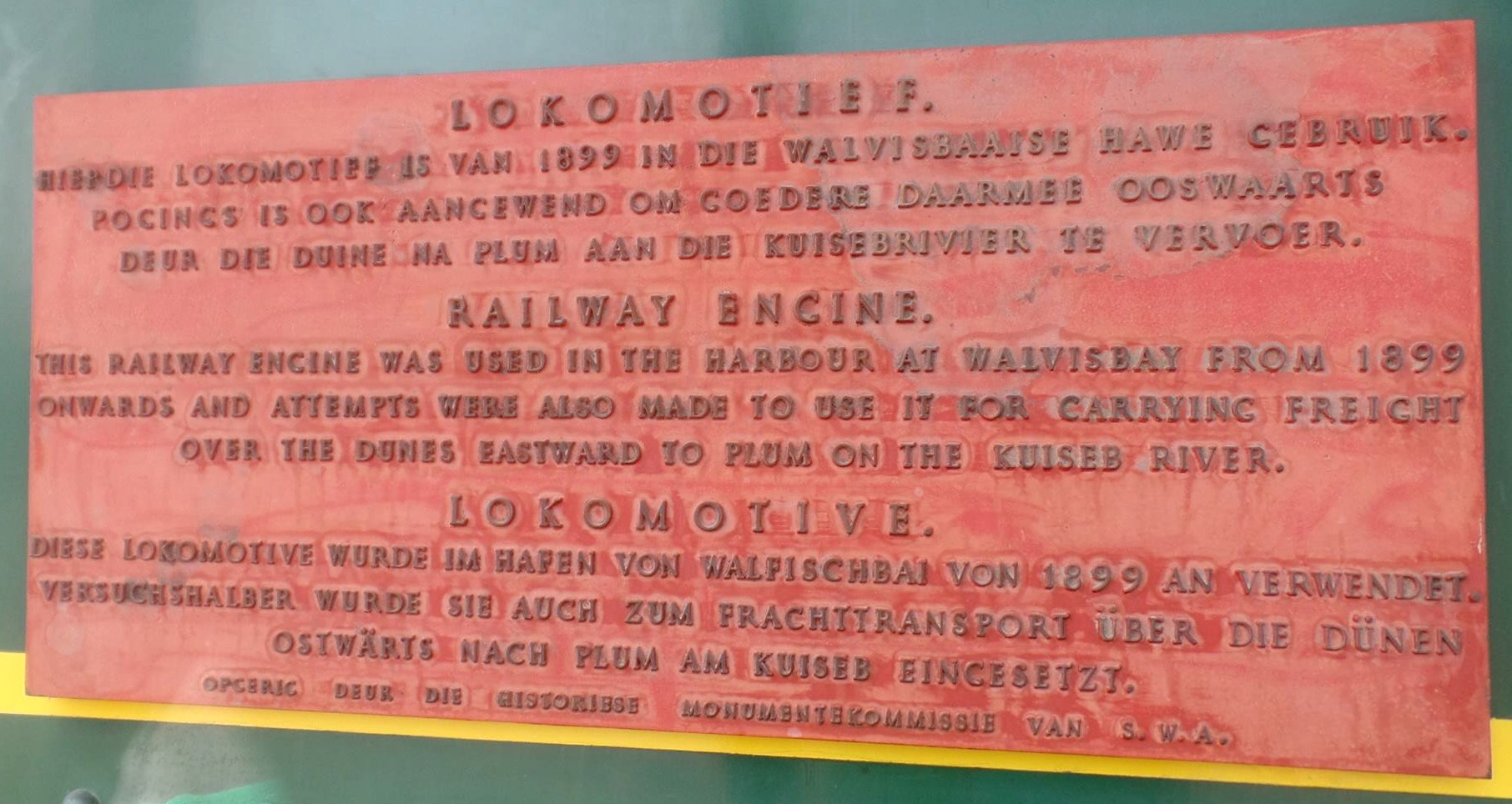
Plaque on Hope in Afrikaans, English and German, Walvis Bay, 2016
