= Mylett =

Mylett is a surname. Notable people with the surname include:

- Jeffrey Mylett (1949–1986), American actor and songwriter
- Michelle Mylett (born 1989), Canadian actress
- Rose Mylett (died 1888), English murder victim

== See also ==
- Mylett Road Section, geographical feature in Wales
- Mynett, surname
