= Ted Mynett =

Railwayman

Edward Charles Mynett
- Born: 1900; Essex, UK
- Died: March 1961; Essex, UK
- Occupation: railwayman

Edward Charles Mynett was a railwayman who worked on the Corringham Light Railway in Essex, England.

== Biography ==
Mynett was born in 1900. His father was Charles Mynett, a longtime employee of Kynoch Limited, which in the late 1890s had built the explosive works and associated village then known as Kynochtown (later Coryton Refinery after the 1920s). The Corringham Light Railway followed, opening in 1901. Mynett began working on the line in around 1925, initially as a fireman. He later became a driver and shunter on the railway's steam-hauled passenger services, which ran between Corringham and Coryton only.

By the time Mynett began working on the line, the CLR no longer had conductors on its trains (the only rolling stock on which this was possible had gone out of use in the 1910s). Mynett therefore also had the job of issuing, checking and taking tickets. It is recorded that the ticket stock and takings were kept in his pocket, and the money in 'an old blue handkerchief tied in a knot' Enthusiasts only began visiting the CLR in the large numbers in the postwar years, and Mynett features in many photographs taken during this period

After Mobil purchased the oil refinery in 1950, the passenger services were discontinued two years later. Mynett drove the last passenger service on the CLR on 1 March 1952, collecting the tickets from the last passengers. With Him on the train was fireman/shunter Clarrie Ockenden. After the cessation of the passenger service, Mynett transferred to the Mobil Maintenance Division. He died in March 1961.

== Recollections ==
Because information on many aspects of the history of the CLR is either scant or absent, the recollections of people such as Mynett are of significance to the historical record. An example of this is that whilst the rather sketchily-known 'toastrack' type coaches which worked on the line in its formative years always appear in photographs without protection from the elements, Mynett recalled from travelling in them as a child that they had latterly been fitted with curtains.
