= 2-4-2 =

Locomotive wheel arrangement

2-4-2 (Columbia)

- A Baldwin 2-4-2T locomotive, used on a private railway in Raahe, Finland. It was later bought by Finnish State Railways.
Equivalent classifications
- UIC class: 1B1, 1'B1'
- French class: 121
- Turkish class: 24
- Swiss class: 2/4
- Russian class: 1-2-1
First known tank engine version
- First use: 1863
- Country: United Kingdom
- Locomotive: No. 21 White Raven
- Railway: St Helens Railway
- Designer: James Cross
- Builder: Sutton Works
First known tender engine version
- First use: 1877
- Country: New Zealand
- Locomotive: K class
- Railway: New Zealand Railways
- Builder: Rogers Locomotive Works

Under the Whyte notation for the classification of steam locomotives, 2-4-2 represents the wheel arrangement of two leading wheels on one axle, four powered and coupled driving wheels on two axles and two trailing wheels on one axle. The type is sometimes named Columbia after a Baldwin 2-4-2 locomotive was showcased at the 1893 World's Columbian Exposition held at Chicago, Illinois.

== Overview ==
The wheel arrangement was widely used on passenger tank locomotives during the last three decades of the nineteenth and the first decade of the twentieth centuries. The vast majority of 2-4-2 locomotives were tank engines, designated 2-4-2T. The symmetrical wheel arrangement was well suited for a tank locomotive that is used to work in either direction.

When the leading and trailing wheels are in swivelling trucks, the equivalent UIC classification is 1'B1'.

While a number of 2-4-2 tender locomotives were built, larger tender locomotive types soon became dominant.

== Usage ==
=== Cape of Good Hope ===
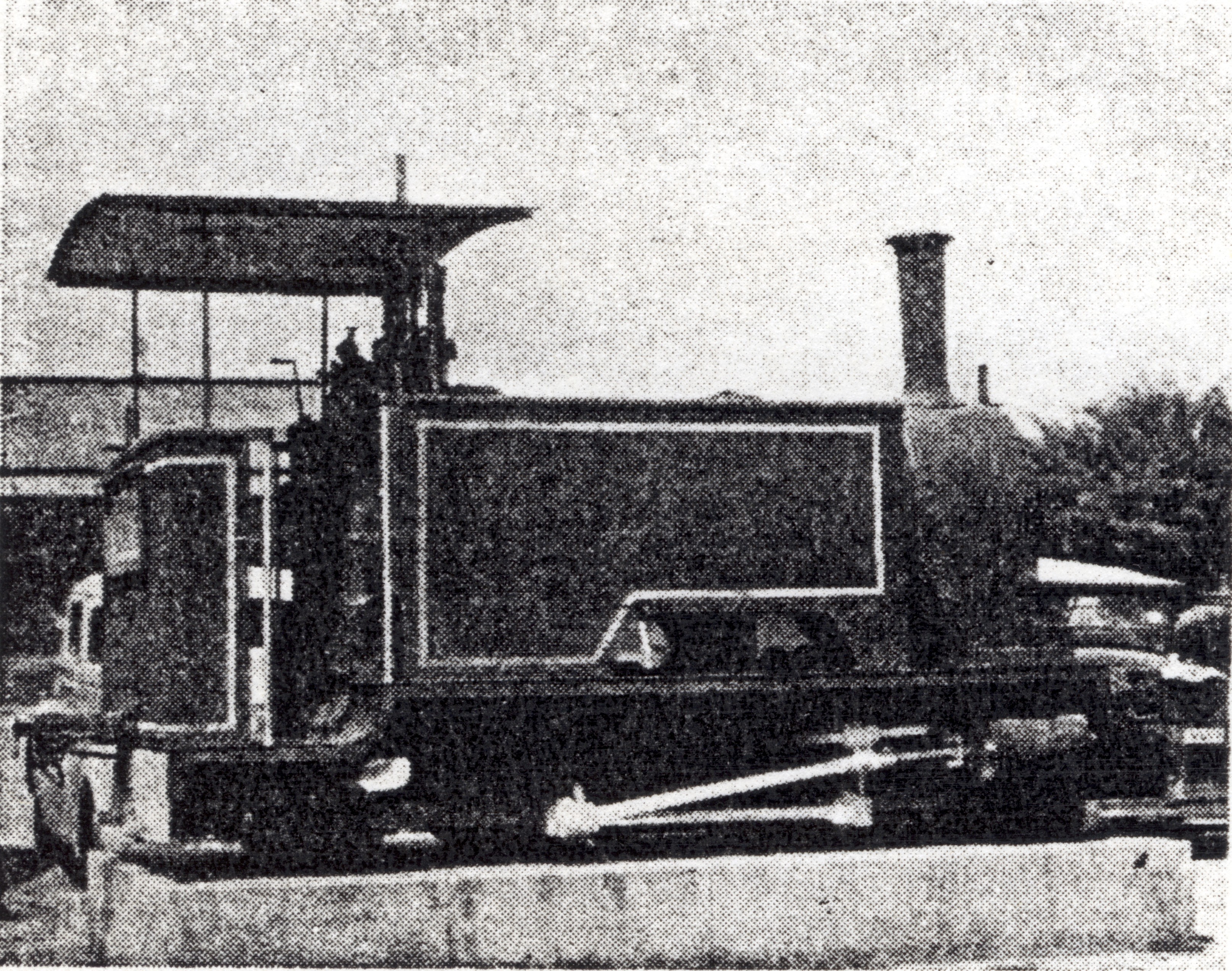
The engine Hope, c. 1948

In 1899, the Walvis Bay Railway in the British territory of Walvis Bay, a Cape of Good Hope exclave in Deutsch-Südwest-Afrika (German South West Africa), placed a single tank locomotive in service. The engine, named Hope and built by Kerr, Stuart and Company, remained in service until 1904 when operations on the railway were suspended. The line was abandoned in 1905, partly as a result of being buried by a sandstorm.

=== Finland ===
A 2-4-2 tank locomotive, built by Baldwin Locomotive Works in 1899 and used on the private Raahe track in Finland, was later bought by the Finnish State Railways.

=== New Zealand ===
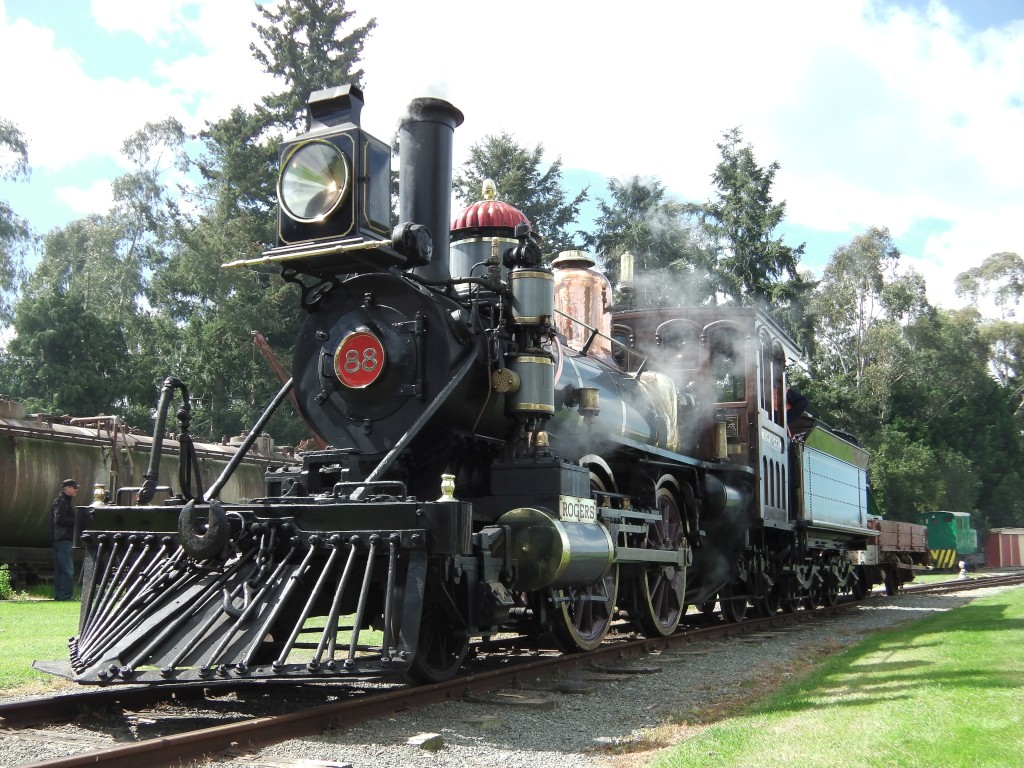
K class no. K88 Washington

In 1877, when the New Zealand Railways needed new motive power, the road turned to the Rogers Locomotive Works who supplied eight 2-4-2 tender locomotives between 1877 and 1879 that were designated the "K" class. These were the first American-built locomotives in New Zealand and proved to be quite successful.

Three of these locomotives have been preserved. No. K88 Washington was used on the first through train between Christchurch and Dunedin in 1877. After fifty years of service, Washington was dumped in the Oreti River, Southland, as a flood protection measure. In 1974, the locomotive was exhumed from her watery grave and, over the next eight years, restored to full active service.

Sister locomotives numbers K92 and K94 have also been salvaged from the Oreti river. No. K92 has been restored to full active service and has re-established her position on the Kingston Flyer train, which was made famous by the K class at the end of the 19th century.

=== United Kingdom ===
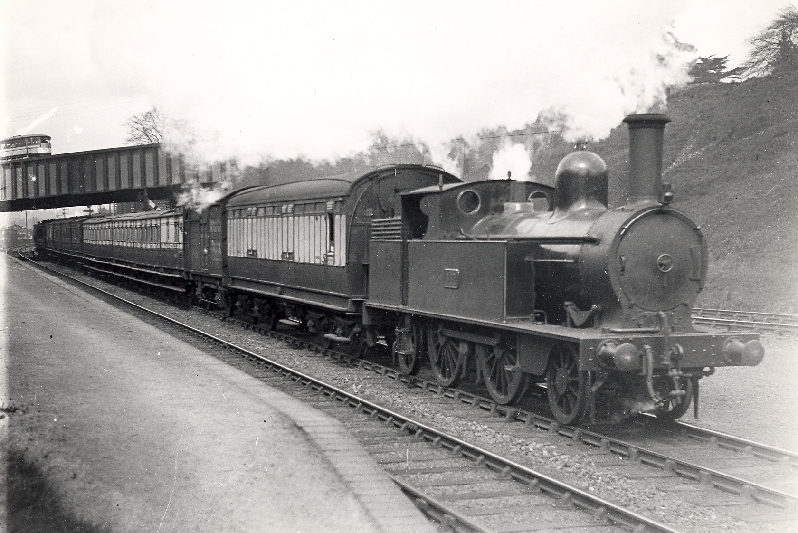
London and North Western Railway 2-4-2T

The earliest British use of the 2-4-2 wheel arrangement appears to have been no. 21 White Raven, supplied to the St Helens Railway by James Cross of Sutton Works in 1863. It was soon rebuilt as a 2-4-0 tender locomotive and eventually passed into the stock of the London and North Western Railway (L&NWR).

In 1864, Robert Sinclair of the Great Eastern Railway designed the first of six 2-4-2 tank classes built by the railway, eventually totalling 262 locomotives by 1912.

Francis Webb of the London and North Western Railway also designed two 2-4-2 classes which eventually totaled 380 locomotives, built between 1879 and 1898.

Other railway companies that built large numbers of the type included the Lancashire and Yorkshire Railway (L&YR) with 330 locomotives built between 1889 and 1911, the North Eastern Railway with 60 locomotives built between 1886 and 1892 and the Manchester, Sheffield and Lincolnshire Railway with 49 locomotives built between 1889 and 1898. One of John Aspinall's Class 5 locomotives, built for the L&YR in 1889, is preserved at the National Railway Museum, York.

=== United States ===
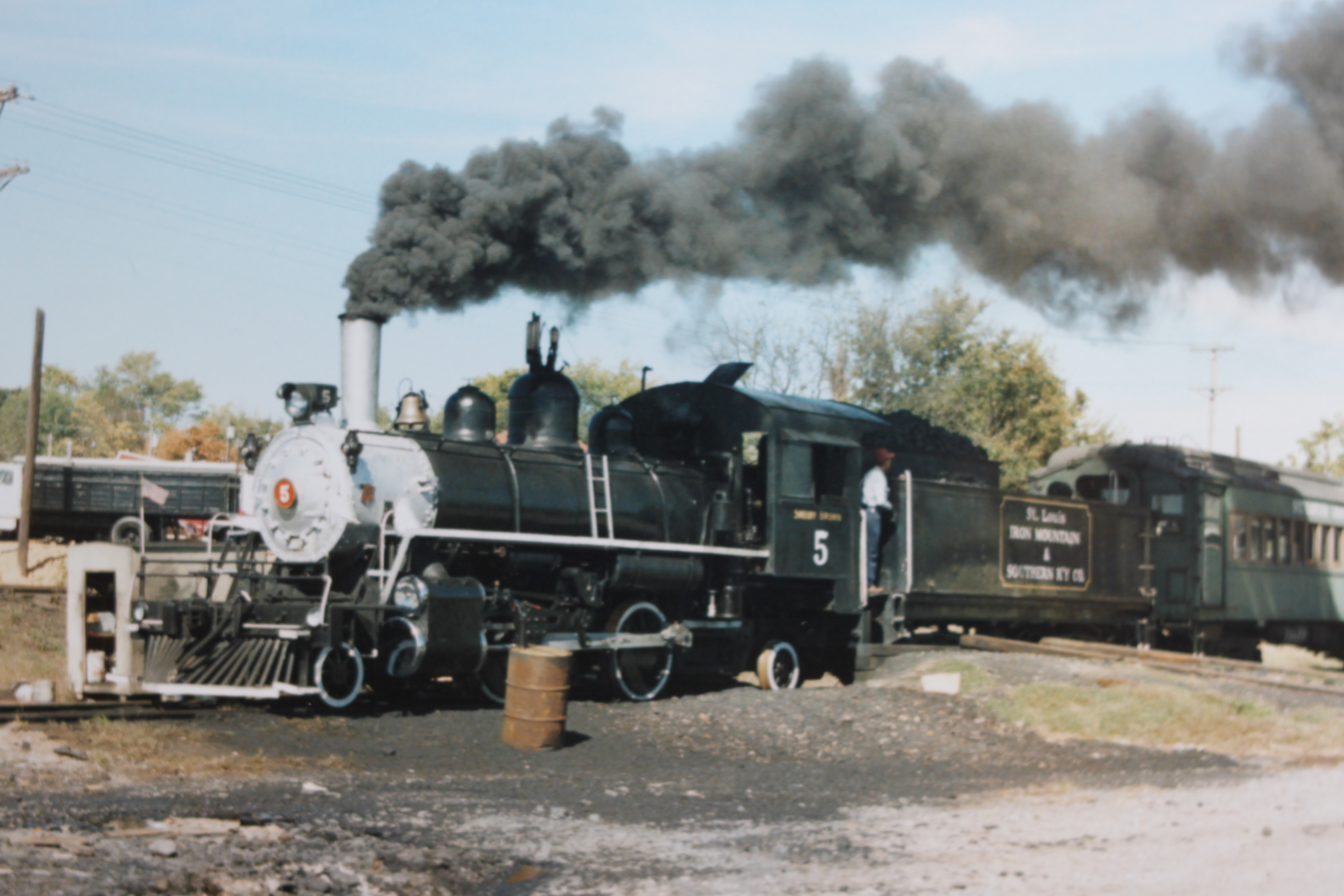
St. Louis, Iron Mountain and Southern Railway 5 was built as a 2-4-2T, but it was later modified as a tender engine by the Crab Orchard and Egyptian Railway.

The tank-type 2-4-2T was common in the U.S. around the dawn of the twentieth century in both suburban passenger service and on logging railroads. The Baldwin Locomotive Works built a demonstrator tender type engine which was displayed at the Columbian Exposition of 1893, leading to the type's name. This locomotive featured ambitious seven foot tall driving wheels, and was one of the first tender-equipped locomotives with a trailing truck. This freed the firebox from having to sit narrowly between, or above, the drive wheels, and was a very influential design.

This inspired three major U.S. railroads (Atlantic Coast Line, Burlington and Reading) to purchase a few of the type. But the two-wheeled lead truck was never well-suited to high speed service on far-flung North American rails. Some were converted to 4-4-2 Atlantic types and others were converted to 4-6-0 Ten Wheelers. The display locomotive was donated to Columbia University. In one respect, however, it was a success. A great many Atlantic types would follow, most based on the design.

== Model railroading ==
The Lionel Corporation used the 2-4-2 configuration in many of its O-27 locomotives. In the United States, this may be the most famous usage of a 2-4-2 configuration locomotive.
