= Walvis Bay railway station =

Railway station in Namibia

Coordinates: 22.9541°S 14.501°E

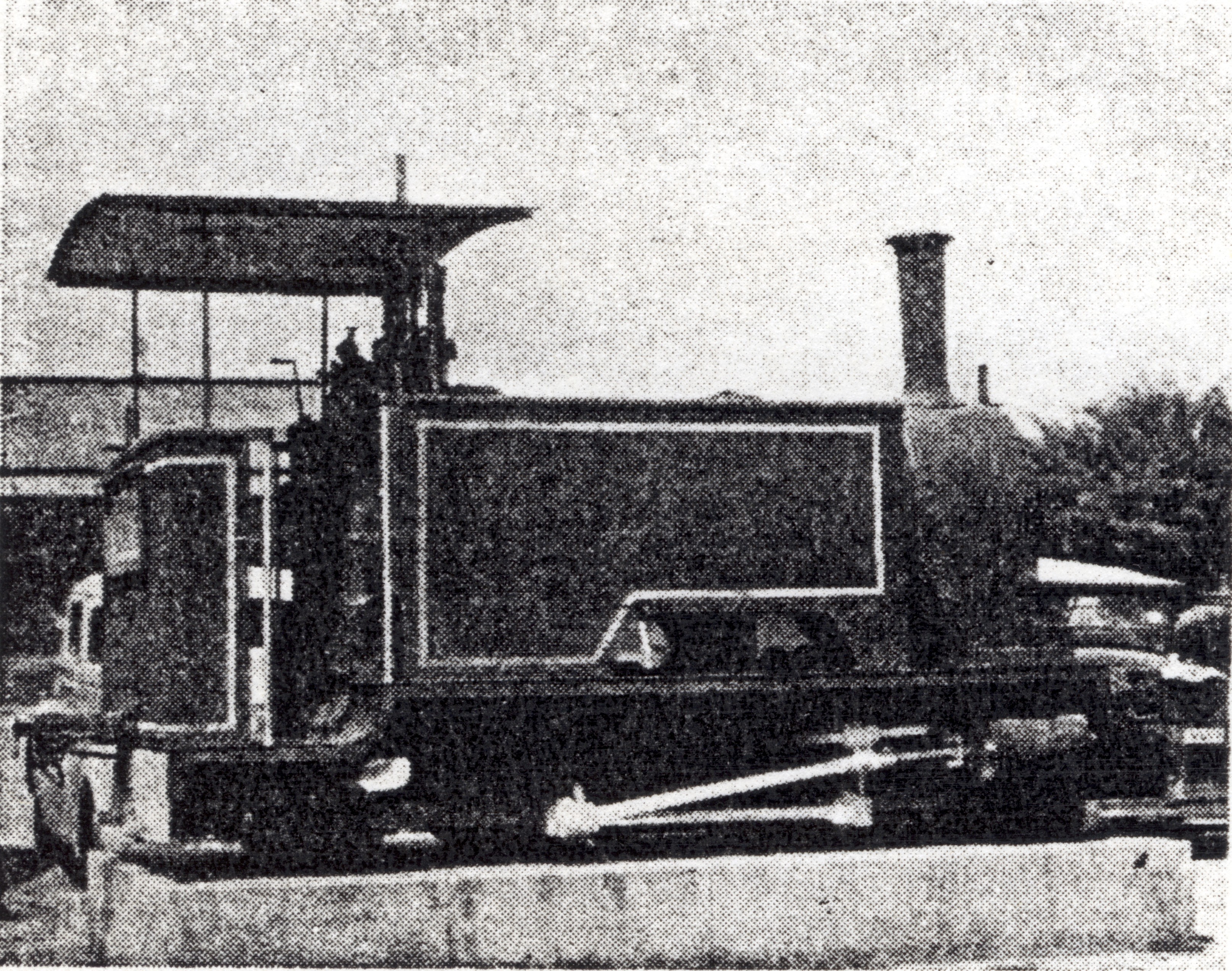
The engine Hope, plinthed at the station, c. 1948

Walvis Bay railway station is a railway station serving the port city of Walvis Bay in Namibia. It is part of the TransNamib railway network.

== Overview ==
The first state railway line in German South West Africa was the connection between Swakopmund and Windhoek, built in 1902 during Imperial Germany's colonial rule. In 1914 this line was extended to Walvis Bay, with a railtrack very close to the shore of the Atlantic Ocean. In 1980 the extension was replaced by an alternative route behind the dunes that allowed for higher axle load.

== See also ==
- Rail transport in Namibia
