= Minet (surname) =

Minet is a surname, and may refer to:

- Bernard Minet (born 1953), French singer and actor
- Elissa Minet Fuchs (1919–2023), American ballerina
- Pierre Minet (1909–1975), French poet
- William Minet (1851–1933), British landowner and philanthropist
