= Corringham Light Railway =

Railway in Essex, England

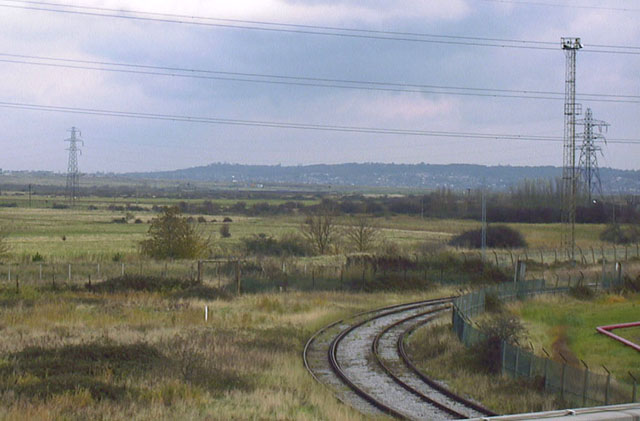
- The site of the junction between lines to Corringham (lifted) on the left, Kynochtown (later Corytown) on the right and Thames Haven in the foreground.

Overview
- Locale: Corringham, Essex
- Dates of operation: 10 July 1899–20 September 1971
- Successor: Mobil Oil

Technical
- Track gauge: 4 ft 8 1/2 in (1,435 mm)
- Length: 3 1/2 Miles

The Corringham Light Railway (CLR) in Corringham, Essex, England was incorporated by the Corringham Light Railway Order 1899 on 10 July 1899 and opened to freight on 1 January 1901, to passengers on 22 June 1901. It closed to passengers on 1 March 1952 and was absorbed into the Mobil Oil Company on 20 September 1971. The railway itself went from an end on junction with the London Tilbury and Southend Railway at Thames Haven to both Corringham and Kynochtown (later Coryton).

== Overview ==
The London, Tilbury and Southend Railway (LTSR) had a branch from Thames Haven Junction, near Stanford-le-Hope, to Thames Haven on the Thames Estuary. It was some 2 3/4 miles (4.4 km) long. There was a passenger station at Thames Haven but it closed before the CLR opened.

The CLR ran from a junction with the LTSR near Thames Haven to the Kynoch explosives works at Shell Haven, with branches east to Kynochtown (later Coryton) and west to Corringham.

Corringham Station on the Fobbing Road was a substantial brick-built structure providing both male and female toilets, a bicycle shed and a small loading platform. Although the light railway order included a siding this was never laid. From the station the line headed down hill past two sidings, The first branched off towards a small brickworks and the second to a sewage works. Both were closed and removed before 1923. At the bottom of the incline the line crossed a bridge before heading across the marshes towards the works/LTSR it crossed the A1014 Manorway for the first time at Ironlatch crossing before heading straight for around a mile. At this point the line divided into a triangular junction with the LTSR and to Kynochtown/Coryton. The station at Kynochtown/Coryton was built in a similar style to Corringham but was built from wood. Originally the station was on a dead-end siding meaning that a train, once loaded, would have to reverse out to allow the locomotive pass to the front of the train.

On 20 September 1971 the CLR company became part of the Mobil Oil Company, serving its Coryton Refinery.

== Closure and remains ==
After the refinery transferred to Vacuum Oil Company, later Mobil, improvements were made to the branch that entered the refinery. The last passenger train ran from Corringham station on Saturday 1 March 1952 at 12.20pm. By 12 April of that year, Corringham station and branch were noted as having been demolished.

The site of the station on Fobbing Road is apparent from the satellite view of postcode SS17 9DB. The trees that lined the track as it ran north and curved westward into the station are still present. The top end of the trackbed up to public footpath 22 including the platform and loop was sold to a housing developer in 1986 The rear of the station site (behind the platform) became The Hawthorns estate: the rear of the brick platform is visible from The Hawthorns, behind "Station House" on the right. A series of fishponds now lie on the trackbed through the station site. The gate post on Fobbing Road at the entrance to the station is still there, just across the road from Kynoch Villas and Digby Road.

Along the track bed there are various earth works and remaining structures, the first of which is the sewage works that once served the works colony (originally served by its own siding), The second of which are the large ponds in the grounds of the Pegasus club, these are the remains of the once rail served brick works. Finally there are the remains of Brickfield Bridge over Fobbing Creek.

At the site of Coryton Station the 1919 brick platform extension survives within the refinery and was restored cosmetically by BP in 1985 however the wooden waiting shelter/toilets have long since disappeared . Coryton station is an anomaly as usually a station is demolished when its railway closes, however the whole village of Coryton was demolished in the 1970s while leaving the station as intact as it was when the last trains ran.

Various items have survived in private hands, mainly tickets and photographs. A brick from Corringham station was rescued by an enthusiast and was subsequently incorporated into the wall of his home office. A fishplate was discovered in June 2013 after recent ploughing had uncovered it. One piece of rolling stock was also almost preserved: the final LTSR carriage was donated in the 1970s to Railway Vehicle Preservations, who are now based on the Great Central Railway. Unfortunately it was later destroyed by fire, though one door survived in a private collection. The door was restored as far as was practical and in 2012 was donated to the East Anglian Railway Museum where it now features in the Carriage and Wagon display.

== Locomotives ==
Name	Builder and Class	Configuration	Works Number	Build Date	Date Acquired	Livery	Notes
Cordite	Kitson	0-4-0WT	T109	1884	1900	Unknown, possibly unlined red.	Withdrawn c. 1914 Scrapped by 1935
Kynite	Kerr Stuart Waterloo class	0-4-2T	692	1901	1901	Red, lining in black and yellow	Withdrawn c. 1919 Scrapped 1952
Cordite	Kerr Stuart Huxley class	0-4-0ST	1283	1915	1915	Grey	Transferred c. 1919 Scrapped 1954
Unnamed (known as the 1917 loco)	Avonside B3 class	0-6-0ST	1771 (CLR Number 2)	1917	1917	Red/brown, lining in black and gold. Later scarlet	Withdrawn c. 1956 Scrapped 1957
Unnamed (known as the 1914 loco)	Avonside B3 class	0-6-0ST	1672 (CLR Number 1)	1914	1933	Green or blue	Withdrawn c. 1955 Scrapped 1957

- 0-4-0WT Cordite is referred to in some literature as Major or Cordite Major. It had been built for the West Lancashire Railway, and was re-plated in 1893, leading some older sources to give this as the build-date.
- 0-4-2T Kynite, after being withdrawn during or just after World War I, was last steamed to provide steam in conjunction with building works at Cory's in C1922/23. 'Kynite' was the name of an explosive devised by Kynochs in the 1890s.
- 0-4-0ST Cordite, after leaving the CLR, was transferred to another of Kynochs' properties at Witton, which was later the property of Imperial Chemicals (ICI). A photograph dating from its time at Witton shows it with the number 2, leading some sources to speculate that it may have been so numbered on the CLR.
- 0-6-0ST 1, was formerly from the War Department at Shoeburyness. Some sources refer to it as being numbered 1, though there are no photographs showing this loco numbered. It had already been out of service prior to scrapping, with a condemned firebox.

After the steam locomotives were scrapped the line was worked with diesel locomotives owned by Mobil Oil. However, there is no evidence that internal combustion locomotives ever ventured on to the Corringham branch before it was taken up in the 1950s.

Kynite was scrapped by T Ward and sons of Grays and the two Avonside locomotives were scrapped by Ray of Southend.

Although no steam locomotive that ran on the Corringham Light Railway was preserved, the National Railway Museum has the works plate from Kynite on display in the works display and also owns a fine example of the Avonside B4 class (same as locomotives 2 and 1) in "Woolmer" Works No 1572 of 1910, currently on display at the Milestones Museum in Basingstoke. This, as CLR No 1, has a military origin, having run on the Longmoor Military Railway in Hampshire.

== Rolling stock ==
Description	Quantity	Builder	Build Date	Date Acquired	Notes
Toastrack bogie coaches (see below)	2	Kerr Stuart / Hudson	1900	1900	Out of use c1915. Probably scrapped 1920s.
4-wheeled coach	1	Unknown / possibly either Ltsr / GER	1876?	1901/2	similar to later 4-wheelers. May have survived beyond 1930.
4-wheeled coaches	3?	LT&SR	1876	1915	All but two scrapped by 1930. Only one was used by late 1940s.
Bogie coaches	8?	Midland	1882	C1915	At least one still in use 1926/27. All scrapped by 1930

For the opening two "toastrack" carriages were supplied by Kerr Stuart, a 1st/3rd composite with the 1st class area enclosed and a 3rd class all open, described as very modern and akin to the trams on Southend pier at the time. Initially only one carriage was used at a time as the Kitson locomotive was unable to draw two loaded carriages up the incline to Corringham. Later the composite carriage was fully enclosed and curtains were added to the 3rd class carriage because of the harsh weather on the marshes. By 1905 by a four-wheel 3rd class carriage of LTSR origin was added.

They were modified by the removal of the compartment partitions and the addition of a handbrake at one end acting on one wheel set. During the First World War three bogie carriages of Midland Railway origin were acquired due to a further influx in staff to Thames works, In addition several more four wheel carriages where acquired from the LTSR. From the 1920s the passenger stock was reduced with the scrapping of many of the carriages acquired during the World War I, It was noted that at least one of the bogie carriages continued to be used past this time. Towards the end of the passenger service on the railway one or two ex-LTSR four-wheel carriages continued to be used, as noted on a Stephenson Locomotive Society visit in 1948.

Freight stock varied between two and 14 wagons. Little is known about them, but there is photographic evidence of two four-wheel wagons, one regularly at Corringham and an ex LBSCR open wagon. There are many photographs from the later years of the CLR that show wagons belonging to Cory Brothers in use or dumped in derelict condition. However these do not appear to have ever been owned by the railway itself.

== Staff ==
Although the CLR had directors and several secretaries over the years, it listed very few staff on its books. Kynochs (and later Cory's) kept costs down to a minimum by counting only the locomotive crews (ie the drivers and firemen) as actual employees of the CLR. Like many aspects of the CLR, not much has been recorded of them.

Name	Position	Dates	Notes
Tom Johnstone	Driver	1900s-c1939	Listed as a stationary engine driver in 1901. Lived in Fleet Street, Coryton in the 1930s.
Arthur Baker	Driver	1900s-1930s	Lived in Fleet Street, Coryton in the 1930s.
Frederick D'Aumont	Fireman	?	Lived in Fleet Street, Coryton in the 1930s.
Ted Mynett	Fireman, later driver	c1925-1952	Transferred to Mobil maintenance division after passenger services ended.
William Newman	Fireman	c1940s	
Clarrie Ockendon	Fireman	c1940-1950s	
G. Garland	Driver	c1949-1963	
Albert Everard	Driver	c1960s	
Alan Segasby	Driver	c1960s	
Stan Edwards	Shunter	c1960s	
George Martin	Shunter	c1960s	
Paul Clark	Shunter	c1960s	

Later staff were direct employees of Mobil.

== Corringham Light Railway Society ==
The Corringham Light Railway Project was founded in 2013 by a group of local people attempting to save the remaining trackbed of the Corringham Light Railway. Unfortunately time has not been kind to what remains of the Corringham Light Railway. In December 2014 the Corringham Light Railway Society was formed by former members of the project it now aims to research and discover as much as possible about the old line and if possible assist in the preservation of any remaining artifacts.

The society's secondary aims are to preserve the general railway history of the Thurrock area in conjunction with other groups.
