= Minnett =

Minnett is a surname. Notable people with the surname include:

- Cora Minnett (born 1868), Australian author and actress
- Harry Clive Minnett (1917–2003), Australian astronomer
- Leslie Minnett (1883–1934), Australian cricketer
- Roy Minnett (1888–1955), Australian cricketer, brother of Leslie and Rupert, later a doctor
- Rupert Minnett (1884–1974), Australian architect and cricketer
