= Pontarddulais railway station =

Railway station in Swansea, Wales

Pontarddulais
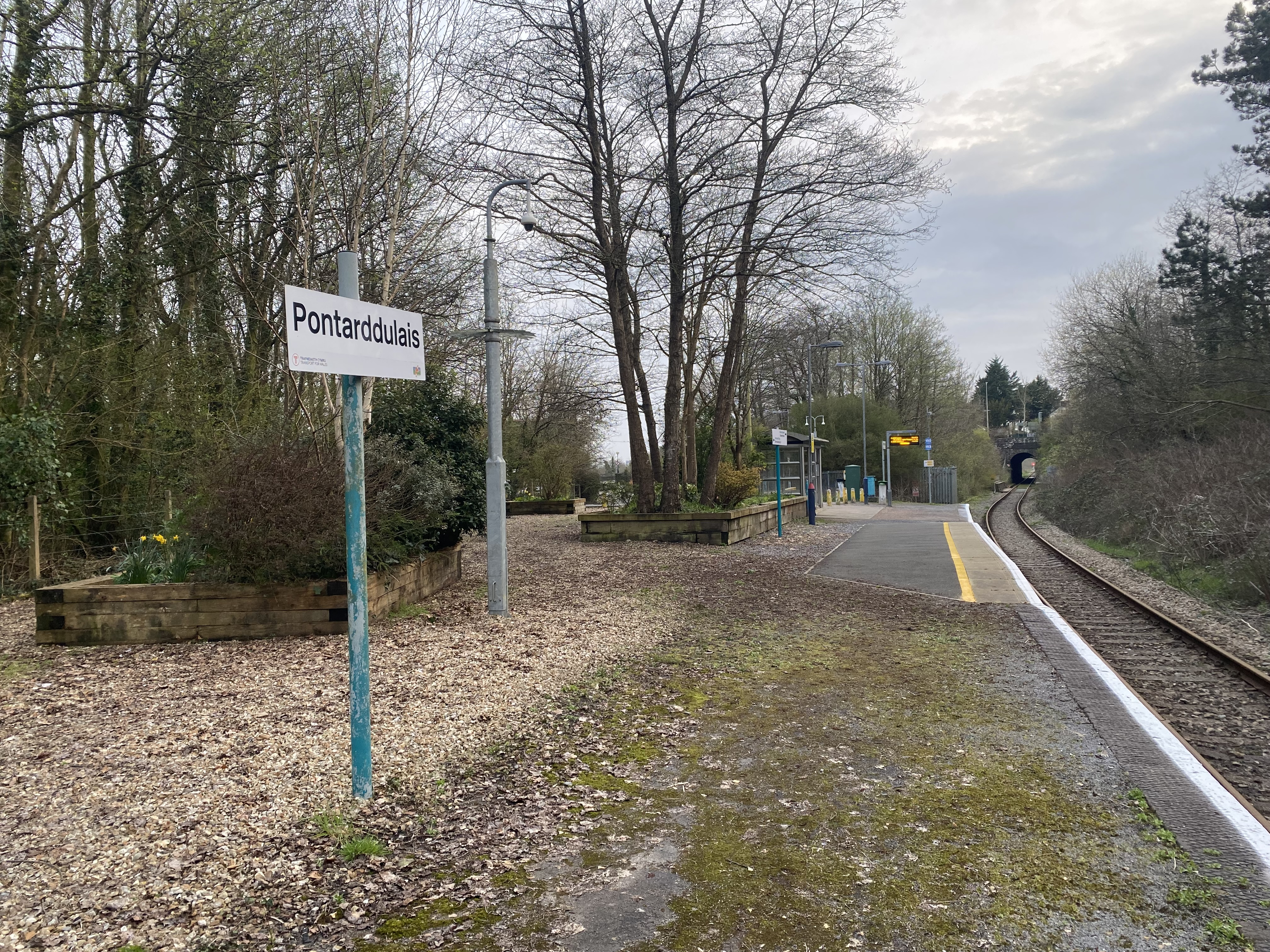
- Pontarddulais railway station in 2017

General information
- Location: Pontarddulais, Swansea; Wales
- Coordinates: 51.7170°N 4.0454°W
- Grid reference: SN587040
- Manager: Transport for Wales
- Platforms: 1

Other information
- Station code: PTD
- Classification: DfT category F2

History
- Opened: 1840

Passengers
- 2021/22: ▲2,068
- 2022/23: ▲3,180
- 2023/24: ▲4,088
- 2024/25: ▲6,412
- 2025/26: ▲6,554
Location
Notes
- Passenger statistics from the Office of Rail and Road

Pontarddulais railway station serves the town of Pontarddulais and village of Hendy in Swansea, Wales. The station is located at street level not far from the town centre and the Loughor estuary. All trains serving the station are operated by Transport for Wales.

== History ==
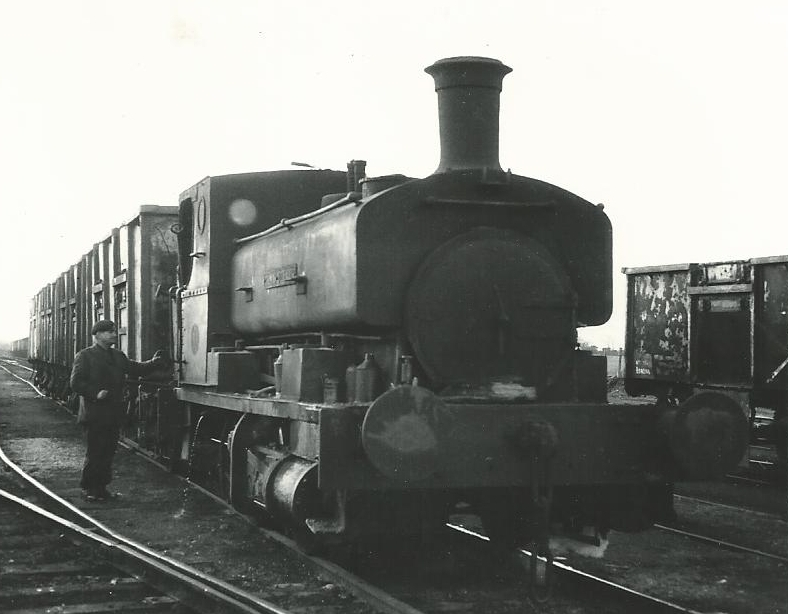
1907 Barclay 0-4-0ST, No.1119 NCB "Glan Dulais" of the National Coal Board, shunting empty 21 ton coal wagons at Graig Merthyr Sidings, before heading off to Graig Merthyr Colliery. March 1969

Before the arrival of the railway, due to the local rivers, Pontarddulais was already a noted local industrialised town, with two mills and two factories in existence, alongside home-based woollen looms.

The station was built in 1840 on the original Llanelly Railway (LR) main line, from Llanelli to Llandovery. There a direct connection was made with the Central Wales Railway, which along with other lines was controlled by the London and North Western Railway (LNWR), enabling the LNWR to connect the South Wales coast with industrialised Northwest England, via Craven Arms, Shrewsbury and Crewe.

In 1868, the LR made the mistake of not renewing its right to the lease of the Vale of Towy. The LNWR subsequently negotiated a track-access agreement with the LR, enabling it to gain running powers to Llandeilo, which helped the LNWR's strategic plan to reach the South Wales coast and hence break into Great Western Railway (GWR) territory. The completed Central Wales line was opened in June 1868.

=== LNWR dispute, and junction development ===
From 1 July 1871, the LNWR was granted by the LR running-rights onwards into Llanelli. This enabled the LNWR to then reverse its trains at Llanelli, and run under agreement with the GWR into Swansea via the South Wales Main Line.

However, the LR and LNWR ran into a legal dispute over payments, and eventually the LR approached the House of Lords to cancel the agreement. The LNWR counter-sued by proposing taking over the entire LR line, arguing that the "success" of the LR was only to be found in the development of the Central Wales route. The House of Lords agreed with the LNWR, and a subsequent 1873 an Act of Parliament authorised the Llandeilo to Carmarthen and Llandeilo to Swansea sections of the LR to become a separate company, to be called the Swansea and Carmarthen Railway. Subsequently, transferred to the LNWR, they amalgamated the line into a new company called the Central Wales and Carmarthen Junction Railway, with the LR retaining running powers over its own ex-mainline.

Now reverted and restricted to its original Llanelli to Llandovery route, from 1 January 1873 the GWR took over the operation of the remaining LR section, running passenger trains to Llandovery as a branch from Llanelli - an arrangement which continued until 1964 when the steam hauled services ended. The LNWR wanted direct running access rights into Swansea Docks, and hence began construction of direct line via the Gower peninsula. This direct line opened in 1866/7 and terminated for passengers at Swansea Victoria, turning the original station at Pontarddulais into a junction with four platforms.

=== Industrial period: 1850s-1950s ===
With better connections and an ample supply of natural resources, from the mid-1800s the town became highly industrialised, through both the extraction of coal, but mainly the development of various competing tinplate works. By 1910 there were six works across the area, with workers coming from as far away as Italy, resulting in the GWR connecting its freight bypass route the Swansea District Line just to the south of Pontarddulais in 1912.

The entire line was taken over by the Western Region of British Railways post-Nationalisation in 1946, although the LNWR influence remained through the hauling of Crewe-Swansea through trains wholly by LMS locomotives, especially the LMS Black 5. In the 1950s, new large-scale tinplate works were established in nearby Trostre and Felindre, rendering the old works in Pontarddulais obsolete. This brought about a huge reduction in both the size of the town, and consequently of passenger and freight traffic through the station.

The LNWR's direct Swansea Victoria line along the Mumbles peninsula fell victim to the Beeching Axe in June 1964, and its bridge just south of Pontarddulais was removed in 1974 to allow construction of the M4 Motorway westwards. All trains now reach Swansea via Llanelli, with the trackless platforms of the direct line still in place but heavily overgrown.

The 80-yd (72 m) long tunnel immediately south of the station is the oldest surviving rail tunnel still in use in Wales, having originally being built for horse tramway use around 1839 and subsequently converted for the standard gauge railway link to Llandeilo. Slab track was laid through it in 1984 to resolve long-standing issues with flooding & poor drainage there.

== Facilities ==
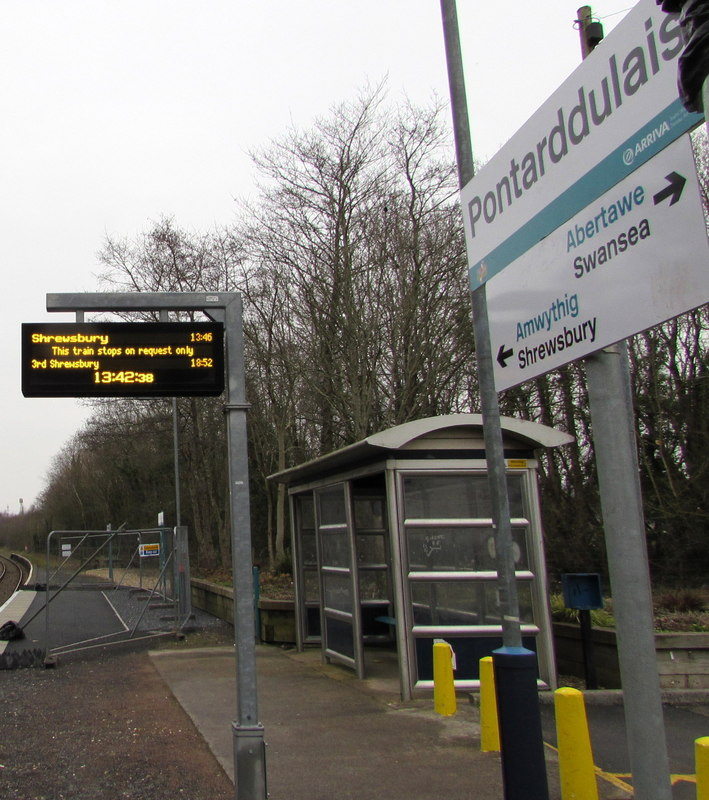
Basic platform facilities (2015)

The station has one remaining active platform, which has had a section raised in 2015 to assist passengers boarding or alighting. This was funded by the Welsh Government.

No ticket machine is available (the station is unstaffed), so these must be purchased on the train or prior to travel. There is a standard plexiglass and metal shelter provided, along with a CIS screen and timetable information board but no other permanent buildings. Level access is available between the car park and platform.

== Services ==
Pontarddulais is a request stop, whereby passengers have to give a hand signal to the approaching train driver to board or notify the guard when they board that they wish to alight from the train there.

There are six trains a day in each direction on weekdays, five on Saturdays and two services on Sundays. Five run through to Shrewsbury northbound, with one more to Llandovery on Monday to Fridays, whilst southbound trains run to Llanelli and Swansea.

Preceding station	National Rail	Following station
Llangennech	Transport for Wales; Heart of Wales Line	Pantyffynnon

== References in popular culture ==
Pontarddulais station was featured in the Channel 4 series Paul Merton's Secret Stations Season 1 Episode 2 broadcast on 8 May 2016. This series features comedian Paul Merton visiting various request stop railway stations around Britain. Former politician Michael Portillo has also visited the station on an episode of the BBC TV documentary series Great British Railway Journeys
