= Afon Brân =

River in mid Wales

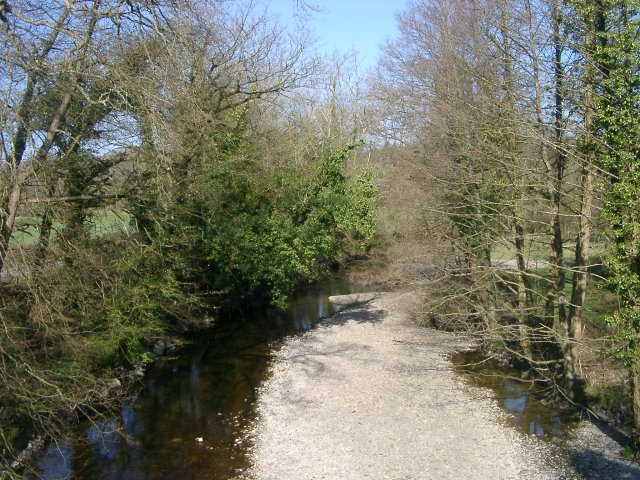
The Afon Brân

The Afon Brân is a tributary of the River Towy (or Welsh Afon Tywi) in mid Wales. Its headwaters rise in Irfon Forest in the northeastern corner of Carmarthenshire as the Cynnant Fawr and Afon Lwynor and the river assumes the name of Afon Brân at their confluence to the north of the village of Cynghordy. Its major tributary is the Afon Gwydderig which joins it at Llandovery. Other tributaries include the Nant Bargod, Cynnant Fach, Afon Gwyddon, Nant Hirgwm, Nant Cwm-neuadd, Bawddwr and Afon Crychan with its own minor tributary the Afon Dulais.

The word 'brân' in Welsh means 'crow', an association which may be allude to the colours of its waters.

Northeastwards from Llandovery the valley of the Afon Brân is followed to just beyond Cynghordy by the Heart of Wales Railway and the A483 road to Llanwrtyd Wells. The modern road follows in part the line of the old Roman Road from the Roman fort at Llanfair Hill (Alabum) which overlooks the river above Llandovery. The railway crosses the Afon Brân by means of the Cynghordy Viaduct, a Victorian structure which is considered one of the finest of its kind in Wales.
