= Heart of Wales Line Trail =

142-mile footpath in Wales and England

- Length: 229 km (142 mi)
- Location: Wales
- Trailheads: Craven Arms Station; 52.442°N 2.838°W; Llanelli Station; 51.674°N 4.161°W
- Use: Hiking
- Season: All year

Heart of Wales Line Trail is a long distance footpath, running 229 kilometres / 142 miles from Craven Arms to Llanelli. It was opened on the 28th of March 2019 following four years of planning. The trail marker is a stylized image of a train crossing the Cynghordy Viaduct.

== The route ==
The trail links nearly all of the stations of the Heart of Wales Line allowing for easy car-free access. Places on the route include Knighton, Builth Wells, Llandovery and Millennium Coastal Park.

In 2023 a charitable incorporated organisation called "The Friends of the Heart of Wales Line Trail" was formed to help promote and support the trail. In May 2024 the organisation released a bilingual website that maps out stations along the trail.
