= Swansea Bay (disambiguation) =

Swansea Bay may refer to the following places in Wales:

- Swansea Bay, on the north of the Bristol Channel
  - Swansea Beach, the stretch of beach lining the Swansea Bay inlet between Swansea Docks and the Mumbles
- Swansea Bay (region), a region of Wales designated by the Welsh Assembly Government for policy planning
- Swansea Bay City Region, a local authority partnership in south-west Wales
- Swansea Bay railway station, a former station

== See also ==
- Swansea Bay Radio, a radio station broadcasting to the Swansea Bay region
- Swansea Bay Film Festival, an annual film festival held in Swansea, Wales
- Swansea Bay Golf Club, a golf club near the village of Jersey Marine, Wales
