= Llandovery railway station =

Railway station in Carmarthenshire, Wales

Llandovery Welsh: Llanymddyfri
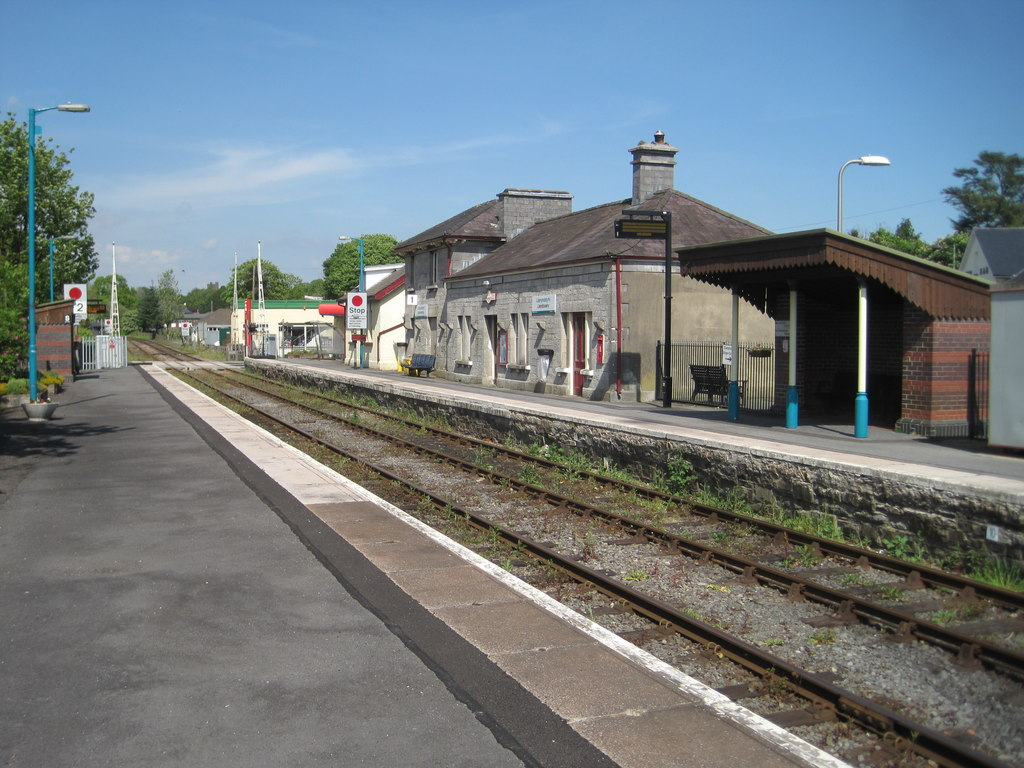

General information
- Location: Llandovery, Carmarthenshire; Wales
- Coordinates: 51.995°N 3.803°W
- Grid reference: SN763345
- Manager: Transport for Wales
- Platforms: 2

Other information
- Station code: LLV
- Classification: DfT category F1

History
- Opened: 1 April 1858

Passengers
- 2021/22: ▲6,656
- 2022/23: ▲9,588
- 2023/24: ▲12,692
- 2024/25: ▲13,702
- 2025/26: ▲14,914

Listed Building – Grade II
- Feature: Llandovery Station
- Designated: 12 March 1996
- Reference no.: 82888
Location
Notes
- Passenger statistics from the Office of Rail and Road

Llandovery railway station serves the market town of Llandovery, Carmarthenshire, Wales. The station is on the Heart of Wales Line, 29 miles 24 chains (47.2 km) from Llandeilo Junction, near Llanelli, and is located between Llanwrda and Cynghordy. All trains are operated by Transport for Wales, who also manage the station.

== History ==
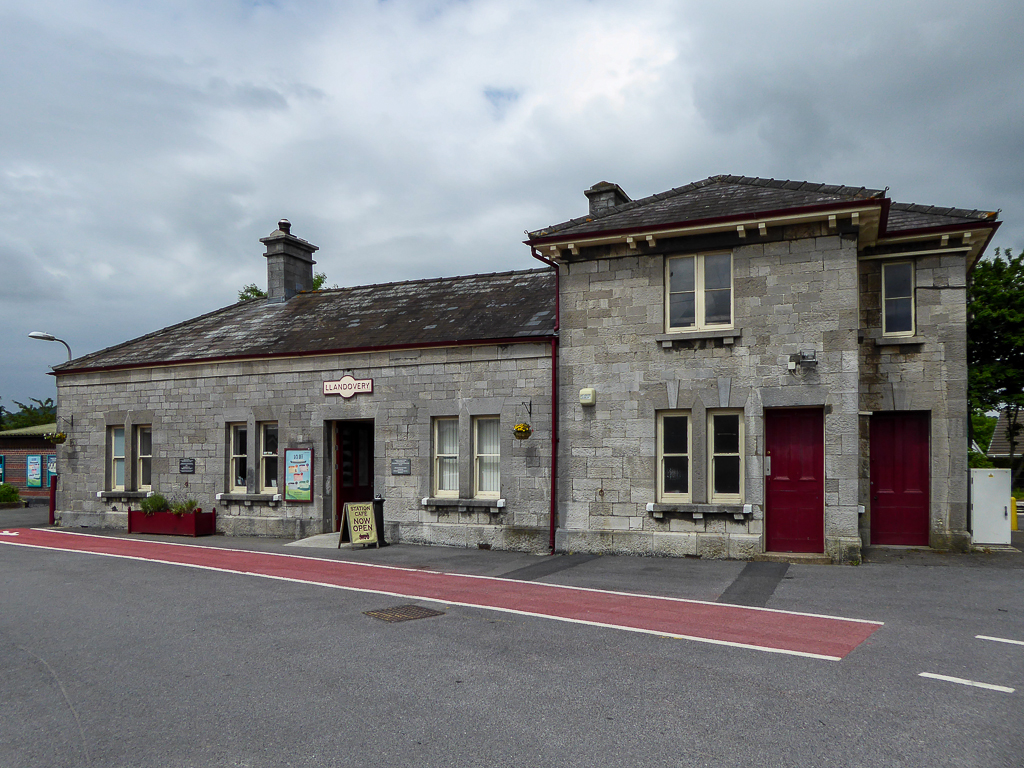
Refurbished station building which houses a cafe and gallery, seen in 2014

It was opened by the independent Vale of Towy Railway company on 1 April 1858 as the terminus of a branch from Llandeilo, although the VoTR was soon leased by the Llanelly Railway, which had built the route northwards from Llanelli in stages since 1833. The Llanelly company in turn soon became part of the GWR. The LNWR's Central Wales Extension Railway arrived from the north a decade later to complete the through route between Craven Arms and Swansea, after the completion of the Cynghordy Viaduct.

The station sits at the bottom of an 8 1/2 miles (13.7 km) descent from the line's southern summit at Sugar Loaf tunnel and, until August 1964, a locomotive shed was in operation here to house the engines used for assisting northbound trains (the ruling gradient on this section being 1 in 60).

There is a passing loop and level crossing (of the A40 road) at the station, although the token instruments for the single line and crossing barriers are both operated by the train crew under the supervision of the signaller at Pantyffynnon. The loop had been temporarily decommissioned between 2008 & 2010, but is in use again after the automatic point machines were renewed in June 2010.

Refurbished station buildings were opened by Prince Charles in June 2011, having closed in 1992.

The station was shortlisted for the Best Station (Small) at the 2019 National Rail Awards.

== Facilities ==
The station is unstaffed and has no ticket machine, so all tickets need to be purchased prior to travel or on board the train. There are shelters, CIS screens and customer help points on each platform. Step-free access is provided to both platforms.

A local volunteer group runs a cafe and gallery in the main station building.

== Passenger volume ==
Passenger volume at Llandovery
	2004–05	2005–06	2006–07	2007–08	2008–09	2009–10	2010–11	2011–12	2012–13	2013–14	2014–15	2015–16	2016–17	2017–18	2018–19	2019–20	2020–21	2021–22	2022–23	2023–24	2024–25
Entries and exits	20,264	19,427	16,717	20,305	19,796	18,756	20,050	20,094	17,628	16,964	18,890	17,024	15,596	16,732	15,750	15,688	478	6,656	9,588	12,692	13,702

The statistics cover twelve month periods that start in April.

== Services ==
There are five trains a day northbound to Shrewsbury from Monday to Saturday and six southbound to Swansea (one train starts/terminates here, but doesn't run on Saturdays); two services each way call on Sundays. An extra Monday to Saturday departure each way was reintroduced at the winter 2025 timetable change.

Preceding station	National Rail	Following station
Llanwrda	Transport for Wales; Heart of Wales Line	Cynghordy

== Community rail ==
The station, along with all others on the line, is promoted by the Heart of Wales Community Rail Partnership.

== Bibliography ==
- Body, G. (1983), PSL Field Guides - Railways of the Western Region, Patrick Stephens Ltd, Wellingborough, ISBN 0-85059-546-0
- Caton, Peter (2018). Remote Stations. Leicestershire: Matador. ISBN 978-1-78901-408-2.
- Organ, John (2008). Mitchell, Vic (ed.). Craven Arms to Llandeilo. West Sussex: Middleton Press. figs. 100-110. ISBN 9781906008352. OCLC 648080889.
- Quick, Michael (2023). Railway Passenger Stations in Great Britain: A Chronology (PDF) (5th ed.). London: Railway and Canal Historical Society.
