= Llanfair-ar-y-bryn =

Community and parish in Carmarthenshire, Wales

Coordinates: 52°02′36″N 3°44′17″W

- Community
- Location within Carmarthenshire
- Principal area: Carmarthenshire
- Country: Wales
- Sovereign state: United Kingdom
- Police: Dyfed-Powys
- Fire: Mid and West Wales
- Ambulance: Welsh
- List of places UK Wales Carmarthenshire Map of the community

Llanfair-ar-y-bryn is a community and Church in Wales parish in Carmarthenshire, Wales. Covering an area of some 95 km², it lies along and to the northwest and southeast of the A483 Swansea to Chester road immediately north of the town of Llandovery. The population of the community at the 2011 census was 624. The term also referred to a church located outside the parish.

== Description ==
Two particularities of Llanfair-ar-y-bryn (meaning: "St Mary's on the hill") are that

- the community and parish contain no settlement of that name: in 1801 it comprised the hamlets of Rhandir Abbot, Rhandir Canol, Rhandir Isaf, and Rhandir Uchaf; today the principal settlements are Cynghordy and Rhandir-mwyn
- the parish church was, until 1883, located one mile outside the parish itself, in Llandingad (Llandovery); in 1883 a new church (also called St Mary's) was opened at a more central location in Cynghordy.

The area is served by trains operated between Swansea and Shrewsbury via Llandrindod Wells by Transport for Wales, which manages Cynghordy railway station, a request stop on the Heart of Wales Line from Llanelli to Craven Arms.

The community is bordered by the communities of: Myddfai; Llandovery; and Cilycwm, all being in Carmarthenshire; by Llanddewi Brefi in Ceredigion; and by: Llanwrtyd Wells; Llangamarch; Maescar; and Llywel, all in Powys.

== The old parish church, Llanfair-ar-y-bryn ==
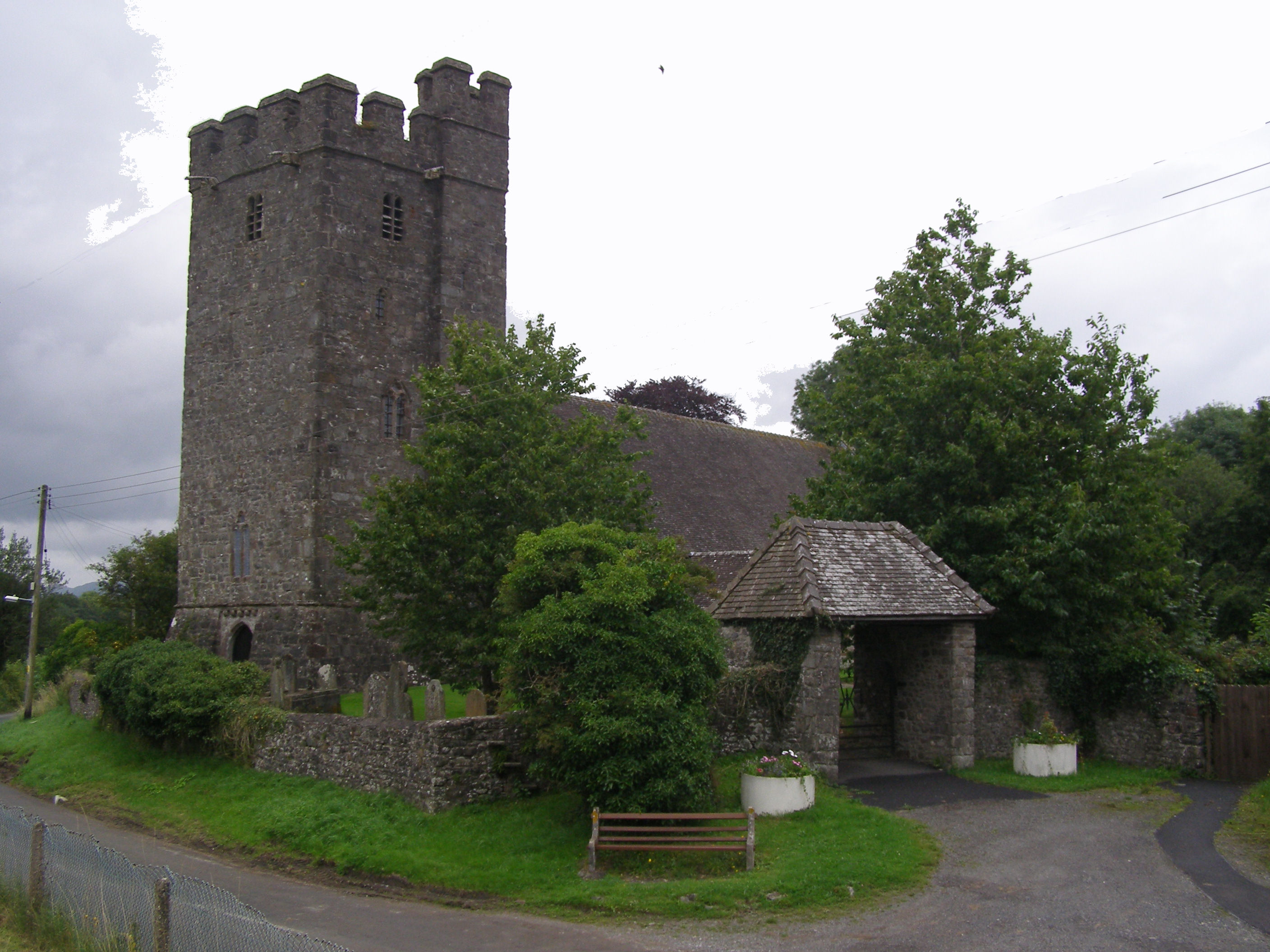
The original parish church of Llanfair-ar-y-bryn

The original Church of St Mary stands a mile outside the parish on the northeastern edge of Llandovery, on the site of the Roman auxiliary fort of Alabum.

William Williams Pantycelyn (1717–1791), generally acknowledged as one of Wales's greatest hymn writers, is buried in the churchyard there, having been a resident of the parish for much of his life.
