= Swansea Bay railway station =

Former railway station in Wales

Coordinates: 51.6120°N 3.9594°W

Swansea Bay

General information
- Location: Swansea, Glamorgan; Wales
- Platforms: 2

Other information
- Status: Disused

History
- Original company: Llanelly Railway
- Pre-grouping: London and North Western Railway
- Post-grouping: London, Midland and Scottish Railway

Key dates
- 1867: Opened
- 30 May 1892: Resited about 40 yards west.
- 1964: closed
Location

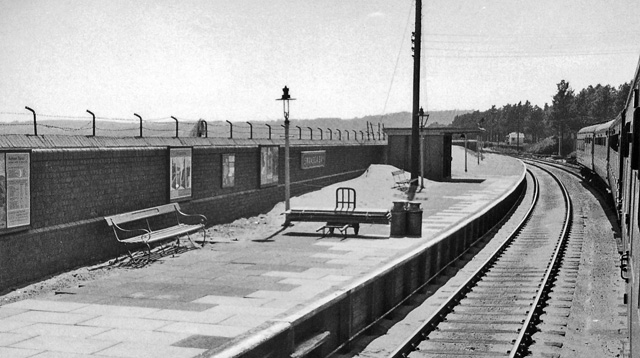
Swansea Bay railway station

Swansea Bay is a former railway station in Swansea next to Swansea Bay, in South Wales, opened to passenger and goods traffic on 14 December 1867. Owned successively by the Llanelly Railway and Dock Company (1867 to 1871), the Swansea and Carmarthen Railways Company (1871 to 1873), the London and North Western Railway Company (L.N.W.R., 1873 to 1922), the London, Midland and Scottish Railway Company (L.M.S., 1923 to 1947) and British Railways (1948 to 1964), it was served by trains to and from Shrewsbury, Crewe, Liverpool, Manchester and York and formed the southern terminus of the Central Wales line, most of which is still operational as the Heart of Wales Line.The station was resited in 1892 and closed in June 1964, having been listed in the Report on the Reshaping of British Railways (better known as the Beeching Report) the previous year. The former station is near 'The Slip' opposite the Bay View Public House. It was adjacent to the Swansea and Mumbles Railway which was closed in 1960, and opposite the Western end of St Helen's Road, which until the 1930s was the terminus of one of the Town tram lines. Much of the trackbed is now part of the A4067 road towards Swansea Victoria.
