= Sugar Loaf, Carmarthenshire =

Hill in Carmarthenshire, Wales

Sugar Loaf
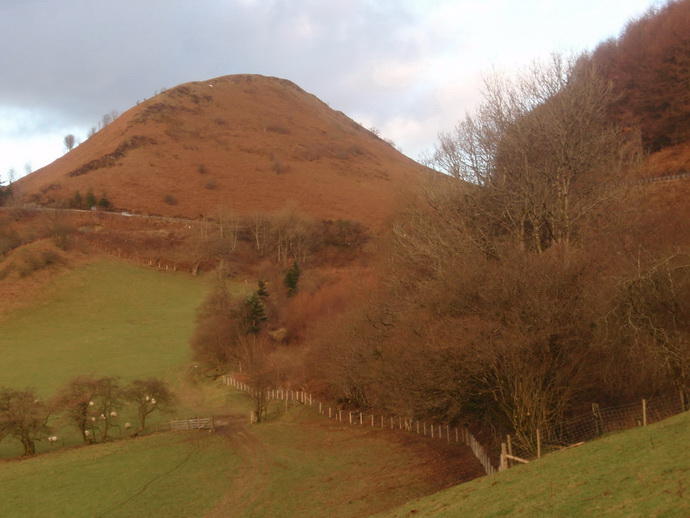

Highest point
- Listing: Marilyn
- Coordinates: 52.071°N 3.702°W

Geography
- Location: Carmarthenshire, Wales
- OS grid: SN834427
- Topo map: OS Explorer 187

Climbing
- Easiest route: car park 400 m NE

The Sugar Loaf is a prominent hill in Carmarthenshire, Wales, beside the A483 trunk road, some four miles (six kilometres) south-west of Llanwrtyd Wells. It is a popular viewpoint and picnic spot within easy reach on foot from the roadside car parks to the northeast and to the south. There is a stop on the nearby Heart of Wales Line called Sugar Loaf railway station.

The name Sugar Loaf has been applied to numerous hills which have a perceived resemblance to a sugarloaf; the nearest is the Sugar Loaf on the border between Powys and Monmouthshire.
