= LC, Swansea =

Leisure centre in Swansea, Wales

LC
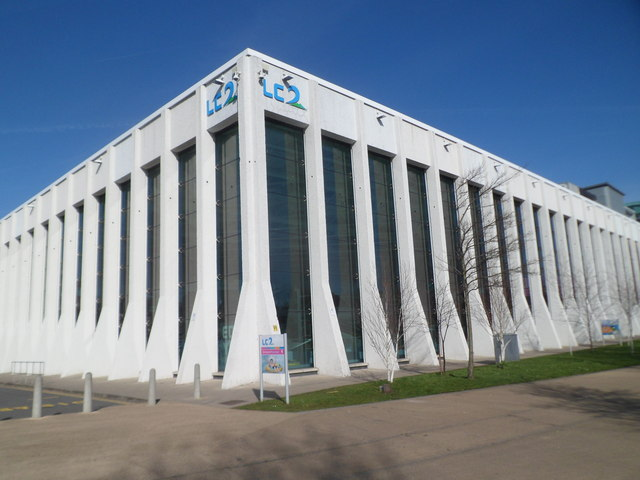
- Interactive map of the LC area
- Former names: Swansea Leisure Centre

General information
- Location: Swansea
- Coordinates: 51°37′01″N 3°56′26″W
- Current tenants: Freedom leisure
- Construction started: 1977
- Completed: 1977
- Opened: 1977
- Renovated: 1 March 2008
- Cost: £32,000,000 Renovation
- Owner: City and County of Swansea council

The LC is a leisure centre in the city centre of Swansea, Wales. Originally Swansea Leisure Centre, it was rebranded as 'The LC' when the facility reopened to the public on 1 March 2008 after a £32 million makeover. The building's exterior was revitalised by replacing concrete panels with clear glass, translucent glazing, and timber panelling.

== History ==
Swansea Leisure Centre was built on the site of the former Swansea Victoria railway station, opened by the Queen during her silver jubilee celebrations in 1977. The original centre featured the first wave machine to be installed in a leisure centre in Wales; it became one of Wales' top leisure facilities and a substantial tourist draw, attracting more than 800,000 users annually at its peak. After its closure in 2003, Swansea Council decided to refurbish the centre, which was reopened – again by the Queen – on 7 March 2008.

== Features ==
The LC's waterpark features include water slides, surf simulator, a 30 ft climbing wall, an indoor play area, a multi-purpose sports and exhibition hall (which was an official training facility for the 2012 London Olympics), exercise areas, and a spa and sauna section.

== Logo ==
The "LC" logo was designed to be intentionally ambiguous, with the '2' implying the relaunch of the old Swansea Leisure Centre, or a wave and some mountains, signifying Swansea and the surrounding area or the surf simulator and climb wall inside the LC, or a swan, representing Swansea.
