= Cynghordy =

Village in Carmarthenshire, Wales

Coordinates: 52°03′N 3°44′W

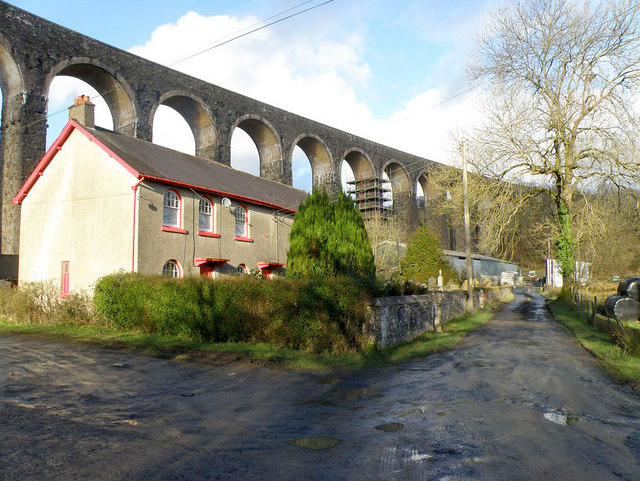
Cynghordy Viaduct and Gosen Chapel

Cynghordy (Welsh pronunciation) is a village in the rural community of Llanfair-ar-y-bryn in Carmarthenshire, Wales. It lies on the A483 road northeast of the town of Llandovery, and is served by Cynghordy railway station on the Heart of Wales Line.
