= Cynghordy railway station =

Railway station in Carmarthenshire, Wales

Cynghordy
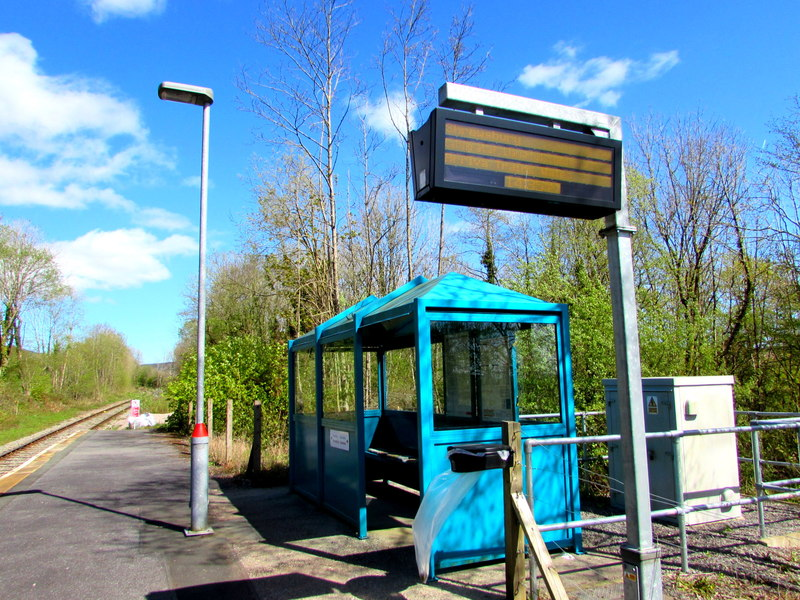

General information
- Location: Cynghordy, Carmarthenshire; Wales
- Coordinates: 52.0515°N 3.7483°W
- Grid reference: SN802406
- Manager: Transport for Wales
- Platforms: 1

Other information
- Station code: CYN
- Classification: DfT category F2

History
- Opened: 8 June 1868

Passengers
- 2021/22: ▲614
- 2022/23: ▲1,112
- 2023/24: ▼1,012
- 2024/25: ▲1,188
- 2025/26: ▲1,466
Location
Notes
- Passenger statistics from the Office of Rail and Road

Cynghordy railway station (Welsh pronunciation) serves the rural community of Cynghordy near Llandovery, Carmarthenshire, Wales. The station is on the Heart of Wales Line between Llandovery and Sugar Loaf, 54 miles 55 chains (88.0 km) from Craven Arms South Junction, and is located at street level at the end of a gravel track off a lane that is just off the main A483 road.

After departing this station heading northbound, the train crosses the Cynghordy Viaduct where panoramic views of the surrounding countryside can be seen. The grade II* listed 18-arch viaduct carries the route across the Afon Bran valley on a gentle curve.

== History ==
The station opened on 8 June 1868. The station previously had a passing loop but no second platform.

== Facilities ==
The station had no facilities whatsoever for many years but a shelter is now provided along with a customer help point and CIS screen.

== Passenger volume ==
The station is among the least used stations within Wales; in the 2023–24 period, it was the tenth-least used.

Passenger volume at Cynghordy
	2004–05	2005–06	2006–07	2007–08	2008–09	2009–10	2010–11	2011–12	2012–13	2013–14	2014–15	2015–16	2016–17	2017–18	2018–19	2019–20	2020–21	2021–22	2022–23	2023–24	2024–25
Entries and exits	1,871	1,741	1,282	1,430	1,660	1,396	1,628	1,166	1,752	1,312	1,286	1,104	994	1,170	1,046	1,430	28	614	1,112	1,012	1,188

The statistics cover twelve month periods that start in April.

== Services ==
All trains serving the station are operated by Transport for Wales (who also manage it). There are five trains a day in each direction (towards Swansea and Shrewsbury) from Monday to Saturday, and two services on Sundays. This is a request stop, whereby passengers have to give a hand signal to the approaching train driver to board or notify the guard when they board that they wish to alight from the train there.

Preceding station	National Rail	Following station
Llandovery	Transport for Wales; Heart of Wales Line	Sugar Loaf

== Community rail ==
The station, along with all others on the line, is promoted by the Heart of Wales Community Rail Partnership.

== Bibliography ==
- Caton, Peter (2018). Remote Stations. Leicestershire: Matador. ISBN 978-1-78901-408-2.
- Organ, John (2008). Mitchell, Vic (ed.). Craven Arms to Llandeilo. West Sussex: Middleton Press. figs. 93-99. ISBN 9781906008352. OCLC 648080889.
- Quick, Michael (2023). Railway Passenger Stations in Great Britain: A Chronology (PDF) (5th ed.). London: Railway and Canal Historical Society.
