= Sugar Loaf railway station =

Railway station in Powys, Wales

Sugar Loaf Welsh: Dinas y Bwlch
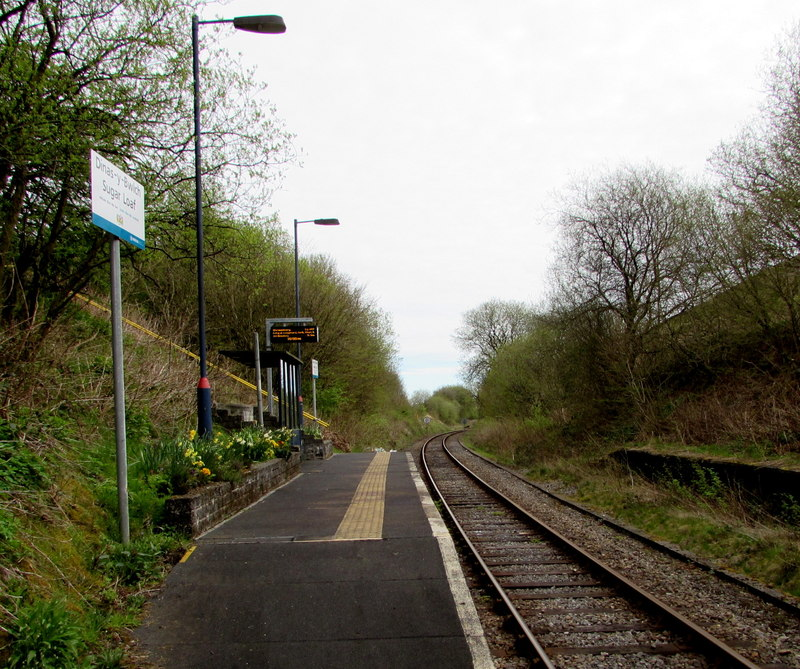
- Sugar Loaf station in April 2017

General information
- Location: Near Sugar Loaf Mountain, Llandovery, Powys; Wales
- Coordinates: 52.082°N 3.687°W
- Grid reference: SN844438
- Manager: Transport for Wales
- Platforms: 1

Other information
- Station code: SUG
- Classification: DfT category F2

Key dates
- 1868: Opened
- 1965: Closed
- 1984: Reopened
- 6 July 2020: Temporarily closed
- 21 August 2021: Reopened

Passengers
- 2021/22: ▲76
- 2022/23: ▲398
- 2023/24: ▲992
- 2024/25: ▼842
- 2025/26: ▼268
Location
Notes
- Passenger statistics from the Office of Rail and Road

Sugar Loaf railway station is a railway station in Powys, Wales, and is on the Heart of Wales Line, between Cynghordy and Llanwrtyd, 50 miles 65 chains (81.8 km) from Craven Arms South Junction, where the line joins the Welsh Marches line. It is the most geographically remote station in Wales, northeast of a small but prominent knoll known as Sugar Loaf, around which the A483 road loops.

== History ==
The line through here was opened by the Central Wales Extension Railway on 8 October 1868 and the station opened in 1989, originally known as Sugar Loaf Summit and later as Sugar Loaf Halt (although it was only used by railway workers). It was originally built to serve a number of cottages occupied by railway workers (such as signalmen and track gangers). The children of the workers travelled by train to school in Llanwrtyd Wells.

The passing loop and associated Sugar Loaf Summit signal box at the south end of the platform were removed, and the station closed to passengers in 1965 but the station subsequently reopened to traffic in 1984, albeit on Sundays only; it was not until 1995 that it gained a daily service, all year round. It was renamed from Sugar Loaf Halt to its current name in 1989.

Between 6 July 2020 and 21 August 2021, trains did not call at the station due to the short platform and the inability to maintain social distancing for COVID-19 between passengers and the guard when opening the train door.

== Facilities ==
The station has basic amenities only - a waiting shelter and timetable poster boards - although it has had a digital CIS display fitted. There is no step-free access available, due to the station entrance being down some steps from the nearest road (the A483) along a narrow path and in a cutting. As there are no facilities to purchase tickets, passengers must buy one in advance, or from the guard on the train.

== Passenger volume ==
The station sees very few passengers; in 2010/2011 an estimated 84 passengers used the station and in 2014 it was reported that the station was averaging five passengers per month. In 2017/2018, it increased its passenger usage by nearly 710% from the previous year, taking it to as many visitors in the year as the previous 17 years combined. Its low usage seemed to make it a popular attraction. In 2020, with rail passenger numbers in general affected by the COVID-19 pandemic, the station saw 156 passengers, followed by zero the following year.

This station is a request stop used mainly by trekkers and cyclists, since it is the nearest stop to the Sugar Loaf vantage point.

Passenger volume at Sugar Loaf
	2004–05	2005–06	2006–07	2007–08	2008–09	2009–10	2010–11	2011–12	2012–13	2013–14	2014–15	2015–16	2016–17	2017–18	2018–19	2019–20	2020–21	2021–22	2022–23	2023–24	2024–25
Entries and exits	122	59	67	111	120	106	84	120	144	240	110	132	228	1,846	708	156	0	76	398	992	842

The statistics cover twelve month periods that start in April.

== Services ==
All trains serving the station are operated by Transport for Wales. There are five trains a day in each direction (towards Swansea and Shrewsbury) from Monday to Saturday, and two services on Sundays. Being a request stop, passengers have to give a hand signal to the approaching train driver to board or notify the guard when they board that they wish to alight from the train there.

Preceding station	National Rail	Following station
Cynghordy	Transport for Wales; Heart of Wales Line	Llanwrtyd

== Bibliography ==
- Caton, Peter (2018). Remote Stations. Leicestershire: Matador. ISBN 978-1-78901-408-2.
- Organ, John (2008). Mitchell, Vic (ed.). Craven Arms to Llandeilo. West Sussex: Middleton Press. figs. 86-92. ISBN 9781906008352. OCLC 648080889.
- Quick, Michael (2023). Railway Passenger Stations in Great Britain: A Chronology (PDF) (5th ed.). London: Railway and Canal Historical Society.
- Wills, Dixe (2014). Tiny Stations (Paperback, 1st reprint ed.). Basingstoke: AA Publishing. ISBN 978-0-7495-7732-2.
