= Cynghordy Viaduct =

Viaduct in Carmarthenshire

- Cynghordy Viaduct in 2022
- Coordinates: 52.061308°N 3.739627°W
- Locale: Cynghordy, Llandovery, Carmarthenshire, Wales

Characteristics
- Total length: 1,000 ft (300 m)
- Height: 109 ft (33 m)
- Longest span: 36 ft (11 m)
- No. of spans: 18

History
- Architect: Henry Robertson
- Built: 1867–1868

Statistics

Listed Building – Grade II*
- Official name: Cynghordy Viaduct
- Designated: 8 July 1966
- Reference no.: 10922

Location
- Interactive map of Cynghordy Viaduct

Cynghordy Viaduct is a grade-II* listed viaduct on the Heart of Wales line in Cynghordy near Llandovery in Carmarthenshire.

== Description ==
Arches of the viaduct in 2005

The viaduct is located approximately 1.5 km (0.93 mi) north of Cynghordy near Llandovery in the community of Llanfair-ar-y-Bryn in the county of Carmarthenshire. It was built for the Central Wales Line and carries a single-track railway across the valley of the Afon Brân.

The stone viaduct is narrow and curved. It has 18 round-headed arches and is 1,000 ft (300 m) long and 109 ft (33 m) high. It was built in sandstone and lined with brick. Each brick-barrelled arch is 36ft wide.

It is accessed via the A483 and best seen from a minor road north of Cynghordy, or by alighting at the request-only stop at Cynghordy railway station.

== History ==
Photo of the viaduct from the 1920s by Percy Benzie Abery

The viaduct was designed in 1867–1868 by Henry Robertson, who also built the Cefn Viaduct and the Ruabon railway station. It was built as part of the Central Wales Extension Railway to connect Llandovery to Llanelli.

It was designated as grade II* in 1966.

In 2017, Network Rail completed a £3.5 million upgrade to the viaduct to strengthen it, bonding a stainless steel bar, which is hidden by mortar, into the masonry. The work required 2,010 metres (6,590 feet) of scaffold board and 20,000 staff hours of work.

== Recognition ==
A blue plaque was unveiled at the site in 2024, funded by the Llanfair-ar-y-Bryn Community Council.

A study by Explore Worldwide in 2022 named the Cynghordy Viaduct Walk as the second most underrated travel experience in Europe and the fifth in the world.
