= Swansea Victoria railway station =

Railway station in Swansea, south Wales

Coordinates: 51.6174°N 3.9397°W

Swansea Victoria
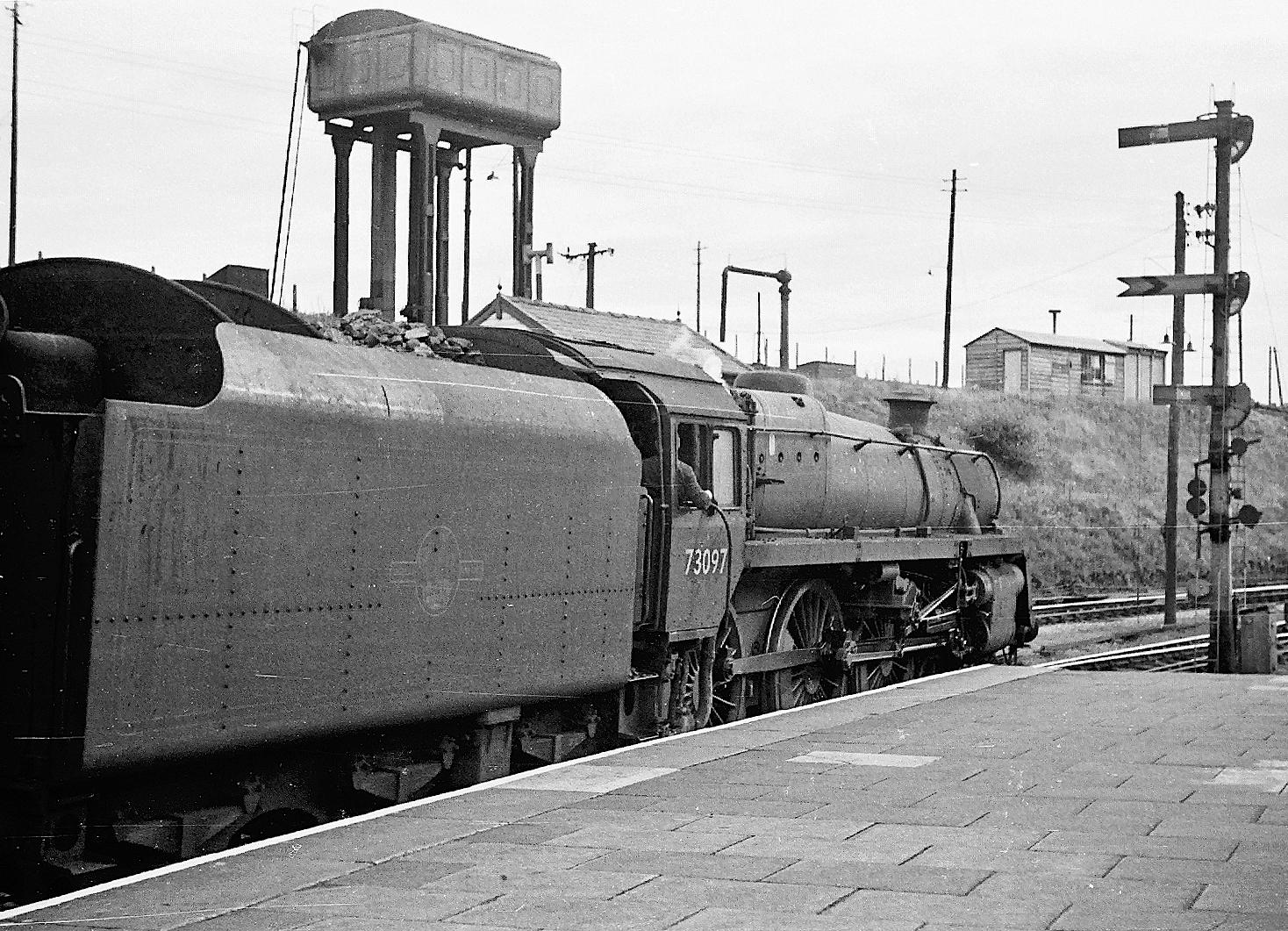
- September 1962

General information
- Location: Swansea, Glamorgan; Wales
- Platforms: 2

Other information
- Status: Demolished

History
- Original company: Llanelly Railway
- Pre-grouping: London and North Western Railway
- Post-grouping: London, Midland and Scottish Railway

Key dates
- 1867: Opened
- 1964: Closed
Location

Swansea Victoria is a former railway station in Swansea, south Wales, opened to passenger and goods traffic on 14 December 1867. Owned successively by the Llanelly Railway and Dock Company (1867 to 1871), the Swansea and Carmarthen Railways Company (1871 to 1873), the London and North Western Railway Company (L.N.W.R., 1873 to 1922), the London, Midland and Scottish Railway Company (L.M.S., 1923 to 1947) and British Railways (1948 to 1964), it was served by trains to and from Shrewsbury, Crewe, Liverpool, Manchester and York and formed the southern terminus of the Central Wales line, most of which is still operational as the Heart of Wales Line. Victoria closed in June 1964, having been listed in the Report on the Reshaping of British Railways (better known as the Beeching Report) the previous year. The site was subsequently cleared and used for Swansea Leisure Centre (now the LC).
