= Llanelly Railway =

Welsh railway system

The Llanelly Railway and Dock Company was an early Welsh railway system. It opened its first short line and a wet dock at Llanelli in 1834, and soon went on to build a longer line from Llanelly to serve pits in the Amman Valley, and then on to Llandilo, reached in 1857. The Llanelly Railway and Dock Company leased and worked the Vale of Towy Railway on to Llandovery, from 1858.

Responding to competitive pressure the company obtained authorisation to connect its network to Swansea and Carmarthen, but the failure of a contractor put the company into financial difficulty, and a financial reconstruction later led to the Swansea and Carmarthen lines passing to the London and North Western Railway, while the original core system was taken over by the Great Western Railway.

The line from Swansea to Llandovery became part of the Central Wales Line connecting to Shrewsbury and the north-west, but after the 1960s only the Llanelli to Llandovery line and short colliery connections in the Amman Valley remained in use.

Before 1971 many place names had Anglicised spelling. The railway system was slow to convert the names of railway locations.

== Prior to the Llanelly Railway and Dock Company ==
In the 18th century minerals had been extracted in the area around Llanelli, and smelting of metals was taking place locally well before the end of that century. Conveyance of heavy minerals over the primitive roads of the day was an expensive and difficult business. Alexander Raby purchased mineral-bearing lands about 1795 and constructed tramways to bring the minerals to a smelting plant he owned at Furnace, near Llanelly. The tramways were wooden waggonways, and they extended to a harbour at Llanelly for onward transport of the finished product by coastal shipping.

There were extensive mineral deposits further inland at Cross Hands, and exploitation of the minerals needed a longer railway; the distance was 16 miles (26 km) and Raby was the prime mover in the formation of the Carmarthenshire Railway or Tramroad Company for the purpose. The tramroad was the first railway in Wales to obtain an authorising act of Parliament, which it did in June 1802 with the Carmarthenshire Railway or Tramroad Company Act 1802 (42 Geo. 3. c. lxxx); the capital was £250,000.

Charles Nevill came to Llanelly and in 1804 established a copper works with an associated harbour facility.

There were extensive deposits of anthracite coal at Llangennech on the River Loughor estuary east of Llanelli, and about this time an expansion of the mining there took place, with associated construction of short tramroads. The Llangennech Coal Company was formed, and concentrated on shipping from Spitty (or Yspitty) on the Loughor. However the available quays were suitable only for small vessels, and the main trade was lighterage to Llanelly Harbour for transhipment, incurring additional expense. (Note: In double handling; the coal was said to be susceptible to damage in the loading process.)

When it was decided to develop the St Davids pit above Dafen, the opportunity to improve transport to the sea showed itself; a railway directly from Dafen to a new quay at Machynis Pool (now spelt Machynys) was feasible; there would need to be an incline down from St Davids to Dafen.

== The Llanelly Railway and Dock Company ==
Llanelly Railway and Dock Act 1828
- Act of Parliament
- Parliament of the United Kingdom
- Long title: An Act for making and maintaining a Railway or Tram Road from Gelly Gille Farm, in the Parish of Llanelly in the County of Carmarthen, to Machynis Pool in the same Parish and County; and for making and maintaining a Wet Dock at the Termination of the said Railway or Tram Road at Machynis Pool aforesaid.
- Citation: 9 Geo. 4. c. xci

Dates
- Royal assent: 19 June 1828

Text of statute as originally enacted

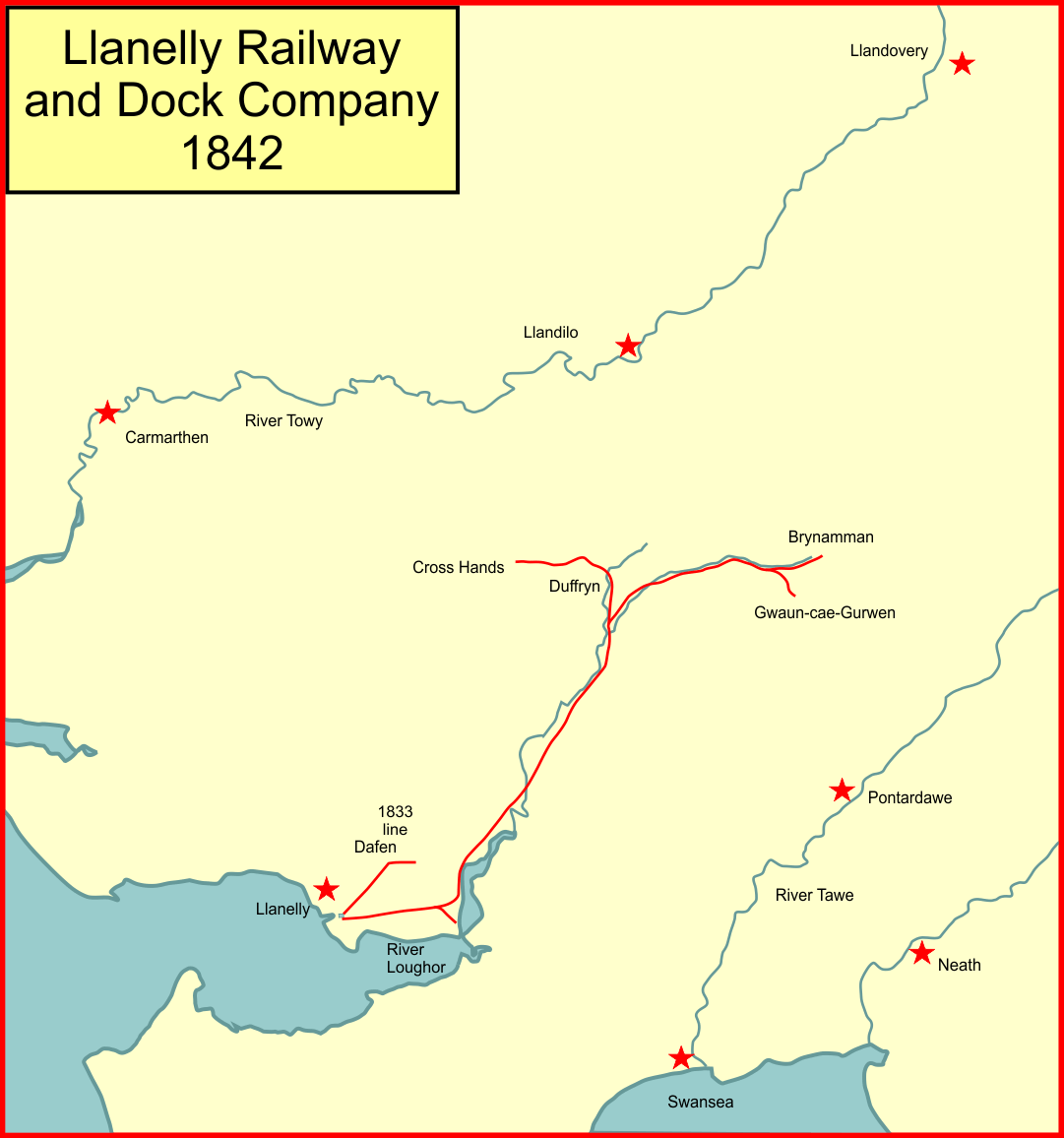
Llanelly Railway and Dock Company network in 1842

The proprietors of the Llangennech Coal Company promoted a bill in Parliament, to make a wet dock for vessels up to 300 tons at Machynis with wharves and warehouses, and build the railway to St Davids. The Llanelly Railway and Dock Act 1828 (9 Geo. 4. c. xci) was passed on 19 June 1828, authorising the Llanelly Railroad and Dock Company, with share capital of £14,000. Only horse traction could be used. At the time of the committee hearings 83% of the capital had already been subscribed. The upper terminal was described as Gelly Gille Farm.

Priestley reported on the act:

This work was projected for the purpose of conveying the minerals and other productions of the country near its line to the sea, and the dock was for the readier shipment and landing of the exports and imports to be conveyed thereon... [By the authorising act] the proprietors are incorporated under the style of "The Llanelly Railroad and Dock Company.”... The dock [is] to be so constructed as to be large enough for ships of three hundred tons burthen, with slips, poles, beacons, warping and mooring buoys, chains and capstans, and the company are to build wharfs, warehouses and other works necessary for the purposes of the act.

The length of the railway is two miles and three hundred yards, in which distance there is a rise of 68 feet above high water-mark; the dock is two hundred yards by fifty-five at the bottom, calculated to hold twenty-one vessels of three hundred tons as mentioned above; the depth is 16 feet below high-water-mark of the highest spring tides, and the flood-gates at the entrance are 36 feet wide. Mr. F. Foster estimated the whole at £11,736, 3s. 4d. including £8,074, 10s. the cost of the dock and other conveniences. The engineer’s estimate was subscribed for in equal portions by Messrs. D. T. Shears, J. H. Shears, T. Margrave and W. Ellwood, Jun.

The act stipulated that the railway and the dock could only be opened together, not independently, and that had to be within five years. In fact the seam at the St Davids pit proved more elusive than expected, and was finally found in June 1832 at a depth of 660 feet (200 m), the deepest in Wales at the time.

Llanelly Railway and Dock Act 1833
- Act of Parliament
- Parliament of the United Kingdom
- Long title: An Act to alter amend and enlarge the Powers of an Act passed in the Ninth Year of the Reign of His late Majesty King George the Fourth, for making and maintaining a Railway or Tramroad from Gelly Gille Farm in the Parish of Llanelly in the County of Carmarthen to Machynis Pool in the same Parish and County, and for making and maintaining a Wet Dock at the Termination of the said Railway or Tramroad at Machynis Pool aforesaid.
- Citation: 3 & 4 Will. 4. c. lii

Dates
- Royal assent: 17 May 1833

Text of statute as originally enacted

The delay meant that the works could not be completed within the authorised time, and a second act of Parliament, the Llanelly Railway and Dock Act 1833 (3 & 4 Will. 4. c. lii), was obtained allowed a time extension; it also permitted the use of steam locomotives on the line.

The dock at Machynis, now called the New Dock, was completed in 1834, although the dock and railway appear to have been first used on 16 July 1833. It was stated to be the first public wet dock in Wales.

The existence of the railway and the dock quickly led to considerable business, especially in the foreign export of coal; the East India Company was a particularly important customer. Not only the Llangennech Coal Company but numerous other pits came to use the line and the dock.

The company paid a 3% dividend in 1837 and 1838 and paid a remarkable 12% in 1839.

Horse traction was used exclusively on the line for several years, but from January 1858 a locomotive was employed.

== Extending northwards ==
With opening of the dock and the Dafen line in 1834, the directors were already thinking of a railway line northwards from Llanelly and Llangennech to Llandilo. Such a line would open up access to known important coal deposits in the valley of the River Amman, and Llandilo was an important agricultural centre.

Llanelly Railway and Dock Company Act 1835
- Act of Parliament
- Parliament of the United Kingdom
- Long title: An Act to authorize the Llanelly Railway and Dock Company to make certain additional Railways or Tramroads, and for other Purposes connected therewith.
- Citation: 5 & 6 Will. 4. c. xcvi

Dates
- Royal assent: 21 August 1835

Text of statute as originally enacted

The Llanelly Railway and Dock Company Act 1835 (5 & 6 Will. 4. c. xcvi) was passed on 21 August 1835, and the company was retitled the Llanelly Railway and Dock Company. The line was to run from the south side of the New Dock, avoiding interference with the Dafen line which ran to the north side. The main line would run through Llangennech, Pontarddulais and Llandybie. There were to be thirteen branches, mostly short spurs to nearby pits but including one to Gelli Fawr and Garnant, and another to Cross Hands on Mynydd Mawr, later to be known as the Mountain Branch, or Great Mountain Branch.

== Opening to Pontardulais and Cwmamman ==
The line from Pontardulais to the New Dock at Llanelly was opened for mineral traffic on 1 June 1839.

From Pontardulais construction was directed towards the Amman Valley as having greater income potential than the rural route towards Llandilo. From Pontardulais to Cwmamman (later called Garnant) was opened on 10 April 1840 and the line was extended to Gwaun-cae-Gurwen on 6 May 1841. There were two rope worked inclines on the branch, one of them 1 mile (1.6 km) in length.

The (Great) Mountain branch opened on 6 May 1841 to goods and mineral traffic only; the route, included a 1/2 mile (0.80 km) balanced cable incline at a gradient of 1 in 12.

In 1841 the company provided a return to the Board of Trade summarising certain aspects of the line's operation; significant portions of the line were operated by horse traction only. Where locomotives were used the speed was limited to 9 miles per hour (14 km/h). There was stated to be "scarcely any passenger traffic, coal and mineral produce being the chief and almost only trade over the line to Llanelly". The passenger business appears to have been achieved by attaching passenger vehicles to mineral trains, without an organised timetable. Two locomotives were in use on the line from 1840.

In June 1842 a further branch was opened, from Garnant (Cwmamman) to Brynamman. The continuing expansion of the mineral business resulted in five locomotives being in use on the line by 1847.

== Contract operation and passengers ==
The South Wales Railway was planning a trunk main line from near Gloucester to Fishguard. The Llanelly Railway and Dock Company attempted to sell its line to the South Wales Railway, but that approach did not bear fruit, and in January 1850 a contract was made with Ianson, Fossick and Hackworth to work and maintain the line. They operated a through passenger service between Swansea and Llandilo from May 1850, consisting of omnibuses at each end and railway transit from Pontardulais and Duffryn. The contract had been intended to operate for seven years but it was terminated by mutual consent in August 1853.

In 1850 the passenger trains on the line appeared in Bradshaw's guide; stations were at Llanelly Dock, Bynea, Llangennech, Pontardulais, Cross Inn and Garnant.

== South Wales Railway ==
By this time the South Wales Railway (SWR) was constructing its 7 ft 1/4 in (2,140 mm) line from near Gloucester to Fishguard. (The western terminal was later changed to Neyland). The South Wales Railway, routed east to west, needed to cross both the lines of the Llanelly Railway and Dock Company, and the latter started to make obstructions to the process. The exact configuration of the crossing was not laid down in the South Wales Railway Act 1845 (8 & 9 Vict. c. cxc), and in the event of failure to agree arrangements the matter would have gone to a jury for determination. The Llanelly had experienced difficulty in obtaining subscriptions to complete its intended line to Llandilo, and for some time held out for the purchase by the SWR of its entire network for £230,000.

The SWR had no wish to acquire a narrow gauge (as 4 ft 8 1/2 in or 1,435 mm standard gauge was described at the time) mineral branch line, and for some time considered a viaduct to avoid the flat crossing of the Llanelly lines, which seemed to be the point at issue. The issue continued fruitlessly until the SWR opened its main line in October 1852; a flat crossing was provided and the Llanelly Railway and Dock Company insisted on controlling the crossing. An exchange goods shed was built at the SWR station, served by a spur from the Llanelly Railway, opened in June 1853.

== The dock at Llanelly ==
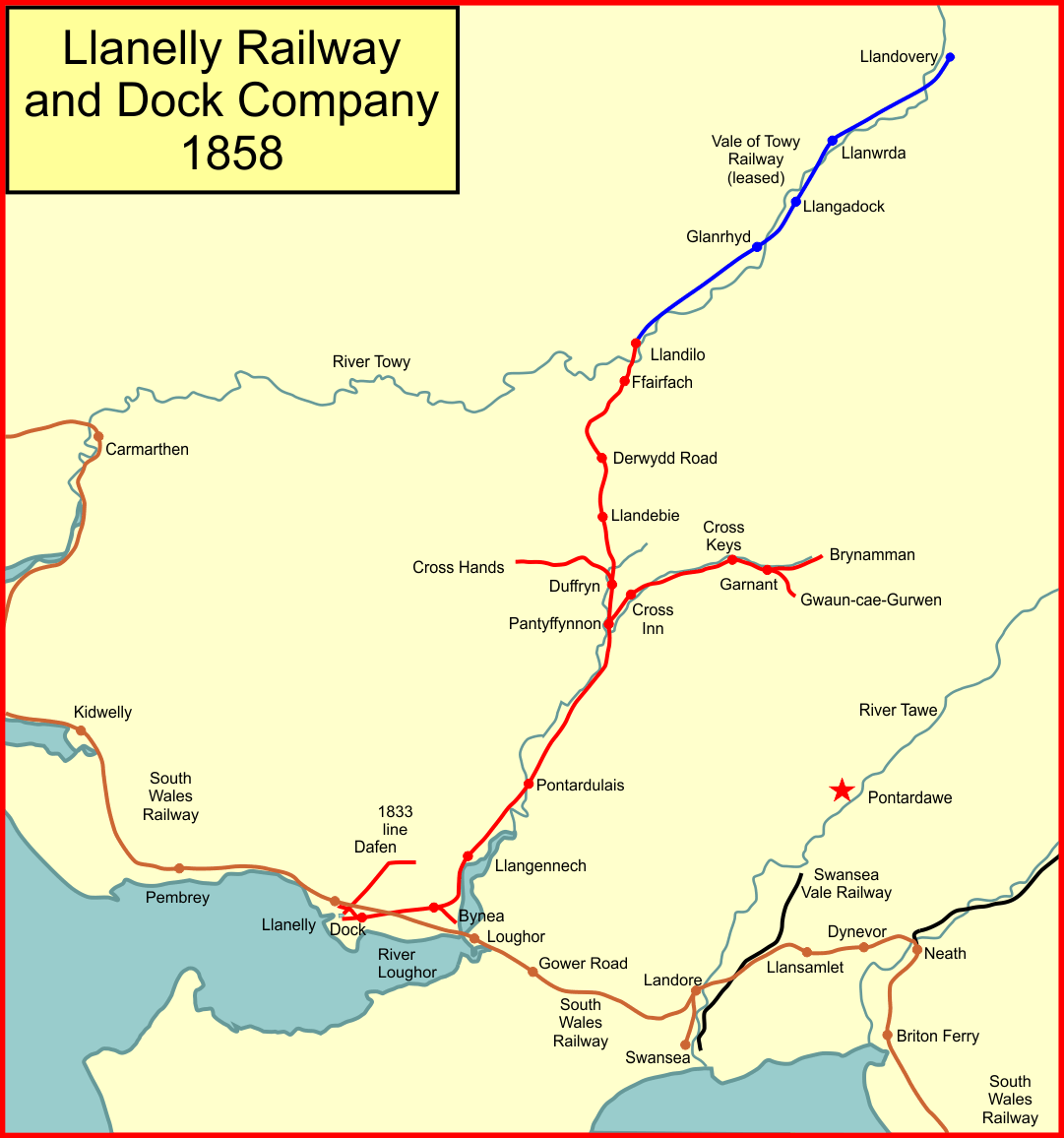
The Llanelly Railway and Dock network in 1858

The dock at Llanelly was not walled, but had unimproved sloping margins; timber jetties with shoots were erected for loading vessels. The harbour pool was gated, and from time to time the provision of a second set of gates forming a lock was considered, but not proceeded with. Hydraulic machinery was provided from March 1858 by the Llanelly Dock Hydraulic Company, an entity evidently established for the purpose.

With the South Wales Railway (SWR) established, there was pressure to connect the dock at Llanelly to it by a broad gauge connection so as to bring business to the dock. The dock was an intrinsic part of the Llanelly Railway and Dock Company's business, but once again it engaged in attempts to get the SWR to pay for the branch. These were fruitless, and the Llanelly Railway and Dock Company eventually built it, opening it in January 1859.

== Extending to Llandilo ==
Llanelly Railway and Dock Act 1853
- Act of Parliament
- Parliament of the United Kingdom
- Long title: An Act for enabling the Llanelly Railway and Dock Company to make new Railways, and for other Purposes, and of which the Short Title is "The Llanelly Railway and Dock Act, 1853."
- Citation: 16 & 17 Vict. c. clxix

Dates
- Royal assent: 4 August 1853

Text of statute as originally enacted

The company now returned to the extension to Llandilo; with the financial performance improved, it was possible to seek further finance, and in 1853 it obtained the Llanelly Railway and Dock Act 1853 (16 & 17 Vict. c. clxix) re-authorising the Llandilo line with considerable new capital. Included was the possibility of building it to the broad gauge and converting the existing network similarly, leaving open the option of selling the concern to the SWR.

On 1 March 1855 a contract was let for the work, and the line was opened ceremonially to Llandilo on 20 January 1857, (Note: Denman; but on page 57 he says, referring to Llandilo, "The line from the south carried traffic from 1st January 1857, being formally opened on 21st January".) and to the public on 24 January.

A local newspaper reported that it was now possible to look forward to the day when Llandilo would be connected by rail with ports in the north of England.

== Vale of Towy Railway ==
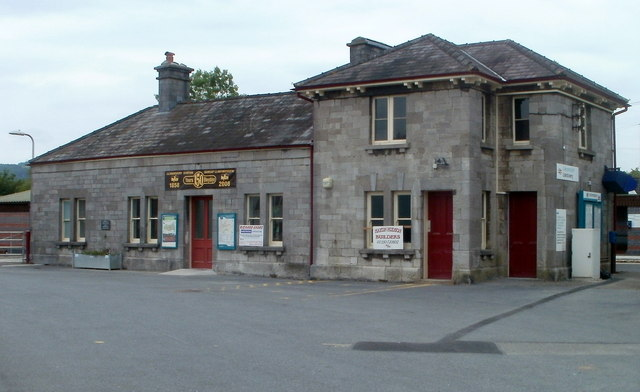
Llandovery railway station building in 2011

The connection to the north of England was to be facilitated by the independent Vale of Towy Railway. In 1853 a parliamentary bill had been presented, and as it was unopposed, its passage easily led to royal assent being granted to the Vale of Towy Railway Act 1854 (17 & 18 Vict. c. cl) on 10 July 1854, for a line from Llandovery to Llandilo. Capital was £55,000 and mixed gauge track was authorised, as sale to the Great Western Railway or its allies was still contemplated. It opened its line to passengers on 1 April 1858, but goods trains had been running since either 17 February or 1 March. It was just over 11 miles (18 km) long and had five wooden viaducts over the Towy. It was worked by the Llanelly Railway and Dock Company.

There were intermediate stations at Lampeter Road (later renamed Llanwrda), Llangadog, and Glanrhyd from the outset. (Note: Denman; but he says on page 57 that a "platform was erected allowing the station to open on 1st May 1858.") and a station was opened at Talley Road shortly after the general opening to passengers. The Llanelly Railway station at Llandilo was used by Vale of Towy trains.

Vale of Towy Railway (Leasing) Act 1858
- Act of Parliament
- Parliament of the United Kingdom
- Long title: An Act for authorizing a Lease of the Vale of Towy Railway to the Llanelly Railway and Dock Company.
- Citation: 21 & 22 Vict. c. cxlvii

Dates
- Royal assent: 2 August 1858

Llanelly Railway and Dock Act 1860
- Act of Parliament
- Parliament of the United Kingdom
- Long title: An Act for authorizing a Lease in perpetuity of the Vale of Towy Railway to the Llanelly Railway and Dock Company, and for increasing the Capital of the Company, and for other Purposes.
- Citation: 23 & 24 Vict. c. clxi

Dates
- Royal assent: 23 July 1860

Text of statute as originally enacted

The Vale of Towy Railway (Leasing) Act 1858 (21 & 22 Vict. c. cxlvii) came into force on 2 August 1858 and authorised the Llanelly Railway and Dock Company (LR&DC) to lease the Vale of Towy line. The lease was for an initial ten years with an option later to extend it. In fact the LR&DC became alarmed that other railway companies were taking an interest in the Vale of Towy, and they included conversion of the lease term to perpetuity in the Llanelly Railway and Dock Act 1860 (23 & 24 Vict. c. clxi), which they obtained on 23 July 1860.

In fact the act authorised but did not compel the conversion of the lease term, and negotiations between the two companies were tense and protracted, and in July 1865 Vale of Towy shareholders rejected a draft lease that had been negotiated. Already in November 1863 the Central Wales Extension Railway had approached the Vale of Towy about a lease; this line was to connect from the north, and eventually formed part of the Central Wales line, on which the passenger operation is marketed at the present time as the Heart of Wales Line.

== Swansea Vale Railway ==
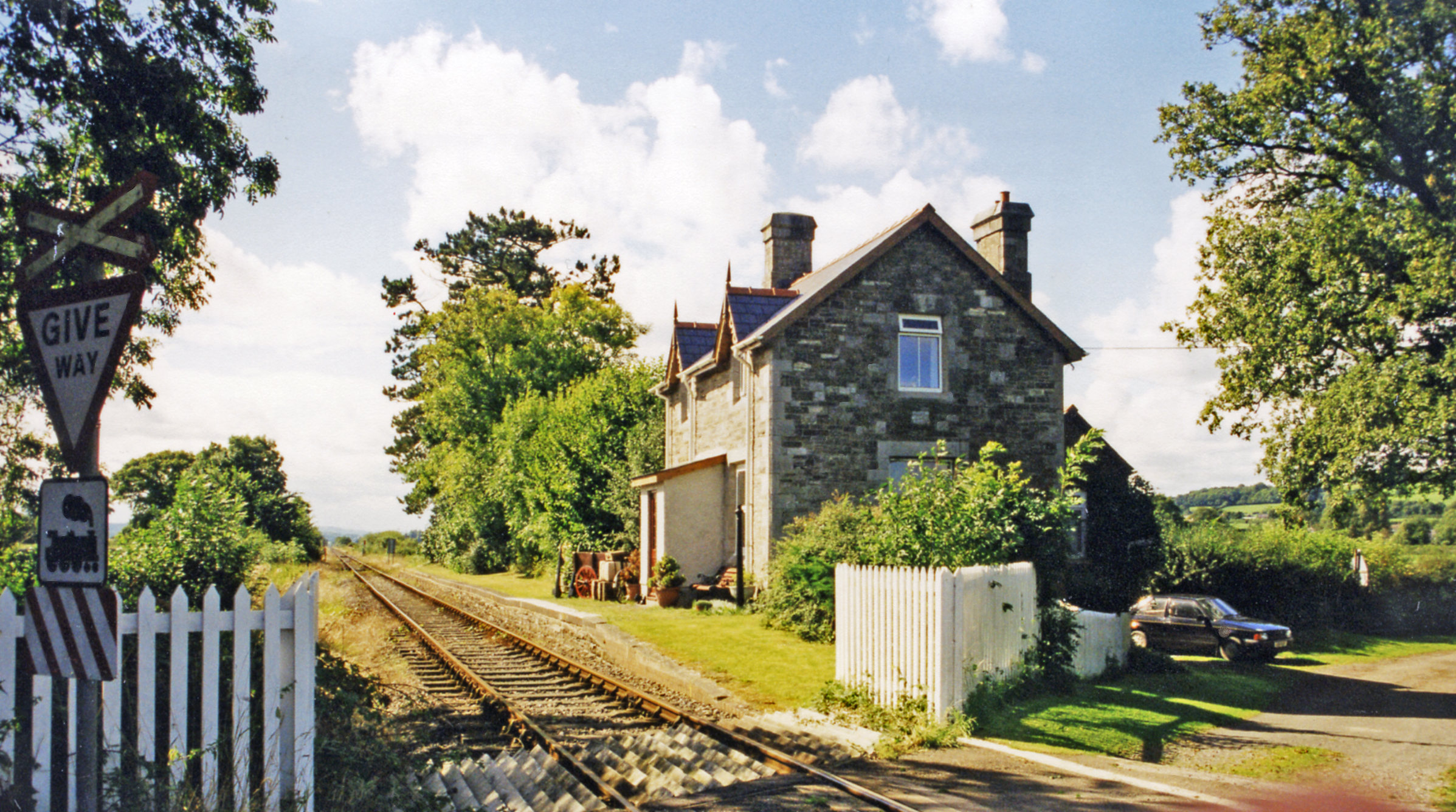
Glanrhyd station in 1999

The Swansea Vale Railway (SVR) had started life as a mineral line running north-east from Swansea. In 1861 it obtained an act of Parliament, the Swansea Vale Railway Extension Act 1861 (24 & 25 Vict. c. clxii), giving authorisation to extend to Brynamman, approaching from the east; this part of the line was known as the Swansea Vale Extension Railway, and it opened on 1 January 1864 for mineral traffic.

By the end of 1864 through operation between the Swansea Vale Extension and the Llanelly Railway was established at Brynamman, and the two lines formed a significant through route for goods traffic from Swansea to Liverpool. In May 1864 a passenger service to Brynamman was established on the Swansea Vale line. The Llanelly Railway and Dock Company decided to start its own passenger service to Brynamman, extending the existing Garnant branch service. The Board of Trade were asked to carry out the necessary formal inspection to approve passenger working, but the proposed method of operation, by telegraph and block system, was not considered safe for passenger operation on a single line. A further inspection in March 1865 noted that the terminus station at Brynamman was to be on a gradient of 1-in-57, an arrangement also considered unsafe, and authorisation was again postponed.

Authorisation for passenger working on the Llanelly line was given on 20 March 1865; it is not recorded how the considerable gradient easement was achieved. It appears that the two companies had their Brynamman stations alongside one another. The Llanelly Railway and Dock Company announced that passenger services would start on 20 March 1865; Garnant station appears to have been closed, and was relocated "half a mile down the branch" and re-opened at the same time. The SVR was authorised to open its passenger service to Brynamman on 27 February 1868, and agreement was reached for interchange arrangements at the station. The Swansea Vale Railway was absorbed by the Midland Railway.

== Llanelly Railway and Dock network ==
The sequence of stations at Llanelly developed over time; the first (1839) station was close to the dock, on the direct line from Llandilo. In 1852 a platform was opened adjacent to the newly opened South Wales Railway station, reached by a line on from the earlier station by a westward sweep close to the dock itself, then running for some distance immediately on the south side of the South Wales Railway main line, which was broad gauge at this time.

The connecting line towards the SWR station was made more direct, and a third "Dock" station opened in 1869 replacing the first station.

In this period, trains called at both stations, referred to as "Llanelly" and "Dock" (or "Llanelly Docks") in timetables respectively. In 1879, the layout and station arrangements were simplified, as described below.

== Reaching Swansea and Carmarthen ==
Throughout this period, Swansea had been growing in importance as an industrial centre, and its docks had been much extended and enhanced. At the same time Llanelly Dock had stagnated, and its limitations were evident. The Swansea Vale extension line to Brynamman (aligned to the Midland Railway) and the South Wales Railway (by now absorbed by the Great Western Railway) gave easy access for local industry to Swansea, to the disadvantage of Llanelli. At the same time Carmarthen was an important centre in its own right, and the importance of the harbours on Milford Haven was growing. The Llanelly Railway and Dock Company (LR&DC) could not afford to ignore the potential of a connection to Swansea and Carmarthen, even though it would diminish the value of its own dock.

Since the company was short of capital, the way forward had to include a means of financing the new lines. On successive days in October 1860, rival entrepreneurs waited on the Llanelly Board with proposals for connecting the line. Richard Kyrke Penson, Thomas Savin and a man named Johns proposed that the LR&DC promote railways from Pontardulais to Swansea, from Llandilo to Carmarthen, and from Llandovery to Brecon, which they would finance. Accordingly, they would take a ten-year lease of the Llanelly Railway and Dock; at the time the LR&DC was only earning 1% and an apparently guaranteed 4% (after five years) appeared very attractive. The following day Henry Robertson appeared proposing joint construction of the Swansea and Carmarthen lines with the Central Wales Railway, and running powers over the Central Wales line from Craven Arms, not far from Shrewsbury on the Shrewsbury and Hereford Railway.

The LR&DC directors favoured Penson and his partners, and the arrangement was agreed at a shareholders' extraordinary general meeting on 31 October 1860. The partners soon turned out to be insubstantial, as Johns and then Savin withdrew.

Having lost their source of finance and project management, the LR&DC proceeded with the Swansea and Carmarthen lines themselves, running into considerable practical and financial difficulties from landowners and otherwise in the process. The Central Wales Extension Railway was naturally keen for the lines to be completed, and it facilitated friendly contact with the London and North Western Railway (LNWR) and the LR&DC; could not the LNWR finance the new railways; in fact would not full amalgamation be desirable?

Proposals were worked up for a new line from Pontardulais to Swansea, taking a southern sweep through Dunvant, where there were said to be extensive unworked coal measures. There was to be a branch from that line to Penclawdd. A second line was to run from Llandilo back to Carmarthen, joining the Carmarthen and Cardigan Railway (C&CR) at a junction at Abergwili, a mile or so north of Carmarthen. The C&CR was broad gauge at that time, and a third rail to make mixed gauge would need to be laid.

Llanelly Railway (New Lines) Act 1861
- Act of Parliament
- Parliament of the United Kingdom
- Long title: An Act for authorizing the Llanelly Railway and Dock Company to make and maintain additional Lines of Railway, and to raise further Monies; and for other Purposes.
- Citation: 24 & 25 Vict. c. ccxvi

Dates
- Royal assent: 1 August 1861

Notwithstanding considerable opposition, the Llanelly Railway (New Lines) Act 1861 (24 & 25 Vict. c. ccxvi) was passed on 1 August authorising these routes. The act separated the company for financial purposes into two undertakings, the "Original Line", and the "New Lines" (the Swansea line and the Carmarthen line). This seems not to have been intended for any other purpose than clarity of accounting, but it was later to encourage an unforeseen separation.

The line at Swansea was to divide there, the passenger terminal being at a low level, and a high level line was to continue to the docks, crossing the River Tawe.

== Opening to Carmarthen ==
Construction of the line was considered to offer no great difficulty, but the Board of Trade inspector's report of May 1865 required considerable improvements before opening.

The company dragged its feet over complying with even trifling improvements required, and moreover started running passenger excursion trains on 29 May 1865 (to an Eisteddfod), and a regular passenger service from 1 June 1865. First goods trains ran on 8 or 14 November 1865. (Note: Barrie and Baughan say 14 November 1865 in "South Wales" and Baughan says 14 November 1864 in "North and Mid Wales")

The line diverged from the old main line at Carmarthen Valley Junction; stations were at Golden Grove, Llanarthney and Abergwili and also Llandilo Bridge and Nantgaredig. Income on the line was seriously less than had been planned for, and in particular the lucrative through traffic to western harbours was disappointing.

== Opening to Swansea ==
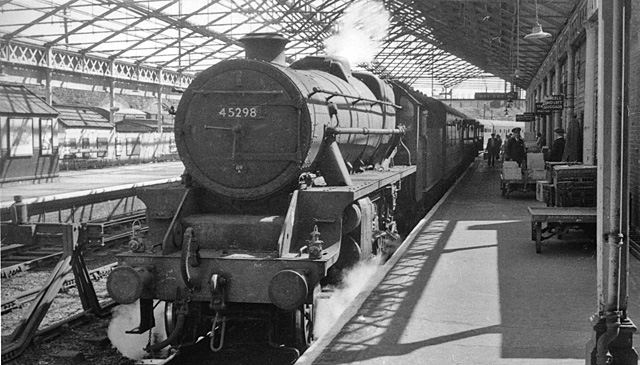
A former LMS Stanier Black 5 at Swansea Victoria.

On 9 November 1865 mineral traffic started on the Swansea line, although volumes were small at first. (Note: Denman; in a caption to an image on page 73 he says that "goods" traffic started in January 1866. MacDermot agrees January 1866.) The failure of the financing scheme had forced the Llanelly Railway and Dock Company into borrowing at high rates of interest. Moreover, the poor income on the Carmarthen line further reduced the company's trading situation. The New Lines section of the LR&DC, which was separately financed, was plunged into financial difficulty, and it went into administration in January 1867.

Passenger operation on the Swansea line started on 14 December 1867. The first through train from Llandovery to Swansea ran on 1 January 1868. The Penclawdd branch from Gower Road at the same time to serve local collieries (and later the Elba steel works).

== The London and North Western Railway outmanoeuvres the Llanelly Railway and Dock Company ==
In July 1867 Richard Moon of the LNWR and some other directors made a tour of Wales, during which they met the directors of the Llanelly Railway and Dock Company. The Llanelly proposed offering running powers over their line in return for financial help from the LNWR. Moon was an astute negotiator, and did not disclose the LNWR's wish to gain access for LNWR traffic on the Central Wales line to and from Swansea. He simply agreed to consider the Llanelly proposal. Meanwhile, the lease of the Vale of Towy line was nearing its full term and had to be renegotiated. The Vale of Towy was naturally playing off possible lessees against one another, and was looking for a hefty cash lease charge; cash which the Llanelly could not find. The consequence was that the LNWR shared the lease with the LR&DC, paid off some Llanelly debt, and accepted the offer of running powers, at a stroke getting LNWR access to Swansea and Carmarthen as well as Llanelly and Brynamman.

== The big companies take over ==
Swansea and Carmarthen Railways Act 1871
- Act of Parliament
- Parliament of the United Kingdom
- Long title: An Act to vest the Swansea and Carmarthen Lines Undertakings of the Llanelly Railway and Dock Company in a new Company, and to confer powers upon both the said Companies with reference to their respective undertakings; and for other purposes.
- Citation: 34 & 35 Vict. c. xlvi

Dates
- Royal assent: 16 June 1871

Text of statute as originally enacted

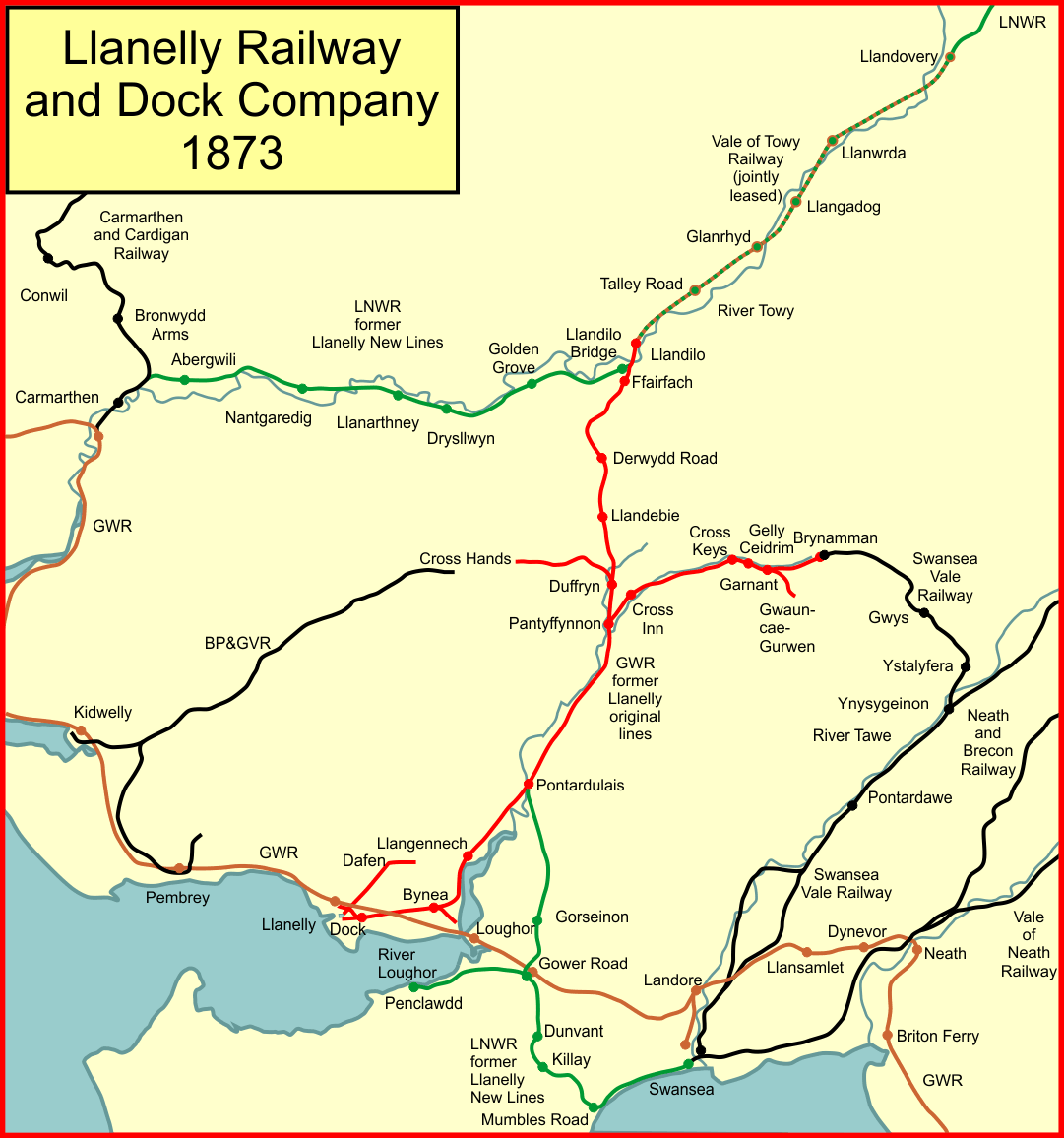
The Llanelly Railway and Dock network after the separation of the New Lines in 1873

The New Lines being in receivership, there arose criticisms that the solvent original line was funding the deficit of the New Lines, and a receiver, John Henry Koch, was appointed in 1870. He moved to create a truly independent company, the Swansea and Carmarthen Railways Company (S&CR), which was incorporated on 16 June 1871 by the Swansea and Carmarthen Railways Act 1871 (34 & 35 Vict. c. xlvi). The New Lines were worked by the LNWR from 1 July 1871.

A series of petty disputes over working arrangements and charges arose, and the LNWR announced that it (through the Swansea and Carmarthen Railway) would start operating the train service on the Vale of Towy line.

The Great Western Railway converted the gauge of its lines in South Wales in 1872, in a massive operation. The former obstruction to through operation, most important for mineral traffic, was removed. The Llanelly Railway and Dock Company observed that the Swansea and Carmarthen Railway, which it had created itself, was aligned to the LNWR, and the Llanelly had become a smaller network and felt itself vulnerable.

At the same time the GWR observed that the LNWR now had access to Swansea, and saw that if the LR&DC failed its lines would fall into the hands of the LNWR. Accordingly, an agreement was struck, whereby the GWR took over the LR&DC's original lines from 1 January 1873. Ordinary Llanelly shareholders were to receive 5% dividends paid by the GWR, rising to 5.5% from 1877. The LR&DC had retained a share (with the LNWR) of the lease of the Vale of Towy, and that line now became joint between the GWR and the LNWR.

Swansea and Carmarthen and London and North-western Railway Act 1873
- Act of Parliament
- Parliament of the United Kingdom
- Long title: An Act for the transfer of the Swansea Lines Undertaking of the Swansea and Carmarthen Railways Company to the London and North-western Railway Company; and for authorising that Company to raise Moneys; and for other purposes.
- Citation: 36 & 37 Vict. c. cxciii

Dates
- Royal assent: 21 July 1873

Text of statute as originally enacted

The antagonism between the S&CR and the LR&DC (or between the LNWR and the GWR) grew over the following period to the point where passengers and goods customers were seriously inconvenienced. The matter was finally brought to a close when the LNWR acquired the Swansea line in 1873 (authorised by the Swansea and Carmarthen and London and North-western Railway Act 1873 (36 & 37 Vict. c. cxciii) of 1 July). The LNWR operated four passenger and three goods trains a day to Swansea, as well as two goods trains to Llanelly.

Central Wales and Carmarthen Junction Railway Act 1873
- Act of Parliament
- Parliament of the United Kingdom
- Long title: An Act to abandon the Mumbles Extension of the Swansea and Carmarthen Railway Company, and to extend the time for the compulsory purchase of Land and completion of Railway of the Company at Carmarthen, to confer powers upon the Company with reference to the Undertakings of other Companies; and for other purposes.
- Citation: 36 & 37 Vict. c. cciii

Dates
- Royal assent: 28 July 1873

Text of statute as originally enacted

This left the Carmarthen line as the only asset of the Swansea and Carmarthen line. As it had no significant income except as a through line, it was vulnerable commercially. By the Central Wales and Carmarthen Junction Railway Act 1873 (36 & 37 Vict. c. cciii) it changed its name to the Central Wales and Carmarthen Junction Railway (CW&CJR). The little company decided to be robust in its dealings with the LNWR and a dispute led to the LNWR discontinuing working of local traffic from 1 April 1880, only accepting passengers and goods from local stations to and from its own line. The antagonism dragged on for many years, finally being resolved when the CW&CJR sold its line to the LNWR for £137,500 cash, from 1 July 1891.

The LNWR extended the Penclawdd branch by 1 3/4 miles (2.8 km) to Llanmorlais in 1877 and a passenger service was started on 1 March 1884.

== The view from Euston ==
G. P. Neele, Superintendent of the line on the LNWR, had accompanied Richard Moon on the 1867 visit, and later recorded his view of the events:

Between the Great Western and the North Western a singular fate attended the Llanelly Railway. Amalgamations and absorption of small lines have been common enough but disintegration is unusual; in this case however it was carried out. The line from Llandovery to Llandilo became joint London and North Western and Great Western Railway:- the portion from Llandilo, Pantyffynnon and Pontardulais and thence to Llanelly became Great Western property:- from Pontardulais to Swansea the North Western were proprietors; running powers being exercised over the intervening distance to Llandilo.

The remaining portion of the Llanelly system ran from Llandilo Bridge to a junction at Abergwili with the Carmarthen line. This became North Western property, but between Llandilo and Llandilo Bridge there existed a piece of debatable ground about 3/4 mile (1.2 km) with disputed powers which led to some difficulties in 1871.

At Abergwili the line entered on a mixed gauge (1 1/2 miles or 2.4 kilometres) to Carmarthen and at that town reached the termination of the narrow gauge; the line thence to Carmarthen Junction where the Great Western was joined being exclusively broad gauge.

This Llanelly group of lines, all narrow gauge, was far from being up to date. The stations and platforms were dilapidated, the crossing loops short, the permanent way weak.

== Route simplification at Llanelly ==
The Llanelly Railway and Dock Company's passenger trains approached from the north-east and crossed the GWR (former South Wales Railway) main line obliquely on the level. The line then ran on to a Llanelly Dock station. In 1879 a connecting spur was laid in at the point of intersection, and approaching trains from Pontardulais joined the GWR main line and ran to the GWR station.

On Monday, the Llanelly Dock Passenger Station will be closed by the Great Western Railway Company, and, in future, passengers will only be booked at Llanelly station. This will be a convenience as far as booking per London and North Western route is concerned, as, previously, passengers had to proceed to the dock to get their tickets, but passengers to and from the dock will, in future, have to tramp it, unless some of our buses take up the matter and run down there. Here is a good opening for a tramway.

== After 1879 ==
The Vale of Towy Railway was jointly leased by the GWR and the LNWR; in 1884 that was converted to full joint ownership; the Vale of Towy was vested in the GWR and LNWR jointly by the London and North Western Railway Act 1884 (47 & 48 Vict. c. ccvii) of 28 July 1884.

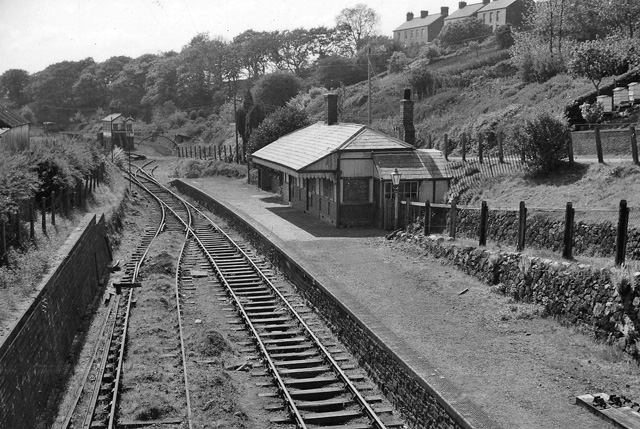
The 1886 Brynamman West Station in 1962

The Llanelly Railway station at Brynamman had always been cramped and inconvenient; in 1886 the GWR opened a new station to the west of the main road. It continued in use until passenger services were withdrawn in 1958.

Great Western Railway and Llanelly Railway and Dock Companies Amalgamation Act 1889
- Act of Parliament
- Parliament of the United Kingdom
- Long title: An Act for amalgamating the Llanelly Railway and Dock Company with the Great Western Railway Company.
- Citation: 52 & 53 Vict. c. xxxiii

Dates
- Royal assent: 24 June 1889

Text of statute as originally enacted

Having been leased by the GWR, the Llanelly Railway and Dock Company was fully absorbed by that company on 1 July 1889 by the Great Western Railway and Llanelly Railway and Dock Companies Amalgamation Act 1889 (52 & 53 Vict. c. xxxiii). Correspondingly the Central Wales and Carmarthen Junction Railway was vested in the LNWR by the London and North-western Railway Act 1891 (54 & 55 Vict. c. cxxxvii) of 21 July 1891.

The line between Swansea and Pontardulais was doubled by the LNWR by 1894 The very basic Swansea passenger station erected by the LR&DC was modernised and improved by the LNWR in 1882.

== The 20th century ==
The St Davids colliery, which had been the original purpose of the first Llanelly Railroad and Dock Company, was no longer the principal location for coal extraction in the area, and the incline operation was inconvenient. In 1903 the line was diverted from Dafen to new collieries at Penprys and Acorn Pits, and the St Davids incline was closed.

The first line to collieries at Gwaun-cae-Gurwen similarly involved difficult incline operation, and the GWR obtained an the Great Western Railway Act 1904 (4 Edw. 7. c. cxcvii) authorising a new line avoiding the inclined plane. It opened on 4 November 1907; it had a 1-in-40 ruling gradient. Two halts were opened on the new line, and railmotors operated a passenger service from 1 January 1908 to 1 May 1926. There were eight trips a day. The passenger service was suspended during the General Strike of 1926 and never resumed. The earlier line was shortened back in 1933, becoming known as the Cawdor branch, and was later used chiefly for wagon storage.

For many years the Great Western Railway had suffered from congestion in the Swansea area; a particular difficulty was the severe gradients at Cockett which required heavy trains to be banked and resulted in lengthy line occupation times. In the early years of the twentieth century consideration was given to relieving the issue, and the decision was taken to construct what became the Swansea District Line. This long new line left the main line near Briton Ferry and looped round to the north of Swansea, joining the Llanelly line near Bynea.

To give good access for colliery traffic, there was a triangular junction there, so that coal traffic from the Amman valley could turn east on to the new line; at the same time express passenger trains (particularly Fishguard boat trains) could avoid Swansea using the line. The work was authorised on 15 August 1904, and opened throughout on 14 July 1913.

In 1913 the GWR undertook improvements to the line between Pontardulais and Llanelly, providing double track, and widening the connection at Llandilo Junction by the provision of a new line from Genwen Junction to Llandilo Jn. (Pontardulais tunnel remained single).

Throughout the first decades of the 20th century, use of Llanelly Dock (now known as the Great Western Dock) declined; Swansea dock was nearer the centre of industry and was much enlarged and modernised over the years and Llanelly slowly became eclipsed.

The Gwaun-cae-Gurwen improvements of 1907 had been followed up by obtaining powers on 18 August 1911 to build a through line from there to Felin Fran on the Swansea District Line, intended to further enhance the access to pits in the area. The line was partly constructed but never opened, due to World War I. However, in September 1922 the GWR opened the Cwmgorse branch southward from Gwaun-cae-Gurwen to Duke Colliery; this was a short stub of the through line. In 1960 the branch was further extended to Abernant Colliery by British Railways, and the branch continued in use until 1980.

== From 1923 ==
At the beginning of 1923 the main line railways of Great Britain were "grouped" under the terms of the Railways Act 1921. The LNWR was a constituent of the new London Midland and Scottish Railway group (LMS); the Great Western Railway absorbed numerous smaller concerns but continued in the same identity as before.

The LMS closed the Llanmorlais branch passenger service on 5 January 1931 and total closure of the branch followed on 2 September 1957.

Emlyn colliery on the Mountain branch closed about 1947 and the upper part of the branch fell into decline; the branches serving collieries were almost entirely dependent on the mining, and when that declined and moved away, the branches suffered accordingly.

After World War II following nationalisation, from the beginning of 1948 British Railways owned the railways in the area. The decline in mining continued and Cross Hands goods closed on 1 November 1950; the whole branch closed on 6 March 1963.

Llanelly Harbour Trust had taken control of the Great Western Dock at Llanelli, but a review of port facility requirements in the area resulted in closure, and the Trust ceased trading in 1951. In due course the GWR Dock was filled in.

Steam operation on the Llanelly network ceased in 1963

The St Davids line, serving Dafen and beyond, closed completely on 4 March 1963.

The Brynamman passenger service was closed on 18 August 1958, and completely 28 September 1964. The Midland Railway station at Brynamman had closed 8 years earlier to passengers, on 25 September 1950.

The Carmarthen line closed on 9 September 1963.

The line from Pontardulais to Swansea closed to passengers on 15 June 1964, and from this date the passenger service on the Central Wales Line ran from Llanelli (later extended back to Swansea) to Shrewsbury. On 10 August 1964 the Central Wales line closed to through goods traffic, and to local freight in 1968. After closure of the Swansea line a section south from Pontardulais to Gorseinon colliery was retained. On 22 September 1974 a spur was opened onto Swansea District line enabling closure of the Pontardulais line.

Glanamman remained open for goods traffic until 30 January 1965. Llandilo Jn to Morfa Jn and most dock lines at Llanelly closed on 24 January 1966.

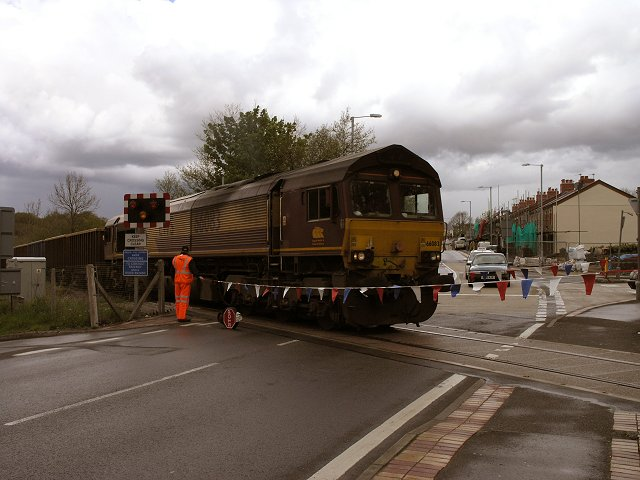
A modern coal train at Gwaun-Cae-Gurwen level crossing

The sole remaining colliery branch line was the line to Gwaun-cae-Gurwen. For some years this was dormant but in 2012 traffic started again, transporting coal required for blending purposes. In view of the discontinuation of coal firing in the country it is likely that this traffic will not continue. (2016)

== Gradients ==
Gradients on the main line from Llanelli to Llandilo were significant, climbing at 1 in 157 to 1 in 108 for several miles to a summit at Derwydd Road, then falling at 1 in 108 for two miles (3.2 km) to Ffairfach. Derwydd Road at 229 feet (69.8 m) is the third highest point on the Central Wales Line.

The Pontardulais to Swansea line was undulating with stiff alternating gradients; Dunvant was approached by 1 1/2 miles (2.4 km) at 1 in 72 eastbound and two miles (3.2 km) /at 1 in 70 and 1 in 80 westbound. The Carmarthen line was gently graded all the way.

== Chronology ==
=== Dafen Line ===
Goods and minerals only

- Llanelly Dock;
- Dafen;
- St Davids Colliery.

=== Penprys Colliery Extension 1903 – 1963 ===
- Dafen;
- Penprys Colliery;
- Acorn Colliery.

=== Llanelly SWR ===
- Llanelly (Llanelly Rly station, narrow gauge); opened April 1853; closed 1 September 1879 when services were diverted over the former SWR main line to the SWR station

=== Llandilo Line ===
- Llanelly Dock South Side;
- Llanelly Dock (station); opened 1840; closed 1 September 1879;
- Bynea; opened 1840;
- Llangennech; opened 1841;
- Morlais Junction;
- Hendy Junction;
- Pontardulais; opened 1840; renamed Pontarddulais 1971;
- Pantyffynnon; opened 1841;
- Parcyrhun Halt; opened 4 May 1936; closed 13 June 1955;
- Duffryn; opened 1840; renamed Tirydail 1889; renamed Ammanford & Tirydail 1960; renamed Ammanford 1973;
- Llandebie; opened 26 January 1857; renamed Llandybie 1971;
- Derwydd Road; opened 26 January 1857; closed 3 May 1954;
- Ffairfach; opened 26 January 1857;
- Carmarthen Valley Junction;
- Llandilo; opened 26 January 1857; renamed Llandeilo 1971.

=== Vale of Towy section ===
- Llandilo; above;
- Talley Road Halt; opened September 1859; closed 4 April 1955;
- Glanrhyd Halt; opened May 1858; closed 20 July 1931; reopened 19 December 1938; closed 7 March 1955;
- Llangadock; opened 1 April 1858; later Llangadog;
- Llanwrda; opened 1 April 1858;
- Llandovery; opened 1 April 1858.

=== Brynamman Line ===
- Pantyffynnon; above;
- Cross Inn; opened 10 April 1840; renamed Ammanford 1883;closed 18 August 1958;
- Ammanford Colliery Halt; opened 1 May 1905; closed 18 August 1958;
- Cross Keys; opened by May 1851; renamed Glanamman 1884; closed 18 August 1958;
- Gelli Ceidrim; opened November 1851; closed December 1861;
- Garnant; opened 1840; resited 1/2 mile (0.80 km) west 20 March 1865; closed 18 August 1958;
- Brynamman; new station opened 1886; renamed Brynamman West 1950; closed 18 August 1958;
- Brynamman; opened 1842; closed 1886.

=== Cawdor Branch ===
Mineral traffic only

- Garnant; above;
- Gwaun-cae-Gurwen collieries.

=== Gwaun-cae-Gurwen Branch ===
- Garnant; above;
- Garnant Halt; opened 1 January 1908; closed 2 April 1917; reopened 7 July 1919; closed 4 May 1926;
- Gors-y-Garnant Halt; opened 1 January 1908; closed 2 April 1917; reopened 7 July 1919; closed 4 May 1926;
- Red Lion Crossing Halt; opened 1 January 1908; closed 2 April 1917; reopened 7 July 1919; closed 4 May 1926;
- Gwaun-cae-Gurwen Halt; opened 1 January 1908; closed 2 April 1917; reopened 7 July 1919; closed 4 May 1926.

=== Cwmgorse Colliery Branch 1922 ===
- Junction near Gwaun-cae-Gurwen;
- Cwmgorse colliery;
- Abernant Colliery; (1960 extension British Railways).

=== Mountain Branch ===
Goods and minerals only

- Duffryn;
- Cross Hands.

=== Carmarthen line ===
- Abergwili Junction; junction with Carmarthen and Cardigan Railway;
- Abergwili; opened 1 June 1865; closed 9 September 1963;
- Whitemill; opened January 1867; closed October 1870;
- Nantgaredig; opened 1 June 1865; closed 9 September 1963;
- Llanarthney; opened 1 June 1865; closed 9 September 1963;
- Drysllwyn; opened November 1868; closed 9 September 1963;
- Golden Grove; opened 1 June 1865; closed 9 September 1963;
- Llandilo Bridge; opened 1 June 1865; closed 9 September 1963;
- Carmarthen Valley Junction; above.

=== Swansea Line ===
- Pontardulais; above;
- Grovesend; opened 1 January 1910; closed 6 June 1932;
- Loughor Common; opened 14 December 1867; renamed Gorseinon 1868; closed 15 June 1964;
- Gower Road; opened 14 December 1867; renamed Gowerton 1886; renamed Gowerton South 1950; closed 15 June 1964;
- Dunvant; opened April 1868; closed 15 June 1964;
- Killay; opened 14 December 1867; closed 15 June 1964;
- Mumbles Road; opened January 1868; closed 15 June 1964;
- Swansea Bay; opened 1 January 1879; closed 15 June 1964;
- Swansea Victoria; opened 14 December 1867; closed 15 June 1964;

=== Penclawdd Branch ===
- Gower Road; above;
- Penclawdd; opened December 1867; closed 5 January 1931;
- Llanmorlais; opened 1 March 1884; closed 5 January 1931.

== See also ==
The Great Western Railway in West Wales
