= Heart of Wales line =

Railway line in south-west Wales

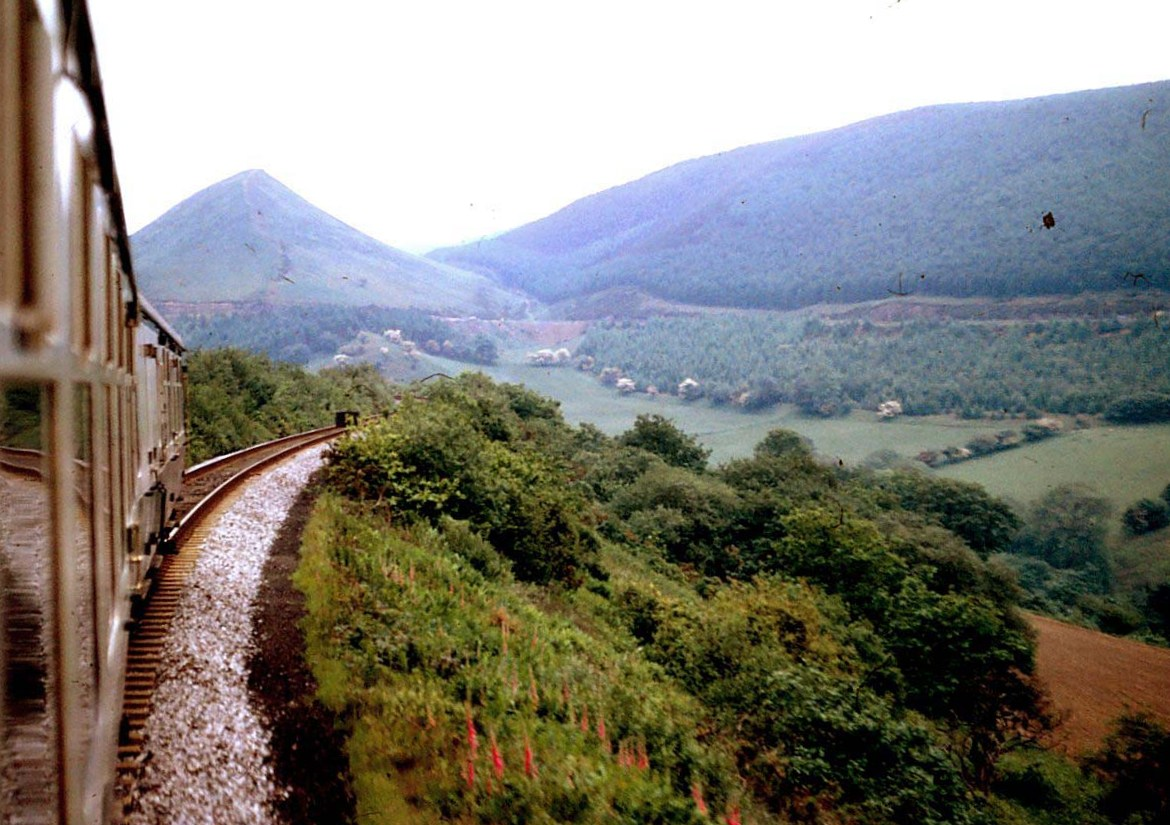
- The line south of Sugar Loaf station

Overview
- Other name(s): Heart of Wales Railway, Rheilffordd Calon Cymru
- Native name: Llinell Calon Cymru (Welsh)
- Owner: Network Rail
- Locale: South West Wales, Mid Wales, Shropshire
- Termini: Craven Arms; Llanelli
- Stations: 29

Service
- Type: Heavy rail
- System: National Rail
- Operator: Transport for Wales
- Rolling stock: Class 150 & Class 153 DMUs

History
- Opened: 1868

Technical
- Line length: 90 mi (145 km)
- Num of tracks: Mainly single track
- Character: Rural
- Track gauge: 4 ft 8 1/2 in (1,435 mm) standard gauge
- Electrification: None
- Operating speed: Max. 60 miles per hour (97 km/h)
Route map
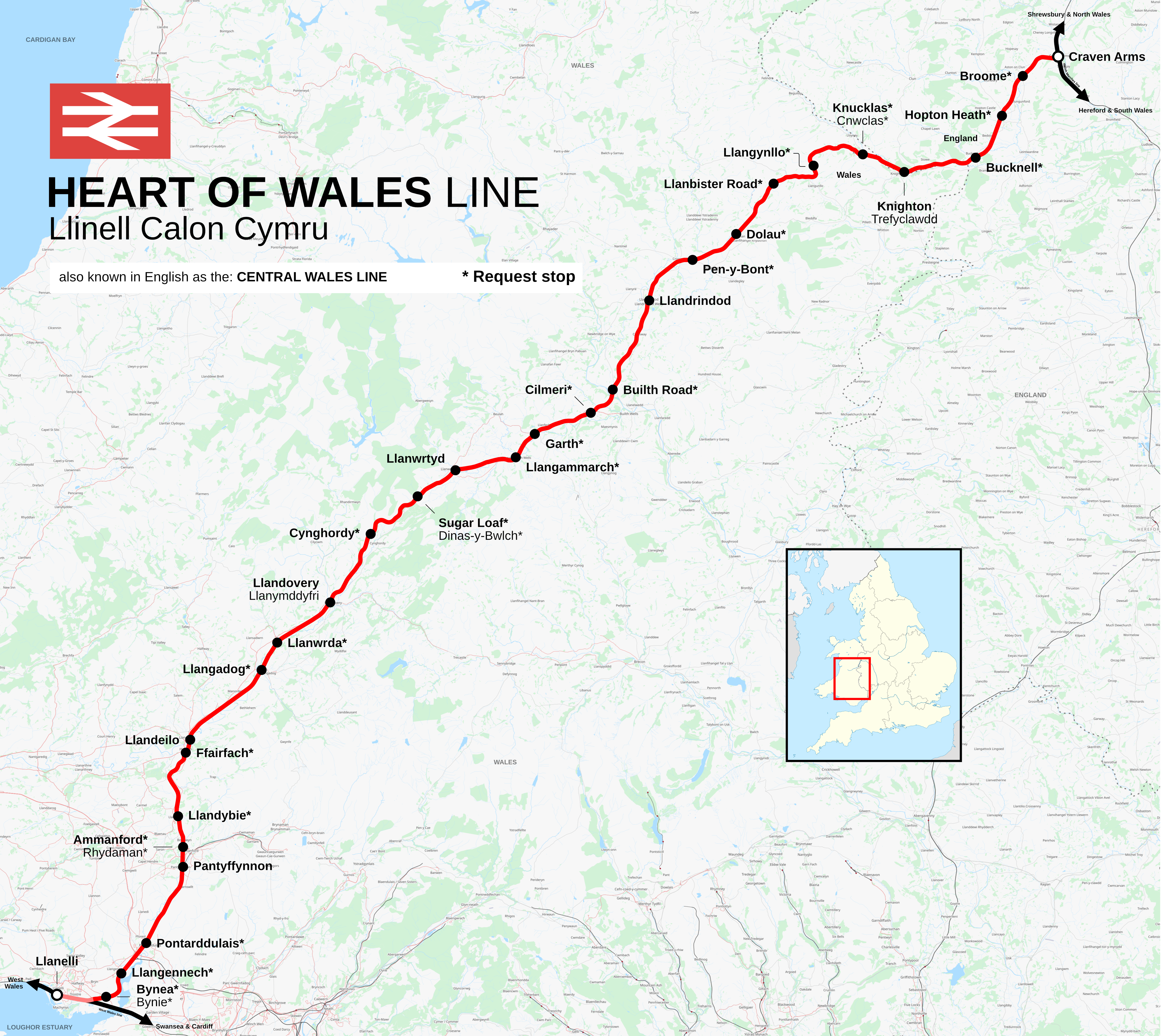

The Heart of Wales line (Welsh: Llinell Calon Cymru) is a railway line which connects Craven Arms in Shropshire to Llanelli in South West Wales. It serves a number of rural centres, including the 19th-century spa towns of Llandrindod Wells, Llangammarch Wells and Llanwrtyd Wells. At Builth Road, 2 miles (3.2 km) from the town of Builth Wells, the line crosses the former route of the earlier Mid Wales Railway, which closed in 1962.

== History ==
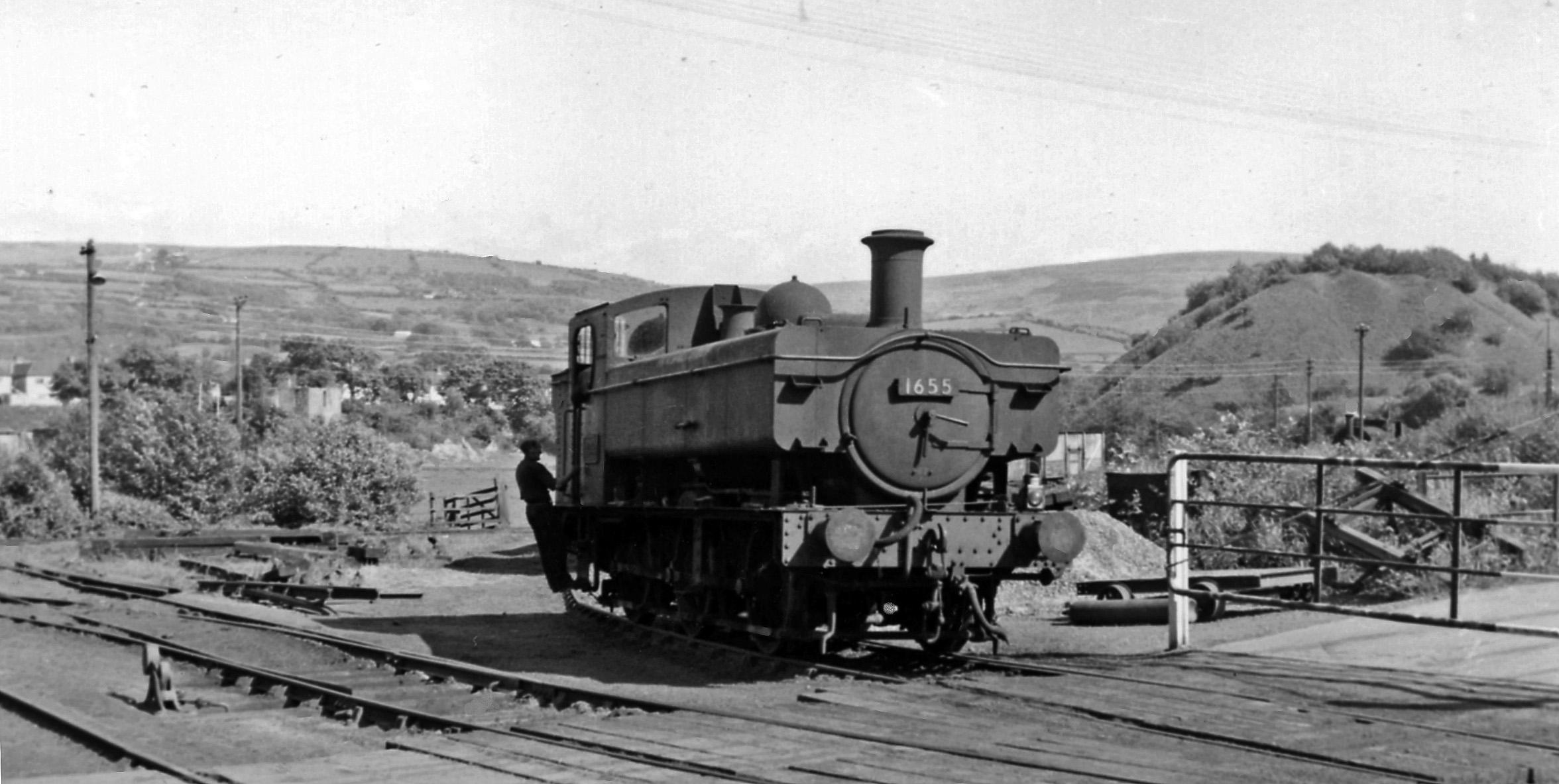
GW/WR Pannier Tank in sidings of Tirydail Colliery, near Ammanford (1962)

Historically, the line was known as the Central Wales line (Welsh: Rheilffordd Canol Cymru) (Note: Network Rail still uses this name in its infrastructure route nomenclature.) and also included routes through Gowerton, where the railway crossed the West Wales lines and ran through Dunvant and Killay then down through the Clyne Valley to Blackpill, and then along the sea wall to Swansea Bay, near to the former slip bridge, before finally reaching Swansea Victoria.

This section, built originally by the Llanelly Railway and Dock Company (LR) to compete with the Great Western Railway and break the monopoly they held on Swansea Dock, closed in 1964. Nationalisation of the railways had removed the need for competing routes, and the running down and closure of Swansea North Dock ended the need for freight services on this section. Trains now use the original LR main line to reach the West Wales lines at Llandeilo Junction and thence Llanelli and Swansea, after a reversal.

Knighton Railway Act 1858
- Act of Parliament
- Parliament of the United Kingdom
- Long title: An Act for making a Railway from the Craven Arms Station of the Shrewsbury and Hereford Railway in the County of Salop to the Borough of Knighton in the County of Radnor; and for other Purposes.
- Citation: 21 & 22 Vict. c. xix

Dates
- Royal assent: 21 May 1858

Central Wales Railway Act 1859
- Act of Parliament
- Parliament of the United Kingdom
- Long title: An Act for making a Railway from Knighton to Llandrindod in the County of Radnor, to be called "The Central Wales Railway," and for other Purposes.
- Citation: 22 & 23 Vict. c. cxxi

Dates
- Royal assent: 13 August 1859

Central Wales Extension Railway Act 1860
- Act of Parliament
- Parliament of the United Kingdom
- Long title: An Act for making a Railway from Llandrindod in the County of Radnor to Llandovery in the County of Carmarthen, to be called "The Central Wales Extension Railway;" and for other Purposes.
- Citation: 23 & 24 Vict. c. cxli

Dates
- Royal assent: 3 July 1860

Central Wales Extension Railway Act 1863
- Act of Parliament
- Parliament of the United Kingdom
- Long title: An Act for enabling the Central Wales Extension Railway Company to raise additional Capital; to make working and other Agreements with the London and North-western Railway Company; and for other Purposes.
- Citation: 26 & 27 Vict. c. lxxvii

Dates
- Royal assent: 22 June 1863

Text of statute as originally enacted

North of Llandovery, the route was opened in stages between 1861 and 1868 by a number of different companies, all backed by the London and North Western Railway (LNWR):

- the Knighton Railway, authorised by the Knighton Railway Act 1858 (21 & 22 Vict. c. xix)
- the Central Wales Railway, authorised by the Central Wales Railway Act 1859 (22 & 23 Vict. c. cxxi)
- the Central Wales Extension Railway, authorised by the Central Wales Extension Railway Act 1860 (23 & 24 Vict. c. cxli).

Central Wales Railway Act 1863
- Act of Parliament
- Parliament of the United Kingdom
- Long title: An Act for the Amalgamation of the Knighton and the Central Wales Railway Companies; for authorizing Arrangements between those Companies, or either of them, and the London and North-western Railway Company; and for other Purposes.
- Citation: 26 & 27 Vict. c. lxxix

Dates
- Royal assent: 22 June 1863

Text of statute as originally enacted

The Knighton Railway and the Central Wales Railway were given permission to amalgamate by the Central Wales Railway Act 1863 (26 & 27 Vict. c. lxxix).

London and North Western Railway (Knighton, Central Wales and Central Wales Extension Railways Transfer) Act 1868
- Act of Parliament
- Parliament of the United Kingdom
- Long title: An Act for vesting the several Undertakings of the Knighton, the Central Wales, and the Central Wales Extension Railway Companies in the London and North-Western Railway Company; and for other Purposes.
- Citation: 31 & 32 Vict. c. xxxviii

Dates
- Royal assent: 25 June 1868

Text of statute as originally enacted

The Knighton Railway Company, Central Wales Railway Company and the Central Wales Extension Railway Company were merged into the LNWR by the London and North Western Railway (Knighton, Central Wales and Central Wales Extension Railways Transfer) Act 1868 (31 & 32 Vict. c. xxxviii).

=== 20th century onwards ===
The 1963 Beeching Report proposed that the entire Central Wales line be closed but this was refused by the Ministry of Transport, except for the Pontarddulais to Swansea Victoria section. As a rural branch line, it survived the Beeching Axe since it carried freight traffic to the steelworks at Bynea and industrial areas such as Ammanford and Pontarddulais, linking them with the docks at Llanelli. It also passed through six marginal constituencies. During engineering work, the line is still occasionally used as a diversionary freight route. The basic service over the line has remained more or less constant since the 1970s, with four or five trains per day in each direction on weekdays, and two or three on Sundays.

The line is single track throughout, except for a few miles at the southern end shared with the Swansea District line, and has been operated under a light railway order since 1972. There are five passing loops, at Llandeilo, Llandovery, Llanwrtyd, Llandrindod and Knighton. Unless "Out of Course" working occurs, the Llanwrtyd passing loop is used on two of the Monday-Saturday services and the Llandrindod passing loop is used on the other two and also on the Sunday services. The signalling was modernised in 1986, when a system known as No Signalman Token Remote working was introduced. This is overseen by the signaller at Pantyffynnon, with the token instruments at the aforementioned five passing loops being operated by the train crew. The surviving signal boxes at each station were closed, as part of the modernisation scheme, and the points converted to automatic operation by British Rail.

For more than two years, only two of the loops (Llandrindod and Llanwrtyd) were operational as Network Rail (NR) was unable to source spare parts for the points mechanisms used at all five: the design used is now obsolete. Parts had to be taken from the three decommissioned loops to keep the other two operational. In 2009, NR stated its intention to install new conventional electric point machines at all five loops and restore the three out-of-service ones to full working order; this was after being heavily criticised by the chairman of the South Wales branch of Railfuture at the organisation's annual general meeting. But they could not give a timescale for this work as design work on the new equipment was still ongoing. NR began the replacement works for the points after first installing the system on the line to Pembroke Dock, at the Tenby loop on 7 December 2009, and then making minor alterations in February 2010. Llandeilo was the first station on the line to be modernised, the rest followed. The £5 million project was completed in October 2010.

In 2014, Network Rail added exit indicators at the trailing end of each loop to aid in the reversing of services; a decision taken so that all moves have an active indication of the status of the motor points.

=== Incidents ===
In 1987, tragedy struck the line near Llandeilo when the Glanrhyd Bridge collapsed following heavy flooding and an early morning northbound train plunged into the swollen River Towy, killing four people. For a while, the future of the line was in doubt; the equally rural Carmarthen-Aberystwyth line had been closed in 1965 following serious flood damage as the cost of repairs was deemed unacceptable. Political forces of all sides rallied to ensure the line's survival.

== Route ==
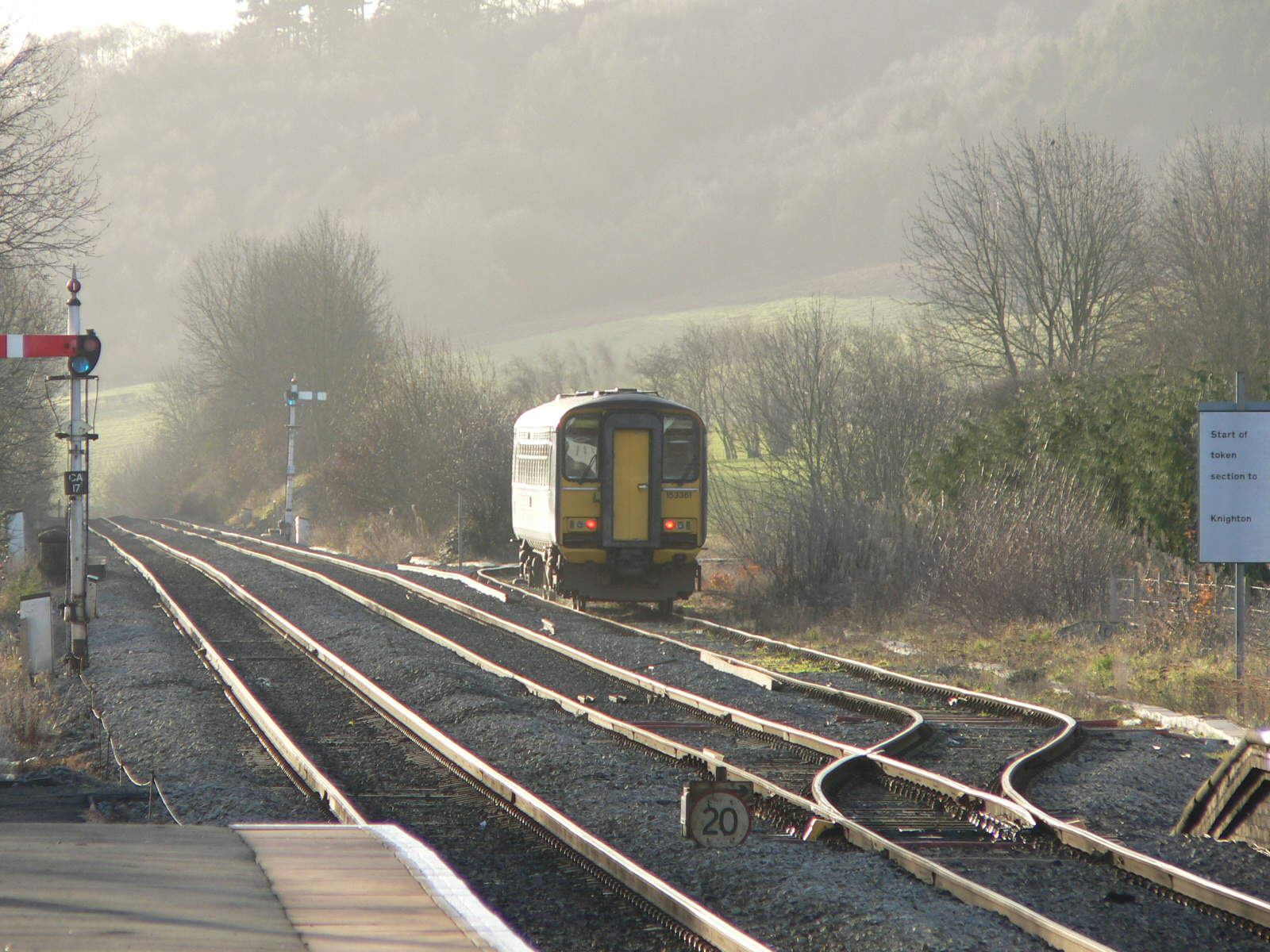
The start of the line at Craven Arms, where it diverges from the Welsh Marches line

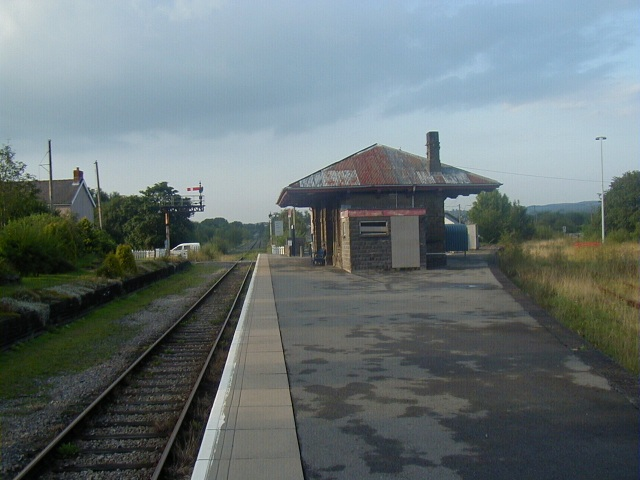
Pantyffynnon railway station

After leaving the West Wales Line at Llandeilo Junction, east of Llanelli, the route is shared with the Swansea District line as far as Morlais Junction, which was the site of a serious oil train derailment in the summer of 2020. It then passes beneath the M4 motorway and turns northwards towards Pontarddulais and Pantyfynnon. The short tunnel before the former station is the oldest surviving example still in use in Wales, dating from 1839, whilst the freight-only branch along the Amman valley to Gwaun-Cae-Gurwen diverges at the latter.

North of Ammanford, it follows the valley of the River Tywi north to Llandeilo, formerly the junction for Carmarthen, and then Llandovery, crossing the river at Glanrhyd by a replacement single-span bridge that was built and commissioned in 1988. North of Llandovery, the character of the route changes, as it ascends into the Carmarthenshire hills towards the first of the line's two major summits at Sugar Loaf, 820 feet (250 m) above sea level, on gradients as steep as 1 in 60.

En route, it passes over the 283 yards (259 m) long Cynghordy Viaduct across the Afon Bran valley, before crossing the county boundary into Powys through the 1,001 yards (915 m) summit tunnel beneath the Black Mountain range. A descent at 1 in 70-80 follows to Llanwrtyd Wells along the valley of the River Irfon, from where it continues via Builth Road to Llandrindod Wells, which is the largest settlement on the line.

From Llandrindod, the line climbs steadily once more, skirting the Radnor Forest as it heads for the remote station at Llanbister Road, some 5 miles (8 km) distant from the village it is named after. It then passes another summit near Llangynllo Tunnel, the highest point on the route at 980 feet (300 m) above sea level. There then follows a 4.6 miles (7.4 km) descent to Knucklas, again at mostly 1 in 60, where the line is carried above the village on a 193 yards (176 m) viaduct with ornate castellated turrets at each end.

It then heads to Knighton, where the station is in England but the town it serves is mostly in Wales. The last portion of the route then runs through south-west Shropshire, along the valleys of the rivers Teme and Clun to join the main Welsh Marches line at Craven Arms, from where trains continue north to terminate at Shrewsbury.

== Services ==
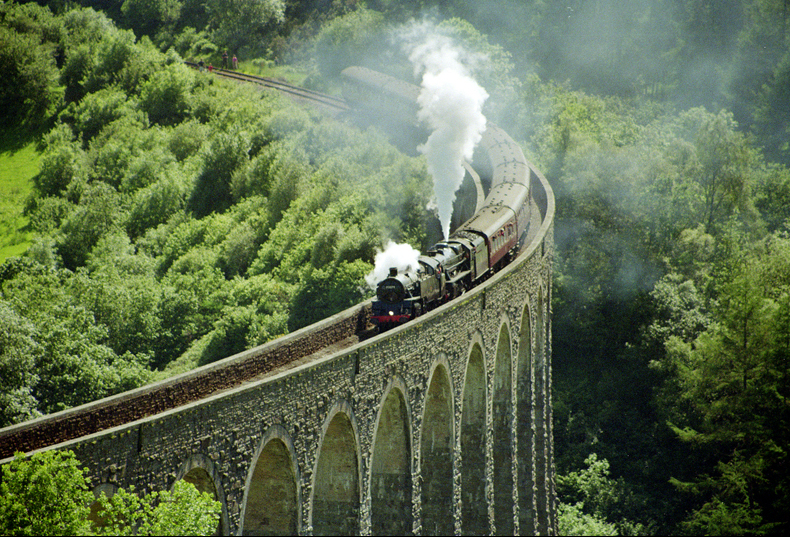
Train on Cynghordy Viaduct

The route is operated by Transport for Wales, which provides the following general off-peak services in trains per day (tpd):

- 6 tpd to Shrewsbury
- 5 tpd to Swansea.

Class 150 or Class 153 diesel multiple units are employed on the route. The continued use of Class 153s has received criticism, notably from Kirsty Williams MS, who said:

The 153 units have a poor reliability record, can carry few bicycles — which we desperately need to be carried on the line — little bulky luggage, and offer poor visibility; this on a line that is supposedly promoted as scenic.

The line has also been used for exceptional train movements, including:

- Manchester Piccadilly to Carmarthen trains diverted during engineering works between Briton Ferry and Bridgend
- Builth Road has special trains from Cardiff for the Royal Welsh Show, which operate via the Swansea District line between Briton Ferry and Pontarddulais
- Charter trains taking in the scenery along the route, such as The Welshman charter.

== Community rail ==
The line is designated as a community rail partnership.

== See also ==
- Railways of Shropshire
- History of Wales
- Royal Welsh Show
- Heart of Wales Line Trail
