= List of closed railway stations in Great Britain: G =

The list of closed railway stations in Great Britain includes the following: Year of closure is given if known. Stations reopened as heritage railways continue to be included in this list and some have been linked. Some stations have been reopened to passenger traffic. Some lines remain in use for freight and mineral traffic.

== G ==
=== Ga ===
| Station (Town, unless in station name) | Rail company | Year closed | Notes |
|---|---|---|---|
| Gaerwen | L&NWR | 1966 | |
| Gagie | LM&SR | 1955 | |
| Gailes | Glasgow and South Western Railway | 1967 | |
| Gailey | L&NWR | 1951 | |
| Gainford | NER | 1964 | |
| Gairlochy | Highland Railway/North British Railway | 1933 | |
| Gaisgill | NER | 1952 | |
| Galashiels | North British Railway | 1969 | reopened 2015 |
| Galgate | Lancaster and Preston Junction Railway | 1939 | |
| Gallions | Eastern Counties Railway | 1940 | |
| Gallowgate | City of Glasgow Union Railway | 1902 | |
| Gallowgate Central | North British Railway | 1917 | |
| Galston | Glasgow and South Western Railway | 1964 | |
| Gamlingay | L&NWR | 1968 | |
| Ganton | NER | 1930 | |
| Gara Bridge | GWR | 1963 | |
| Gargunnock | NBR | 1934 | |
| Garlieston (1st) | Portpatrick and Wigtownshire Joint Railway | 1876 | |
| Garlieston (2nd) | Portpatrick and Wigtownshire Joint Railway | 1903 | |
| Garmouth | Great North of Scotland Railway | 1968 | |
| Garnant | GWR | 1958 | |
| Garnant Halt | GWR | 1926 | |
| Garndiffaith | L&NWR | 1941 | |
| Garneddwen | Corris Railway | 1931 | |
| Garneddwen Halt | GWR | 1965 | |
| Garngad | North British Railway | 1910 | |
| Garnkirk | Caledonian Railway | 1960 | |
| Garnqueen | Monklands Railway | 1851 | |
| Garn-yr-Erw | L&NWR | 1941 | |
| Garsdale | Midland Railway | 1970 | reopened 1986 |
| Garsington Bridge Halt | GWR | 1915 | later reopened as Morris Cowley |
| Garstang and Catterall | Lancaster and Preston Junction Railway | 1969 | |
| Garstang Road Halt | Garstang and Knot-End Railway | 1930 | |
| Garstang Town | Garstang and Knot-End Railway | 1930 | |
| Garston (Merseyside) | Cheshire Lines Committee | 2006 | |
| Garston Church Road | L&NWR | 1939 | |
| Garston Dock | L&NWR | 1947 | |
| Gartcosh | Caledonian | 1962 | reopened 2005 |
| Garth (Mid Glamorgan) | Port Talbot Railway | 1913 | |
| Garth and Van Road | Van Railway | 1879 | |
| Gartly | Great North of Scotland Railway | 1968 | |
| Gartmore | North British Railway | 1950 | |
| Gartness | North British Railway | 1934 | |
| Garton | NER | 1950 | |
| Gartsherrie | Monklands Railway | 1851 | |
| Gartsherrie | Garnkirk and Glasgow Railway | 1851 | |
| Gascoigne Wood Junction | NER | 1902 | |
| Gatcombe | GWR | 1869 | |
| Gateacre | Cheshire Lines Committee | 1972 | |
| Gatehead | Glasgow and South Western Railway | 1969 | |
| Gatehouse of Fleet | Portpatrick and Wigtownshire Joint Railway | 1965 | |
| Gateshead | NER | 1981 | |
| Gateshead West | NER | 1965 | |
| Gateside | North British Railway | 1950 | |
| Gatewen Halt | GWR | 1931 | |
| Gatwick Airport (opened as Tinsley Green) | Southern Railway | 1958 | new station opened 0.8mls north |
| Gayton Road | Midland and Great Northern Joint Railway | 1959 | |

=== Ge ===
| Station (Town, unless in station name) | Rail company | Year closed | Notes |
|---|---|---|---|
| Geddington | Midland Railway | 1948 | |
| Gedling and Carlton | GNR | 1960 | |
| Gedney | Midland and Great Northern Joint Railway | 1959 | |
| Geldeston | GER | 1953 | |
| Gelli Ceidrim | Llanelly Railway | 1861 | |
| Gelli Felen Halt | LM&SR | 1958 | |
| Gelli Platform | Taff Vale Railway | 1912 | |
| Georgetown | Caledonian Railway | 1959 | |
| Gerards Bridge | L&NWR | 1905 | |

=== Gi ===
| Station (Town, unless in station name) | Rail company | Year closed | Notes |
|---|---|---|---|
| Giffen | Lanarkshire and Ayrshire Railway | 1932 | |
| Gifford | North British Railway | 1933 | |
| Gilberts Crossing | Liverpool, Crosby and Southport Railway | 1851 | |
| Gilbey's Cottages Halt | British Railways | 1965 | |
| Gilderdale Halt | South Tynedale Railway | 1999 | |
| Gildersome East | L&NWR | 1921 | |
| Gildersome West | GNR | 1955 | |
| Gilesgate (Durham) | NER | 1857 | |
| Gileston | Barry Railway | 1964 | |
| Gilfach Goch | GWR | 1930 | |
| Gillett's Crossing Halt | Preston and Wyre Joint Railway | 1939 | |
| Gilling | NER | 1953 | |
| Gilmerton | North British Railway | 1933 | |
| Gilnockie | North British Railway | 1964 | |
| Gilsland | NER | 1967 | |
| Gilwern Halt | L&NWR | 1958 | |
| Girtford Halt | LM&SR | 1940 | |
| Girvan (Old) | Glasgow and South Western Railway | 1893 | |
| Gisburn | Lancashire and Yorkshire Railway | 1962 | |

=== Gl ===
| Station (Town, unless in station name) | Rail company | Year closed | Notes |
|---|---|---|---|
| Gladstone Dock | Lancashire and Yorkshire Railway | 1924 | |
| Gladstone Dock | Liverpool Overhead Railway | 1956 | |
| Glais (1st) | Midland Railway | 1875 | |
| Glais (2nd) | Midland Railway | 1950 | |
| Glamis | Newtyle, Eassie and Glamiss Railway | 1956 | |
| Glan Llyn Halt | GWR | 1965 | |
| Glanamman | GWR | 1958 | |
| Glandyfi | Cambrian Railways | 1965 | |
| Glanrhyd Halt | Vale of Towy Railway | 1955 | |
| Glanton | NER | 1930 | |
| Glan y Llyn | Cardiff Railway | 1931 | |
| Glanyrafon Halt (Shropshire) | Cambrian Railways | 1951 | |
| Glan-yr-Afon Halt (Powys) | GWR | 1962 | |
| Glapwell | Midland Railway | 1930 | |
| Glasbury-on-Wye | Midland Railway | 1962 | |
| Glascoed Halt | GWR | 1955 | |
| Glasgow Bridge Street | Glasgow and Paisley Joint Railway | 1905 | |
| Glasgow Buchanan Street | Caledonian Railway | 1966 | |
| Glasgow Cross | Caledonian Railway | 1964 | |
| Glasgow Dunlop Street | City of Glasgow Union Railway | 1876 | |
| Glasgow Green | Caledonian Railway | 1953 | |
| Glasgow Road (Perth) | Scottish North Eastern Railway | 1860 | |
| Glasgow St Enoch | City of Glasgow Union Railway | 1966 | |
| Glasgow South Side | Glasgow, Barrhead and Neilston Direct Railway | 1879 | |
| Glassaugh | Great North of Scotland Railway | 1953 | |
| Glassel | Great North of Scotland Railway | 1966 | |
| Glassford | Caledonian Railway | 1945 | |
| Glasson | North British Railway | 1932 | |
| Glasson Dock | L&NWR | 1930 | |
| Glasterlaw | Scottish North Eastern Railway/Caledonian Railway | 1951 | |
| Glastonbury and Street | Somerset and Dorset Joint Railway | 1966 | |
| Glazebury and Bury Lane | L&NWR | 1958 | |
| Glemsford | Great Eastern Railway | 1967 | |
| Glen Douglas Halt | North British Railway | 1964 | |
| Glen Falloch Halt | L&NER | 1948 | |
| Glenbarry | Great North of Scotland Railway | 1968 | |
| Glenboig | Caledonian Railway | 1956 | |
| Glenbuck | Glasgow and South Western Railway | 1952 | |
| Glenburnie | Edinburgh and Northern Railway | 1848 | |
| Glencarron Platform | Highland Railway | 1964 | |
| Glencarse | Caledonian Railway | 1956 | |
| Glencorse | North British Railway | 1933 | |
| Glendon and Rushton | Midland Railway | 1960 | |
| Glenellrig | Monklands Railway | 1850 | |
| Glenesk | North British Railway | 1874 | |
| Glenfarg | North British Railway | 1964 | |
| Glenfield (Leicestershire) (1st) | Midland Railway | 1876 | |
| Glenfield (Leicestershire) (2nd) | Midland Railway | 1928 | |
| Glenfoot | Stirling and Dunfermline Railway | 1851 | |
| Glengarnock High | Lanarkshire and Ayrshire Railway | 1930 | |
| Glenluce | Portpatrick and Wigtownshire Joint Railway | 1965 | |
| Glenoglehead | Caledonian Railway | 1889 | |
| Glenside | Glasgow and South Western Railway | 1933 | |
| Glenwhilly | Glasgow and South Western Railway | 1965 | |
| Globe Road and Devonshire Street | Great Eastern Railway | 1916 | |
| Glodwick Road (Oldham) | L&NWR | 1955 | |
| Glogue | GWR | 1962 | |
| Gloucester Eastgate | Midland Railway | 1975 | |
| Glyn Abbey | Burry Port and Gwendraeth Valley Railway | 1953 | |
| Glyn Ceiriog | Glyn Valley Tramway | 1933 | |
| Glyn Neath | GWR | 1964 | |
| Glyncorrwg | South Wales Mineral Railway | 1930 | |
| Glyndyfrdwy | GWR | 1964 | reopened 1993 |
| Glyne Gap Halt | London, Brighton and South Coast Railway | 1915 | |
| Glynllifon Street | Festiniog and Blaenau Railway | 1883 | |
| Glyntaff Halt | Alexandra (Newport and South Wales) Docks and Railway | 1930 | |

=== Gn - Go ===
| Station (Town, unless in station name) | Rail company | Year closed | Notes |
|---|---|---|---|
| Gnosall | LNWR | 1964 | |
| Goathland (first station) | Whitby and Pickering Railway | 1865 | |
| Gob-y-Deigan | Manx Northern Railway | 1887 | |
| Godalming (old) | LSWR | 1897 | |
| Godley East | Manchester, Sheffield and Lincolnshire Railway | 1995 | |
| Godley Toll Bar | Sheffield, Ashton-under-Lyne and Manchester Railway | 1842 | |
| Godmanchester | Great Northern and Great Eastern Joint Railway | 1959 | |
| Godnow Bridge | South Yorkshire Railway | 1917 | |
| Godreaman Halt (1st) | GWR | 1922 | |
| Godreaman Halt (2nd) | GWR | 1924 | |
| Godshill | Isle of Wight Central Railway | 1952 | |
| Godwin's Halt | Midland Railway | 1947 | |
| Gogar | North British Railway | 1930 | |
| Gogarth | Great Western Railway | 1985 | |
| Goitre Halt | Cambrian Railways | 1931 | |
| Golant Halt | GWR | 1965 | |
| Golborne North | Great Central Railway | 1952 | |
| Golborne South | North Union Railway | 1961 | |
| Golcar | LNWR | 1968 | |
| Golden Grove | LNWR | 1963 | |
| Golden Hill Platform | GWR | 1940 | |
| Golden Sands Halt | Romney, Hythe and Dymchurch Railway | 1990s | approximate date |
| Goldsborough | NER | 1958 | |
| Goldthorpe and Thurnscoe Halt | Dearne Valley Railway | 1951 | |
| Golf Club Halt (Hove) | Brighton and Dyke Railway | 1939 | |
| Golf Club Halt (Perthshire & Kinross) | Caledonian Railway | 1951 | |
| Golf Club Halt (Selsey) | West Sussex Railway | 1935 | |
| Golf Club House Halt | Great North of Scotland Railway | 1964 | |
| Golf Links (Camber) | Rye and Camber Tramway | 1939 | |
| Golfa | Cambrian Railways | 1931 | |
| Gollanfield Junction | Inverness and Nairn Railway | 1965 | |
| Gomersal | LNWR | 1953 | |
| Goodrington Sands | Great Western Railway | 1972 | transferred to the Dartmouth Steam Railway |
| Goole | Lancashire and Yorkshire Railway | 1879 | |
| Goonbell Halt | GWR | 1963 | |
| Goonhavern Halt | GWR | 1963 | |
| Goosehouse | Bolton, Blackburn, Clitheroe and West Yorkshire Railway | 1849 | |
| Gorbals | Glasgow, Barrhead and Kilmarnock Joint Railway | 1928 | |
| Gordon | North British Railway | 1948 | |
| Gorebridge | North British Railway | 1969 | reopened 2015 |
| Gorgie East | North British Railway | 1962 | |
| Gorleston Links Halt | Norfolk and Suffolk Joint Railway | 1970 | |
| Gorleston North | Norfolk and Suffolk Joint Railway | 1942 | |
| Gorleston-on-Sea | Norfolk and Suffolk Joint Railway | 1970 | |
| Gornal Halt | GWR | 1932 | |
| Gorseinon | LNWR | 1964 | |
| Gors-y-Garnant Halt | GWR | 1926 | |
| Gorton | North British Railway | 1964 | |
| Gosberton | Great Northern and Great Eastern Joint Railway | 1961 | |
| Gospel Oak | Tottenham & Hampstead Junction Railway | 1926 | reopened 1981 |
| Gosport | LSWR | 1953 | |
| Gosport Road and Alverstoke | LSWR | 1915 | |
| Goswick | NER | 1958 | |
| Gotherington Halt | GWR | 1955 | |
| Goudhurst | South Eastern Railway | 1961 | |
| Gourdon | North British Railway | 1951 | |
| Govan | Glasgow and Paisley Joint Railway | 1921 | |
| Govilon | LNWR | 1958 | |
| Gowerton South | LNWR | 1964 | |

=== Gr ===
| Station (Town, unless in station name) | Rail company | Year closed | Notes |
|---|---|---|---|
| Grace Dieu Halt | LNWR | 1931 | |
| Grafham | Midland Railway | 1959 | |
| Grafton and Burbage | Midland and South Western Junction Railway | 1961 | |
| Graig (Pontypridd) | Barry Railway | 1930 | |
| Grain | British Railways | 1961 | |
| Grain Crossing Halt | South Eastern and Chatham Railway | 1951 | |
| Grainsby Halt | GNR | 1939 | |
| Grampound Road | GWR | 1964 | |
| Granborough Road | Metropolitan Railway | 1936 | |
| Grandtully | Highland Railway | 1965 | |
| Grange | Great North of Scotland Railway | 1968 | |
| Grange Court | GWR | 1964 | |
| Grange Lane (Sheffield) | South Yorkshire Railway | 1953 | |
| Grange Road | London, Brighton and South Coast Railway | 1967 | |
| Grangemouth | Caledonian Railway | 1968 | |
| Grangetown (Teesside) | NER | 1991 | |
| Grantham Ambergate Yard | Ambergate, Nottingham, Boston and Eastern Junction Railway | 1852 | |
| Granton | North British Railway | 1925 | |
| Granton Road | Caledonian Railway | 1962 | |
| Grantown-on-Spey East | Great North of Scotland Railway | 1965 | |
| Grantown-on-Spey West | Highland Railway | 1965 | |
| Grantshouse | North British Railway | 1964 | |
| Granville Street (Birmingham) | Midland Railway | 1885 | |
| Grasscroft Halt | L&NWR | 1955 | |
| Grassington & Threshfield | Midland Railway | 1930 | |
| Grassmoor | Great Central Railway | 1940 | |
| Gravesend West | LC&DR | 1953 | |
| Grayrigg (1st) | L&NWR | 1861 | |
| Grayrigg (2nd) | L&NWR | 1954 | |
| Great Alne | GWR | 1939 | |
| Great Barr | L&NWR | 1899 | |
| Great Bridge North | L&NWR | 1964 | |
| Great Bridge South | GWR | 1964 | |
| Great Bridgeford | L&NWR | 1949 | |
| Great Broughton | Cleator and Workington Junction Railway | 1908 | |
| Great Coates Level Crossing | Grimsby and Immingham Tramway | 1961 | |
| Great Dalby | Great Northern and London and North Western Joint Railway | 1953 | |
| Great Glen | Midland Railway | 1951 | |
| Greatham | NER | 1991 | |
| Great Harwood | Lancashire and Yorkshire Railway | 1957 | |
| Great Haywood | North Staffordshire Railway | 1947 | |
| Great Horton | GNR | 1955 | |
| Great Houghton Halt | Dearne Valley Railway | 1951 | |
| Great Howard Street, Liverpool | Lancashire and Yorkshire Railway | 1851 | |
| Great Linford | L&NWR | 1964 | |
| Great Longstone | Midland Railway | 1962 | |
| Great Ormesby | Midland and Great Northern Joint Railway | 1959 | |
| Great Ponton | GNR | 1958 | |
| Great Shefford | GWR | 1960 | |
| Great Somerford | GWR | 1933 | |
| Greatstone | Romney, Hythe and Dymchurch Railway | 1983 | |
| Greatstone-on-Sea Halt | SR | 1967 | |
| Greaves (Lancaster) | Lancaster and Preston Junction Railway | 1849 | |
| Green Bank Halt | GWR | 1962 | |
| Greenesfield | York, Newcastle and Berwick Railway | 1850 | |
| Greenhead | NER | 1967 | |
| Greenhill Lower | Scottish Central Railway | 1966 | |
| Greenlaw | North British Railway | 1948 | |
| Greenloaning | Caledonian Railway | 1956 | |
| Greenmount | Lancashire and Yorkshire Railway | 1952 | |
| Greenock Lynedoch | Glasgow and South Western Railway | 1959 | |
| Greenock Princes Pier (1st) | Glasgow and South Western Railway | 1894 | |
| Greenock Princes Pier (2nd) | Glasgow and South Western Railway | 1965 | |
| Greenodd | Furness Railway | 1946 | |
| Greens of Drainie | Great North of Scotland Railway | 1859 | |
| Greens Siding | Great Western Railway | 1941 | |
| Greenway Halt | Great Western Railway | 1959 | |
| Greenwich Park | LC&DR | 1917 | |
| Greetland | Lancashire and Yorkshire Railway | 1962 | |
| Gregson Lane Halt | Lancashire and Yorkshire Railway | 1946 | |
| Gresford (for Llay) Halt | GWR | 1962 | |
| Gresley | Midland Railway | 1964 | |
| Gresty | L&NWR | 1918 | |
| Gretna | Caledonian Railway | 1951 | |
| Gretna | North British Railway | 1915 | |
| Gretton | Midland Railway | 1966 | |
| Gretton Halt | GWR | 1960 | |
| Griffith's Crossing | L&NWR | 1937 | |
| Grimesthorpe Bridge | Sheffield and Rotherham Railway | 1843 | |
| Grimethorpe Halt | Dearne Valley Railway | 1951 | |
| Grimoldby | GNR | 1960 | |
| Grimsargh | Preston and Longridge Railway | 1930 | |
| Grimsby Corporation Bridge | G&I/GCR | 1961 | |
| Grimsby Pier | Manchester, Sheffield and Lincolnshire Railway | 1879 | |
| Grimsby Pyewipe Road | Great Central Railway | 1912 | |
| Grimston | Midland Railway | 1957 | |
| Grimston Road | Midland and Great Northern Joint Railway | 1959 | |
| Grimstone and Frampton | GWR | 1966 | |
| Grindley | GNR | 1939 | |
| Grindley Brook Halt | LMSR | 1957 | |
| Grindon | North Staffordshire Railway | 1934 | |
| Grinkle | NER | 1939 | |
| Gristhorpe | NER | 1959 | |
| Groesffordd Halt | GWR | 1962 | |
| Groeslon | Nantlle Railway/L&NWR | 1964 | |
| Groeswen Halt | Alexandra (Newport and South Wales) Docks and Railway | 1956 | |
| Grogley Halt | L&SWR | 1967 | |
| Groombridge | London, Brighton and South Coast Railway | 1985 | Reopened by Spa Valley Rly |
| Grosvenor Road | London, Brighton and South Coast Railway | 1907 | |
| Grosvenor Road | London, Chatham and Dover Railway | 1911 | |
| Grotton and Springhead | L&NWR | 1955 | |
| Grove Ferry and Upstreet | South Eastern Railway (UK) | 1966 | |
| Grove Hill Halt | Wantage Tramway | 1925 | |
| Grovesend | L&NWR | 1932 | |

=== Gu ===
| Station (Town, unless in station name) | Rail company | Year closed | Notes |
|---|---|---|---|
| Guardbridge | North British Railway | 1965 | |
| Guay | Highland Railway | 1959 | |
| Guestwick | Midland and Great Northern Joint Railway | 1959 | |
| Guild Street (Aberdeen) | Caledonian Railway | 1867 | |
| Guisborough | NER | 1964 | |
| Gullane | North British Railway | 1932 | |
| Gunness and Burringham | Great Central Railway | 1916 | |
| Gupworthy | West Somerset Mineral Railway | 1898 | |
| Gushetfaulds | Caledonian Railway | 1907 | |
| Guthrie | Caledonian Railway | 1955 | |
| Guyhirne | Great Northern and Great Eastern Joint Railway | 1953 | |

=== Gw - Gy ===
| Station (Town, unless in station name) | Rail company | Year closed | Notes |
|---|---|---|---|
| Gwaun-Cae-Gurwen Halt | GWR | 1926 | |
| Gwernydomen Halt | Brecon and Merthyr Railway | 1956 | |
| Gwersyllt Hill Halt | GWR | 1931 | |
| Gwinear | West Cornwall Railway | 1852 | |
| Gwinear Road | GWR | 1964 | |
| Gwyddelwern | L&NWR | 1953 | |
| Gwys | Midland Railway | 1950 | |
| Gyfeillon Platform | Taff Vale Railway | 1918 | |
