= Grange railway station (disambiguation) =

Grange railway station may refer to:

Australia

- Grange railway station, Adelaide

England

- Grange-over-Sands railway station
- Grange Lane railway station (Sheffield)
- Grange Park railway station

Scotland

- Grange railway station (Scotland)
