= Cerist railway station =

Disused railway station in Llanidloes, Powys

Cerist
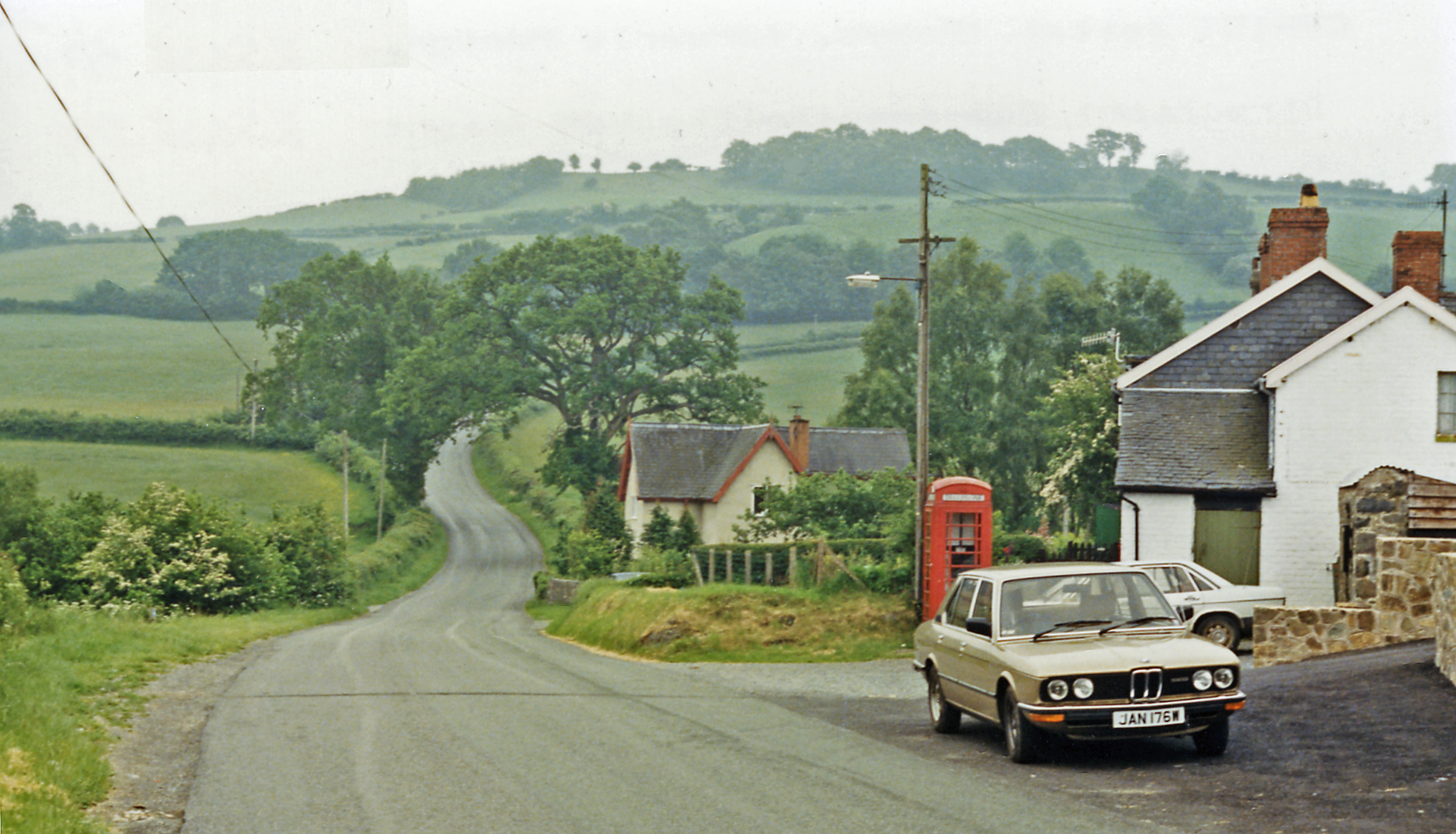
- The site of the station in 1986

General information
- Location: Llanidloes, Montgomeryshire; Wales
- Coordinates: 52.4818°N 3.5299°W
- Grid reference: SN962882

Other information
- Status: Disused

History
- Original company: Van Railway
- Pre-grouping: Van Railway

Key dates
- 1 December 1873: Opened
- July 1879: Closed to passengers
- 4 November 1940: Closed to goods
Location

Cerist railway station served the town of Llanidloes, in the historical county of Montgomeryshire, Wales, from 1873 to 1940 on the Van Railway.

== History ==
The station was opened on 1 December 1873 by the Van Railway. It was a request stop, where trains only stopped on Tuesday. The last trains were shown in the timetable in October 1875 but Trains were shown again in September 1876. Its name was shown as Cerist Siding in the handbook of stations. The station closed to passengers in July 1879 and closed to goods on 4 November 1940.

Preceding station	Disused railways	Following station
Trefeglwys; Line and station closed	Van Railway	Garth and Van Road; Line and station closed
