= Grange Lane railway station =

Grange Lane railway station may refer to:

In the United Kingdom

- Birkenhead Grange Lane railway station, in Birkenhead, Merseyside, England
- Grange Lane railway station (South Yorkshire), in Sheffield, England

Elsewhere

- Grange Lane railway station, Jamaica
