= Cwmllynfell railway station =

Disused railway station in Cwmllynfell, Neath Port Talbot

Cwmllynfell
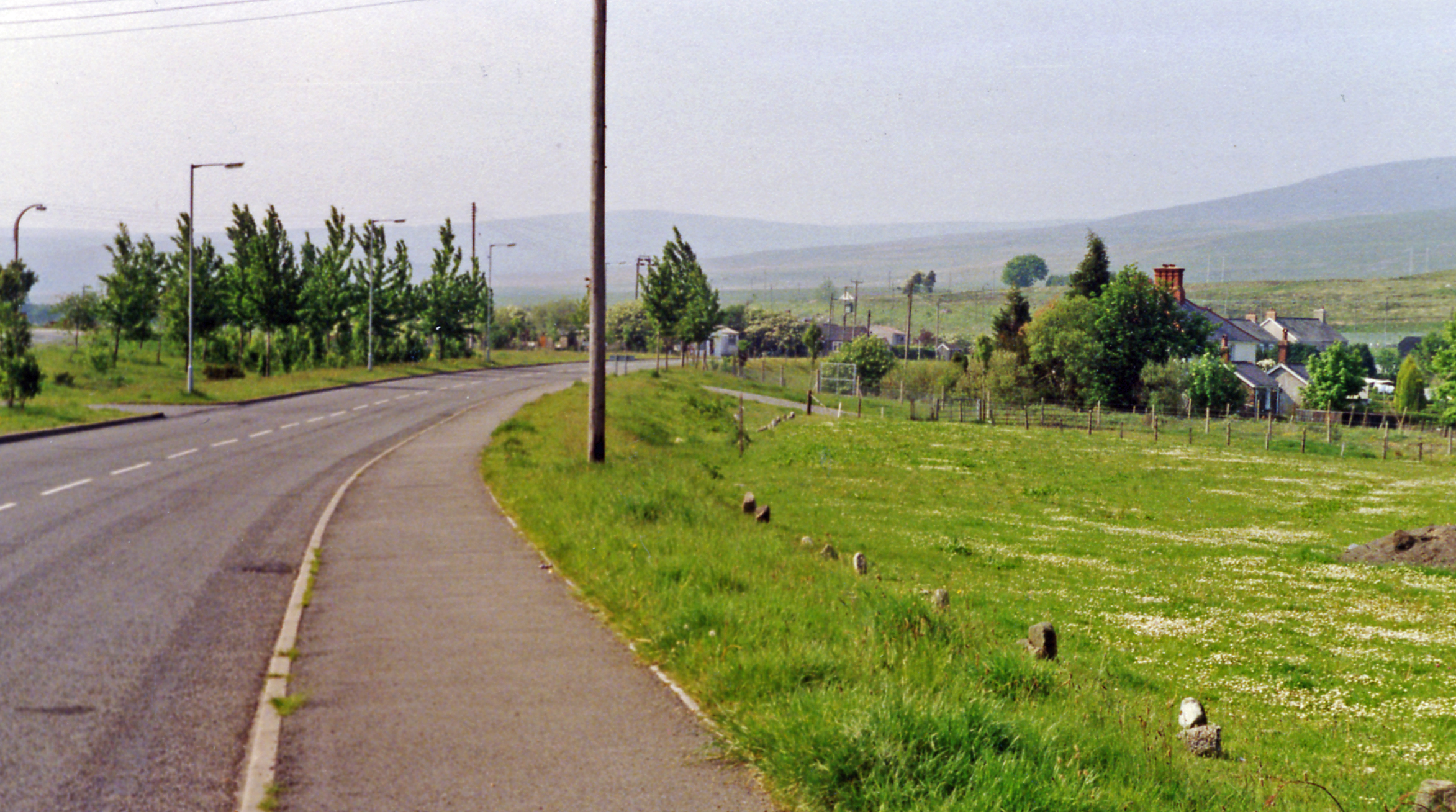
- The site of the station, looking north towards the Carmarthenshire Black Mountains, in 1990

General information
- Location: Cwmllynfell, Glamorganshire; Wales
- Coordinates: 51.8023°N 3.8259°W
- Grid reference: SN742131
- Platforms: 1

Other information
- Status: Disused

History
- Original company: Midland Railway
- Pre-grouping: Midland Railway
- Post-grouping: London, Midland and Scottish Railway

Key dates
- 7 December 1896: Opened as Gwaun-Cae-Gurwen Colliers Platform
- 1 July 1909: Name changed to Cwmllynfell
- 25 September 1950: Closed to passengers
- 28 September 1964: Closed to goods
Location

Cwmllynfell railway station served the village of Cwmllynfell, in the historical county of Glamorganshire, Wales, from 1896 to 1964 on the Swansea Vale Railway.

== History ==
The station was opened as Gwaun-Cae-Gurwen Colliers Platform on 7 December 1896 by the Swansea Vale Railway, although it didn't appear in the timetable. It appeared in the timetable on 1 July 1909 and its name was changed to Cwmllynfell. The station closed to passengers on 25 September 1950 and closed to goods on 28 September 1964.

| Preceding station | Disused railways | Following station |
|---|---|---|
| Gwys; Line and station closed | Swansea Vale Railway | Brynamman East; Line and station closed |
