= Roydon, King's Lynn and West Norfolk =

Coordinates: 52.77609°N 0.5261°E

Roydon
- Location within Norfolk
- Area: 4.62 km^{2} (1.78 sq mi)
- Population: 357
  - Density: 77/km^{2} (200/sq mi)
- OS grid reference: TF704228
- Civil parish: Roydon
- District: King's Lynn and West Norfolk
- Shire county: Norfolk
- Region: East
- Country: England
- Sovereign state: United Kingdom
- Post town: KING'S LYNN
- Postcode district: PE32
- Police: Norfolk
- Fire: Norfolk
- Ambulance: East of England

Roydon is a small village, civil parish and electoral ward east of King's Lynn in the English county of Norfolk. It covers an area of 4.62 km^{2} (1.78 sq mi) and had a population of 368 in 144 households at the 2001 census, the population of the village and ward being shown as 357 at the 2011 Census. For the purposes of local government, it falls within the district of King's Lynn and West Norfolk.

It is recorded in the Domesday Book as Reidnua and in 1254 as Ridone.

The village was served by the Grimston Road railway station of the Midland & Great Northern Railway Company (the station was named after the nearby village of Grimston despite being in the centre of Roydon because, at the time of opening, Grimston's population was ten times that of Roydon). The station opened in 1879, and closed to passengers in 1959 (freight traffic continued to pass through the village until this section of the M&GN railway finally closed in 1968).

Roydon today has a large common which is managed as a nature reserve.

The most significant building architecturally is the parish church of All Saints, parts of which date back to the 12th century although it was subject to major renovations by the prolific ecclesiastical architect GE Street in 1857. The church is Grade II* listed.
