= Gwys railway station =

Disused railway station in Upper Cwmtwrch, Powys

Gwys

General information
- Location: Upper Cwmtwrch, Brecknockshire; Wales
- Coordinates: 51.7869°N 3.8036°W
- Grid reference: SN756113

Other information
- Status: Disused

History
- Original company: Swansea Vale Railway
- Pre-grouping: Midland Railway
- Post-grouping: London, Midland and Scottish Railway

Key dates
- 2 March 1868: Opened
- 25 September 1950: Closed
Location

Gwys railway station served the village of Upper Cwmtwrch, in the historical county of Brecknockshire, Wales, from 1868 to 1950 on the Swansea Vale Railway.

== History ==
The station was opened on 2 March 1868 by the Swansea Vale Railway. It closed on 25 September 1950.

Preceding station	Disused railways	Following station
Ystalyfera; Line and station closed	Swansea Vale Railway	Brynamman East; Line and station closed
