= Brynamman West railway station =

Disused railway station in Brynamman, Carmarthenshire

Brynamman West
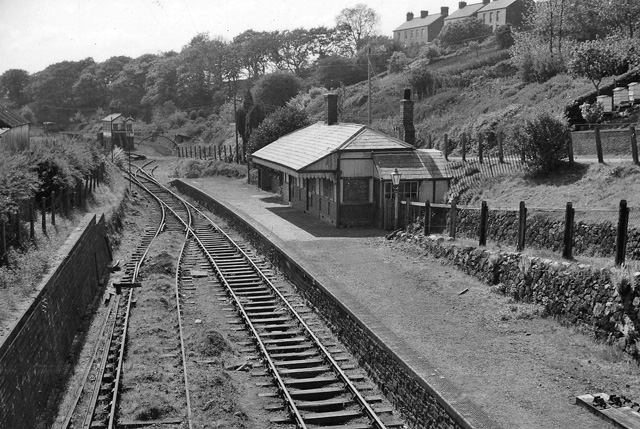
- The site of the station, looking west towards Pantyfynnon, in 1962

General information
- Location: Brynamman, Glamorganshire; Wales
- Coordinates: 51.8088°N 3.8711°W
- Grid reference: SN711139
- Platforms: 1

Other information
- Status: Disused

History
- Original company: Llanelly Railway
- Pre-grouping: Great Western Railway
- Post-grouping: Great Western Railway

Key dates
- 20 March 1865: Opened as Brynamman
- 1950: Name changed to Brynamman West
- 18 August 1958: Closed to passengers
- 28 September 1964: Closed to goods
Location

Brynamman West railway station served the village of Brynamman, in the historic county of Glamorganshire, Wales, from 1865 to 1964 on the Llanelly Railway.

== History ==
The station was opened as Brynamman on 20 March 1865 by the Llanelly Railway. To the north was a signal box. A new platform was built in 1868 but it was only used by the Llanelly Railway. Its name was changed to Brynamman West in 1950. The station closed to passengers on 18 August 1958 and closed to goods on 28 September 1964.

Preceding station	Disused railways	Following station
Garnant; Line and station closed	Llanelly Railway	Terminus
