= Denaby Halt railway station =

Disused railway station in South Yorkshire, England

Denaby Halt
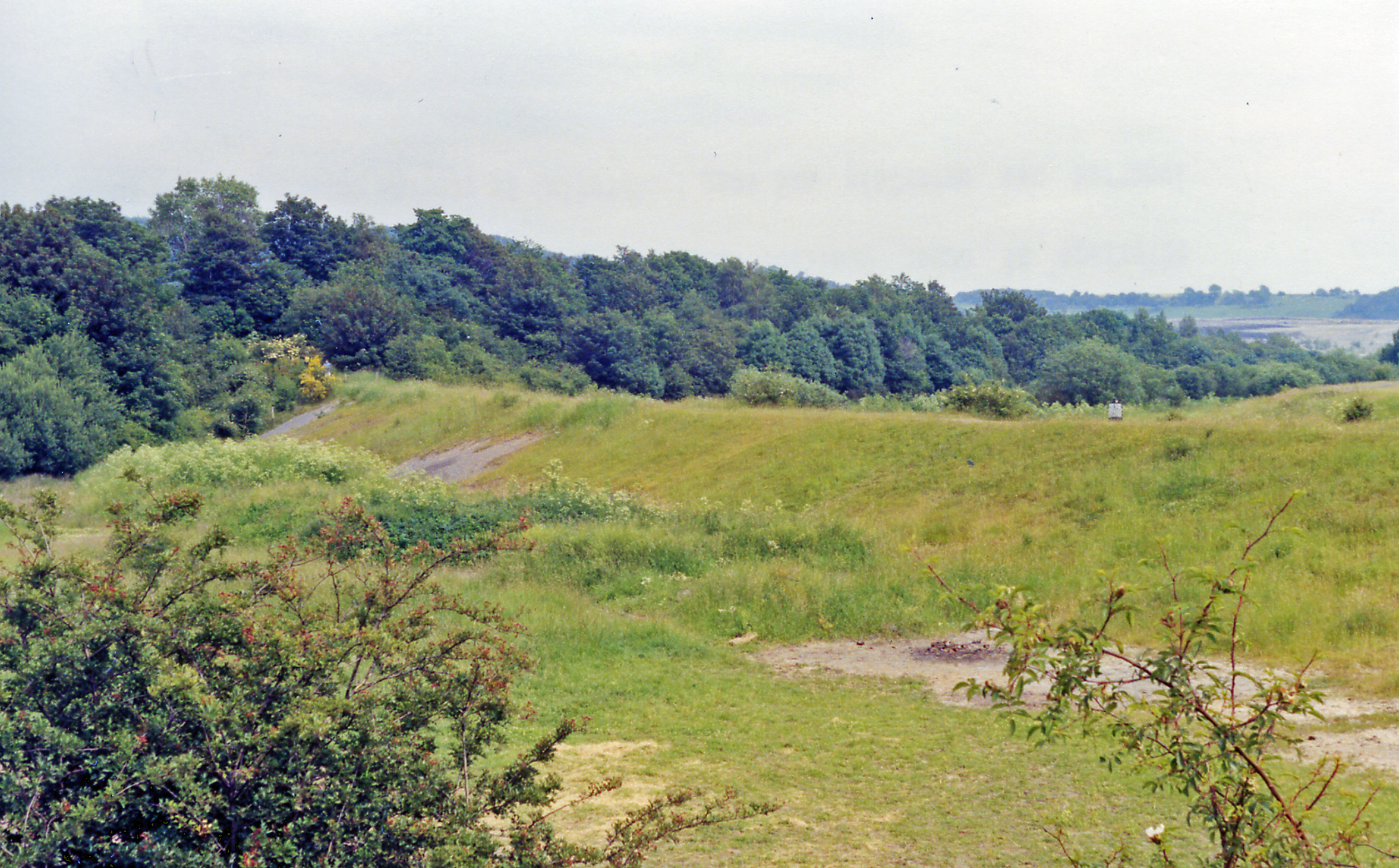
- Site of the halt in 1996

General information
- Location: Denaby Main, Doncaster; England
- Coordinates: 53.50204°N 1.24936°W
- Grid reference: SE498008

Other information
- Status: Disused

History
- Original company: Dearne Valley Railway
- Pre-grouping: London and North Western Railway
- Post-grouping: London, Midland and Scottish Railway

Key dates
- 3 June 1912: Station opened
- 1 January 1949: Station closed
Location

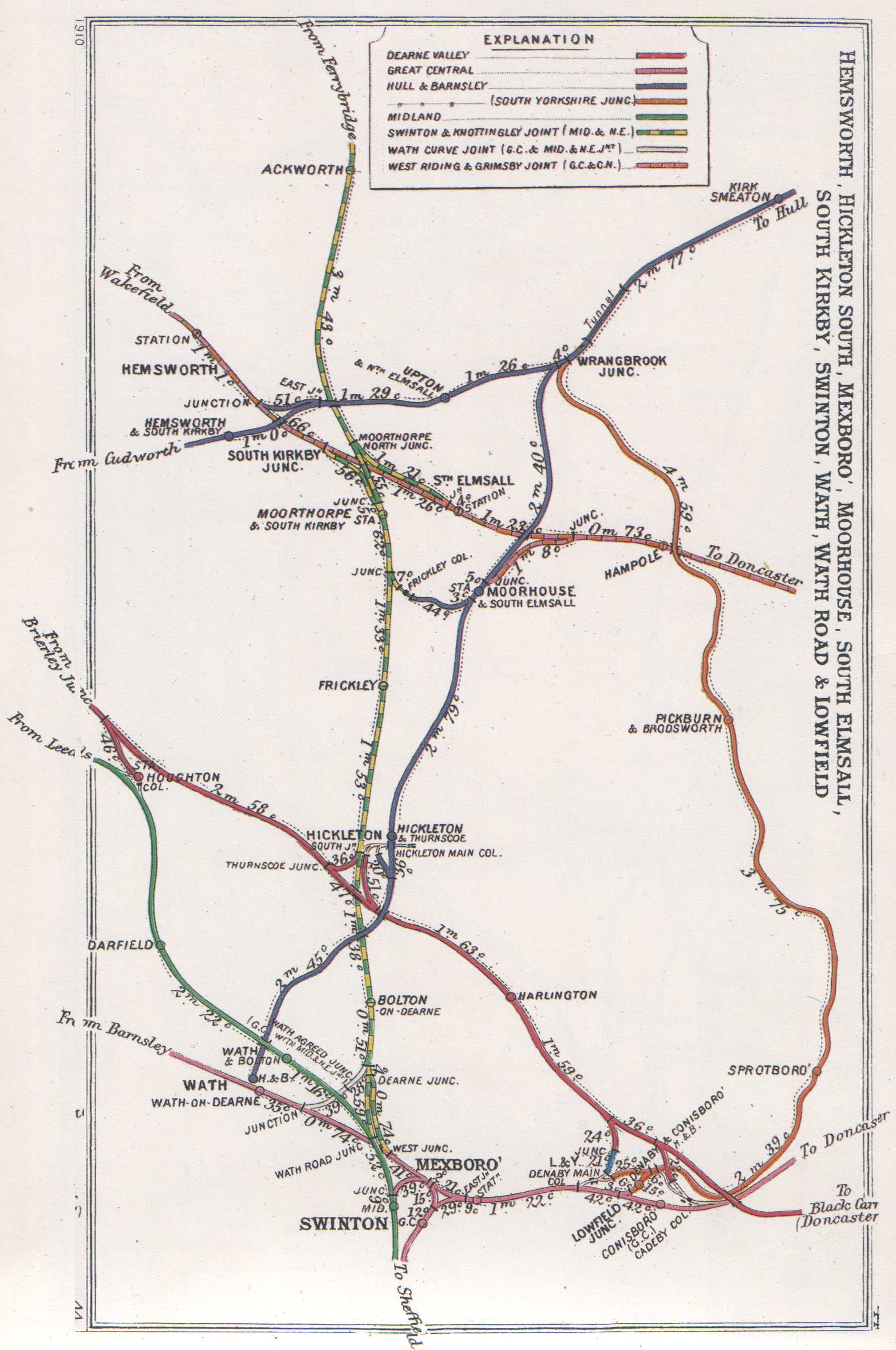
Railway Clearing House diagram including lines around Denaby in 1910.

Denaby Halt was a small railway station on the Dearne Valley Railway (DVR), intended to serve the mining community of Denaby Main in South Yorkshire, England, although it was some distance from there, in what was described as "a marshy wilderness". The station was opened on 3 June 1912. Its full title, as shown on its nameboard, was Denaby for Conisboro' and Mexboro. The halt was located between Edlington Halt, the eastern passenger terminus of the line and Harlington Halt.

The DVR was operated by the Lancashire & Yorkshire Railway and was built in order to tap the coal traffic available in the area, which could be shipped through their port at Goole.

The line offered a passenger service between Wakefield and Edlington, near Doncaster.

The halt was closed on 1 January 1949.

Preceding station	Disused railways	Following station
Harlington Halt; Line and station closed	Lancashire and Yorkshire Railway; Dearne Valley Railway	Edlington; Line and station closed
