= Llanmorlais railway station =

Disused railway station in Llanmorlais, Swansea

Llanmorlais

General information
- Location: Llanmorlais, West Glamorgan; Wales
- Coordinates: 51.631°N 4.12°W
- Grid reference: SS533945
- Platforms: 1

Other information
- Status: Disused

History
- Original company: London and North Western Railway
- Post-grouping: London, Midland and Scottish Railway

Key dates
- 1 March 1884: Opened
- 5 January 1931: Closed to passengers
- 1957: Closed to goods
Location

Llanmorlais railway station served the village of Llanmorlais, in the historical county of West Glamorgan, Wales, from 1884 to 1957 on the Llanmorlais Branch.

== History ==
The station was opened on 1 March 1884 by the London and North Western Railway. It closed to passengers on 5 January 1931 and closed to goods in 1957.

Preceding station	Disused railways	Following station
Terminus	London and North Western Railway; Llanmorlais Branch	Penclawdd; Line and station closed
