= Garth and Van Road railway station =

Disused railway station in Garth, Powys

Garth and Van Road

General information
- Location: Garth, Montgomeryshire; Wales
- Coordinates: 52.4748°N 3.547°W
- Grid reference: SN950874

Other information
- Status: Disused

History
- Original company: Van Railway
- Pre-grouping: Van Railway

Key dates
- 1 December 1873: Opened
- July 1879: Closed to passengers
- 1 November 1940: Closed to goods
Location

Garth and Van Road railway station served the village of Garth, in the historical county of Montgomeryshire, Wales, from 1873 to 1940 on the Van Railway.

== History ==
The station was opened on 1 December 1873 by the Van Railway. It closed to passengers in July 1879, although there were excursions in 1880 and the schoolchildren continued to be taken to school. It closed to goods on 1 November 1940.

Preceding station	Disused railways	Following station
Cerist; Line and station closed	Van Railway	Terminus
