= Ratby railway station =

Disused railway station in Ratby, Leicestershire

Ratby
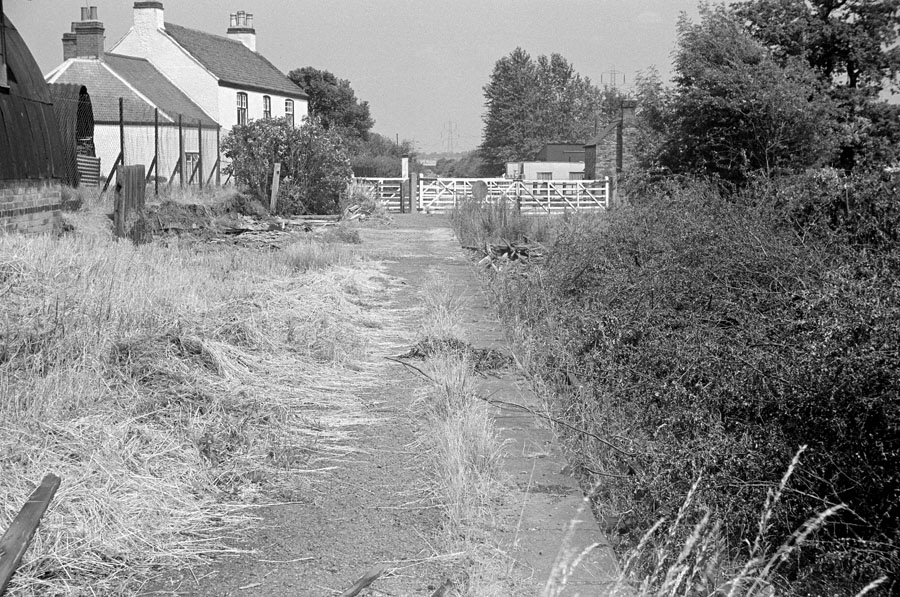
- The remains of the platform in 1967

General information
- Location: Ratby, Leicestershire; England
- Coordinates: 52.6439°N 1.2368°W
- Grid reference: SK517053
- Platforms: 1

Other information
- Status: Disused

History
- Original company: Leicester and Swannington Railway
- Pre-grouping: Midland Railway
- Post-grouping: London, Midland and Scottish Railway

Key dates
- 18 July 1832: Opened as Ratby Lane
- 26 April 1833: Name changed to Ratby
- 1873: Resited
- 24 September 1928: Closed
Location

Ratby railway station served the village of Ratby, Leicestershire, England, from 1832 to 1928 on the Leicester and Swannington Railway.

== History ==
The station was opened as Ratby Lane on 18 July 1832 by the Leicester and Swannington Railway. Its name was changed to Ratby on 26 April 1833. Services were reduced to Saturdays only on 24 December 1847 due to reconstruction of the line but they were restored on 27 March 1848. The station was resited to the west of the level crossing in 1873. It closed on 24 September 1928.

| Preceding station | Historical railways | Following station |
|---|---|---|
| Glenfield; Line and station closed | Leicester and Swannington Railway | Desford; Line and station closed |
