= Harlington Halt railway station =

Disused railway station in South Yorkshire, England

Harlington Halt

General information
- Location: Harlington, Doncaster; England
- Coordinates: 53.52003°N 1.27522°W
- Grid reference: SE481028

Other information
- Status: Disused

History
- Original company: Dearne Valley Railway
- Pre-grouping: London and North Western Railway
- Post-grouping: London, Midland and Scottish Railway

Key dates
- 3 June 1912: Station opened
- 10 September 1951: Station closed
Location

Harlington Halt was a small railway station on the Dearne Valley Railway (DVR) located close by Harlington village, near Mexborough, South Yorkshire, England.

The station, which was located between Denaby station and Goldthorpe and Thurnscoe Halt, opened on 3 June 1912. At first, trains were operated on behalf of the DVR by the Lancashire and Yorkshire Railway; when that company amalgamated with the London and North Western Railway on 1 January 1922, the combined organisation (also known as the London and North Western Railway) absorbed the DVR on the same day.

The station closed on 10 September 1951.

Preceding station	Disused railways	Following station
Goldthorpe and Thurnscoe Halt; Line and station closed	Lancashire and Yorkshire Railway; Dearne Valley Railway	Denaby Halt; Line and station closed
