= Ryhill Halt railway station =

Disused railway station in West Yorkshire, England

Ryhill Halt
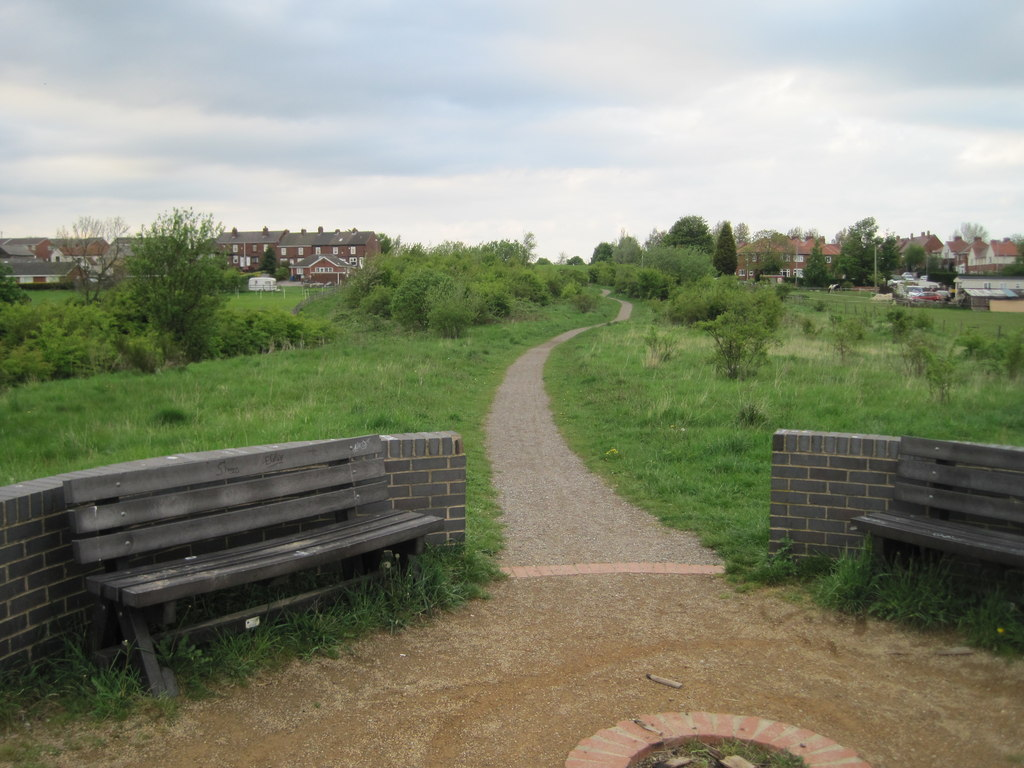
- Site of the former station in 2013

General information
- Location: Ryhill, City of Wakefield; England
- Coordinates: 53.617500°N 1.412300°W
- Grid reference: SE389135

Other information
- Status: Disused

History
- Original company: Lancashire and Yorkshire Railway
- Pre-grouping: LYR
- Post-grouping: London, Midland and Scottish Railway

Key dates
- 3 June 1912: Station opened
- 10 September 1951: Station closed
Location

Ryhill Halt railway station in Ryhill, West Yorkshire, England was a small railway halt on the Dearne Valley Junction Railway, a branch of the Lancashire and Yorkshire Railway which connected it to the Dearne Valley Railway. It was situated between Wakefield Kirkgate and Grimethorpe. It was opened for passenger traffic on 3 June 1912 and closed, along with others on the line on 10 September 1951.

Another station, Ryhill, served the village on the GCR's Barnsley Coal Railway from 1882 to 1930, about half a mile to the north-west.

Preceding station	Disused railways	Following station
Wakefield Kirkgate; Line closed, station open	Lancashire and Yorkshire Railway; Dearne Valley Railway	Grimethorpe Halt; Line and station closed
