= Penclawdd railway station =

Disused railway station in Wales

Penclawdd
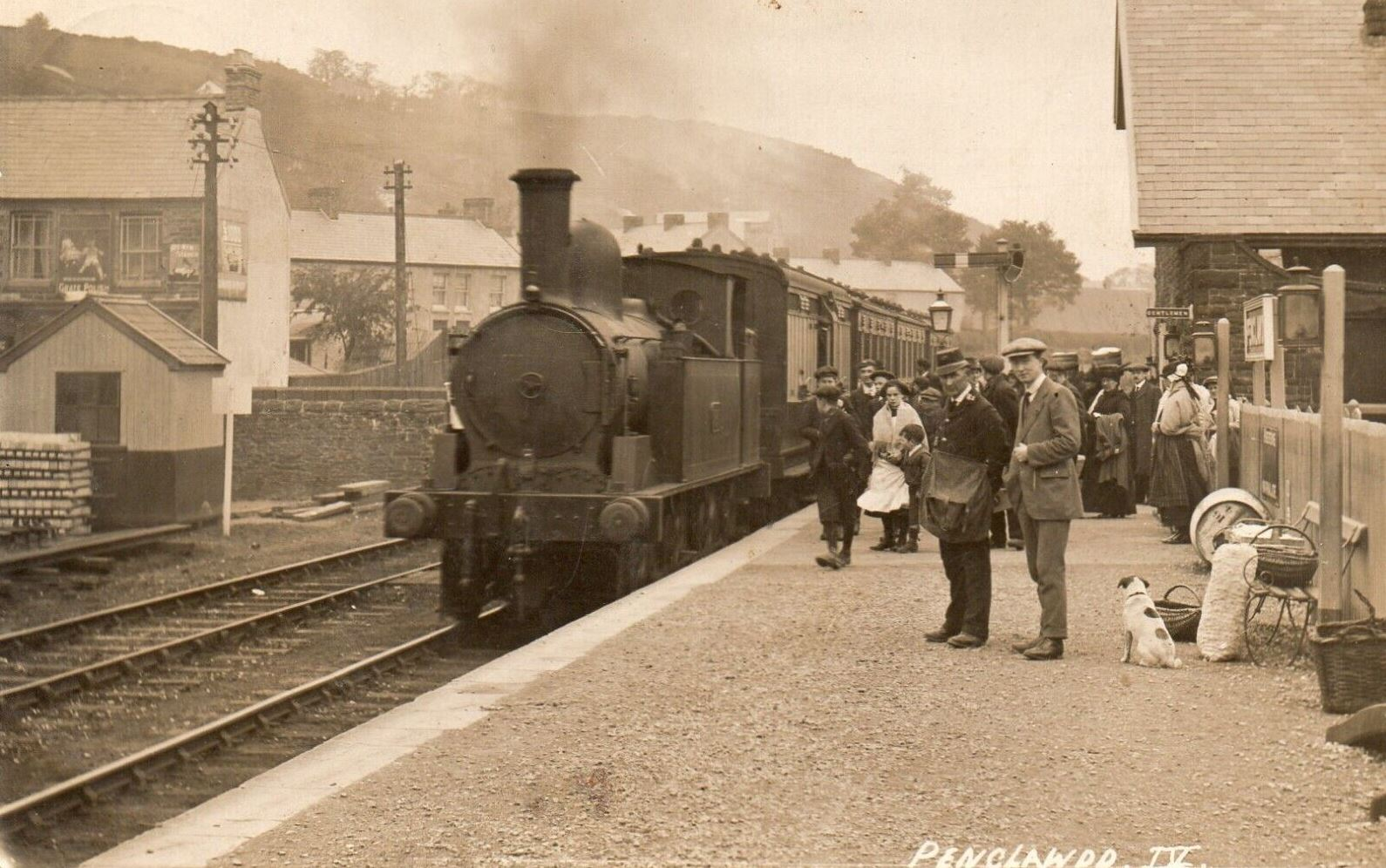

General information
- Location: Penclawdd, Glamorgan; Wales
- Coordinates: 51.6418°N 4.1029°W
- Grid reference: SS545957
- Platforms: 2

Other information
- Status: Disused

History
- Original company: London and North Western Railway
- Pre-grouping: London and North Western Railway
- Post-grouping: London, Midland and Scottish Railway

Key dates
- 14 December 1867: Opened
- 5 January 1931: Closed
Location

Penclawdd railway station served the village of Penclawdd, in the historic county of Glamorgan, Wales, from 1867 to 1931 on the Llanmorlais branch.

== History ==
The station was opened on 14 December 1867 by the London and North Western Railway, although orders were given to open the station on 10 December of the same year. Trains originally ran on Wednesdays and Saturdays. In April 1868, the service was cut back to Saturdays only but the full service resumed in August 1871. The station closed on 5 January 1931. After closure the station was demolished but a section of one platform has been preserved amongst the housing estate that occupies the station site.

Preceding station	Disused railways	Following station
Llanmorlais; Line and station closed	London and North Western Railway; Llanmorlais branch	Gowerton South; Line and station closed
