= Edlington railway station =

Disused railway station in South Yorkshire, England

Edlington
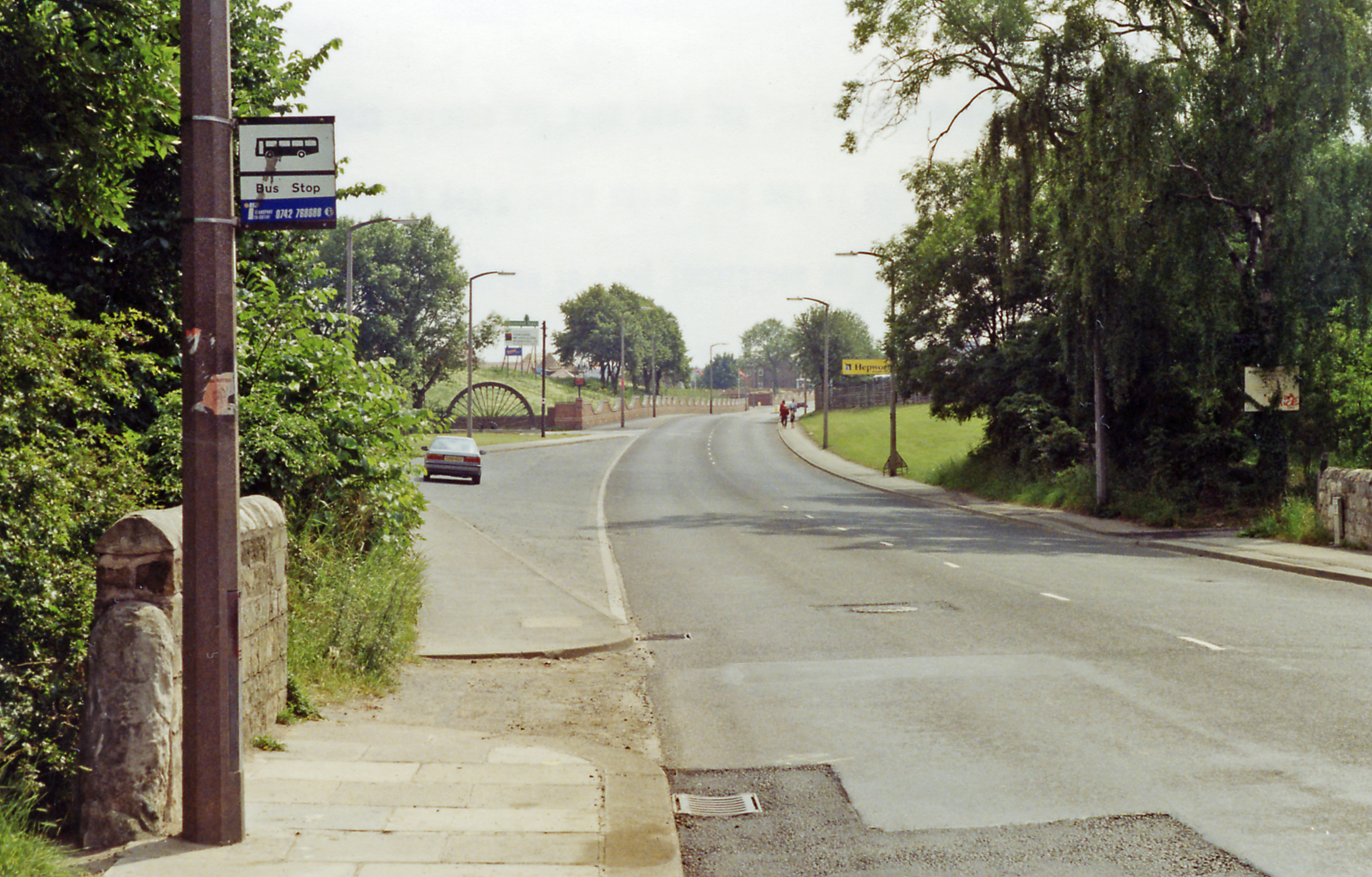
- Site of the station in 1992

General information
- Location: Edlington, Doncaster; England
- Coordinates: 53.4906°N 1.1815°W
- Grid reference: SK544996

Other information
- Status: Disused

History
- Original company: Dearne Valley Railway
- Pre-grouping: London and North Western Railway
- Post-grouping: London, Midland and Scottish Railway

Key dates
- 3 June 1912: Station opened
- 10 September 1951: Station closed
Location

Edlington railway station was a small railway station at the eastern terminus of the Dearne Valley Railway. The station's full title as shown on the station nameboard is "Edlington for Balby Doncaster" (with the words 'for' and 'Doncaster' in lettering half size compared to the others). It was built to serve the mining village of Edlington and the Doncaster suburb of Balby in South Yorkshire, England.

The station, like others on the Dearne Valley, consisted of a bed of sleepers set at track level with an old L&Y coach body lit by a couple of gas lamps for a waiting shelter. The large station sign was removed in the late 1920s and replaced by a simple "Edlington".

The station was opened for passengers on 3 June 1912 and ceased on 10 September 1951. The passenger service was originally operated by a Hughes-designed 'railmotor' which was fitted with vacuum-operated retractable steps, thus saving on platform building. At first, trains were operated on behalf of the DVR by the Lancashire and Yorkshire Railway; when that company amalgamated with the London and North Western Railway on 1 January 1922, the combined organisation (also known as the London and North Western Railway) absorbed the DVR on the same day.

== See also ==
- List of closed railway stations in Britain

Preceding station	Disused railways	Following station
Denaby Halt; Line and station closed	Lancashire and Yorkshire Railway; Dearne Valley Railway	Terminus
