= Glenfield railway station (Leicestershire) =

Disused railway station in Glenfield, Leicestershire

Glenfield
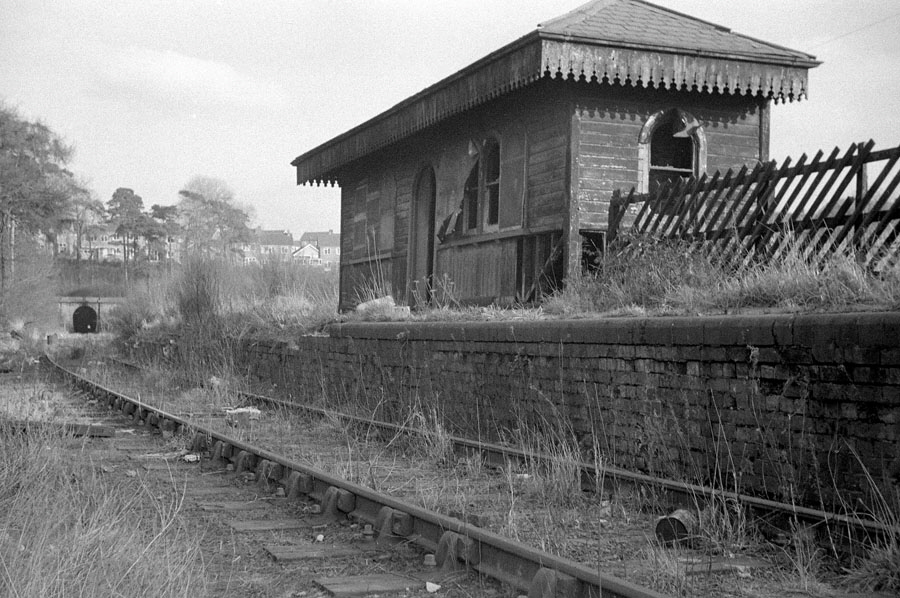
- The tunnel and site of the station in 1967

General information
- Location: Glenfield, Leicestershire; England
- Platforms: 1

Other information
- Status: Disused

History
- Original company: Leicester and Swannington Railway
- Pre-grouping: Midland Railway
- Post-grouping: London, Midland and Scottish Railway

Key dates
- 18 July 1832: Opened
- 1875: Resited
- 24 September 1928: Closed

Glenfield railway station served the village of Glenfield, Leicestershire, England, from 1832 to 1928 on the Leicester and Swannington Railway.

== History ==
=== First station ===
52.6535°N 1.2001°W
The first station was opened on 18 July 1832 by the Leicester and Swannington Railway. The services were cut back to only Saturdays from 24 December 1847, although they fully resumed on 27 March 1848. It was resited to the east of the level crossing in 1875.

=== Second station ===
52.6536°N 1.1989°W
The second station opened in 1875. It closed on 24 September 1928 but it was later used for a school excursion to Port Sunlight on 1 July 1938 and an excursion to Mablethorpe on 2 July 1938. The station building was used as a goods office until 1965.

Preceding station	Disused railways	Following station
Leicester West Bridge; Line and station closed	Leicester and Swannington Railway	Ratby; Line and station closed
