= Gilderdale Halt railway station =

Short-lived railway station in Alston, Cumbria

Gilderdale Halt
- Gilderdale Halt railway station in 1987

General information
- Location: Alston, Cumbria; England
- Coordinates: 54.8309°N 2.4618°W
- Grid reference: NY704485
- Platforms: 1

Other information
- Status: Disused

History
- Original company: South Tynedale Railway

Key dates
- December 1986: Opened
- 4 September 1999: Closed
Location

Gilderdale Halt railway station, also known as Gilderdale railway station, served the town of Alston, Cumbria, England, from 1986 to 1999 on the South Tynedale Railway.

== History ==
The station was opened in December 1986 on the South Tynedale Railway. It wasn't accessible by road; it was to the north of a farm accommodation. When the line was extended north to Kirkhaugh on 4 September 1999, the station closed. The platform still remains.

Preceding station	Historical railways	Following station
Kirkhaugh; Line and station preserved	South Tynedale Railway	Alston; Line and station preserved
