= Goldthorpe and Thurnscoe Halt railway station =

Disused railway station in South Yorkshire, England

Goldthorpe and Thurnscoe Halt

General information
- Location: Goldthorpe, Barnsley; England
- Coordinates: 53.53258°N 1.30579°W
- Grid reference: SE465035

Other information
- Status: Disused

History
- Original company: Dearne Valley Railway
- Pre-grouping: London and North Western Railway
- Post-grouping: London, Midland and Scottish Railway

Key dates
- 3 June 1912: Station opened
- 10 September 1951: Station closed
Location

Goldthorpe and Thurnscoe Halt was a small railway station on the Dearne Valley Railway (DVR) situated between Harlington Halt and Great Houghton Halt. It served the village of Goldthorpe in South Yorkshire, England.

The station opened on 3 June 1912. At first, trains were operated on behalf of the DVR by the Lancashire and Yorkshire Railway; when that company amalgamated with the London and North Western Railway on 1 January 1922, the combined organisation (also known as the London and North Western Railway) absorbed the DVR on the same day.

The station closed on 10 September 1951.

Preceding station	Disused railways	Following station
Great Houghton Halt; Line and station closed	Lancashire and Yorkshire Railway; Dearne Valley Railway	Harlington Halt; Line and station closed
