= Grimethorpe Halt railway station =

Disused railway station in West Yorkshire, England

Grimethorpe Halt

General information
- Location: Grimethorpe, Barnsley; England
- Coordinates: 53.58004°N 1.39757°W
- Grid reference: SE399094

Other information
- Status: Disused

History
- Original company: Dearne Valley Railway
- Pre-grouping: London and North Western Railway
- Post-grouping: London, Midland and Scottish Railway

Key dates
- 3 June 1912: Station opened
- 10 September 1951: Station closed
Location

Grimethorpe Halt was a small railway station on the Dearne Valley Railway (DVR) situated between Great Houghton Halt and Ryhill Halt. It served the village of Grimethorpe, South Yorkshire, England.

The station was opened on 3 June 1912, and closed on 10 September 1951. Originally, trains were operated on behalf of the DVR by the Lancashire and Yorkshire Railway; when that company amalgamated with the London and North Western Railway on 1 January 1922, the combined organisation (also known as the London and North Western Railway) absorbed the DVR on the same day.

Preceding station	Disused railways	Following station
Ryhill Halt; Line and station closed	Lancashire and Yorkshire Railway; Dearne Valley Railway	Great Houghton Halt; Line and station closed
