= Gorseinon railway station =

Disused railway station in Gorseinon, Swansea

Gorseinon
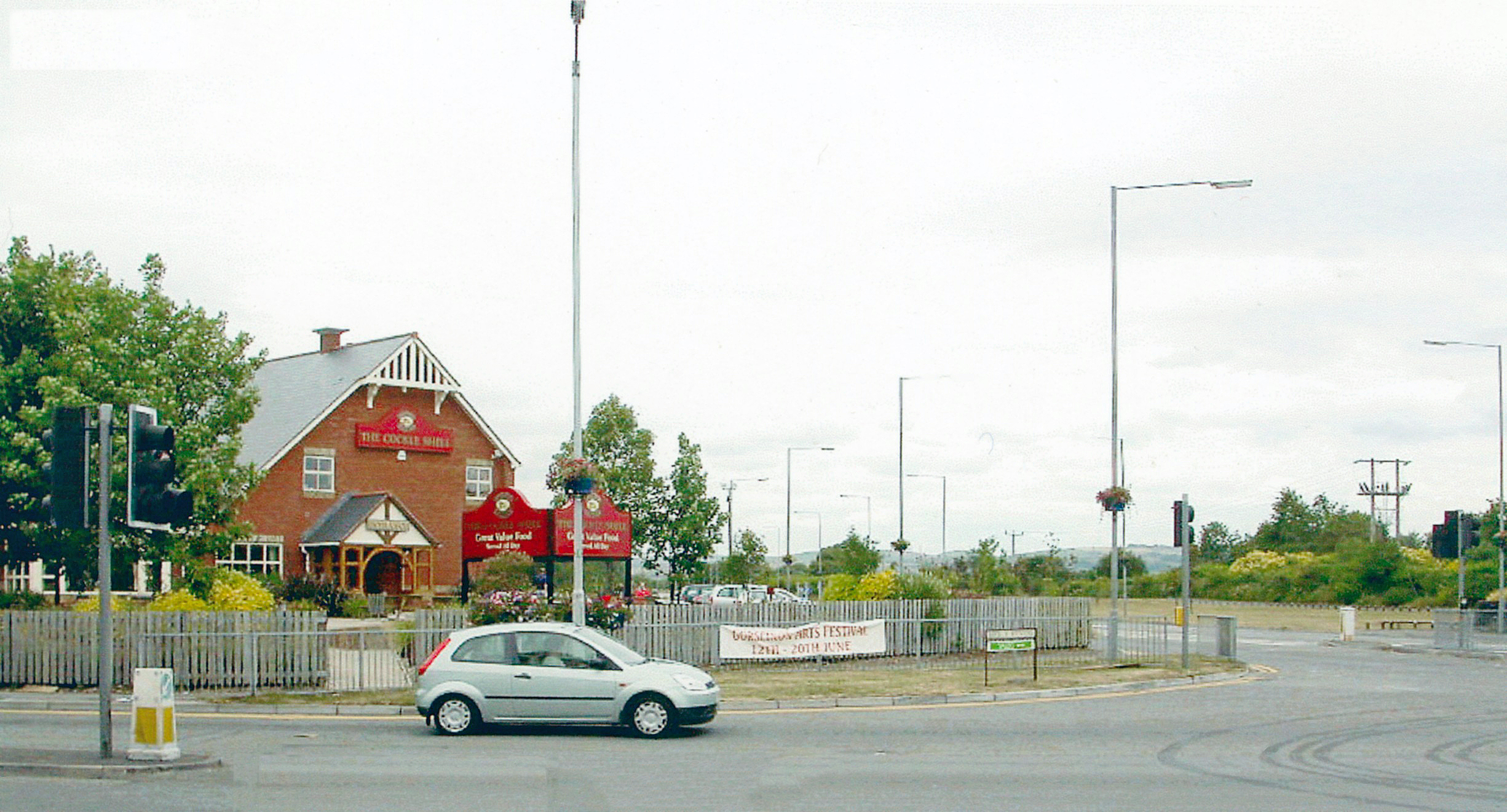
- The site of the station, looking northwest towards Pontardulais, in 2004

General information
- Location: Gorseinon, Glamorganshire; Wales
- Coordinates: 51.6676°N 4.0345°W
- Grid reference: SS594985
- Platforms: 2

Other information
- Status: Disused

History
- Original company: London and North Western Railway
- Pre-grouping: London and North Western Railway
- Post-grouping: London, Midland and Scottish Railway

Key dates
- 14 December 1867: Opened as Loughor Common
- 1 February 1868: Name changed to Gorseinon for Loughor
- 1874: Name changed to Gorseinon
- 15 June 1964: Closed
Location

Gorseinon railway station served the town of Gorseinon, in the historical county of Glamorganshire, Wales, from 1867 to 1964 on the Llanelly Railway.

== History ==
The station was opened as Loughor Common on 14 December 1867 by the London and North Western Railway. Its name was changed to Gorseinon for Loughor on 1 February 1868 and changed to Gorseinon in 1874. It was also known as Gorseinon Road in the local papers. The station closed on 15 June 1964.

| Preceding station | Disused railways | Following station |
|---|---|---|
| Grovesend; Line and station closed | London and North Western Railway; Llanelly Railway | Gowerton South; Line and station closed |
