= Brynamman East railway station =

Disused railway station in Brynamman, Carmarthenshire

Brynamman East
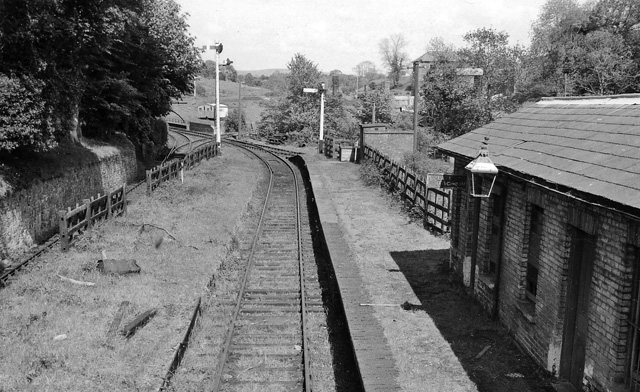
- The site of the station, looking east to Ystalyfera, in 1962

General information
- Location: Brynamman, Glamorganshire; Wales
- Coordinates: 51.8089°N 3.8682°W
- Grid reference: SN713139
- Platforms: 1

Other information
- Status: Disused

History
- Original company: Swansea Vale Railway
- Pre-grouping: Midland Railway
- Post-grouping: London, Midland and Scottish Railway

Key dates
- 2 March 1868: Opened as Brynamman
- 1950: Name changed to Brynamman East
- 25 September 1950: Closed to passengers
- 28 September 1964: Closed to goods
Location

Brynamman East railway station served the village of Brynamman, in the historical county of Glamorganshire, Wales, from 1868 to 1964 on the Swansea Vale Railway.

== History ==
The station was opened as Brynamman on 2 March 1868 by the Swansea Vale Railway. It was situated across the road from Brynamman West, which was on the Llanelly Railway. Its name was changed to Brynamman East in 1950. It closed to passengers on 25 September 1950 and closed to goods on 28 September 1964.

Preceding station	Disused railways	Following station
Cwmllynfell; Line and station closed	Swansea Vale Railway	Terminus
