= Gayton Road railway station =

Former railway station in Norfolk, England

Coordinates: 52.7507°N 0.4711°E

Gayton Road
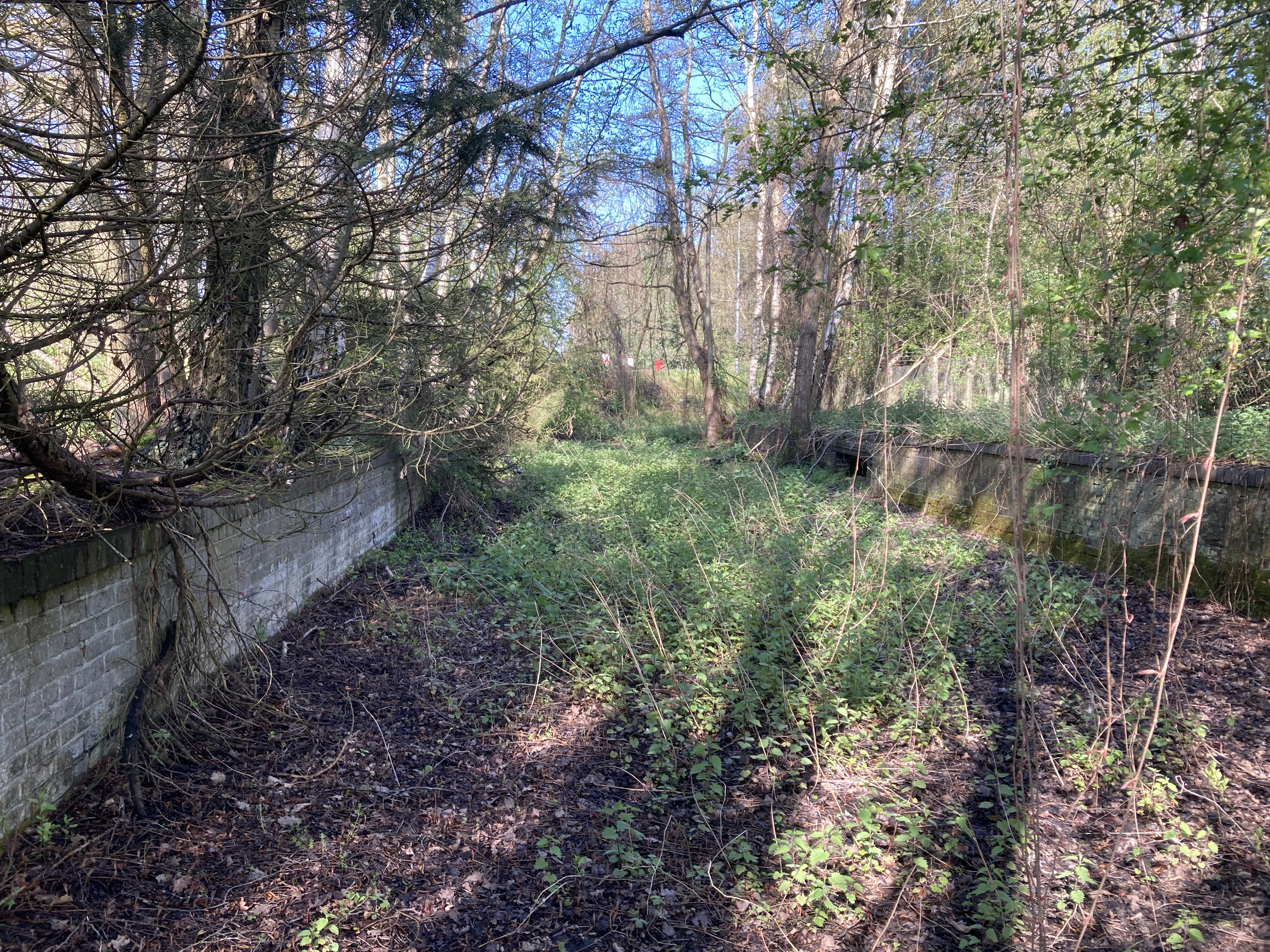
- The remains of the former Gayton Road railway station in Bawsey, Norfolk

General information
- Location: Bawsey, King's Lynn and West Norfolk, Norfolk; England
- Grid reference: TF668198
- Platforms: 2

Other information
- Status: Disused

History
- Pre-grouping: Eastern & Midlands Railway; Midland and Great Northern Joint Railway
- Post-grouping: Midland and Great Northern Joint Railway; Eastern Region of British Railways

Key dates
- 1 July 1887: Opened
- 2 March 1959: Closed to passengers
- 18 April 1966: Closed to freight
Location

Gayton Road railway station was a station in Norfolk, located close to King's Lynn on the Midland and Great Northern Joint Railway.

== History ==
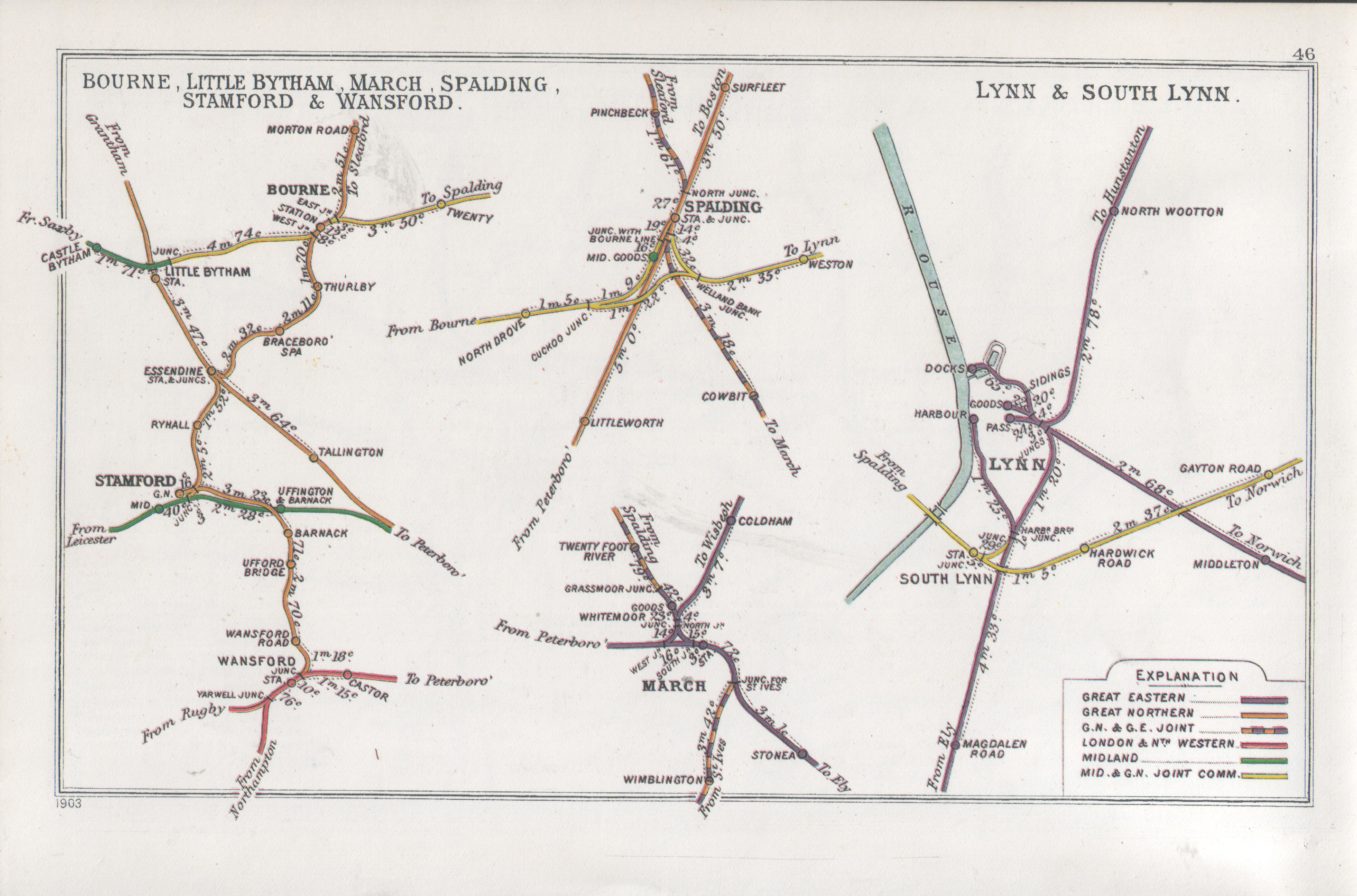
A 1903 Railway Clearing House map of railways in the vicinity of Gayton Road (right)

The station opened on 1 July 1887. It was closed on 2 March 1959.

The station platforms remain intact as of May 2021.

Former Services

Preceding station	Disused railways	Following station
South Lynn	Midland and Great Northern	Grimston Road

== See also ==
- Railways in Norfolk
