= Ystalyfera railway station =

Disused railway station in Ystalyfera, Neath Port Talbot

Ystalyfera

General information
- Location: Ystalyfera, Neath Port Talbot; Wales
- Coordinates: 51.7667°N 3.7821°W
- Grid reference: SN771090

Other information
- Status: Disused

History
- Original company: Swansea Vale Railway
- Pre-grouping: Midland Railway
- Post-grouping: London, Midland and Scottish Railway

Key dates
- 20 November 1861: Opened
- 25 September 1950: Closed
Location

Ystalyfera railway station served the village of Ystalyfera, in the historical county of Glamorganshire, Wales, from 1861 to 1950 on the Swansea Vale Railway.

== History ==
The station was opened on 20 November 1861 by the Swansea Vale Railway. It closed on 25 September 1950.

Preceding station	Disused railways	Following station
Ynysygeinon; Line and station closed	Swansea Vale Railway	Cwmtwrch Well Halt; Line and station closed
