= Grimston Road railway station =

Former railway station in Norfolk, England

Coordinates: 52.7794°N 0.5194°E

Grimston Road
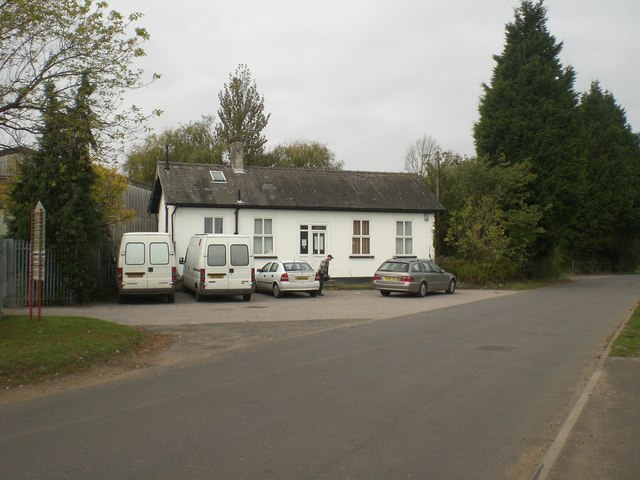
- Grimston Road railway station in 2007

General information
- Location: Roydon, King's Lynn and West Norfolk, Norfolk; England
- Grid reference: TF700231
- Platforms: 2

Other information
- Status: Disused

History
- Pre-grouping: Lynn and Fakenham Railway; Midland and Great Northern Joint Railway
- Post-grouping: Midland and Great Northern Joint Railway; Eastern Region of British Railways

Key dates
- 16 August 1879: Opened
- 2 March 1959: Closed to passengers
- 19 April 1965: Closed to freight
Location

Grimston Road railway station was a railway station in North Norfolk. It was on the Midland and Great Northern Joint Railway main line, carrying traffic between King's Lynn and the coast. It was not located in Grimston itself, but rather on the road leading into the village.

Former Services

Preceding station	Disused railways	Following station
Gayton Road	Midland and Great Northern	Hillington
