= Glamis railway station =

Disused railway station in Glamis, Angus

Coordinates: 56.6277°N 3.0178°W

Glamis
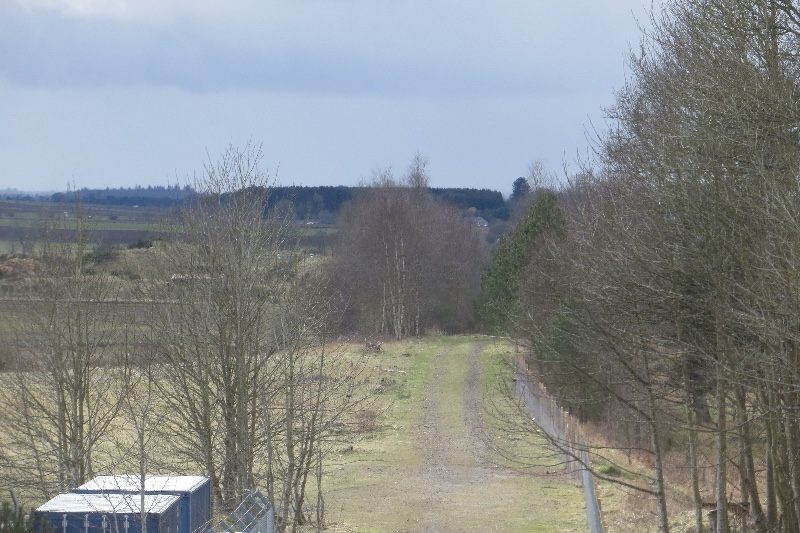
- The site of the station in 2015

General information
- Location: Glamis, Angus; Scotland
- Platforms: 2

Other information
- Status: Disused

History
- Original company: Newtyle, Eassie and Glamiss Railway
- Pre-grouping: Caledonian Railway
- Post-grouping: London, Midland and Scottish Railway; British Railways (Scottish Region)

Key dates
- 4 June 1838: Opened as Glammis
- 4 July 1846: Closed
- 2 August 1848: Reopened
- September 1861: Name changed to Glamis
- 11 June 1956: Closed permanently
Location

Glamis railway station served the village of Glamis, Angus, Scotland, from 1838 to 1956 on the Newtyle, Eassie and Glamiss Railway.

== History ==
The station opened on 4 June 1838 by the Newtyle, Eassie and Glamiss Railway. It closed on 4 July 1846 but reopened on 2 August 1848. To the south was a goods yard, which may have been built on the old station site. The signal box was at the west end of the eastbound platform. The station closed on 11 June 1956.

Preceding station	Disused railways	Following station
Eassie; Line and station closed	Caledonian Railway; Newtyle and Glammis Railway; Scottish Midland Junction Railway	Forfar; Line and station closed
