= Gowerton South railway station =

Disused railway station in Gowerton, West Glamorgan

Gowerton South
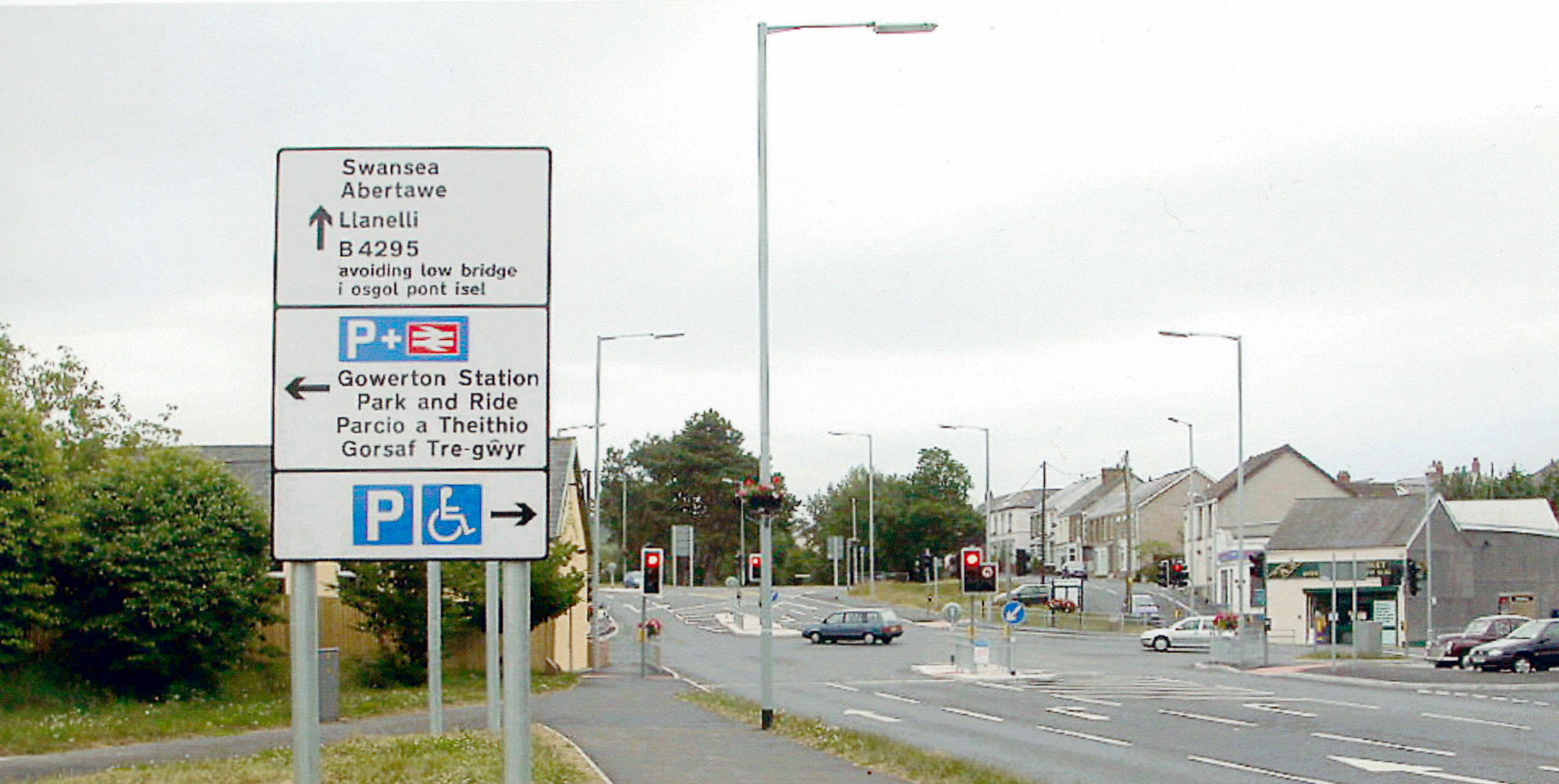
- The site of the station in 2004

General information
- Location: Gowerton, West Glamorgan; Wales
- Coordinates: 51.6472°N 4.0366°W
- Grid reference: SS591962
- Platforms: 2

Other information
- Status: Disused

History
- Original company: Llanelly Railway
- Pre-grouping: London and North Western Railway
- Post-grouping: London, Midland and Scottish Railway

Key dates
- 14 December 1867: Opened as Gower Road
- 1 July 1886: Name changed to Gowerton South
- 15 June 1964: Closed
Location

Gowerton South railway station served the village of Gowerton, West Glamorgan, Wales from 1867 to 1964 on the Llanelly Railway.

== History ==
The station opened as Gower Road on 14 December 1867 by the Llanelly Railway. The name was changed to Gowerton South on 1 July 1886 to avoid confusion with another station in Gowerton. The station closed to both passengers and goods traffic on 15 June 1964. After closure the station was demolished and the site is now occupied by a road removing all trace of the railway.

Preceding station	Disused railways	Following station
Penclawdd; Line and station closed	Llanmorlais branch line	Dunvant; Line and station closed
Gorseinon; Line and station closed	Llanelly Railway	Dunvant; Line and station closed
