= Dearne Valley Railway =

Disused railway in Yorkshire, England

The Dearne Valley Railway (DVR) was a railway line which ran through the valley of the River Dearne in South Yorkshire, England. It was incorporated by an Act of Parliament on 6 August 1897, which authorised the building of a line between Brierley Junction, on the main line of the Hull and Barnsley Railway, to junctions with the Great Northern Railway and the Great Northern and Great Eastern Joint Railway south-east of Doncaster.

Although the line was considered an independent company it was worked by the Lancashire and Yorkshire Railway (LYR). It opened in sections over seven years from 1902.

== History and description ==
Construction was complete by 1908-9 the work being carried out by contractors Naylor Bros., Gates and Hogg, Henry Lovatt, and Whittaker Bros. At first, only goods traffic was carried. Passenger trains came to the line on 3 June 1912 running between Wakefield Kirkgate and Edlington with intermediate halts serving Ryhill, Grimethorpe, Great Houghton, Goldthorpe and Thurnscoe, Harlington and Denaby.

The LYR amalgamated with the London and North Western Railway on 1 January 1922; the combined organisation (also known as the London and North Western Railway) absorbed the DVR on the same day. It duly passed to the London, Midland and Scottish Railway on 1 January 1923.

Passenger services ceased on 10 September 1951, the last trains having run on 9 September.

Goods traffic continued but several changes were made to the track layout. The lines between (near) Grimethorpe Colliery and Brierley Junction and from Grimethorpe Colliery and Edlington were closed on the opening of a new connection from the Midland Railway's main line near Houghton in 1966. The Dearne Valley connection to Yorkshire Main Colliery at Edlington was removed in May 1972, the colliery being served by a connection to St. Catherine's Junction on the South Yorkshire Joint Railway, the junctions here being rebuilt in connection with the Doncaster area re-signalling in early May 1977.

== Route diagrams ==
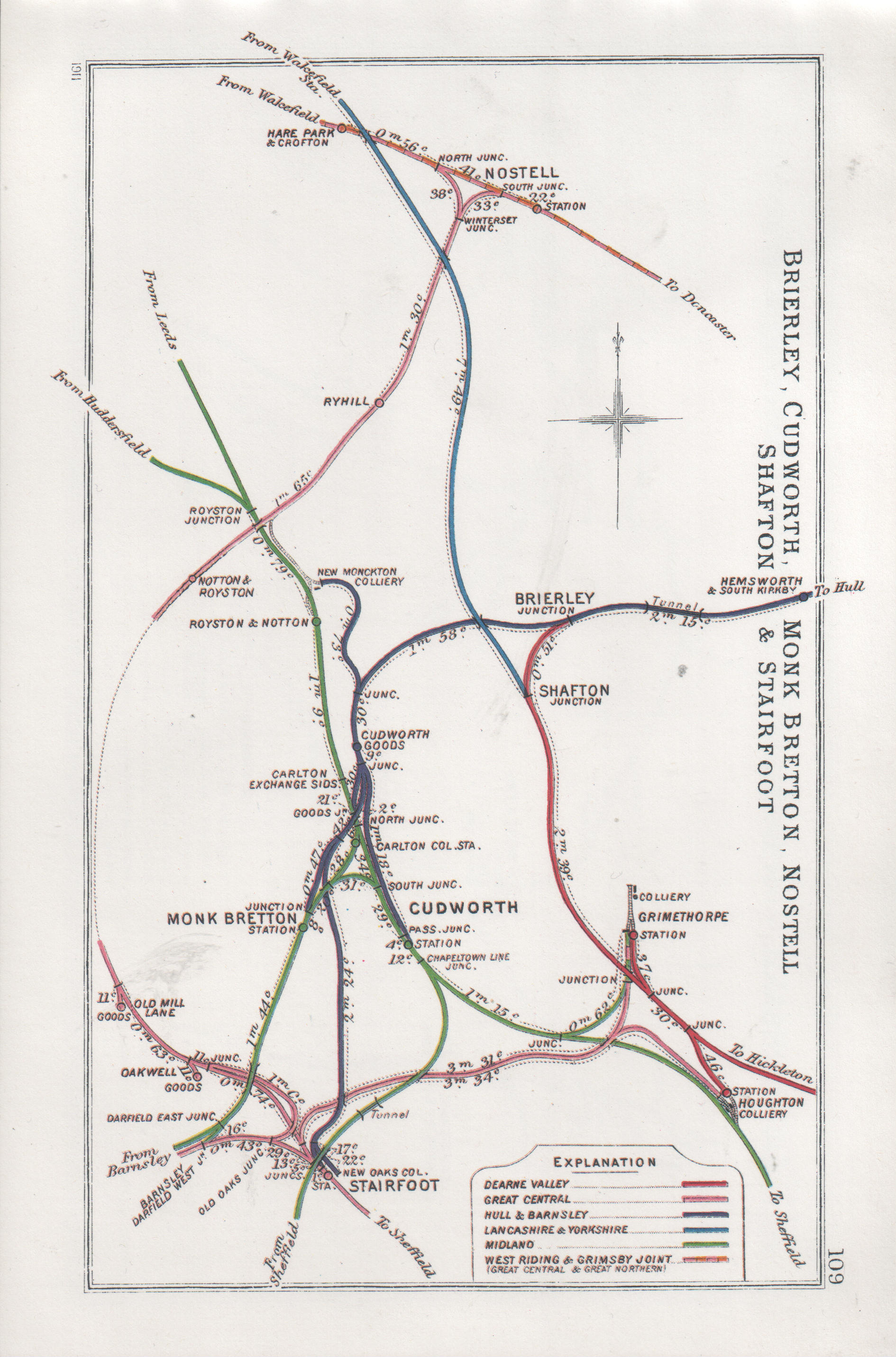
The western end in 1911

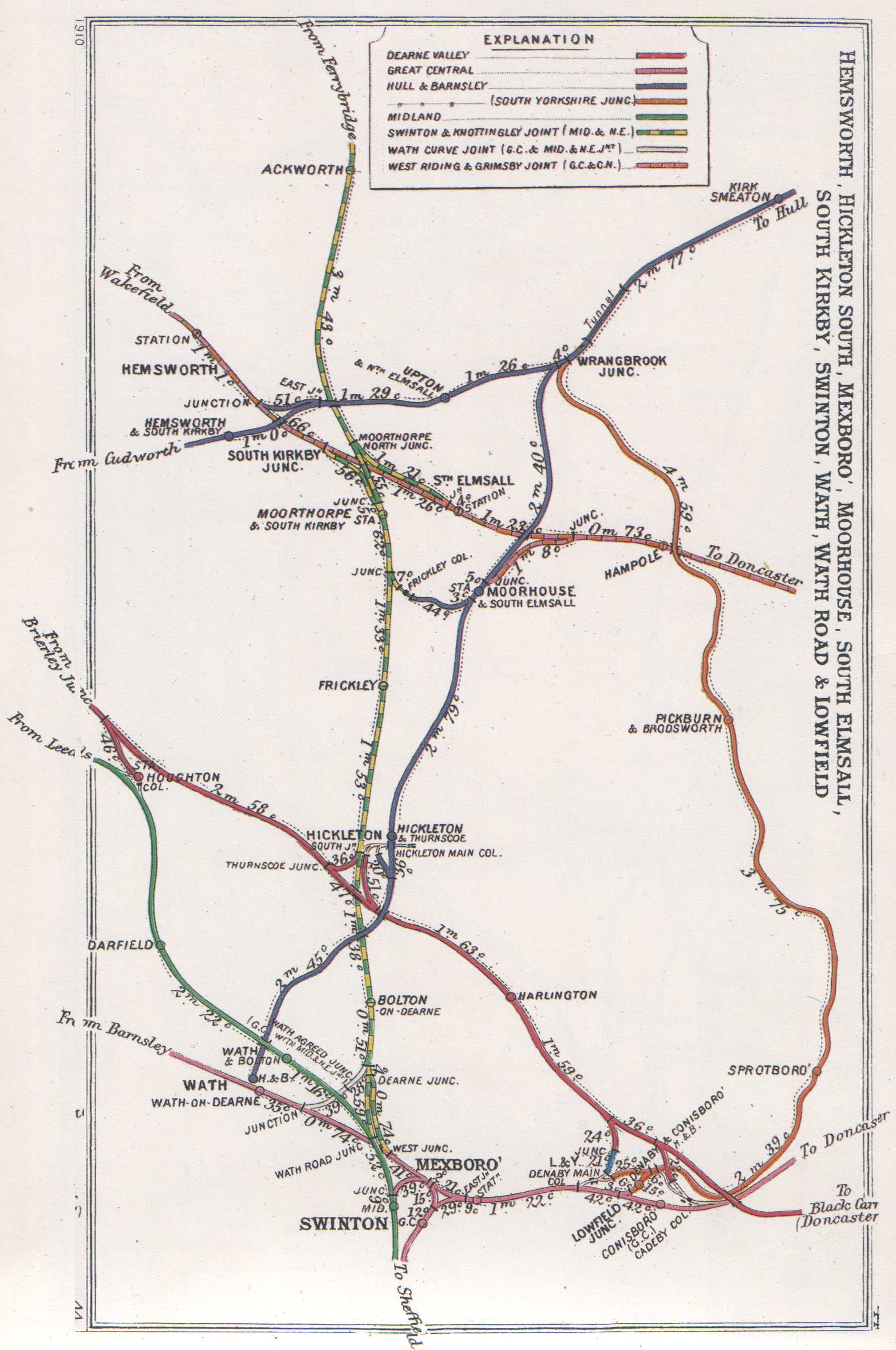
The central section in 1910

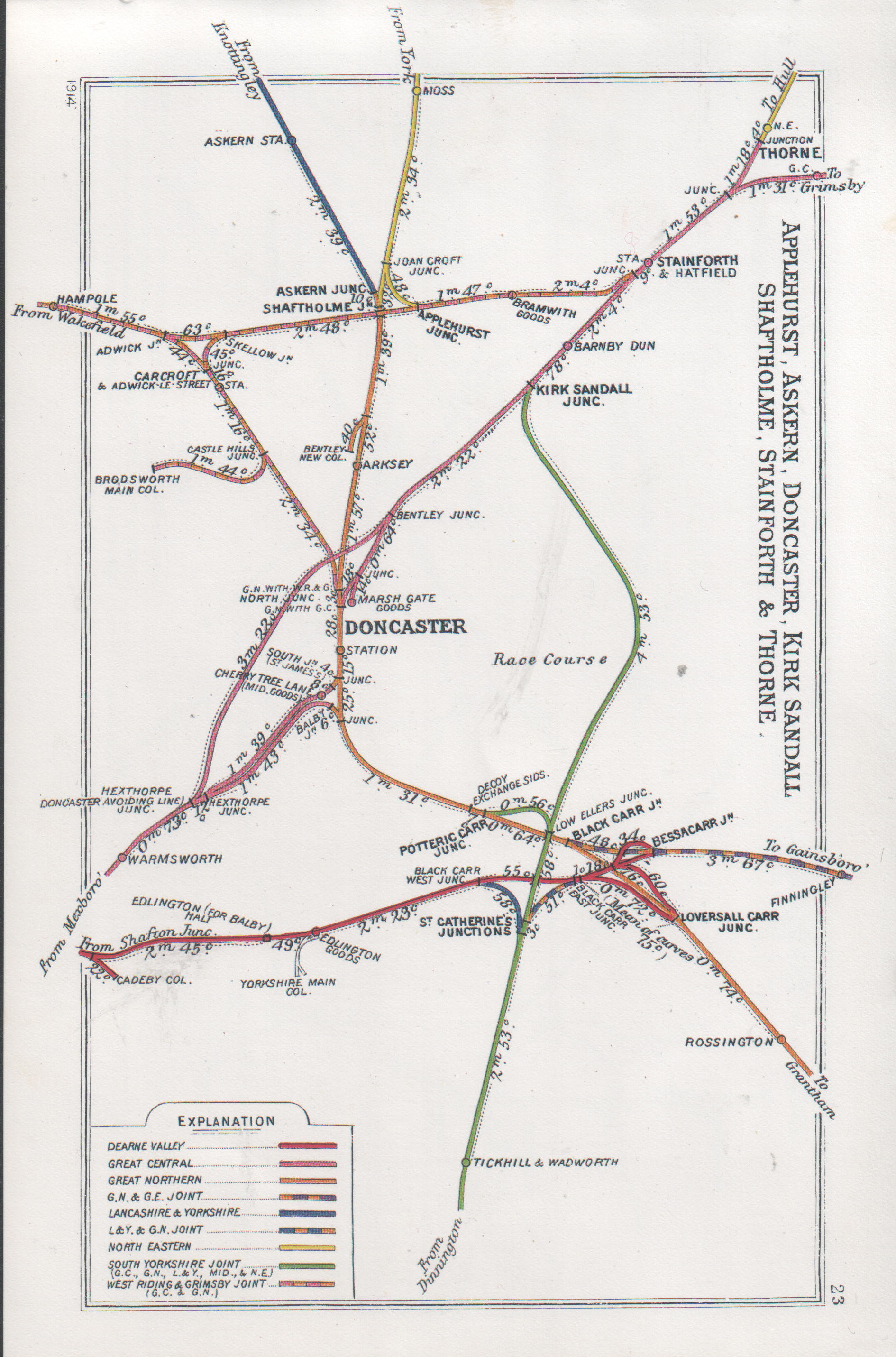
The eastern end in 1914

Railway Clearing House diagrams showing the L&Y connection from Wakefield Kirkgate (blue) and the line of the Dearne Valley Railway from Brierley to Black Carr junction (red)
