= Grovesend railway station =

Disused railway station in Grovesend, Swansea

Grovesend

General information
- Location: Grovesend, Glamorganshire; Wales
- Coordinates: 51.690155°N 4.029854°W
- Platforms: 2

Other information
- Status: Disused

History
- Original company: London and North Western Railway
- Pre-grouping: London and North Western Railway
- Post-grouping: London, Midland and Scottish Railway

Key dates
- 1 January 1910: Opened
- 6 June 1932: Closed
Location

Grovesend railway station served the village of Grovesend, in the historical county of Glamorganshire, Wales, from 1910 to 1932 on the Llanelly Railway.

== History ==
The station was opened on 1 January 1910 by the London and North Western Railway and closed on 6 June 1932.

Preceding station	Disused railways	Following station
Pontarddulais; Line and station closed	London and North Western Railway; Llanelly Railway	Gorseinon; Line and station closed
