= Great Houghton Halt railway station =

Disused railway station in South Yorkshire, England

Great Houghton Halt

General information
- Location: Great Houghton, Barnsley; England
- Coordinates: 53.5487°N 1.3454°W
- Grid reference: SE434059

Other information
- Status: Disused

History
- Original company: Dearne Valley Railway
- Pre-grouping: London and North Western Railway
- Post-grouping: London, Midland and Scottish Railway

Key dates
- 3 June 1912: Opened as Houghton Halt
- 24 August 1912: Renamed Great Houghton Halt
- 10 September 1951: Station closed
Location

Great Houghton Halt was a small railway station on the Dearne Valley Railway (DVR) situated between Goldthorpe and Thurnscoe Halt and Grimethorpe Halt. The halt served the village of Great Houghton in South Yorkshire, England.

The station opened on 3 June 1912. Originally named Houghton Halt, it was renamed Great Houghton Halt a few weeks later, on 24 August 1912. At first, trains were operated on behalf of the DVR by the Lancashire and Yorkshire Railway; when that company amalgamated with the London and North Western Railway on 1 January 1922, the combined organisation (also known as the London and North Western Railway) absorbed the DVR on the same day.

The station closed on 10 September 1951.

Preceding station	Disused railways	Following station
Grimethorpe Halt; Line and station closed	Lancashire and Yorkshire Railway; Dearne Valley Railway	Goldthorpe and Thurnscoe Halt; Line and station closed
