= Grayrigg railway station =

Disused railway station in Cumbria, England

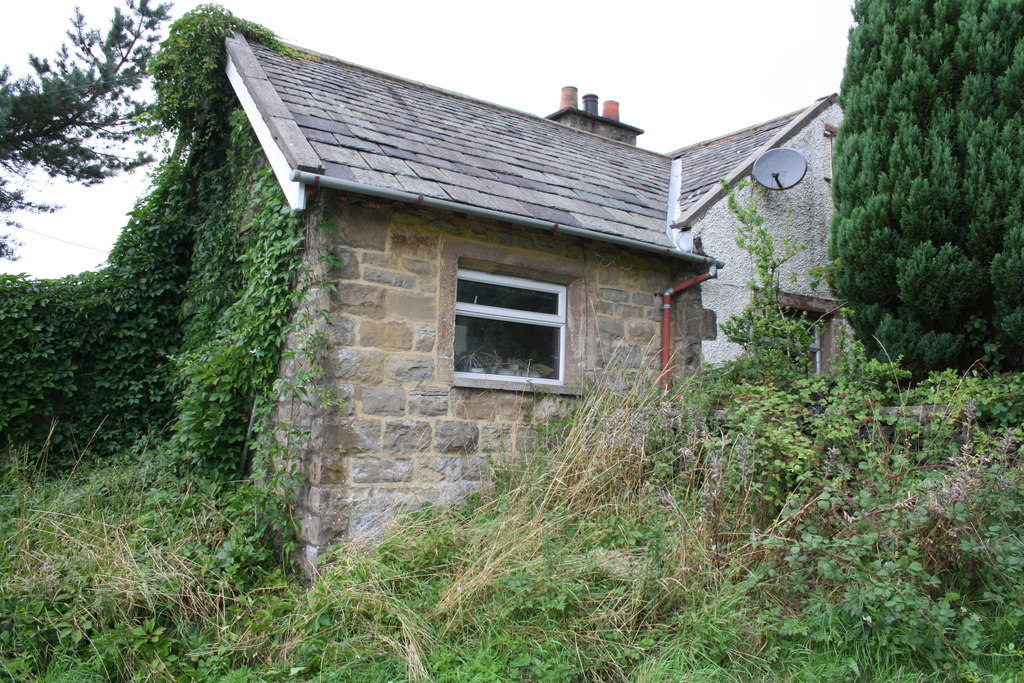
- The station house in 2013

General information
- Location: Grayrigg, Westmorland and Furness; England
- Coordinates: 54.3585°N 2.6191°W
- Grid reference: SD598960
- Platforms: 2

Other information
- Status: Disused

History
- Pre-grouping: London and North Western Railway
- Post-grouping: London, Midland and Scottish Railway

Key dates
- 8 July 1848: first station opened
- November 1849: resited
- 1 February 1954: Closed to passengers
Location

Grayrigg railway station in Lambrigg parish, was situated on the Lancaster and Carlisle Railway (L&CR) (the West Coast Main Line) between Lancaster and Penrith. It served the village and rural district of Grayrigg, Cumbria, England. The original L&CR station that was located two miles (3.2 km) west of the station closed in 1849. The new station opened in November 1849, and closed on 1 February 1954.

== The station ==
The station had two platforms, a signal box to the north and a station master's house. The goods yard had a weighing machine and a coal yard. The much modified station house survives, the platforms have however been demolished and the line has been electrified. An electricity supply sub-station is located here and the railway becomes triple track here for a distance running north.

The old Ingleton Branch Line's Low Gill Viaduct lay nearby. This line was completed in 1861 and served the towns of Ingleton, Kirkby Lonsdale and Sedbergh. It closed to passengers in 1954 and was dismantled in 1967.

== The Grayrigg derailment ==
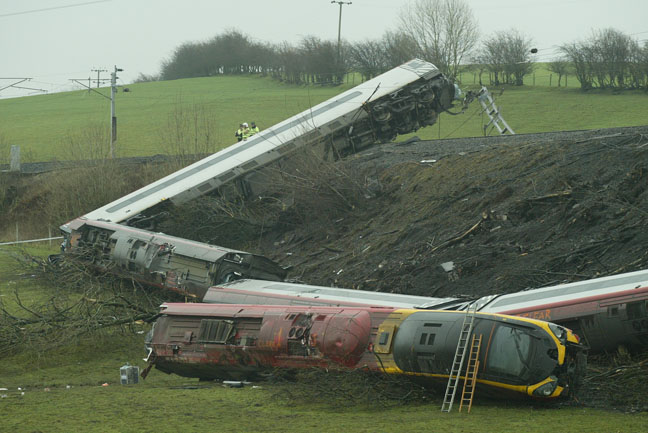
The scene at the Grayrigg derailment.

A fatal railway accident occurred on 23 February 2007, just to the south of Grayrigg that killed one passenger and 28 seriously injured. The derailment to a London (Euston) to Glasgow Virgin Pendolino express was caused by a faulty set of points controlled from the nearby Lambrigg ground frame. The points which caused the derailment, and points on the opposite line, were removed from the track following the derailment. The track is now welded continuously for 2.2 miles here, including the section over the Docker Viaduct. The overhead electrical line equipment had to be replaced, double-line catenary from a single stand being used.

== Stations on the line ==
The next station on the line towards Carlisle was Low Gill and the preceding station was Oxenholme.
