= Garnant railway station =

Disused railway station in Garnant, Carmarthenshire

Garnant
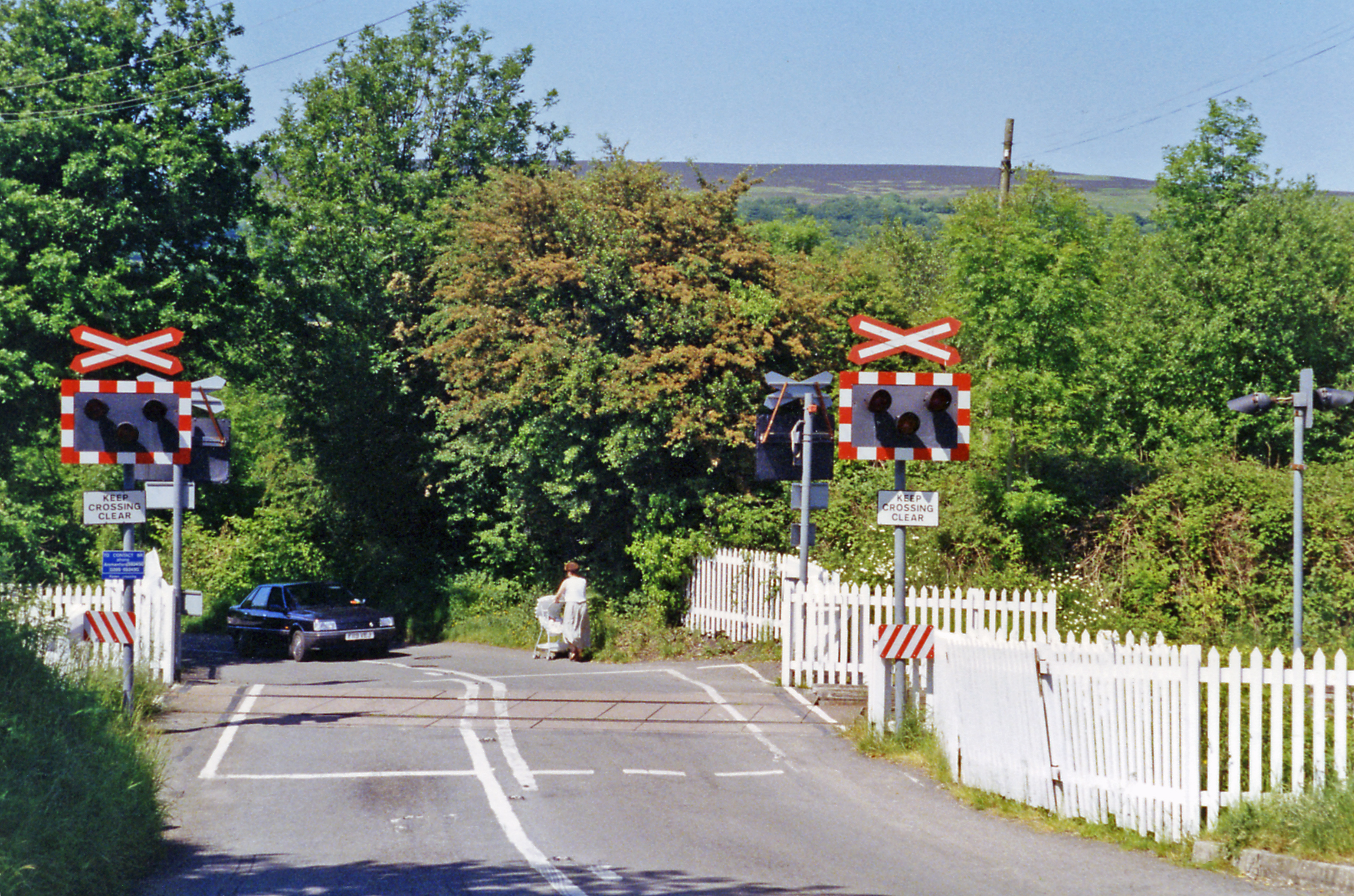
- The level crossing in 1994

General information
- Location: Garnant, Carmarthenshire; Wales
- Coordinates: 51.80268°N 3.90641°W
- Grid reference: SN687131

Other information
- Status: Disused

History
- Original company: Llanelly Railway
- Pre-grouping: London and North Western Railway
- Post-grouping: London, Midland and Scottish Railway

Key dates
- April 1840: Opened
- 20 March 1865: Resited
- 18 August 1958: Closed
Location

Garnant railway station served the village of Garnant, Carmarthenshire, Wales, from 1840 to 1958 on the Brynamman Branch.

== History ==
The station was opened as Cwmamman in April 1840 by the Llanelly Railway. Its name was later changed to Garnant. An order was made on 14 December 1859 to close the branch line by the end of the month, although this didn't happen as it was still in Bradshaw and the timetable from January to June 1860. It was resited half a mile to the west on 20 March 1865. It closed on 18 August 1958.

=== Garnant Halt ===
This was the name of the platforms for the line to Gwaun-Cae-Gurwen. They opened on 1 January 1908, closed on 2 April 1917 but reopened on 7 July 1919. They were temporarily closed on 11 April 1921 due to a coal strike but reopened on 1 July of the same year. They finally closed on 4 May 1926.

Preceding station	Historical railways	Following station
Brynamman East; Line and station closed	London and North Western Railway; Brynamman Branch	Gelliceidrim; Line open, station closed
Gors-y-Garnant; Line open, station closed	London and North Western Railway; Brynamman Branch	Gelliceidrim; Line open, station closed
