= Van Railway =

Railway line in Wales

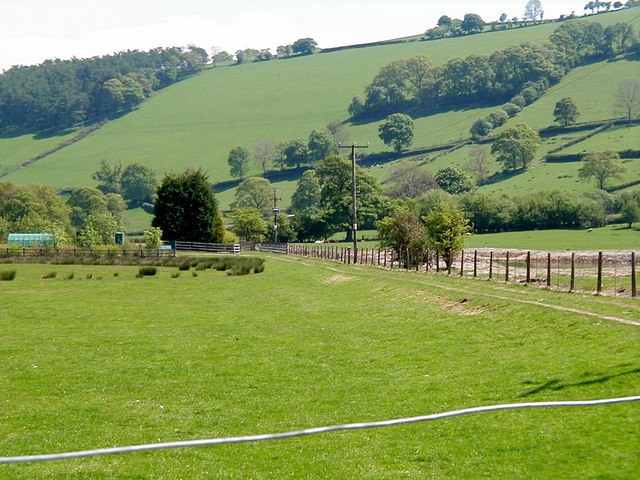
The former track bed.

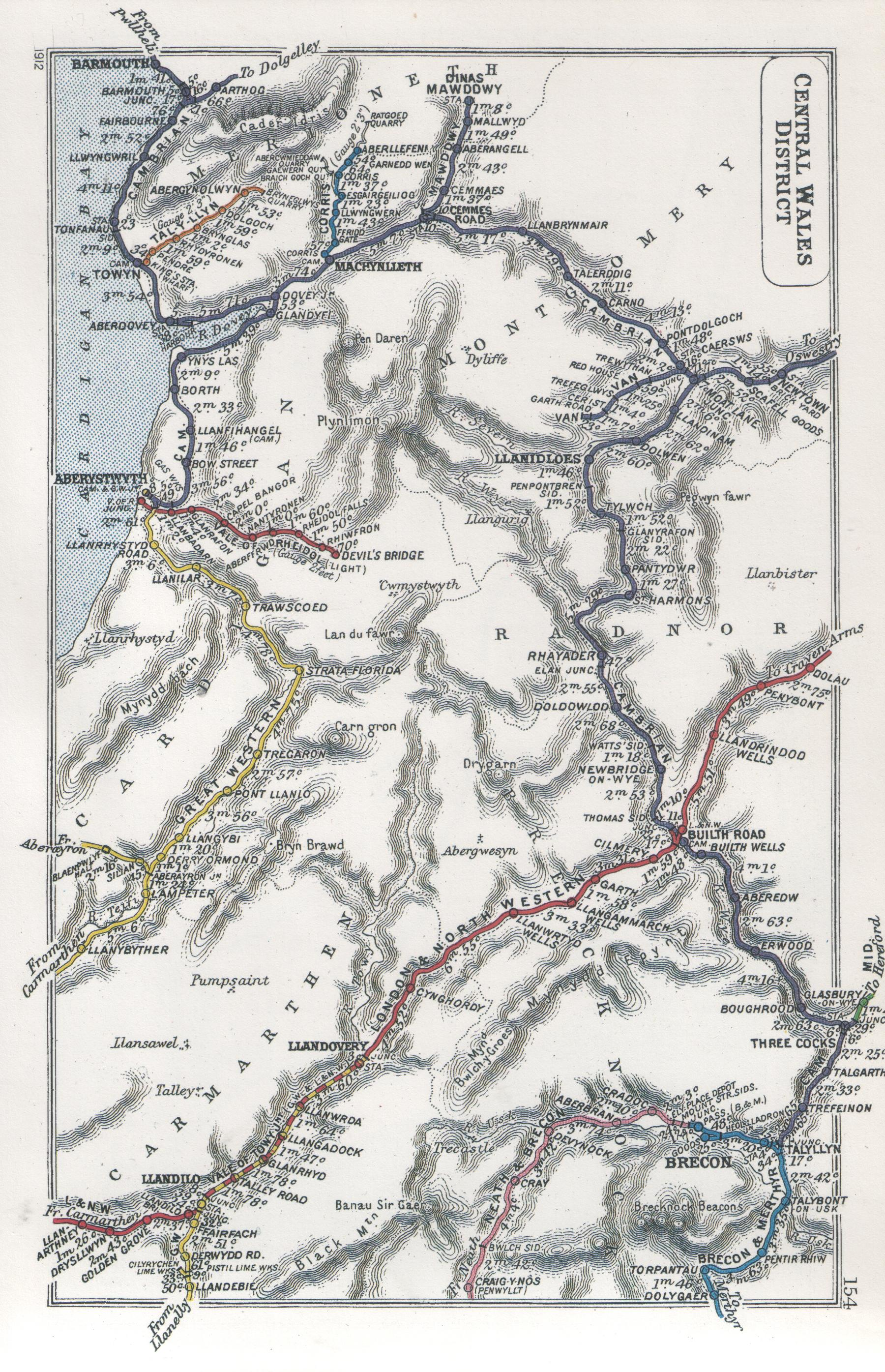
A 1912 Railway Clearing House map showing railways in Central Wales, including the Van Railway (upper right)

The Van Railway was a standard gauge railway in mid Wales. The line was built in 1871 to link the highly productive lead mines at Van, near Llanidloes to the main Cambrian line at Caersws. The mines closed in 1920, but the railway remained open until 1940.

== Route ==
The line ran westwards from Caersws along the Cerist and Trannon river valleys, with halts at Red House, Trefeglwys, Cerist and Garth & Van Road. An underground railway portal has been restored at the mine site.

== Traffic ==
Passengers were carried from 1873 until 1879. General freight was carried by the Cambrian Railways in 1896, to which company the line was leased. The railway was a private venture by Earl Vane, who also leased the mine to the mining company and was the chairman of the Cambrian Railway Company. It was built by David Davies of Llandinam, the contractor and colliery owner.

== John Ceiriog Hughes ==
Until his death in 1887, John Ceiriog Hughes was Manager of the Van Railway, and it is said that many passengers "made pilgrimage along its short length ... for a chance of conversing with one of (Wales') most notable characters".
