= Grange Lane railway station (South Yorkshire) =

Disused railway station in South Yorkshire, England

Grange Lane
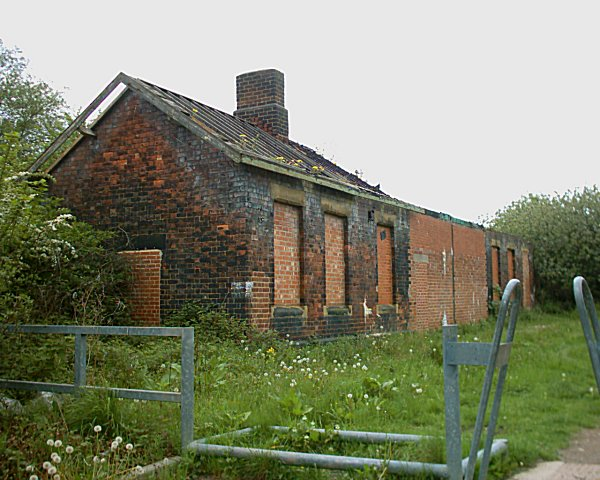
- The platform buildings in 2006

General information
- Location: Shiregreen, City of Sheffield; England
- Coordinates: 53.43785°N 1.43697°W
- Grid reference: SK375936
- Platforms: 2

Other information
- Status: Disused

History
- Original company: South Yorkshire Railway & River Dun Navigation
- Pre-grouping: Great Central Railway
- Post-grouping: London and North Eastern Railway

Key dates
- June 1855: Opened
- 7 December 1953: Closed
Location

Grange Lane railway station was a railway station located on the South Yorkshire Railway line between Sheffield and Barnsley in South Yorkshire, England. At the time of its building it was located alongside the lane from which it takes its name with few houses nearby. From the early 1890s it became the interchange point with coal traffic from Grange Colliery at Kimberworth in Rotherham, South Yorkshire. The colliery was sunk in 1891 and coal production ceased in 1963. The colliery site is now Grange Park golf course.

The station, opened in June 1855, consisted of two flanking platforms with buildings on each. The line and the crossing gates were controlled from a signal box situated at the end of the platform adjacent to the gates.

The station was closed on 7 December 1953 and most buildings existed until late 2011; the station building is a private residence.

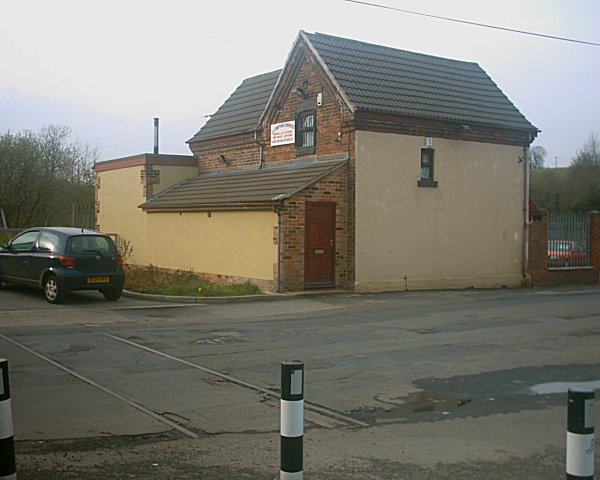
Grange Lane station building and level crossing
