= Wenlock, Craven Arms and Lightmoor Extension Railway =

Railway in Shropshire, England

Wenlock Railway Act 1861
- Act of Parliament
- Parliament of the United Kingdom
- Long title: An Act for making Railways from Much Wenlock to the Shrewsbury and Hereford Railway, and a Railway from the Much Wenlock and Severn Junction Railway into Coalbrookdale, with Branches and Works connected therewith; to authorize certain Arrangements with and confer certain Powers upon other Companies; and for other Purposes.
- Citation: 24 & 25 Vict. c. clxxxix

Dates
- Royal assent: 22 July 1861

The Wenlock Railway was a railway in Shropshire, England. It was built as two portions either end of the Much Wenlock and Severn Junction Railway between 1864 and 1867 and formed part of the Wellington to Craven Arms Railway. For much of its working life it was worked by the Great Western Railway and subsequently the Western Region of British Railways.

== Background ==
By early 1860, construction of the Severn Valley Railway was nearing completion and work was under way on the Much Wenlock and Severn Junction Railway (MW&SJR) company's branch from Buildwas to Much Wenlock. There were two logical next steps. The first was to continue northwards from Buildwas via a bridge over the River Severn to reach Coalbrookdale and from there join the Great Western and Wellington & Severn Junction at Lightmoor. The second was to extend south west from Much Wenlock, passing the limestone quarries at Presthope on Wenlock Edge, to reach the Shrewsbury and Hereford Railway near Craven Arms. These two extensions would allow the easy movement of limestone to the iron foundries of Coalbrookdale.

== Construction ==
A company was provisionally formed under the name of the Much Wenlock, Craven Arms and Coalbrookdale Railway with a proposed capital of £150,000, and John Fowler commissioned to carry out the preliminary survey. Plans and sections were completed in November 1860 and a bill presented to Parliament under the simplified title of the Wenlock Railway. On 22 July 1861 royal assent was given to the Wenlock Railway Act 1861 24 & 25 Vict. c. clxxxix. This authorised the making of "Railways from Much Wenlock to the Shrewsbury and Hereford Railway, and a Railway from the Much Wenlock and Severn Junction Railway into Coalbrookdale" The capital was reduced to £125,000. Brassey and Field were appointed contractors for the construction of both, having tendered £81,000 for the line between Much Wenlock and Craven Arms and £28,000 for the Coalbrookdale extension, excluding land, stations, sidings and signalling in each case.

=== Wenlock Railway: Buildwas to Coalbrookdale ===
The 1861 Act set out the arrangements for the GWR to operate the Coalbrookdale extension. The major engineering work on the extension was the Albert Edward Bridge over the River Severn. The estimated cost of building the extension was to be £40,000, of which the Wellington and Severn Junction Railway would subscribe £10,000, the Wenlock Railway £10,000, and the GWR £20,000. The GWR offered to fund and construct the remaining section of the line from Coalbrookdale to Lightmoor, for which the Great Western Railway (Lightmoor to Coalbrookdale, &c.) Act 1861 (24 & 25 Vict. c. cciv) was passed.

Construction of the Wenlock Railway's Coalbrookdale extension and the GWR extension, both of which were double track, were carried out concurrently by Brassey and Field, with both opening to traffic on 1 November 1864. The Coalbrookdale extension cost £32,604 excluding land.

=== Wenlock Railway: Much Wenlock to Craven Arms ===
Construction of the extension from Much Wenlock to the Shrewsbury and Hereford Railway near Craven Arms was more involved. Local opposition had forced the company to alter its intended route south of Wenlock Edge to an alignment further north; this involved a tunnel through the Edge west of Presthope. A new through station was built at Much Wenlock to replace the temporary terminus used by the MW&SJR. The work progressed, with the section from Much Wenlock to Presthope opening for goods and mineral traffic on 5 December 1864, enabling limestone from Wenlock Edge to be brought to Coalbrookdale.

The company was unable to raise further money through share sales, and decided in December 1863 not to proceed with the line onward to Craven Arms for the time being. At the time, no formal working agreement had been reached between the Wenlock Railway and the GWR for working the railway, and the Wenlock Railway wrote to the GWR implying that if the Craven Arms extension was not completed, parliamentary approval for a proposed line from Bridgnorth to Craven Arms via Corve Dale could result in traffic being lost to their rival, the LNWR. Agreement on terms was swiftly reached on 21 March 1864, including additional funding for the Coalbrookdale extension.

Wenlock Railway Companies Act 1864
- Act of Parliament
- Parliament of the United Kingdom
- Long title: An Act for authorizing certain Arrangements between the Much Wenlock and Severn Junction Railway Company and Wenlock Railway Company and the Great Western Railway Company; and for extending the Time for the compulsory Purchase of Property required for the Wenlock Railway; and for other Purposes.
- Citation: 27 & 28 Vict. c. cccii

Dates
- Royal assent: 29 July 1864

Text of statute as originally enacted

With those terms agreed, the Wenlock Railway and MW&SJR began planning an amalgamation, presenting a Bill to the House of Lords in June 1864. The GWR objected, and at the Lords' suggestion the terms were revised and the 'amalgamation' became 'arrangements' which were acceptable to all parties. The Wenlock Railway Companies Act 1864 (27 & 28 Vict. c. cccii) set out those arrangements, including an extension of the time allowed for purchase of land necessary to complete the Craven Arms extension. In April 1865 an agreement was drawn up between the Wenlock Railway, John Fowler, Thomas Brassey, and the GWR. Fowler and Brassey agreed to receive shares rather than cash as payment for their services totalling £4,500 and £70,500 respectively; Brassey also agreed to loan the Wenlock Railway a further £16,500 for land purchases if needed. The GWR contributed £5,000 towards the cost of infrastructure. These arrangements enabled the Wenlock Railway to resume construction; Brassey's major investment in the railway saw his navvies working 24 hours per day in shifts to complete the extension.

By the end of September 1867 the line on to Marsh Farm was thought to be ready, but Colonel Rich for the Board of Trade raised a number of issues. In particular he condemned the rail chairs of 21 lb. and 22 lb., saying they were too light and had to be replaced by 30 lb. chairs. After two further inspections on 12 November and 7 December, Colonel Rich approved of the line, and the entire line from Buildwas to Marsh Farm Junction was opened to passenger traffic on 16 December 1867.

== Stations ==
- Lightmoor Junction; convergence of S&BR Madeley branch
- Lightmoor; opened 2 May 1859; closed 1 November 1864;
- Start of GWR Coalbrookdale Extension;
- Lightmoor Platform; opened 12 August 1907; closed 1 January 1917; reopened 23 June 1919; closed 23 July 1962;
- Green Bank Halt; opened 12 March 1934; closed 23 July 1962;
- Start of Wenlock Railway;
- Coalbrookdale; opened 1 November 1864; closed 23 July 1962;
- Buildwas; opened 1 February 1862; closed 9 September 1963; Severn Valley Railway station;
- Start of Much Wenlock and Severn Junction Railway
- Farley Halt; opened 24 October 1934; closed 23 July 1962;
- Much Wenlock; opened 1 February 1862; relocated 19 April 1866; closed 23 July 1962;
- Start of Wenlock Railway;
- Stretton Westwood Crossing Halt; opened 1933 for quarrymen; renamed Westwood Halt and opened for general use 7 December 1935; closed 31 December 1951;
- Presthope; opened 16 December 1867; closed 31 December 1951;
- Easthope Halt; opened 4 April 1936; closed 31 December 1951;
- Longville; opened 16 December 1867; closed 31 December 1951;
- Rushbury; opened 16 December 1867; closed 31 December 1951;
- Harton; opened 16 December 1867; renamed Harton Road 1881; closed 31 December 1951;
- Marsh Farm Junction; convergence with Shrewsbury and Hereford Railway.

== Operation ==
Services were operated by the GWR from opening. The Wenlock Railway and MW&SJR companies were both fully absorbed into the GWR at midnight on 30 June 1896.

A GWR steam rail motor service was introduced on 1 May 1906, covering all areas of the Wellington to Craven Arms Railway. Five cars were allocated for this, with the three cars used in daily service stabled at Much Wenlock overnight, and two spares kept at Wellington. The railmotors' weakness was the small passenger capacity; hauling a trailer proved difficult on the steeply graded routes. An unusual configuration of two railmotors sandwiching a trailer car was used at busy times but proved to be unreliable. As a result they were considered unsuccessful on the Wenlock lines, and services reverted to locomotive hauled trans at the end of 1906.

In 1929 work began on construction of Ironbridge power station. This was situated next to the River Severn between Buildwas station and the Albert Edward Bridge, and was served by a large number of sidings. The station opened on 13 October 1932. Coal was delivered by rail to Buildwas via the Madeley branch, and also from Highley colliery via the Severn Valley branch.

By the early 1930s passenger numbers were declining due to the growth in car usage and improved reliability of bus services. In response the GWR opened a series of unmanned halts along the Wellington to Craven Arms Railway. Between Much Wenlock and Craven Arms, Westwood Halt opened for public use on 7 December 1935 and Easthope Halt opened on 4 April 1936.

== Closure ==
On 1 January 1948 the Wellington to Craven Arms Railway became part of the Western Region of British Railways. Traffic had become so light that the passenger service between Much Wenlock and Craven Arms was withdrawn on 31 December 1951. Passenger services from Much Wenlock to Buildwas and Wellington were withdrawn on 1 August 1962. However the line Madeley Junction via Lightmoor Junction to Buildwas remained open for the transport of coal to Ironbridge Power Station until its closure in 2015.

In October 2021 the Revolution VLR (RVLR) demonstrator vehicle was demonstrated on a section of the line at the Ironbridge Power Station site, for which a platform and other facilities were built.

Sections of the trackbed between Much Wenlock and Craven Arms now form part of the Jack Mytton Way long distance pathway.

== See also ==
- Albert Edward Bridge spanning the River Severn at Coalbrookdale.

== Sources ==
- Knowles, Adrian (2022). The Wellington, Much Wenlock and Craven Arms Railway. Lydney: Lightmoor Press. ISBN 9781911038993.
- Marshall, John (1989). The Severn Valley Railway. Newton Abbot: David St John Thomas. ISBN 0-946537-45-3.
