= Much Wenlock and Severn Junction Railway =

Transport company in the United Kingdom

Much Wenlock and Severn Junction Railway Act 1862
- Act of Parliament
- Parliament of the United Kingdom
- Long title: An Act to authorize the Much Wenlock and Severn Junction Railway Company to raise further Sums of Money, and to subscribe an additional Sum to the Wenlock Railway; and for other Purposes.
- Citation: 25 & 26 Vict. c. xiv

Dates
- Royal assent: 16 May 1862

The Much Wenlock and Severn Junction Railway (MW&SJR) was a railway in Shropshire, England, established by the Much Wenlock and Severn Railway Company and constructed between 1860 and 1862. It formed part of the group of companies which together constituted the Wellington to Craven Arms Railway. For much of its working life, the railway was operated by the Great Western Railway and subsequently the Western Region of British Railways.

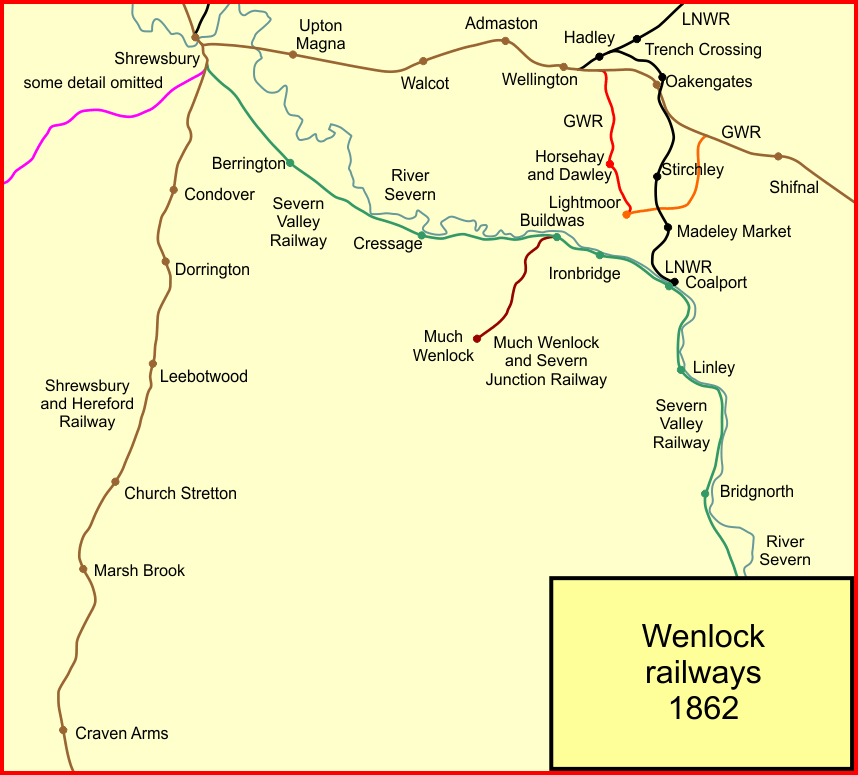
The MW&SJR and other railways in 1862

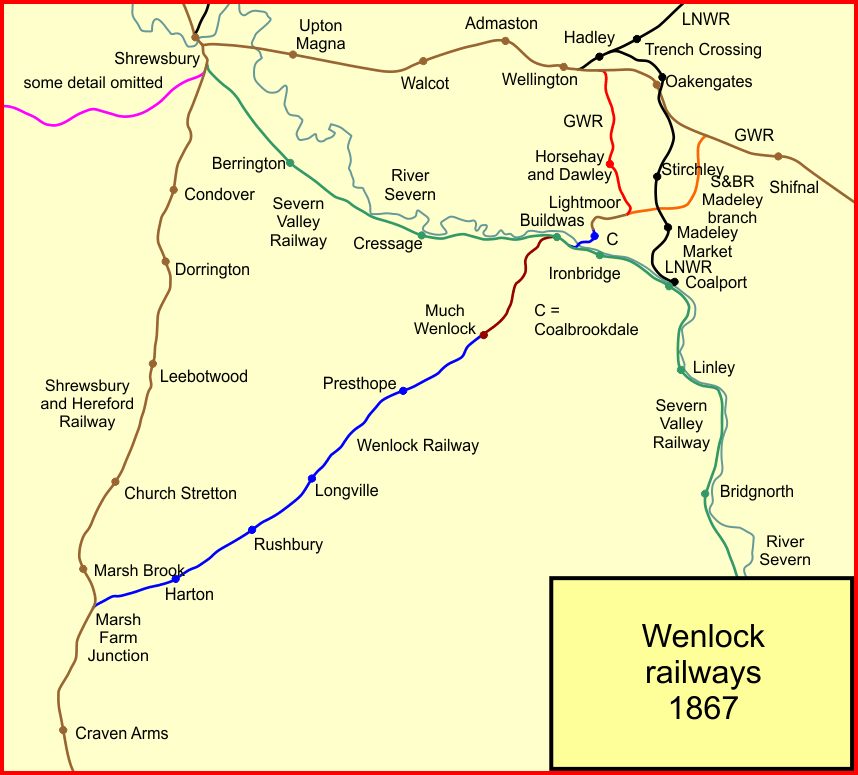
Wenlock to Craven Arms in 1867

== Construction ==
The Severn Valley Railway (SVR) was authorised on 20 August 1853, and when built would bring a railway line to Buildwas. Interested parties in Much Wenlock, some four miles away, also saw the potential of linking their town to the growing railway network. A meeting held in September 1853 was supportive, and a preliminary survey by an engineer named Taylor suggested that the line was feasible, albeit with a ruling gradient of 1 in 45. However there was no point in proceeding until it was certain that the SVR would go ahead. Difficulties in raising funding almost resulted in the abandonment of the SVR, but construction eventually started in August 1858, some five years later.

With construction of the SVR under way, John Fowler (who had succeeded Taylor) prepared the plans for the MW&SJR, assisted by Henry Orlando Bridgman. From a single platform at Buildwas railway station, the line initially rose towards Much Wenlock at a gradient on 1 in 48, climbing a total of 352ft on gradients as steep as 1 in 40. Beyond Buildwas station, the line joined the Severn Valley Railway; a short extension also passed under the Severn Valley Railway to a wharf on the River Severn.

The proposal went to Parliament, and on 21 July 1859 royal assent was given to the Much Wenlock and Severn Junction Railway Act 1859 (22 & 23 Vict. c. xxvi). The act authorised a railway from Much Wenlock to join the Severn Valley Railway (then under construction) at Buildwas; the authorised capital was £24,000. The appointed contractors were Brassey and Field, and construction began in March 1860.

A Board of Trade inspection of the line was carried out by Colonel William Yolland on 30 December 1861, who was concerned about the steep gradients. He required weighted safety points to be fitted to prevent runaways reaching the Severn Valley line; also the turntable at Much Wenlock was not fitted and signals were not working. These concerns were swiftly addressed, and on 30 January 1862 he made a second visit, this time agreeing to the opening. The line between Much Wenlock and Buildwas opened on 1 February 1862 for passenger and goods traffic; the opening day was the same day as the opening of the Severn Valley Railway between Shrewsbury and Hartlebury.

== Stations ==
- Much Wenlock; opened 1 February 1862; closed 23 July 1962;
- Farley Halt; opened 24 October 1934; closed 23 July 1962;
- Buildwas; opened 1 February 1862; closed 9 September 1963; Severn Valley Railway station;

== Operations ==
At the end of 1861 the MW&SJR had entered into a 10-year agreement with the GWR who would provide and operate all the trains, supply the staff and maintain the Wenlock branch. The Severn Valley Railway was leased and operated from the outset by the West Midland Railway (WMR) and, despite the GWR agreement, it was the WMR which provided the initial service of six trains in each direction between Buildwas and Much Wenlock. The WMR was amalgamated into the GWR on 1 August 1863.

While the MW&SJR was still under construction, a separate company, the Wenlock Railway (originally planned as the "Much Wenlock, Craven Arms and Coalbrookdale Railway") was authorised on 22 July 1861. This had two objectives, to extend southwards from Much Wenlock to join the Shrewsbury and Hereford Railway near Craven Arms, and to extend northwards from Buildwas to Coalbrookdale in the Ironbridge Gorge. The northward extension opened on 1 November 1864, completing the route through to the north end of the Wellington to Craven Arms Railway. The southern section opened as far as Presthope the following month, enabling limestone to be transported from the Wenlock Edge quarries to the Coalbrookdale iron foundries. However delays in funding meant the southwards extension was not completed until December 1867. Services on both the MW&SJR and Wenlock Railway were worked by the GWR under an agreement dated 24 March 1864, and were vested in the GWR in 1896.

By the early 1930s passenger numbers were declining due to the growth in car usage and improved reliability of bus services. In response the GWR opened a series of unmanned halts along the Wellington to Craven Arms Railway. Farley Halt, between Buildwas and Much Wenlock, opened on 27 October 1934.

== Closure ==
On 1 January 1948 the Wellington to Craven Arms Railway became part of the Western Region of British Railways. Traffic had become so light that the passenger service between Much Wenlock and Craven Arms was withdrawn on 31 December 1951. Passenger services from Much Wenlock to Buildwas and Wellington were withdrawn on 1 August 1962.

== Bibliography ==
- Mitchell, Vic; Smith, Keith (2008). Craven Arms to Wellington. Middleton Press. figs. 34-50. ISBN 9781906008338. OCLC 750867075.
- Knowles, Adrian (2022). The Wellington, Much Wenlock and Craven Arms Railway. Lydney: Lightmoor Press. ISBN 9781911038993.
- Marshall, John (1989). The Severn Valley Railway. Newton Abbot: David St John Thomas. ISBN 0-946537-45-3.
