= Craven Arms railway station =

Railway station in Shropshire, England

Craven Arms
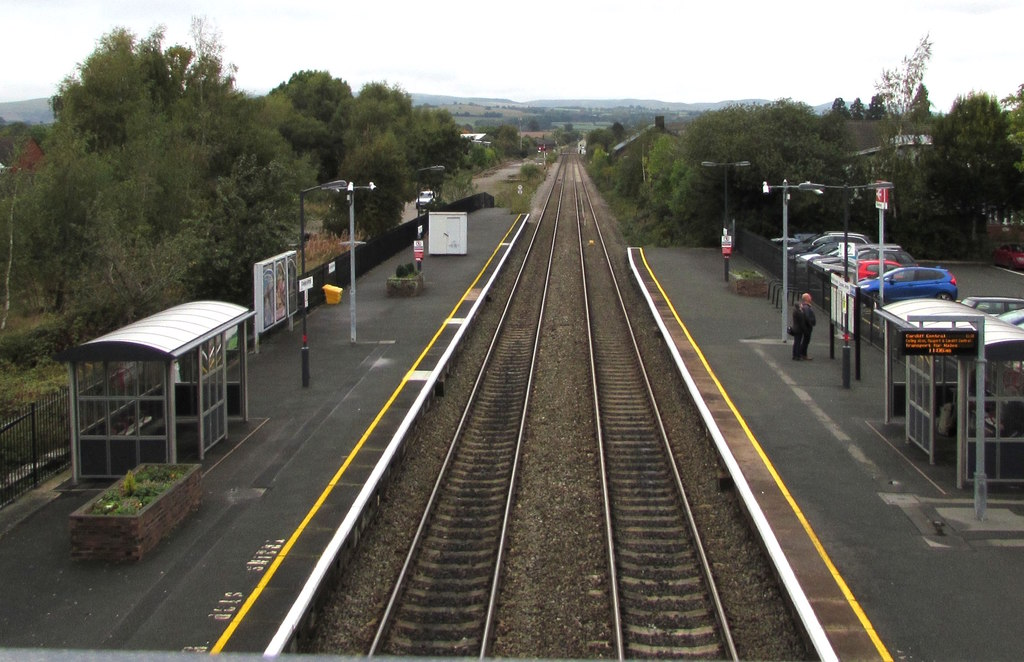
- Craven Arms railway station, looking north

General information
- Location: Craven Arms, Shropshire; England
- Coordinates: 52.4425°N 2.8375°W
- Grid reference: SO431830
- Managed by: Transport for Wales
- Platforms: 2

Other information
- Station code: CRV
- Classification: DfT category F1

History
- Opened: 1852

Passengers
- 2020/21: ▼23,912
- Interchange: ▼1,462
- 2021/22: ▲71,224
- Interchange: ▲2,058
- 2022/23: ▲93,000
- Interchange: ▼1,850
- 2023/24: ▼86,754
- Interchange: ▲1,954
- 2024/25: ▲99,908
- Interchange: ▼1,368
Location
Notes
- Passenger statistics from the Office of Rail and Road

Craven Arms railway station serves the town of Craven Arms, in Shropshire, England. Until 1974, it was known as Craven Arms and Stokesay, after the nearby coaching inn (the town having not come into being prior to the arrival of the railways) and the historic settlement of Stokesay to the south. It is situated at the junction of the Welsh Marches Line and the Heart of Wales Line, 20 miles (32 km) south of Shrewsbury. All passenger trains calling at the station are operated by Transport for Wales, which also manages it.

== History ==
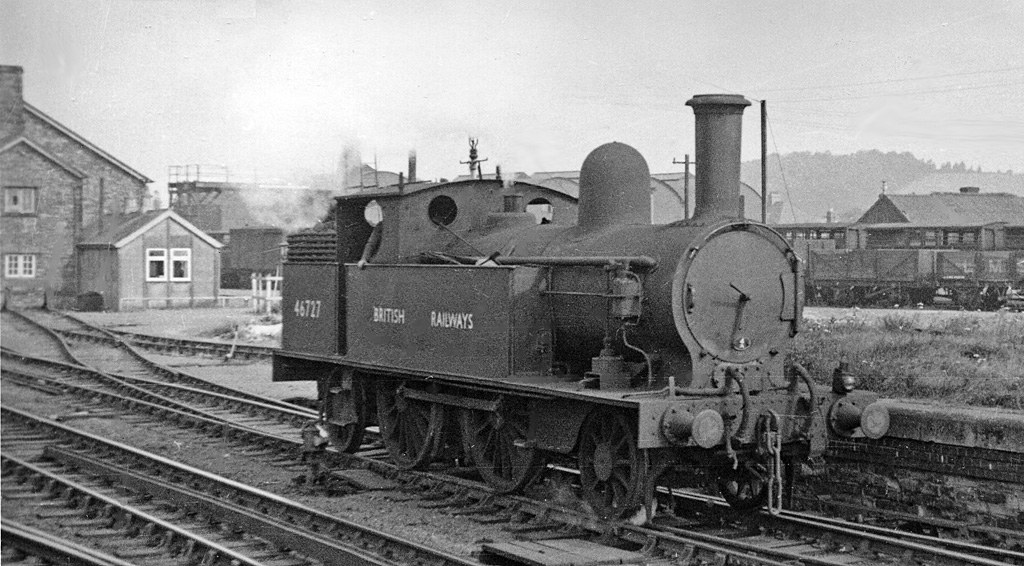
The station in 1949

The Shrewsbury and Hereford Railway company was the first to serve the town, arriving from the north in 1852 and completing its route through to Hereford the following year. The Knighton Railway constructed the first of the three branches from the main line between 1858 and 1861. The second branch was that of the Bishops Castle Railway, which arrived in 1865 via a junction with the main line about 1 km to the north. The route from Much Wenlock was completed by the Wenlock, Craven Arms and Lightmoor Extension railway in 1867, joining the main line a few miles north of the town at Marsh Farm Junction.

Between 1865 and 1935, Craven Arms was the junction terminus of the Bishops Castle Railway. There was also a junction serving the line that went to Wellington via Much Wenlock. Adjacent to the station once stood the now demolished carriage sheds. There continues to be a signal box at Craven Arms, to the north of the station by the level crossing.

The London and North Western Railway and Great Western Railway leased the main line jointly in 1862, whilst the modest Knighton branch would eventually be extended right through to Swansea by the LNWR over the course of the next decade. The Bishops Castle branch, which spent its entire existence in receivership closed in 1935. The Much Wenlock line by contrast would remain little altered throughout its life, although the GWR did take control of it soon after opening; its passenger trains ceased in 1951. The station's locomotive shed closed in 1964 and goods traffic ceased in May 1968.

== Facilities ==
The station is unstaffed and now has no permanent buildings other than standard metal and plexiglass waiting shelters on each platform; the main buildings on each side were demolished by 1972. A self-service ticket machine is provided for intending passengers; this can also be used for collecting pre-paid tickets. Train running information is offered via CIS displays, timetable posters and a customer help point on each platform. A footbridge links both platforms, but step-free also offered on each side - this does though require a sizeable detour via local roads if changing platforms.

== Layout ==
The station has two platforms, connected by a footbridge:

- Platform 1, on the west side, facilitates northbound trains to Shrewsbury and beyond as well as trains from Swansea via the Heart of Wales Line.
- Platform 2, on the town side of the station, provides southbound trains to Hereford and Cardiff Central and also southbound Heart of Wales services since signalling and track alterations in October 2018.

Prior to these changes, southbound trains to Llanelli and beyond used platform 1 in both directions, the crossover that gave access to the branch being sited to the north near Long Lane crossing; this has now been relocated to the south end of the station.

== Services ==
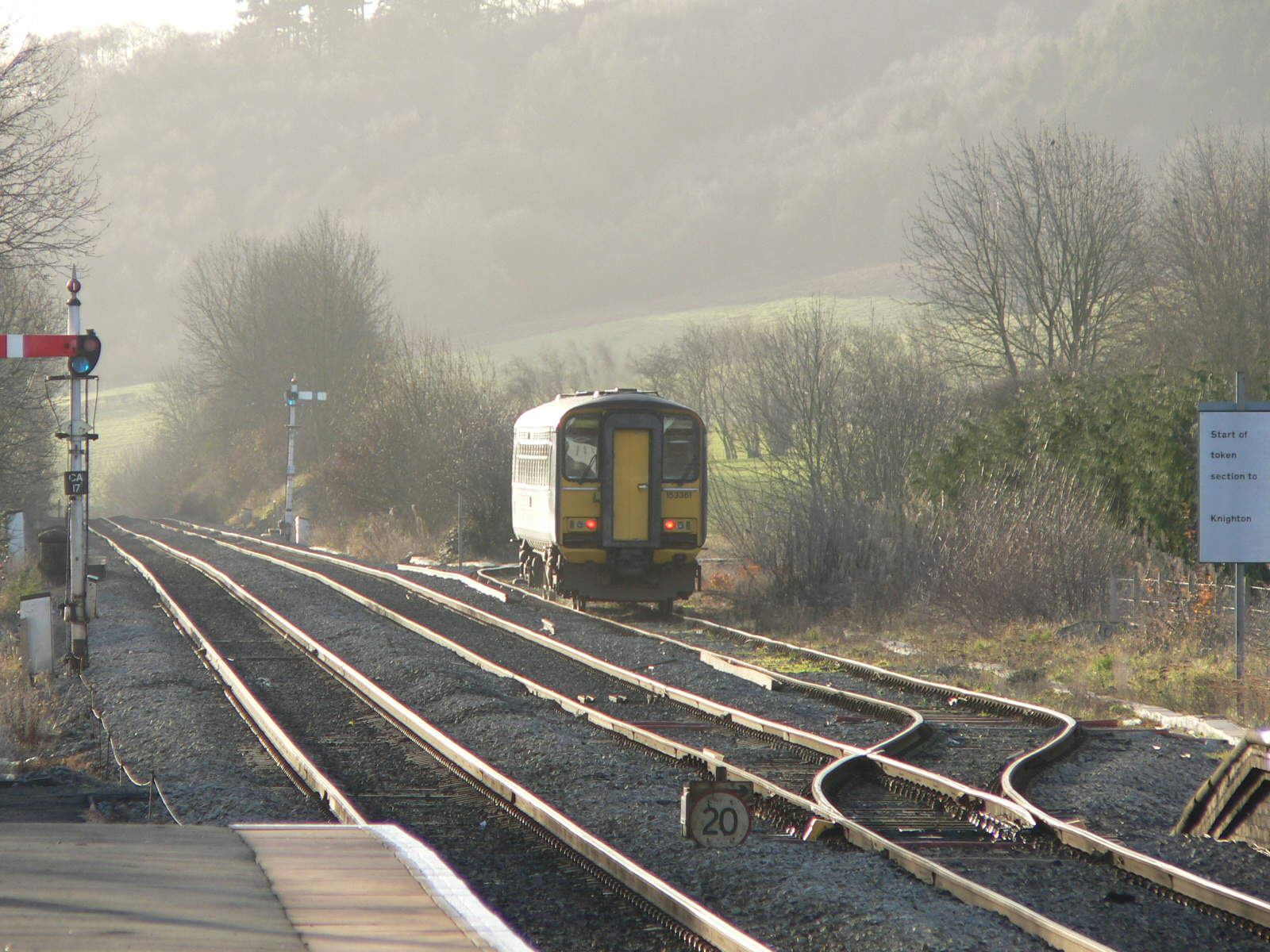
The junction at the south end of the station. A Heart of Wales Line service to Swansea departs

Transport for Wales provides the following service pattern:

- Trains from Carmarthen and Cardiff Central to Manchester Piccadilly call at the station every two hours in both directions.
- Most Holyhead to Cardiff trains also call here every two hours. On Sundays, the frequency is irregular, and there are no departures until mid-morning.
- There are five trains a day, with two on Sundays, in each direction between Swansea and Shrewsbury; there is one more as far as Llandrindod Wells, except on Saturdays, along the Heart of Wales Line.

Preceding station	National Rail	Following station
Ludlow	Transport for Wales; Welsh Marches Line	Church Stretton
Broome	Transport for Wales; Heart of Wales Line	Church Stretton
	Disused railways	
Wistanstow Halt; Line open, station closed	LNWR and GWR joint Shrewsbury and Hereford Railway	Onibury; Line open, station closed
Terminus	GWR Wellington to Craven Arms Railway; Wenlock, Craven Arms and Lightmoor Extension Railway	Harton Road; Line and station closed
Stretford Bridge Junction Halt; Line and station closed	Bishops Castle Railway	Terminus
