= Llandeilo railway station =

Railway station in Carmarthenshire, Wales

Llandeilo
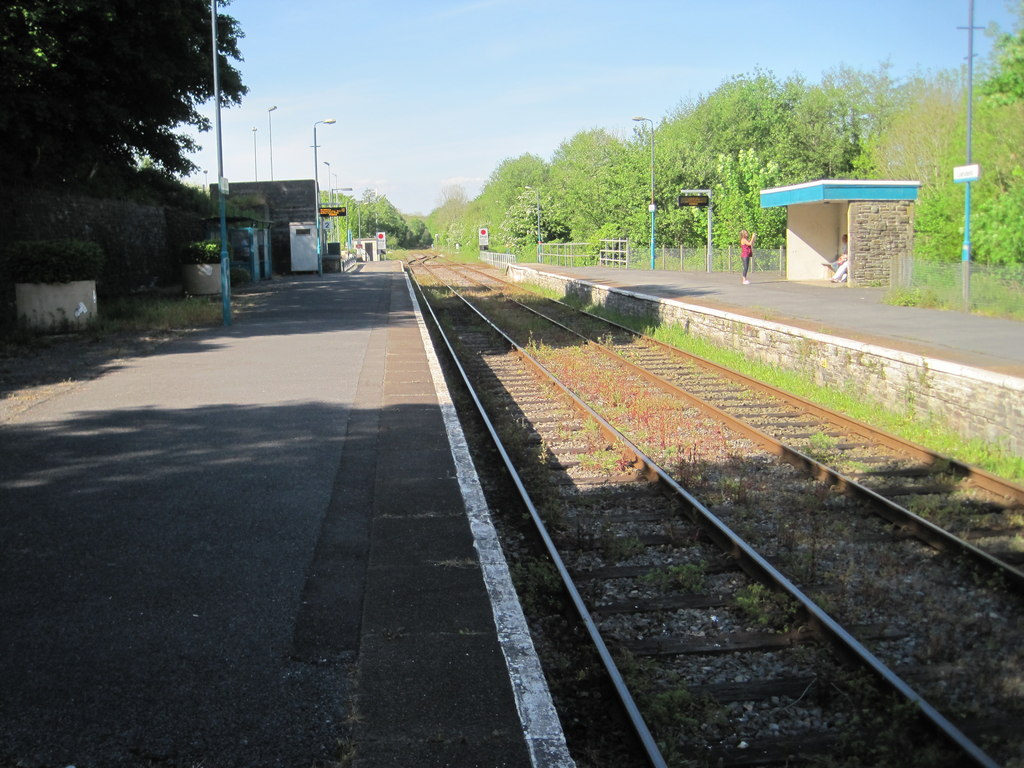

General information
- Location: Llandeilo, Carmarthenshire; Wales
- Coordinates: 51.885°N 3.987°W
- Grid reference: SN633226
- Manager: Transport for Wales
- Platforms: 2

Other information
- Station code: LLL
- Classification: DfT category F1

History
- Opened: 1857

Passengers
- 2021/22: ▲7,932
- 2022/23: ▲11,078
- 2023/24: ▲14,300
- 2024/25: ▲15,906
- 2025/26: ▼15,110
Location
Notes
- Passenger statistics from the Office of Rail and Road

Llandeilo railway station (formerly Llandilo Junction for the Carmarthen Line) serves the town of Llandeilo, Carmarthenshire in Wales. The station is 30 3/4 miles (49 km) north east of Swansea on the Heart of Wales Line.

The station is located below the eastern side of the town beside the River Tywi. Dinefwr Castle is within walking distance. All trains serving the station are operated by Transport for Wales.

== History ==
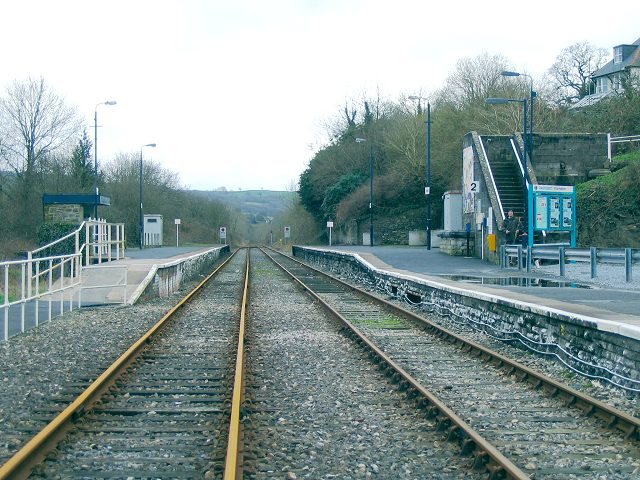
Llandeilo railway station (February 2007)

The station was built by the Llanelly Railway, who reached the town from the Llanelli direction in January 1857. An extension to Llandovery was constructed by the subsidiary Vale of Towy Railway (opening in 1858), whilst the branch line to Carmarthen followed in 1864–65 and a direct line to Swansea Victoria along the Gower Peninsula in 1866–/67. The following year saw the Central Wales Extension Railway reach Llandovery, putting Llandeilo on a through route to Craven Arms but also giving the London and North Western Railway (LNWR) access to the Llanelly company's territory and lines through a new joint lease of the VoTR. The LNWR took full advantage of this and by 1873 had secured full access to & control of the Swansea and Carmarthen routes, leaving the Llanelly Railway with only half its peak track mileage and in such a poor financial position that it was forced to lease its remaining lines to the Great Western Railway the same year. Thereafter the LNWR became the main passenger operator, with the Great Western running just a few trains between Llanelli and Llandovery.

In its heyday, the station had four platforms, used by trains for the Heart of Wales line as well as trains from Carmarthen via the Llandeilo – Abergwili Junction branch line (closed in 1963). The direct line to Swansea Victoria closed in 1964, with the surviving passenger trains diverted via the old Llanelly Railway main line south of Pontarddulais and the West Wales Line to reach Swansea.

The station building has been demolished, and between 2008 and the spring of 2010 only one platform was in use as the passing loop here had been temporarily locked out of use due to a lack of spare parts for the (obsolete) point machines. The second (southbound) platform was reinstated in May 2010 along with the loop following the replacement of the points at both ends with new electrically worked units. (All five loops were treated as part of a renewal programme costing over £4 million.)

== Facilities ==
The station is unstaffed (so tickets must be purchased on the train) and has only basic amenities - waiting shelters, timetable poster boards and digital CIS screens on each side, along with a customer help point on platform 2. Access for disabled passengers is limited, due to the barrow crossing linking the platforms and steep access ramps.

== Services ==
There are five through trains a day in each direction southbound to Swansea and northbound to Shrewsbury from Monday to Saturday; one more service runs to Llandovery and back to Swansea in the a.m peak (except Saturdays) . The facility to pass northbound and southbound trains is used once each early weekday morning. One additional through service each way was reinstated in December 2025, having been withdrawn at the winter 2023 timetable change. Two trains each way call on Sundays.

Preceding station	National Rail	Following station
Ffairfach	Transport for Wales; Heart of Wales Line	Llangadog
	Disused railways	
Llandilo Bridge; Line and station closed	London and North Western Railway; Llanelly Railway	Talley Road Halt; Line open, station closed

== Bibliography ==
- Caton, Peter (2018). Remote Stations. Leicestershire: Matador. ISBN 978-1-78901-408-2.
- Organ, John (2008). Mitchell, Vic (ed.). Craven Arms to Llandeilo. West Sussex: Middleton Press. figs. 117-120. ISBN 9781906008352. OCLC 648080889.
