= VOTR =

VOTR or VoTR may refer to:

- Tiruchirappalli International Airport, Tamil Nadu, India, by IATA airport code
- Vale of Towy Railway, a defunct Welsh railway company
