= Marsh Farm (disambiguation) =

Marsh Farm is a suburb of Luton, Bedfordshire, England.

Marsh Farm may also refer to:

- Marsh Farm Junction, a railway junction in Shropshire
- Inner Marsh Farm, a nature reserve on the Dee Estuary
- Marsh Farm, a cottage on the Sandringham Estate in Norfolk
- Marsh Farmhouse, a house in Lancashire
