= Glanrhyd Halt railway station =

Disused railway station in Llandeilo, Carmarthenshire

Glanrhyd
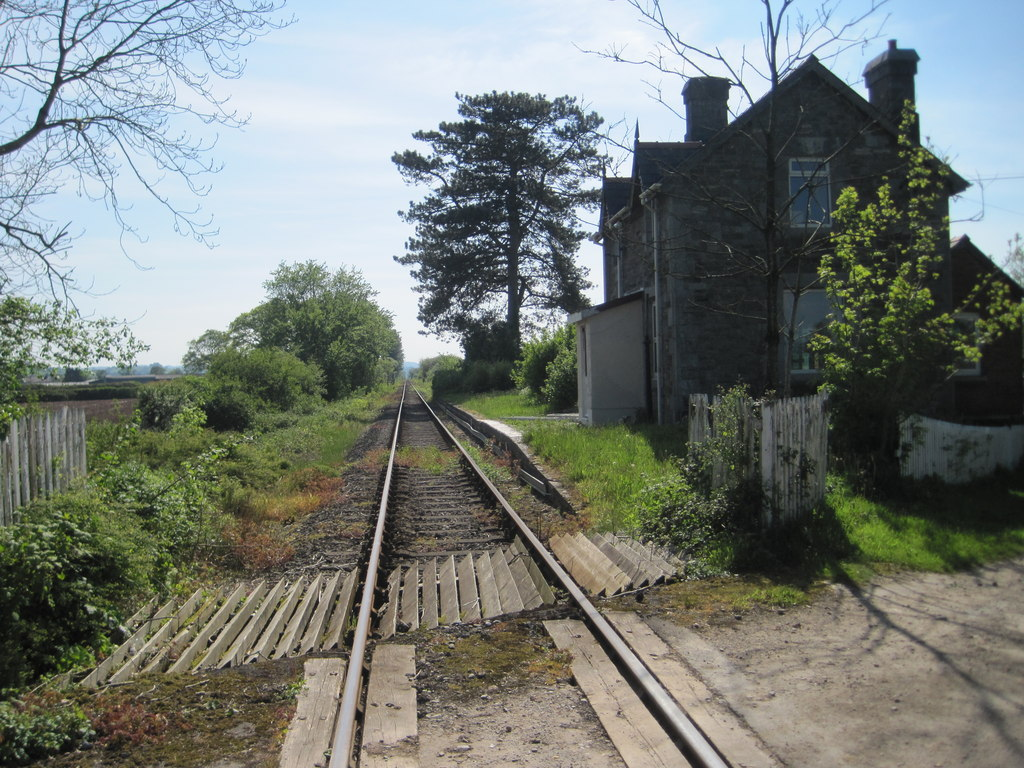
- The site of the station, looking southwest towards Talley Road Halt, 1980's

General information
- Location: Llandeilo, Carmarthenshire; Wales
- Coordinates: 51.9228°N 3.9158°W
- Grid reference: SN683266
- Platforms: 1

Other information
- Status: Disused

History
- Original company: Vale of Towy Railway
- Pre-grouping: Great Western Railway
- Post-grouping: Great Western Railway

Key dates
- May 1858: Opened as Glanrhyd
- 20 July 1931: Closed
- 19 December 1938: Reopened as Glanrhyd Halt
- 7 March 1955: Closed permanently
Location

Glanrhyd railway station served the town of Llandeilo, Carmarthenshire, Wales, from 1858 to 1955 on the Vale of Towy Railway.

== History ==
The station was opened as Glanrhyd in May 1858 by the Vale of Towy Railway. It was known as Glan Rhyd in the handbook of stations. It closed on 20 July 1931 but reopened as Glanrhyd Halt on 19 December 1938. It closed permanently on 7 March 1955. It was later converted to a private house and in 2025 was still in situ with its platform.

Preceding station	Disused railways	Following station
Llangadog; Line and station closed	Vale of Towy Railway	Talley Road Halt; Line and station closed
