= Rushbury railway station =

Former railway station in Shropshire, England

Rushbury

General information
- Location: Rushbury, Shropshire; England
- Coordinates: 52.5189°N 2.7134°W
- Grid reference: SO516914
- Platforms: 1

Other information
- Status: Disused

History
- Original company: Wenlock, Craven Arms and Lightmoor Extension Railway
- Pre-grouping: Great Western Railway
- Post-grouping: Great Western Railway

Key dates
- 16 December 1867: Opened
- 31 December 1951: Closed
Location

Rushbury railway station was a station in Rushbury, Shropshire, England. The station was opened in 1867 and closed in 1951. In 1892 a 15-lever signal box was added at the end of the platform. The station had two members of staff, a station master and signal man who performed all the required duties

The station is now a private residence.

Preceding station	Disused railways	Following station
Harton Road; Line and station closed	Great Western Railway; Wellington to Craven Arms Railway	Longville; Line and station closed
