= Dryslwyn railway station =

Disused railway station in Llandeilo, Carmarthenshire

Dryslwyn
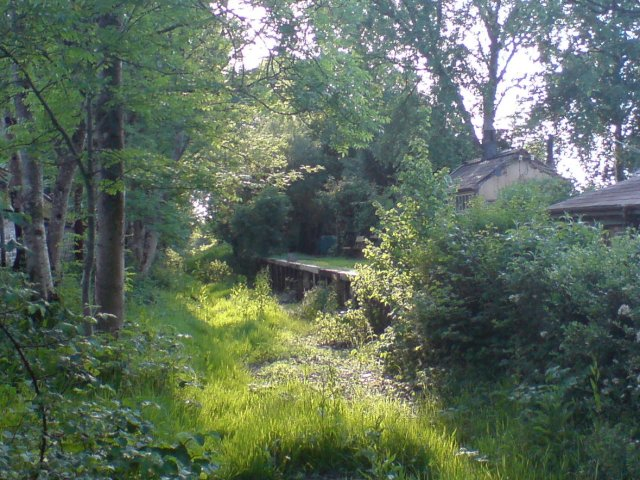
- The site of the station in 2007

General information
- Location: Llandeilo, Carmarthenshire; Wales
- Coordinates: 51.8588°N 4.1009°W
- Grid reference: SN554198
- Platforms: 1

Other information
- Status: Disused

History
- Original company: Llanelly Railway
- Pre-grouping: London and North Western Railway
- Post-grouping: London, Midland and Scottish Railway

Key dates
- 1 June 1865: Opened
- 6 September 1963: Closed
Location

== History ==
The station opened on 1 June 1865 by the Llanelly Railway. It was situated on the north side of the line, west of the level crossing. A siding and a small goods yard were located east of the level crossing. The station closed, along with the line, on 6 September 1963. A few station buildings, the platform, and one of the level crossing gates still survive.

Preceding station	Historical railways	Following station
Llanarthney Halt; Line and station closed	Llanelly Railway	Golden Grove; Line and station closed
