= Listed buildings in Buildwas =

Buildwas is a civil parish in Shropshire, England. It contains 21 listed buildings that are recorded in the National Heritage List for England. Of these, two are listed at Grade I, the highest of the three grades, and the others are at Grade II, the lowest grade. The parish contains the village of Buildwas and the surrounding countryside. The most important buildings in the parish are Buildwas Abbey, now in ruins, and Abbey House, the former abbot's lodgings; both are listed at Grade I. The other listed buildings are houses, cottages, farmhouses, a church and memorials in the churchyard, a wall, and a milestone.

== Key ==
Grade	Criteria
I	Buildings of exceptional interest, sometimes considered to be internationally important
II	Buildings of national importance and special interest

== Buildings ==
Name and location	Photograph	Date	Notes	Grade
Buildwas Abbey; 52.63538°N 2.52856°W		Late 12th century	The abbey is in ruins, the remains are in limestone, and they are virtually roofless. The remains consist of the church, (consisting of the nave, the crossing tower, the transepts, and the foundations of the aisles), the north claustral buildings, the east range, and the foundations of parts of the west range. The remains are also a Scheduled Monument.	I
Remains of wall southwest of Buildwas Abbey; 52.63484°N 2.53057°W	—	Late 12th century	The wall is in limestone, it is about 20 metres (66 ft) long, and has a maximum height of 1.5 metres (4 ft 11 in).	II
Abbey House, arcade and dovecote 52.63577°N 2.52801°W	—	13th century	Originally the abbot's lodgings and infirmary, and later used for other purposes, it was remodelled in the 16th to 17th century, and extended and altered in the 19th century. The building is in limestone with tiled roofs, it has an L-shaped plan with two ranges at right angles, and there are two storeys and attics. The west wing contains a first-floor hall over an undercroft, the south wing has five bays, and late additions were made in the angle. The older windows are lancets, the later ones are casements, and there is an early 20th-century canted bay window. Attached to the northwest corner is a five-bay arcade containing a brick gabled dovecote.	I
Bridge House; 52.63690°N 2.52483°W		Late 16th century (probable)	A farmhouse, later a private house, the original part was a three-hall with a gabled cross-wing to the right. In the 19th century a projecting gabled two-bay wing was added to the left. The original part is timber framed with plaster infill, the later part is in brick, and the roof is tiled. There are two storeys and attics, and the windows are casements, those in the new part with segmental heads, and in the centre bay of the hall range is a full gabled dormer.	II
2 and 3 Leighton Road; 52.64074°N 2.54838°W	—	Late 16th or early 17th century (probable)	A house with later additions and alterations, and divided into two dwellings. It is timber framed with red brick infill and red brick cladding, on a chamfered limestone plinth, rendered on the front, with a tile roof. There are two storeys, a central gabled porch, and casement windows.	II
Brook Cottage; 52.63903°N 2.53861°W	—	Mid 17th century	The cottage was extended in the early 19th century. The original part is timber framed with brick infill, the extension is in stone and brick, and the roof is tiled. There is one storey and attics, the original part having two bays. The windows are casements, and there is a 20th-century gabled eaves dormer.	II
Old School House and Rose Cottage; 52.63878°N 2.53659°W	—	17th century (probable)	Originally a timber framed house consisting of a hall range and a cross-wing to the left, it was extended to the right in the early 19th century, and has been divided into two dwellings. The cross-wing has brick infill, and the hall has been encased in brick and stone. There is one storey and attics, and the windows are casements.	II
Park Farmhouse; 52.63276°N 2.54343°W	—	17th century	The farmhouse was extended in the mid-18th century by the addition of a T-shaped range to the right. The building is in red brick with tile roofs and crow-step gables. The original part has one storey and an attic and two bays, and the later part has two storeys and attics. On the front is a gabled porch, and both parts have casement windows with segmental heads, and gabled dormers.	II
Saplins Cottage; 52.64420°N 2.54372°W	—	Mid 17th century (probable)	The cottage was extended later in the 17th century, and again in the 20th century. The original part is timber framed with plaster and brick infill, the 20th-century extension is in brick, and the roof is tiled. There is one storey and an attic, three bays, and a rear outshut. The windows are casements, and there is a flat-roofed eaves dormer.	II
The Folly; 52.62886°N 2.53524°W	—	Mid 17th century (probable)	A pair of cottages later combined into one dwelling, it is timber framed with brick infill and tile roofs. Each part has one storey and attics, there is an extension to the left of the left part, the left part has been clad in red brick, and the right part is recessed and lower. The windows are casements and each part has two gabled dormers.	II
The Slip; 52.63899°N 2.51445°W	—	17th century	A farmhouse that was considerably altered later. The original two-bay part is timber framed on a brick plinth with brick infill, a range was added at right angles to the rear, in the 19th century a brick range was added at the rear, followed by a larger timber framed range in the late 19th to early 20th century. The roof is tiled, the house has one storey and attics, and the windows are casements. There is a flat-roofed porch with gabled eaves dormers above, and in the latest extension is a five-light canted bay window with a full gabled dormer above.	II
Vine Cottage; 52.64053°N 2.54524°W	—	Mid 17th century (probable)	A timber framed cottage with brick infill, a slate roof, one storey and attics. The original part has two bays, there is a lower extension to the left, and the right gable end has been replaced in red brick. On the front is a French window, the other windows are casements, and there are two gabled dormers.	II
Holy Trinity Church; 52.63937°N 2.53798°W		1720	The church, which contains some earlier material, was restored in 1864. It is in gritstone with a tile roof, and consists of a nave, a south porch, and a chancel with a north vestry. At the west end is a timber framed bellcote with a pyramidal roof and a brass weathercock.	II
Former Stable Block, Buildwas Park; 52.63132°N 2.55342°W	—	c. 1730	The stable block of Buildwas Park House has been converted into a house. It is in red brick with dressings in buff sandstone, rusticated quoins, a moulded eaves cornice, and a hipped tile roof. There are two storeys and a front of nine bays, with a pediment containing a coat of arms above the central projecting three bays. The central doorway has a moulded entablature, and is flanked by blind round-headed arches each with a keystone and imposts. The windows are casements with segmental heads. On the roof is a clock tower with a pyramidal slate roof and a weathervane.	II
Saplins Farmhouse; 52.64822°N 2.54407°W	—	Early to mid-18th century	The farmhouse is in rendered red brick on a stone plinth, with a band and a tile roof. There are two storeys and an attic, a central doorway, and casement windows with segmental heads.	II
Church Farmhouse; 52.64029°N 2.53718°W	—	c. 1730–40	The farmhouse is in brick and has a tile roof with coped gables. It has two storeys and attics, a front of two bays, and three gabled ranges at the rear. There is a porch with a hipped roof, most of the windows are sashes with segmental heads, and there are two mullioned casement windows.	II
Revetment wall, Buildwas Park; 52.63086°N 2.55227°W	—	Mid-18th century	The revetment wall encloses the former garden of Buildwas Park House. It is in red brick with stone coping, and has a maximum height of 2 metres (6 ft 7 in). It is 50 metres (160 ft) in length from southwest to northeast, with 20 metres (66 ft) on the south side and 50 metres (160 ft) on the north side. At the southwest and northeast corners are shallow pilaster buttresses and ball finials.	II
Boden memorial 52.63912°N 2.53802°W	—	c. 1807	The memorial is in the churchyard of Holy Trinity Church, and is to the memory of Daniel Boden, a surgeon. It consists of a rectangular cast iron plate with fluted corner spandrels on a low brown brick plinth.	II
Rigby memorial 52.63927°N 2.53793°W	—	c. 1813	The memorial is in the churchyard of Holy Trinity Church, and is to the memory of Thomas Rigby and another person. It is a chest tomb in limestone, and has a moulded plinth and cap, and square corner pilasters with Gothic tracery and diamond shapes.	II
Mill House Farmhouse; 52.63378°N 2.53208°W	—	Early 19th century	The farmhouse is in red brick with a dentilled eaves eaves cornice and a double-span tile roof. There are two storeys and three bays, a double depth plan, a central doorway, and the windows are sashes.	II
Milestone; 52.63742°N 2.53067°W	—	Early to mid-19th century (probable)	The milestone on the south side of the B4380 road is in limestone. It is rectangular with a rounded top, and has a cast iron plate carrying the distances in miles to Shrewsbury and Ironbridge.	II
