= Llandilo Bridge railway station =

Disused railway station in Ffairfach, Llandeilo, Carmarthenshire

Llandilo Bridge
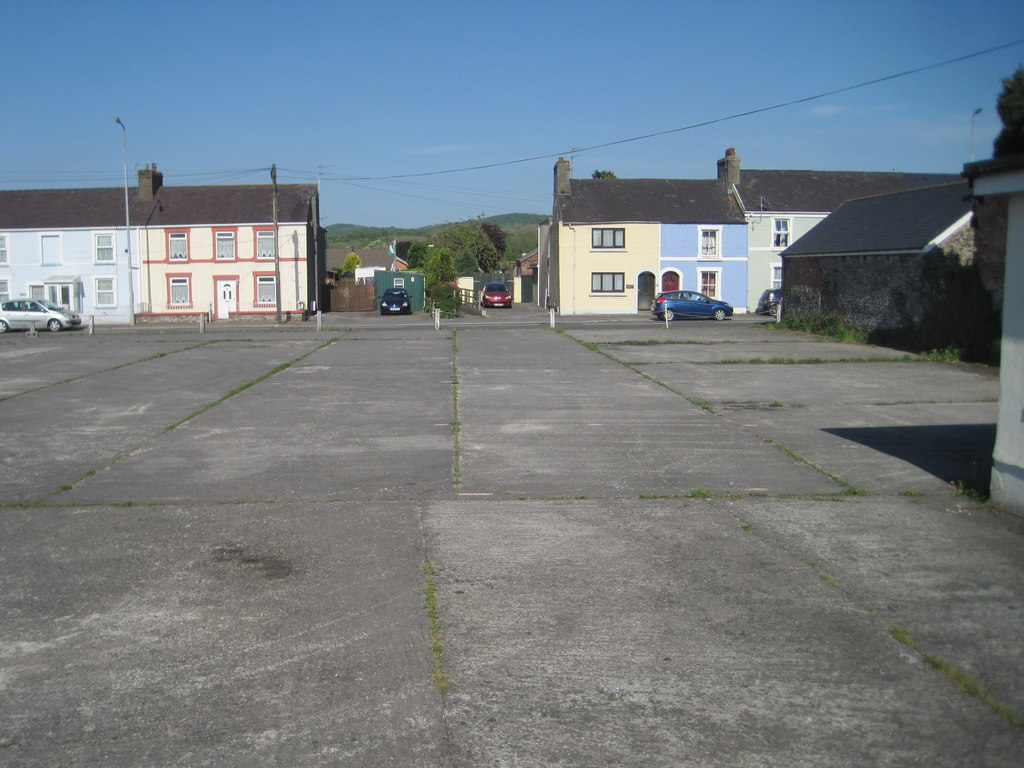
- The site of the station, looking east towards Llandeilo, in 2014

General information
- Location: Llandeilo, Carmarthenshire; Wales
- Coordinates: 51.8757°N 3.9943°W
- Grid reference: SN628215
- Platforms: 1

Other information
- Status: Disused

History
- Original company: Llanelly Railway
- Pre-grouping: London North Western Railway
- Post-grouping: London, Midland and Scottish Railway

Key dates
- 1 June 1865: Opened
- 9 September 1963: Closed
Location

Llandilo Bridge railway station served the town of Llandeilo, in the historical county of Carmarthenshire, Wales, from 1865 to 1963 on the Llanelly Railway.

== History ==
The station was opened on 1 June 1865 by the Llanelly Railway. It was supposed to close on 1 May 1870 but this never materialised, neither did the supposed 1 June closure. It was omitted from Bradshaw in May 1870 and was still absent in June 1871. In the Cambrian timetables, the 1 July 1870 edition showed that the trains stopped at the station but the 8 July edition showed that no trains stopped. The trains were shown stopping again in the 4 August edition. Trains were once again shown as not stopping from 1 April to 1 June 1880. This was due to a dispute with the London North Western Railway. The station closed on 9 September 1963.

Preceding station	Disused railways	Following station
Golden Grove; Line and station closed	Llanelly Railway	Llandeilo; Line closed, station open
