= Albert Edward Bridge =

Railway bridge in Shropshire, England

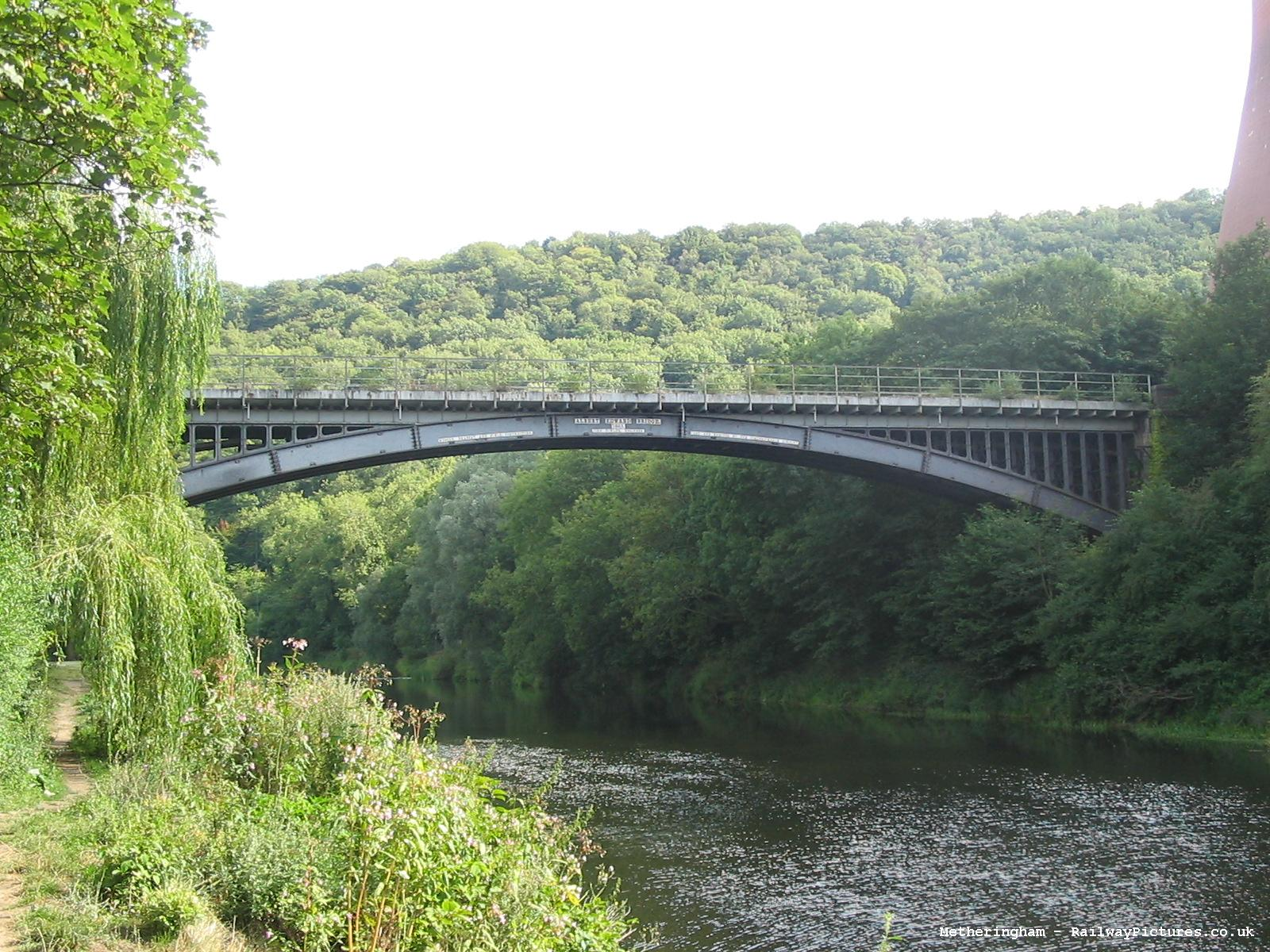
- Coordinates: 52°37′51″N 2°30′11″W
- Carries: Wenlock, Craven Arms and Lightmoor Extension Railway
- Crosses: River Severn
- Locale: Coalbrookdale
- Named for: Edward VII
- Heritage status: Grade II listed building

Characteristics
- Design: arch bridge
- Material: Cast iron
- Longest span: 200 feet (61 m)
- No. of spans: 1

Rail characteristics
- No. of tracks: 2
- Track gauge: 4 ft 8.5 in (1,435 mm)

History
- Designer: John Fowler
- Opened: 1 November 1864

Statistics

Listed Building – Grade II
- Official name: Albert Edward Bridge
- Designated: 24 February 1986; 40 years ago
- Reference no.: 1055277

Location
- Interactive map of Albert Edward Bridge

The Albert Edward Bridge is a railway bridge spanning the River Severn at Coalbrookdale in Shropshire, England.

== History ==
Opened on 1 November 1864 and named after the Prince of Wales (later Edward VII), its design is almost identical to Victoria Bridge which carries the Severn Valley Railway over the Severn between Upper Arley and Bewdley in Worcestershire. Designed by John Fowler, its 200 feet (61 m) span cast iron arch has four ribs, each of nine parts bolted together. The patterns for the radiused beam castings for the bridge were prepared by Thomas Parker at the Coalbrookdale Iron Company. Originally it was built to carry the Wenlock, Craven Arms and Lightmoor Extension Railway of the Wellington and Severn Junction Railway across the river. Until the closure of Ironbridge power station it carried coal traffic as part of the line between Lightmoor Junction and Ironbridge Power Station.

The bridge's timber and wrought iron deck was replaced by a structural steel deck in 1933. It may be one of the last large cast iron railway bridges to have been built. Due to its age and the condition of the ironwork, traffic over the bridge is restricted to a 5 miles per hour (8.0 km/h) speed limit to minimise stress. Although it carries two tracks only the one on the downstream side is still in use.

The bridge is a Grade II listed building, one half by Shropshire Council, the other by Telford and Wrekin District Council as the boundary is mid-span.

Telford Steam Railway have aspirations to run trains over the bridge using the presently unused track as part of their southern extension to Buildwas.

== See also ==
- Crossings of the River Severn

== Bibliography ==
- Cragg, R., Civil Engineering Heritage - Wales & West Central England, Thomas Telford Publishing, 2nd edn., 1997, ISBN 0-7277-2576-9
