= Stretton Westwood =

Hamlet in Shropshire, England

Coordinates: 52.583°N 2.595°W

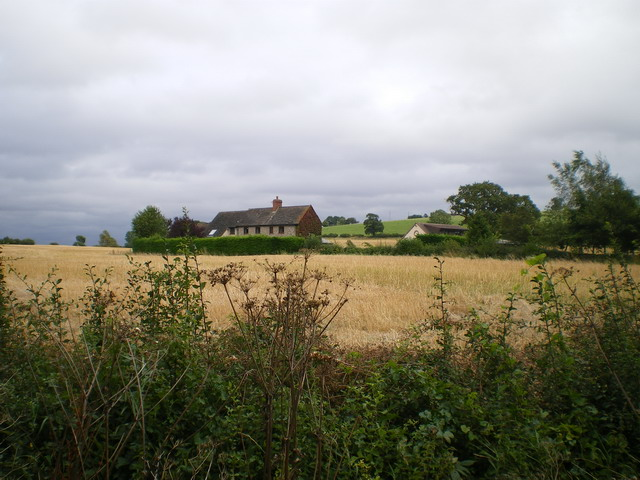
- Lower Farm, Stretton Westwood

- Location within Shropshire
- OS grid reference: SO596985
- Civil parish: Much Wenlock
- Unitary authority: Shropshire
- Ceremonial county: Shropshire
- Region: West Midlands
- Country: England
- Sovereign state: United Kingdom
- Post town: MUCH WENLOCK
- Postcode district: TF13
- Dialling code: 01952
- Police: West Mercia
- Fire: Shropshire
- Ambulance: West Midlands
- UK Parliament: Ludlow

Stretton Westwood is a hamlet in Shropshire, England.

It is located in the parish of Much Wenlock and is two miles southwest of the town, on the B4371 road to Church Stretton; its name derives from it being on the road to Stretton.

It lies near to Wenlock Edge and there are a number of quarries in the vicinity, some of which are operational whilst the rest are now disused.

Westwood is the general name for the area; close by to Stretton Westwood, but on the road to Bourton rather than to Church Stretton, is the smaller hamlet of Bourton Westwood, also in Much Wenlock parish. There was once a Westwood Halt railway station, on the now closed railway line.
