= Harton Road railway station =

Former railway station in Shropshire, England

Harton Road

General information
- Location: Eaton-under-Heywood, Shropshire; England
- Coordinates: 52.4995°N 2.7620°W
- Grid reference: SO483893
- Platforms: 1

Other information
- Status: Disused

History
- Original company: Wenlock, Craven Arms and Lightmoor Extension Railway
- Pre-grouping: Great Western Railway
- Post-grouping: Great Western Railway

Key dates
- 16 December 1867: Opened
- 31 December 1951: Closed
Location

Harton Road railway station was a station in Eaton-under-Heywood, Shropshire, England. The station was opened in 1867 and closed in 1951.

When it originally opened the station was named Harton with the suffix 'Road' added in 1881 There was originally a signal box at the far west end of the platform and this was replaced in 1904 with a ground frame to control the goods loop that could hold seven wagons. Following the closure of the station the ground frame remained in use as the line was used for wagon storage, This was followed in December 1955 by a reduction in the storage length to half a mile

The station was nearly half a mile from Harton. The station is now a private residence.

Preceding station	Disused railways	Following station
Craven Arms and Stokesay; Line closed, station open	Great Western Railway; Wellington to Craven Arms Railway	Rushbury; Line and station closed
