= Much Wenlock railway station =

Former railway station in Shropshire, England

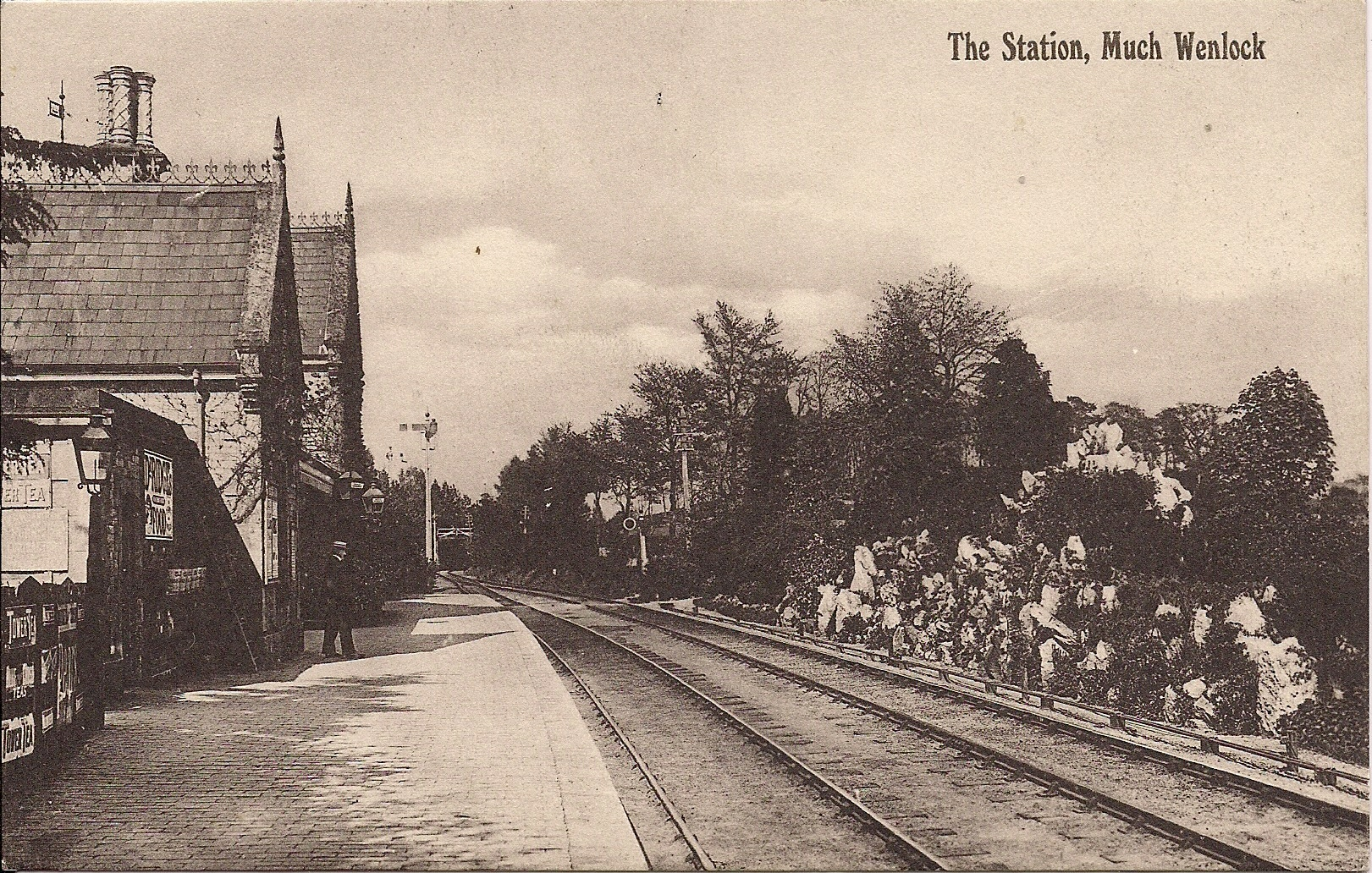
- Postcard stamped 1914

General information
- Location: Much Wenlock, Shropshire; England
- Coordinates: 52.599249°N 2.556918°W
- Grid reference: SJ624003
- Platforms: 1

Other information
- Status: Disused

History
- Original company: Much Wenlock and Severn Junction Railway
- Pre-grouping: Great Western Railway
- Post-grouping: Great Western Railway

Key dates
- 1 February 1862: Opened
- 19 April 1866: resited
- 23 July 1962: Closed
Location

The original Much Wenlock railway station was opened 1 February 1862 by the Much Wenlock and Severn Junction Railway, linking Buildwas with Much Wenlock. The line later formed part of the Wellington to Craven Arms Railway and was, for much of its working life, operated by the Great Western Railway.

The original, but temporary, dead-ended station - whose buildings are now the club house of Much Wenlock Bowling Club. - was replaced by the through station illustrated - about ¼ mile (ca. 400 metres) further east on 19 April 1866 for the extension to Marsh Farm Junction (Craven Arms).

The latter station was built at the gates of the Games Field where the Wenlock Olympian Games were held. The buildings were commented on by Pierre de Coubertin when on his visit to the 1890 games, he likened them to "a delightful cottage".

The passenger service to Craven Arms was withdrawn from 31 December 1951, but the service to Wellington continued until withdrawn from 23 July 1962.

== Present day ==
Today the station building is a private dwelling. The section of former railway line to Buildwas is now a footpath.

Preceding station	Disused railways	Following station
Farley Halt; Line and station closed	Great Western Railway; Wellington to Craven Arms Railway	Westwood Halt; Line and station closed
