= Talley Road Halt railway station =

Disused railway station in Llandeilo, Carmarthenshire

Talley Road Halt
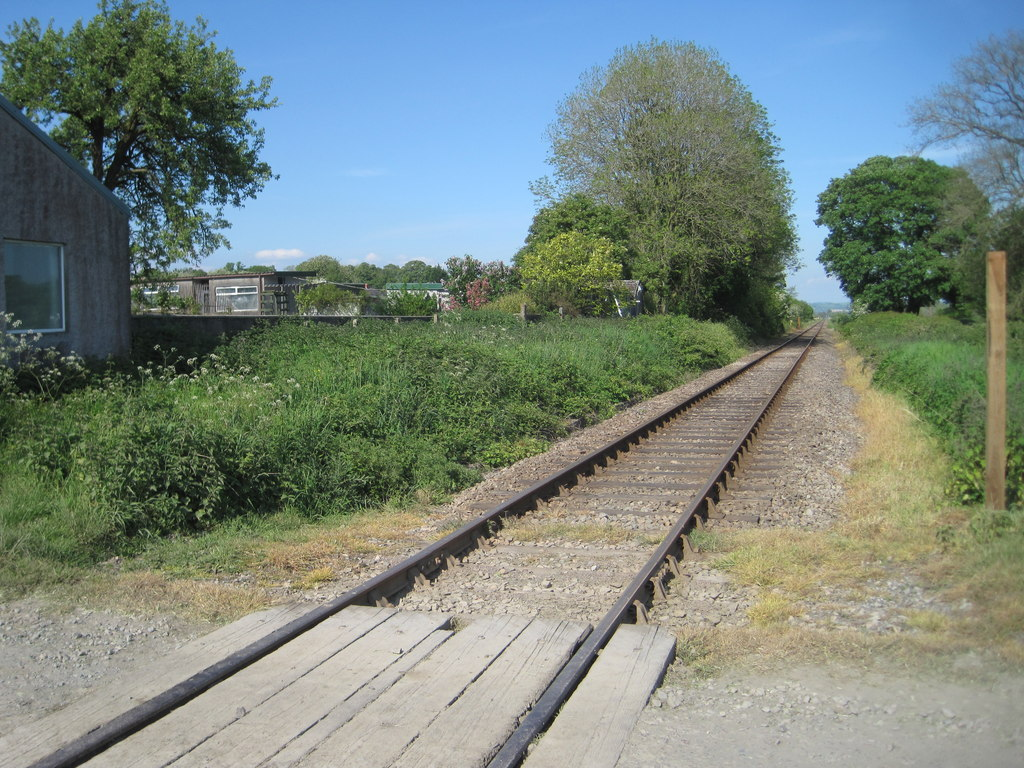
- The site of the station, looking northeast towards Glanrhyd, in 2014

General information
- Location: Llandeilo, [Carmarthenshire] Wales
- Coordinates: 51.9056°N 3.9539°W
- Grid reference: SN656248
- Platforms: 1

Other information
- Status: Disused

History
- Original company: Vale of Towy Railway
- Pre-grouping: Great Western Railway
- Post-grouping: Great Western Railway

Key dates
- September 1859: Opened as Talley Road
- 1941: Name changed to Talley Road Halt
- 4 April 1955: Closed
Location

Talley Road Halt railway station served the town of Llandeilo, in the historical county of Glamorganshire, Wales, from 1859 to 1955 on the Vale of Towy Railway.

== History ==
The station was opened as Talley Road in September 1859 by the Vale of Towy Railway. Its name was changed to Talley Road Halt in 1941 but this change only occurred in the handbook of stations in 1944. The station closed on 4 April 1955 but it was still open as Talley Road Siding in the 1960s.

Preceding station	Disused railways	Following station
Glanrhyd Halt; Line and station closed	Vale of Towy Railway	Terminus
Glanrhyd Halt; Line open, station closed	Vale of Towy Railway; Llanelly Railway and Dock Company	Llandeilo; Line open, station closed
