= Longville railway station =

Former railway station in Shropshire, England

Longville
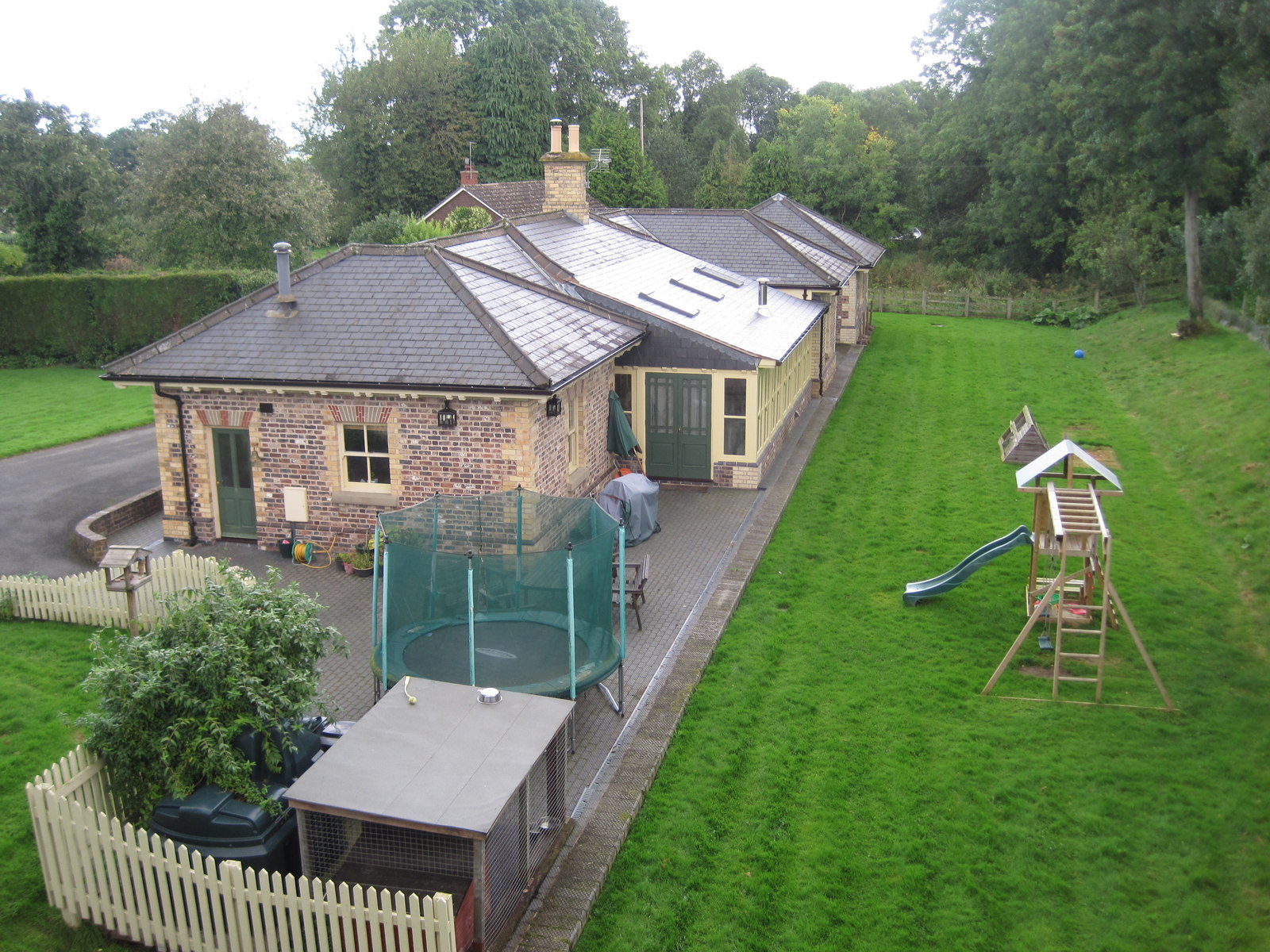
- The site of the station in 2012

General information
- Location: Longville in the Dale, Shropshire; England
- Coordinates: 52.5394°N 2.6750°W
- Grid reference: SO543937
- Platforms: 1

Other information
- Status: Disused

History
- Original company: Wenlock, Craven Arms and Lightmoor Extension Railway
- Pre-grouping: Great Western Railway
- Post-grouping: Great Western Railway

Key dates
- 1867: Opened
- 31 December 1951: Closed for passengers
- 1963: closed for goods
Location

Longville railway station was a station in Longville in the Dale, Shropshire, England. The station was opened in 1867 and closed in 1951. The station is now in use as a private residence.

Preceding station	Disused railways	Following station
Rushbury; Line and station closed	Great Western Railway; Wellington to Craven Arms Railway	Easthope Halt; Line and station closed
