= Llanwrda railway station =

Railway station in Carmarthenshire, Wales

Llanwrda
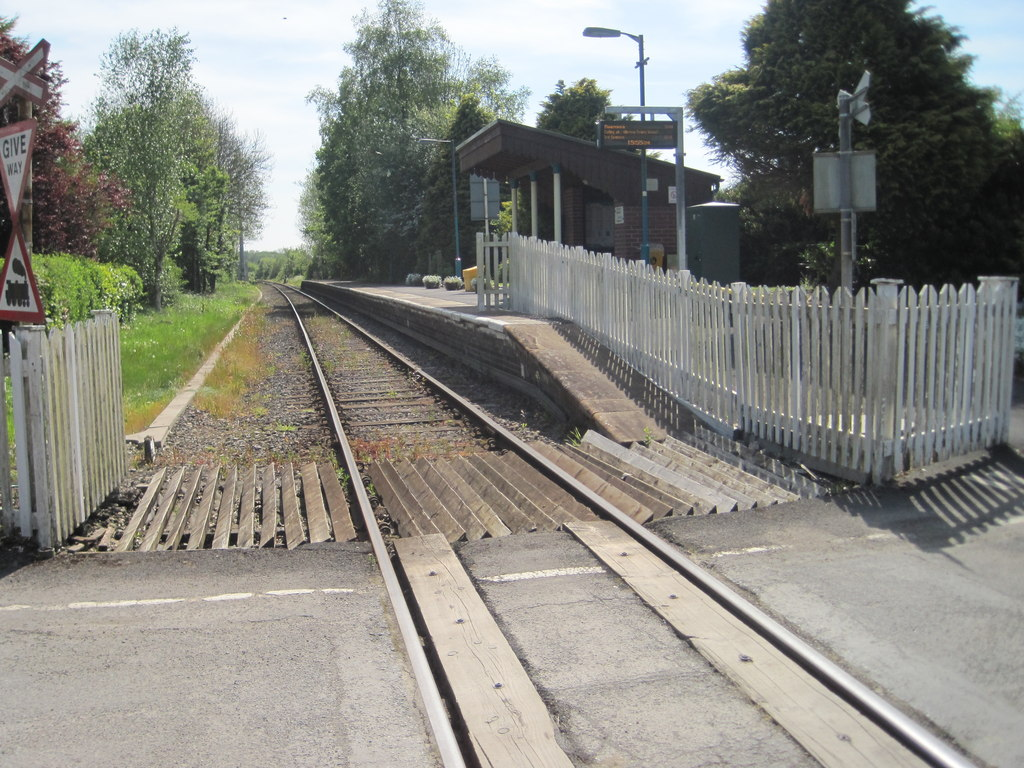

General information
- Location: Llanwrda, Carmarthenshire; Wales
- Coordinates: 51.963°N 3.872°W
- Grid reference: SN714310
- Manager: Transport for Wales
- Platforms: 1

Other information
- Station code: LNR
- Classification: DfT category F2

History
- Opened: 1858

Passengers
- 2021/22: ▲554
- 2022/23: ▲936
- 2023/24: ▲1,162
- 2024/25: ▲1,186
- 2025/26: ▼938
Location
Notes
- Passenger statistics from the Office of Rail and Road

Llanwrda railway station serves the village of Llanwrda near Llandovery, Carmarthenshire. Opened by the Vale of Towy Railway in 1858, the station is on the Heart of Wales Line 38 1/4 miles (61.6 km) north east of Swansea. The station is located below street level at the end of a lane opposite the A40 that leads to the centre of the village (just under 1/2 mile (0.80 km) away on the other side of the A40).

All trains serving the station are operated by Transport for Wales.

== Facilities ==
Like many of its neighbours, the station has only one active platform, no surviving permanent buildings and is located adjacent to an open level crossing. All northbound services are timetabled to stop here, however southbound services only call if requested to do so for unknown reasons. The station also has the usual collection of amenities common to others on this part of the line (waiting shelter, CIS display, timetable poster board and customer help point) as well as a payphone. Level access is available between the main entrance and platform.

== Services ==
From Monday to Saturday, there are five trains a day to Shrewsbury northbound (plus an 06:30 to Llandovery only), six southbound to Swansea. On Saturdays, the first train in each direction does not run. On Sundays, there are two trains northbound to Shrewsbury and two trains southbound to Swansea.

Preceding station	National Rail	Following station
Llangadog	Transport for Wales; Heart of Wales Line	Llandovery
