= Nantgaredig railway station =

Disused railway station in Nantgaredig, Carmarthenshire

Nantgaredig
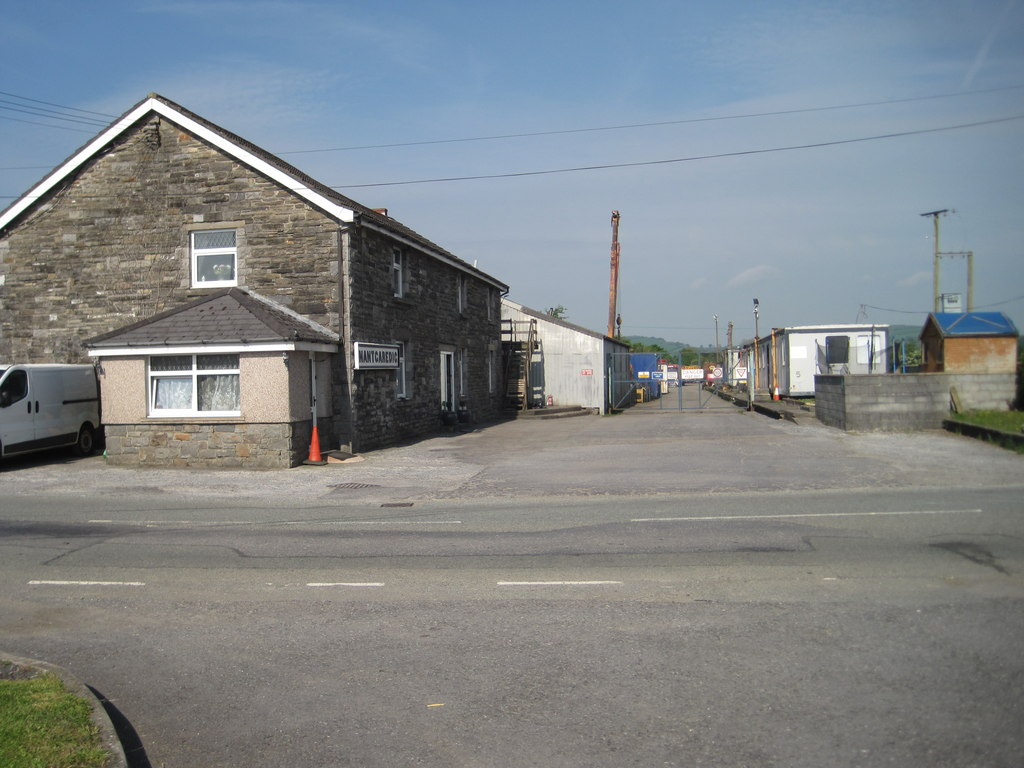
- The site of the station, looking west towards Abergwili, in 2014

General information
- Location: Nantgaredig, Carmarthenshire; Wales
- Coordinates: 51.8656°N 4.1894°W
- Grid reference: SN493208
- Platforms: 2

Other information
- Status: Disused

History
- Original company: Llanelly Railway
- Pre-grouping: London and North Western Railway
- Post-grouping: London, Midland and Scottish Railway

Key dates
- 1 June 1865: Opened
- 9 September 1963: Closed
Location

Nantgaredig railway station served to village of Nantgaredig, Carmarthenshire, Wales from 1865 to 1963 on the Llanelly Railway.

== History ==
The station opened on 1 June 1865 by the Llanelly Railway. The station closed to both passengers and goods traffic on 9 September 1963. The site is now a private residence.

Preceding station	Disused railways	Following station
Whitemill; Line and station closed	Llanelly Railway	Llanarthney Halt; Line and station closed
