= Llanarthney Halt railway station =

Disused railway station in Llanarthney, Carmarthenshire

Llanarthney
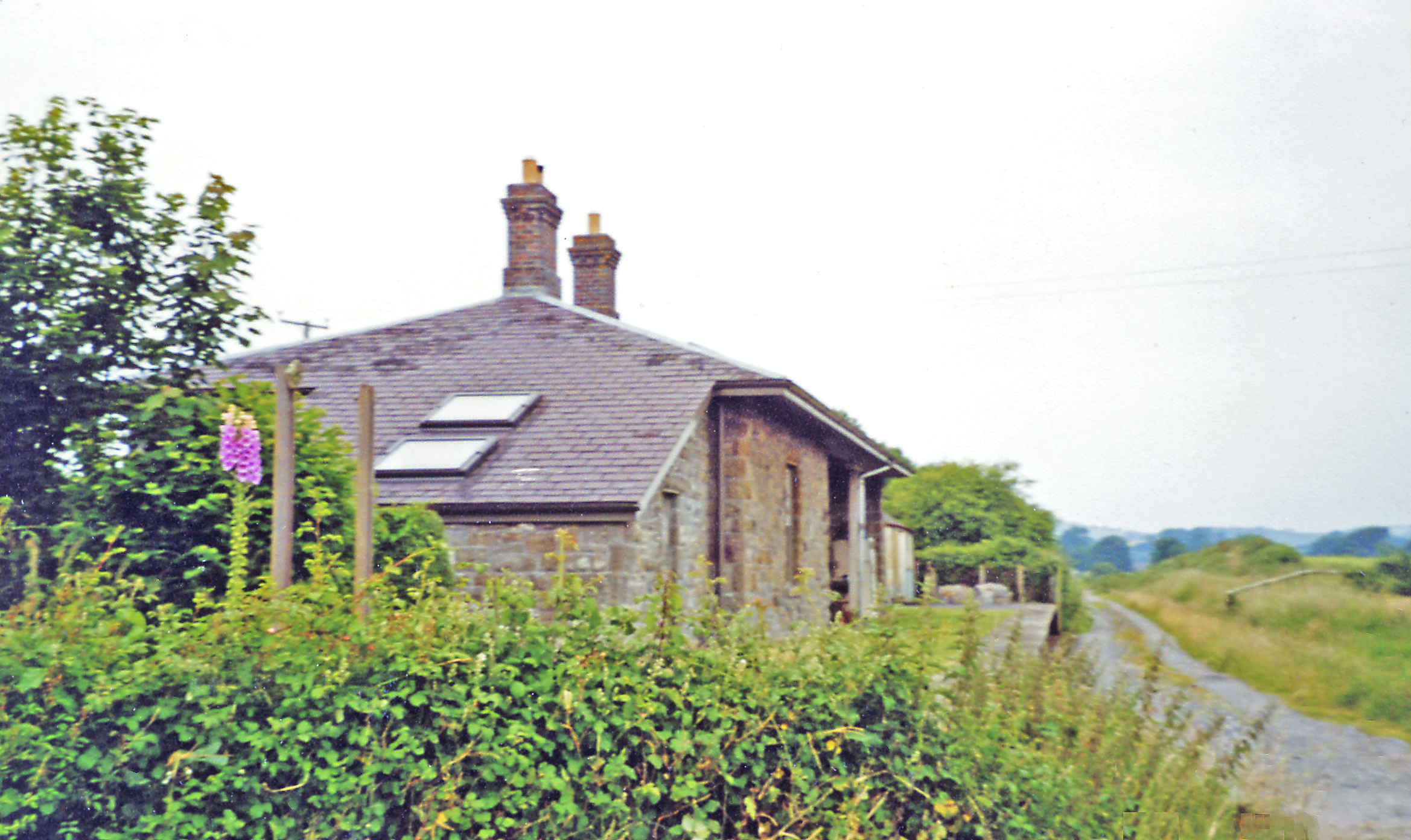
- The site of the station, looking west towards Carmarthen, in 2003

General information
- Location: Llanarthney, Carmarthenshire; Wales
- Coordinates: 51.8637°N 4.1319°W
- Grid reference: SN533205
- Platforms: 1

Other information
- Status: Disused

History
- Original company: Llanelly Railway
- Pre-grouping: London and North Western Railway
- Post-grouping: London and North Western Railway

Key dates
- 1 June 1865: Opened as Llanarthney
- 1954: Name changed to Llanarthney Halt
- 9 September 1963: Closed
Location

Llanarthney railway station served the village of Llanarthney, in the historical county of Carmarthenshire, Wales, from 1865 to 1963 on the Llanelly Railway.

== History ==
The station was opened as Llanarthney on 1 June 1865 by the Llanelly Railway. It was downgraded to a request stop on 1 April 1880 due to a dispute with London North Western Railway but the normal service resumed in June of the same year. The suffix 'halt' was added to its name in 1954. The station closed on 9 September 1963. The site is now a private residence.

Preceding station	Disused railways	Following station
Nantgaredig; Line and station closed	Llanelly Railway	Dryslwyn; Line and station closed
