= Llangadog railway station =

Railway station in Carmarthenshire, Wales

Llangadog
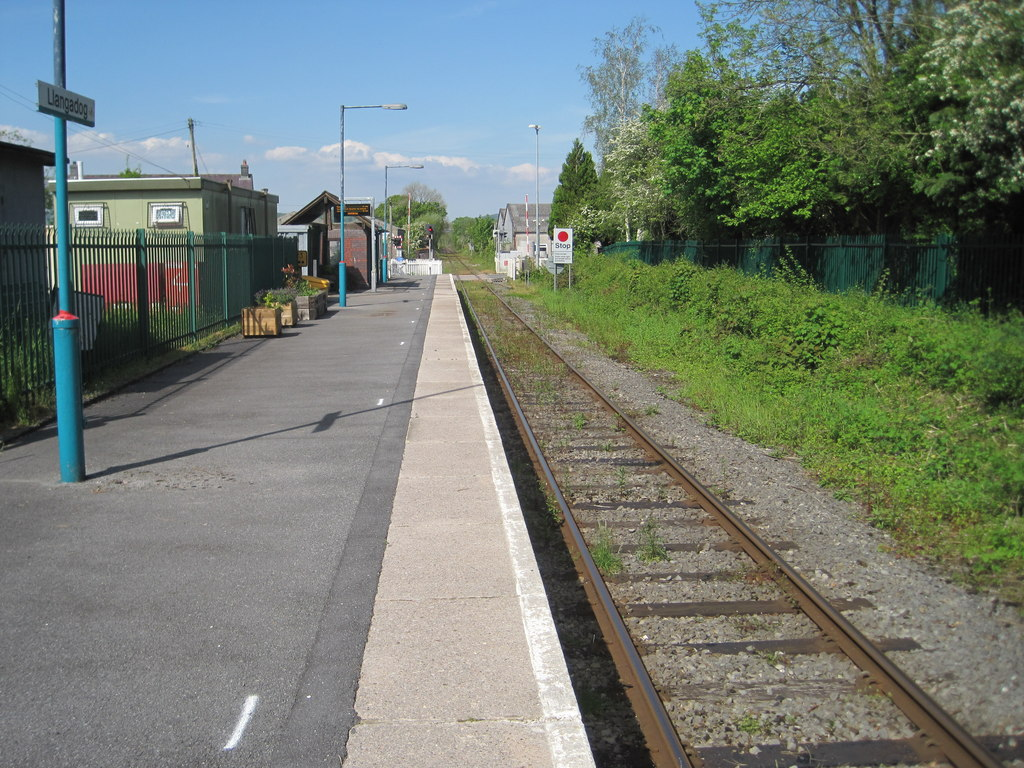

General information
- Location: Llangadog, Carmarthenshire; Wales
- Coordinates: 51.940°N 3.893°W
- Grid reference: SN699285
- Manager: Transport for Wales
- Platforms: 1

Other information
- Station code: LLG
- Classification: DfT category F2

History
- Opened: 1858

Passengers
- 2021/22: ▲2,290
- 2022/23: ▲3,614
- 2023/24: ▼3,364
- 2024/25: ▲4,016
- 2025/26: ▲4,182
Location
Notes
- Passenger statistics from the Office of Rail and Road

Llangadog railway station serves the village of Llangadog near Llandeilo, Carmarthenshire. The station is on the Heart of Wales Line 36 1/2 miles (59 km) north east of Swansea. The station is located at street level at Station Road beside the River Brân. The Garn Goch Iron Age hill fort is about three miles away from this station.

All trains serving the station are operated by Transport for Wales. Like several others on the line, it has an automated half barrier level crossing at one end (in this case the northern one). The barrier sequence for northbound trains has to be initiated by the train crew, so the booked stop here for these is a mandatory one. Southbound trains trigger the crossing using a treadle on approach, so only have to stop here on request.

== History ==
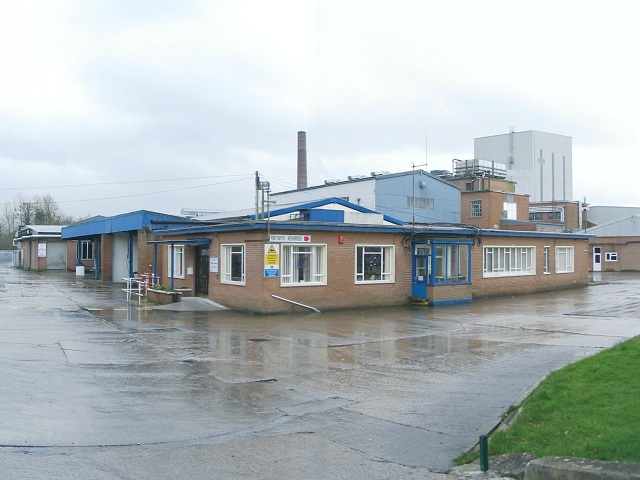
Former CWS/MMB creamery at Llangadog, now a pet food factory

The station was opened by the Vale of Towy Railway in 1858 and once had a siding accessing the Co-op Wholesale Society creamery, allowing milk trains to access the site. After rail access ceased in the late 1970s, the creamery continued to operate until 2005, when it closed with the loss of 200 jobs. The site is now occupied by a pet food factory.

There was also a passing loop and second platform here until the mid-1960s, with a substantial main building on the northbound platform, but these (and the large GWR signal box) have been demolished and removed. The site of the southbound platform is now heavily overgrown.

== Facilities ==
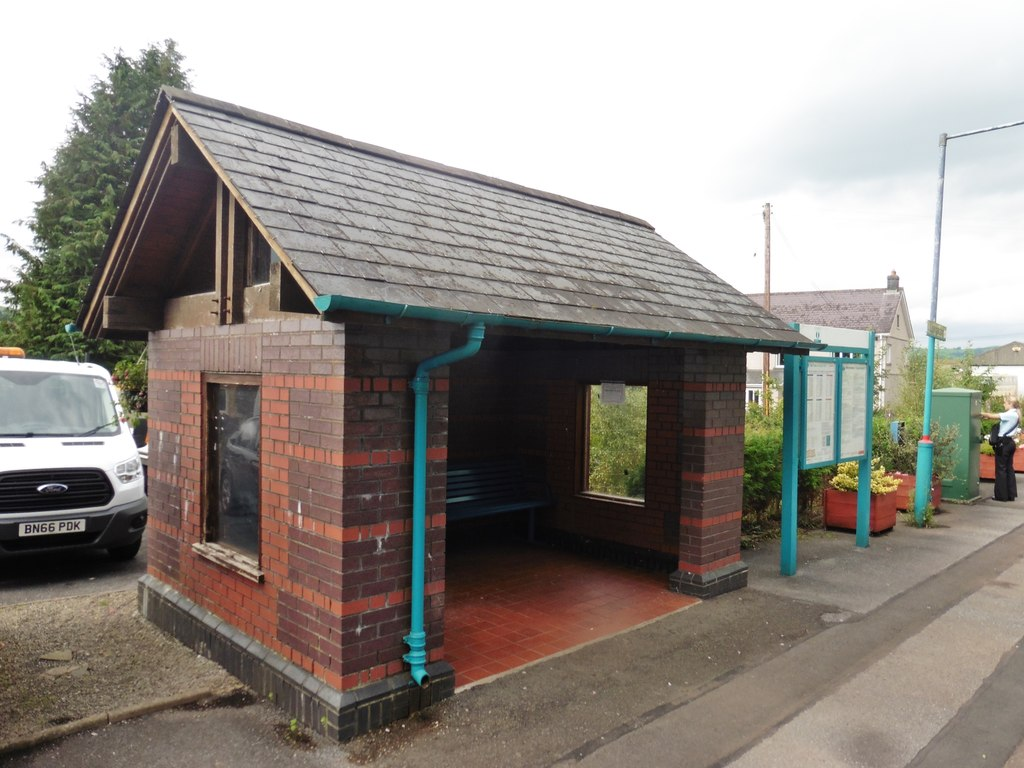
The waiting shelter at Llangadog (2017)

The station has only a single active platform, which is provided with a brick, glass and timber waiting shelter, timetable poster board, CIS display and customer help point (like others along the line). The station is also fitted with a payphone. Level access is available from the car park and main entrance to the platform.

== Services ==
There are five trains a day northbound to Shrewsbury from Monday to Saturday (plus one more to Llandovery) and six southbound to Llanelli and Swansea (the first train in each direction does not run on Saturdays); two trains each way call on Sundays.

Preceding station	National Rail	Following station
Llandeilo	Transport for Wales; Heart of Wales Line	Llanwrda
