= Westwood Halt railway station =

Former railway station in Shropshire, England

Westwood Halt

General information
- Location: Stretton Westwood, Shropshire; England
- Coordinates: 52.5843°N 2.5871°W
- Grid reference: SO603986
- Platforms: 1

Other information
- Status: Disused

History
- Post-grouping: Great Western Railway

Key dates
- 7 December 1935: Opened
- 31 December 1951: Closed
Location

Westwood Halt railway station was a station in Stretton Westwood, Shropshire, England. The station was opened on 7 December 1935 and closed to passengers in 1951.

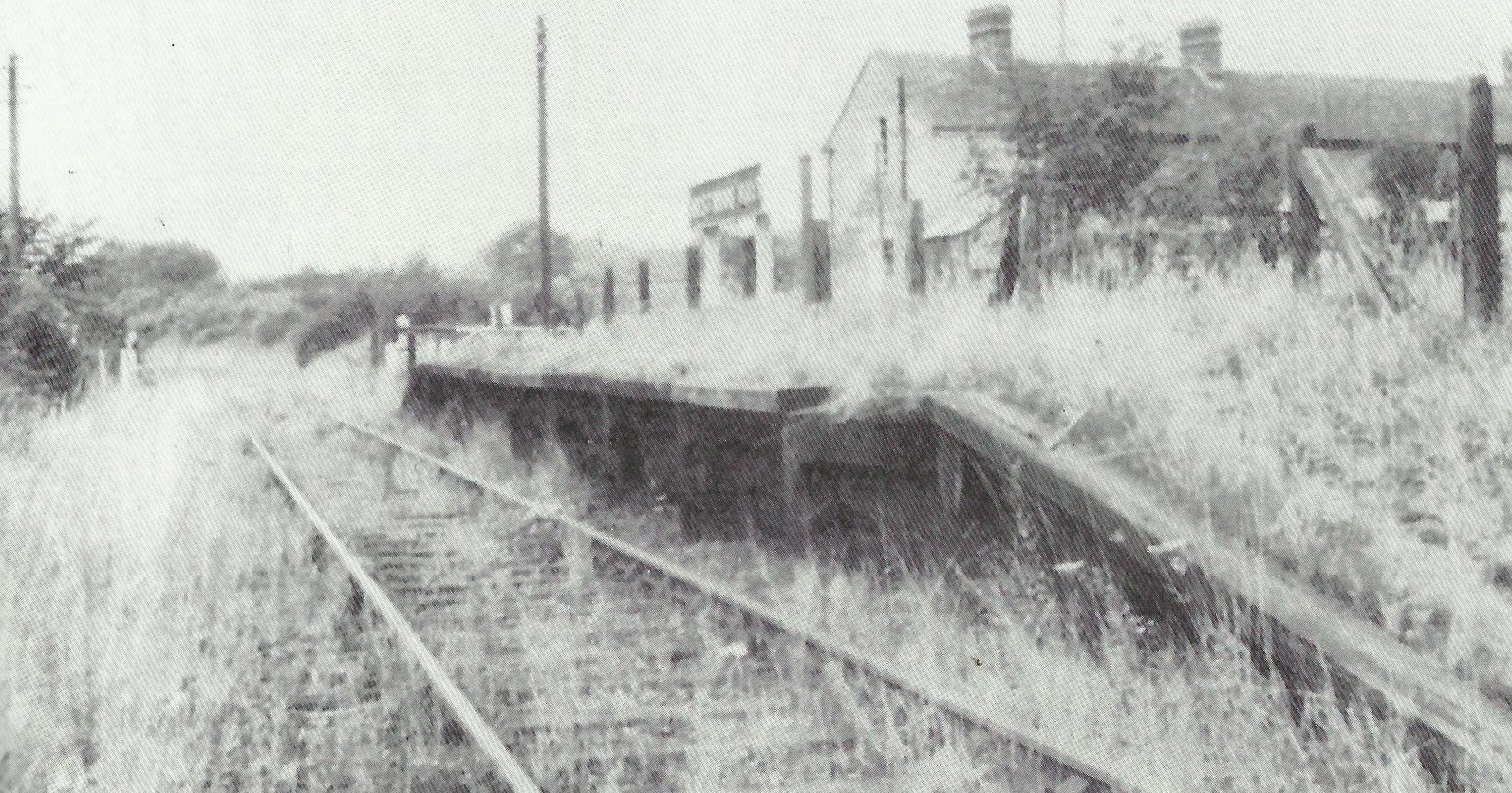
Westwood Halt station circa 1960

Preceding station	Disused railways	Following station
Presthope; Line and station closed	Great Western Railway; Wellington to Craven Arms Railway	Much Wenlock; Line and station closed
