= Easthope Halt railway station =

Former railway station in Shropshire, England

Easthope Halt

General information
- Location: Easthope, Shropshire; England
- Coordinates: 52.5587°N 2.6469°W
- Grid reference: SO562958
- Platforms: 1

Other information
- Status: Disused

History
- Post-grouping: Great Western Railway

Key dates
- 4 April 1936: Opened
- 31 December 1951: Closed
Location

Easthope Halt railway station was a station in Easthope Wood on Wenlock Edge, Easthope, Shropshire, England. The station was opened in 1936 and closed in 1951.

Preceding station	Disused railways	Following station
Longville; Line and station closed	Great Western Railway; Wellington to Craven Arms Railway	Presthope; Line and station closed
