= Marsh Farm Junction =

Coordinates: 52.4875°N 2.8179°W

Marsh Farm Junction was a railway junction in Shropshire where the GWR's line from Buildwas via Much Wenlock joined the LNWR/GWR joint line between Shrewsbury and Hereford. Opened by the Wenlock, Craven Arms and Lightmoor Extension railway in 1867, the Buildwas branch line was subsequently taken over by the GWR and became part of the Wellington to Craven Arms Railway.

Passenger trains ceased on the Wenlock branch in 1951 and it closed completely a few years later. The main Welsh Marches Line remains open and is a busy passenger and freight route.
