= Presthope railway station =

Former railway station in Shropshire, England

Presthope

General information
- Location: East of Hughley, Shropshire; England
- Coordinates: 52.5748°N 2.6107°W
- Grid reference: SO587976

Other information
- Status: Disused

History
- Original company: Wenlock, Craven Arms and Lightmoor Extension Railway
- Pre-grouping: Great Western Railway
- Post-grouping: Great Western Railway

Key dates
- 16 December 1867: Opened
- 31 December 1951: Closed
Location

Presthope railway station was a station to the east of Hughley, Shropshire, England, off the B4371 road. The station was opened in 1867 and closed in 1951.

The site is now occupied by Presthope Grange, a residential mobile home park.

Preceding station	Disused railways	Following station
Easthope Halt; Line and station closed	Great Western Railway; Wellington to Craven Arms Railway	Westwood Halt; Line and station closed
