= Farley Halt railway station =

Former railway station in Shropshire, England

Farley Halt

General information
- Location: North of Much Wenlock, Shropshire; England
- Coordinates: 52.6133°N 2.5441°W
- Grid reference: SJ632018
- Platforms: 1

Other information
- Status: Disused

History
- Post-grouping: Great Western Railway

Key dates
- 24 October 1934: Opened
- 23 July 1962: Closed
Location

Farley Halt railway station was a station in Farley to the north of Much Wenlock, Shropshire, England. The station was opened in 1934 and closed in 1962. It had a short timber edged platform with a wooden shelter on the west side of the line behind the former Rock House Inn. The halt could be accessed by steps down from a road over bridge to the south. On the other side of the over bridge was an access siding to Bradley Rock Quarry. The halt has been demolished, but its nameboard can be found displayed 400 metres to the north of the site on a stone barn adjacent to the A4169 Much Wenlock Road.

Preceding station	Disused railways	Following station
Buildwas; Line and station closed	Great Western Railway; Wellington to Craven Arms Railway	Much Wenlock; Line and station closed
