= Vale of Towy Railway =

Rail line in Carmarthenshire, Wales

Vale of Towy Railway Act 1854
- Act of Parliament
- Parliament of the United Kingdom
- Long title: An Act for making a Railway from the Town of Llandovery in the County of Carmarthen to join the Llanelly Railway at Llandilofawr in the same County, and for other Purposes.
- Citation: 17 & 18 Vict. c. cl

Dates
- Royal assent: 10 July 1854

Text of statute as originally enacted

The Vale of Towy Railway (VoTR) was a Welsh railway that provided an 11.25 mile-long extension of the Llanelly Railway from Llandeilo to Llandovery. It was incorporated by an act of Parliament, the Vale of Towy Railway Act 1854 (17 & 18 Vict. c. cl), of 10 July 1854 and opened on 1 April 1858.

The Vale of Towy Railway (Leasing) Act 1858 (21 & 22 Vict. c. cxlvii) came into force on 2 August 1858 and authorised the Llanelly Railway and Dock Company (LR&DC) to lease the Vale of Towy line. The lease was for an initial ten years with an option later to extend it. In fact the LR&DC became alarmed that other railway companies were taking an interest in the Vale of Towy, and they included conversion of the lease term to perpetuity in the Llanelly Railway and Dock Act 1860 (23 & 24 Vict. c. clxi), which they obtained on 23 July 1860.

Vale of Towy Railway (Leasing) Act 1868
- Act of Parliament
- Parliament of the United Kingdom
- Long title: An Act to enable the Knighton, the Central Wales, and the Central Wales Extension Railway Companies to take a Lease of the Vale of Towy Railway jointly with the Llanelly Railway and Dock Company; and for other Purposes.
- Citation: 31 & 32 Vict. c. xxxvii

Dates
- Royal assent: 25 June 1868

Text of statute as originally enacted

The act authorised but did not compel the conversion of the lease term, and negotiations between the two companies were tense and protracted, and in July 1865 Vale of Towy shareholders rejected a draft lease that had been negotiated. Already in November 1863 the Central Wales Extension Railway had approached the Vale of Towy about a lease; this line was to connect from the north. A lease was authorised by the Vale of Towy Railway (Leasing) Act 1868 (31 & 32 Vict. c. xxxvii).

== Overview ==
The VoTR was a standard gauge route that provided an alternative to the Great Western Railway and Llandovery became a potential endpoint for other rail companies in North Wales and the West of England.

== Stations ==
Intermediate stations were built at (from north to south) Llanwrda, Llangadog, Glanrhyd Halt (closed) and Talley Road Halt (closed).

== The route today ==
The route remains in use as part of the Heart of Wales Line.
