= Buildwas =

Village in Shropshire, England

Coordinates: 52.637°N 2.531°W

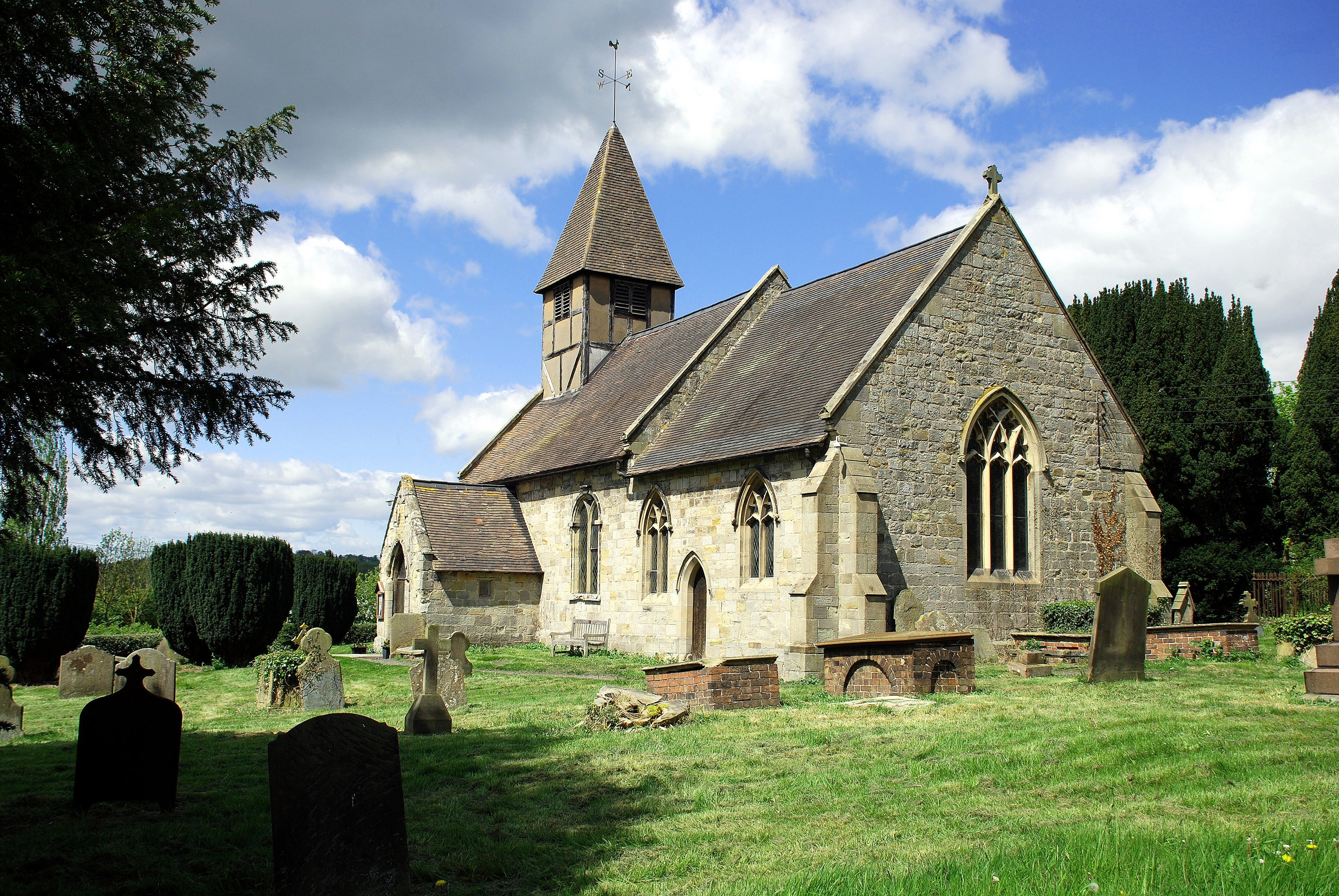
- Buildwas Church

- Location within Shropshire
- Population: 321 (2011)
- OS grid reference: SJ641045
- Civil parish: Buildwas
- Unitary authority: Shropshire
- Ceremonial county: Shropshire
- Region: West Midlands
- Country: England
- Sovereign state: United Kingdom
- Post town: Telford
- Postcode district: TF8
- Dialling code: 01952
- Police: West Mercia
- Fire: Shropshire
- Ambulance: West Midlands
- UK Parliament: Shrewsbury and Atcham

Buildwas is a village and civil parish in Shropshire, England, on the north bank of the River Severn at grid reference SJ641045. It lies on the B4380 road between Atcham and Ironbridge. The Royal Mail postcodes begin TF6 and TF8.

Buildwas Primary Academy is situated on the Buildwas bank road. The school has been running since 1855, and has three classes and a nursery.

Buildwas previously had a nine-hole golf course which ran between the River Severn and the site of Ironbridge Power Station. It was open to members of Buildwas Abbey Club.

== Village ==
The village of Buildwas has been recognised since 1086 as the first reference to it was made in the Domesday Book. Buildwas was valued at 45 shillings (£2.25) to the Bishop of Chester, i.e. the Bishop of Lichfield and Coventry, the local diocesan bishop, in 1086. The value of the manor was the same as in 1066, although it had slipped in the interim period. Its value lay in its location on the River Severn in its woodland, which was useful for agricultural and farming purposes. During this time period, the village had a total population of nine households, three of villeins, five of slaves and one the reeve. Due to this the village only had a total tax assessment of one geld unit which was very small. Buildwas had resources of 200 pigs and a mill which people relied on. The manor was assigned to Buildwas Abbey, originally founded as a Savigniac monastery, in 1135 by Roger de Clinton (1129–1148), Bishop of Coventry and Lichfield. The Savigniac houses were later absorbed into the Cistercian order. After the abbey was suppressed in 1536, as part of the Dissolution of the Monasteries, the site and much of the property was granted to Edward Grey, 3rd Baron Grey of Powis

Buildwas was also the site of a station opened in 1862 on the Wellington to Craven Arms Railway and Severn Valley Railway, although the station was inaccessible to the population and visitors who had to get off further down the line at either Ironbridge or Coalbrookdale. The site was, until recently, occupied by Ironbridge Power Station. However, the station was demolished in stages completed in 2021. with hopes a new railway station to serve Ironbridge Gorge area could be opened near Buildwas.

Based on a study of train journeys and travel times, Michael Cobb argued in 1977 that Buildwas could have been a location setting for the fictional Market Blandings in the writings of P.G. Wodehouse, and the mansion Buildwas Park an original for Blandings Castle.

=== Occupations ===
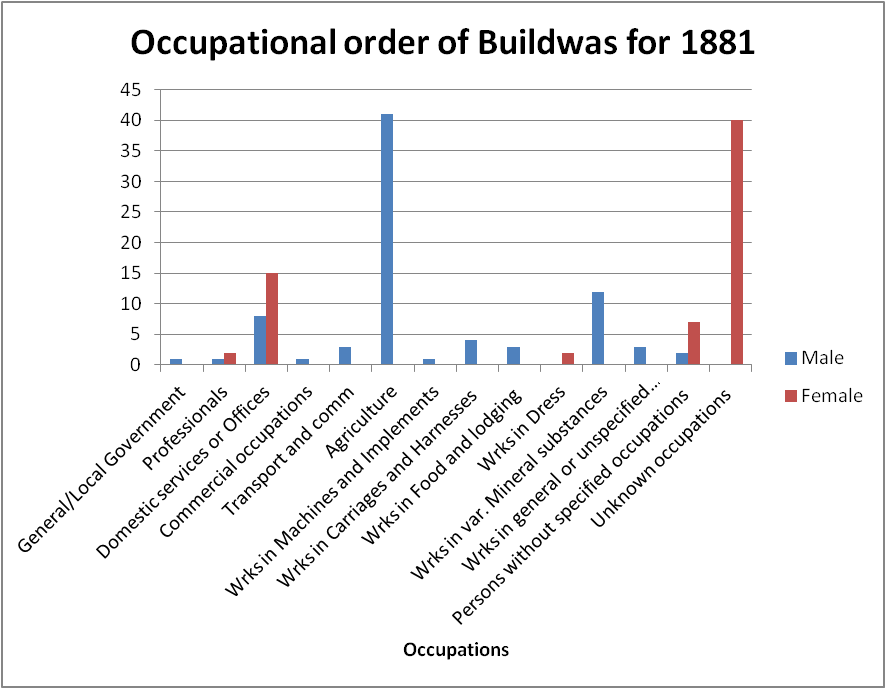
Occupational order of Buildwas for 1881

The first census regarding occupational data for the village of Buildwas was taken in 1831 and gives a valuable insight into the village for this time period. The census showed that the biggest employability sector at this time was agricultural labourers, and there were 35 people employed in this field. The second-biggest field was retail and handicrafts, which employed seven people in the village. There was one capitalist or professional person within the village, and the remaining people were farmers and servants.

The 1881 census of the village gave valuable insight into how the population had slowly increased and how the jobs had diversified. Agriculture was still the biggest employment sector with 41 people, but other job fields had grown over the course of fifty years. There were fifteen females and eight males employed in domestic services and offices. There were twelve males employed in the extraction of mineral substances and three people who worked in transport and commerce. There were forty people in the survey who were classified as having an unknown occupation and three male workers in food and lodging.

== Population ==
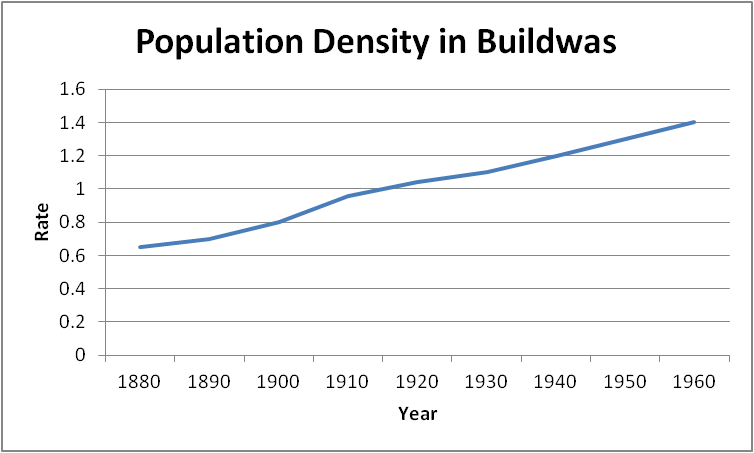
Population density of Buildwas from 1880 to 1960

Population change in Buildwas has experienced a great deal of fluctuation since the first census of 1801 was taken. This is because the village had a small population of 258 to begin with, meaning that any change is a lot more visible. In 1811 the population had declined to 226 people but then experienced a gradual increase to 240 people in 1821 and stayed at this level through to 1831. Over the next ten years, the village had experienced a rapid population increase of 33 people in 1841 and in 1851 the population had increased again to 290 people. From 1851 to 1881 there had been a population decrease of eighteen people. During 1881 there was a national population change across the country with an overall decrease of 3% and this change of population was apparent in Buildwas as from 1881 to 1891 there was a population decrease of 31 people. The population increased by 34 people in 1901 and by 1911 the population had increased by 32 people.

== Housing ==
According to the 2001 Census, Buildwas had a total of 134 dwellings. Of these, 42 were categorised as being flats or apartments, 46 detached houses or bungalows, and 46 semi-detached or terraced houses. The average price of property which has been sold in Buildwas was valued at £218,114 which was well above the national average of £161,558 in April 2012.

In June 2018 the Harworth Group announced that it had bought the Ironbridge Power Station site, whose buildings were scheduled for demolition, for an undisclosed sum. Plans for the site included the development of 'several hundred new homes' together with commercial development, leisure uses and significant public open space. An outline planning application for a development including 1,000 new homes and other facilities was submitted to both Shropshire Council and Telford and Wrekin Council on 19 December 2019. The plan was initially rejected by Shropshire Council's Southern Planning Committee in August 2021 over a number of issues including the level of guaranteed affordable housing, but was granted in September 2021 after amended proposals were submitted.

== Abbey ==
The preserved remains of a Cistercian abbey lie on the south bank of the River Severn. These include an unusually unaltered 12th-century church, a vaulted and tile-floored chapter house, and a re-opened crypt chapel. The stone abbey buildings were completed mainly during the abbacy of Ranulf, which began around 1155. The income for the abbey came mainly from a large portfolio of properties, concentrated around monastic granges in the surrounding areas of Shropshire and Staffordshire. The site is now cared for by English Heritage.

== Bridge ==
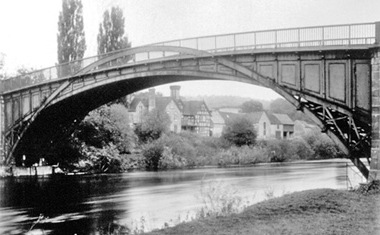
Telford's bridge at Buildwas

A brick and stone bridge crossed the Severn from medieval times to the 18th century; in the floods of 1773 and 1795, it was irreparably damaged and finally swept away by severe flooding following an earthquake. After its destruction, Thomas Telford built a cast-iron arch bridge in 1796, which survived subsequent floods until its replacement by a steel Pratt truss in 1905, which itself was replaced in 1992.

== See also ==
- Listed buildings in Buildwas
- Ironbridge Gorge
- Buildwas Junction railway station
- Telford Steam Railway
