= Llansamlet railway station (MR) =

Disused railway station in Llansamlet, Swansea

Llansamlet

General information
- Location: Llansamlet, Glamorganshire; Wales
- Coordinates: 51.6606°N 3.8894°W
- Grid reference: SS694974

Other information
- Status: Disused

History
- Original company: Midland Railway
- Pre-grouping: Midland Railway

Key dates
- 21 February 1860: Opened
- 1 March 1875: Closed
Location

Llansamlet railway station served the suburb of Llansamlet, in the historical county of Glamorganshire, Wales, from 1860 to 1875 on the Swansea Vale Railway.

== History ==
The station was opened on 21 February 1860 by the Midland Railway. It closed on 1 March 1875.

Preceding station	Disused railways	Following station
Swansea St Thomas; Line and station closed	Midland Railway; Swansea Vale Railway	Glais; Line and station closed
