= 1928 UK & Ireland Greyhound Racing Year =

The 1928 UK & Ireland Greyhound Racing Year was the third year of greyhound racing in the United Kingdom and the second year of greyhound racing in Ireland.

== Roll of honour ==
Major Winners
Award	Name of Winner
1928 English Greyhound Derby	Boher Ash
1928 Irish Greyhound Derby+	Tipperary Hills
1928 Scottish Greyhound Derby	Glinger Bank
1928 Welsh Greyhound Derby	Cheerful Choice

+ unofficial National Derby

== Summary ==
The oval track form of greyhound racing continued to rapidly grow with numerous tracks, either in the process of being constructed or opening. The Greyhound Racing Association (GRA) continued to lead the way, opening or having a financial interest in new tracks opening in Ramsgate, Cardiff, Nottingham, Plymouth, Portsmouth, Brighton and Stoke-on-Trent. The GRA also moved venues in Leeds from Fullerton Park to Elland Road Greyhound Stadium which was literally next door. Other major tracks to open included three London venues; West Ham Stadium with the capacity to accommodate 100,000 spectators, Clapton Stadium designed by the famous architect Sir Owen Williams and Wimbledon Stadium which would become one of the most prominent tracks in the industry. The latter was owned by Bill (W.J) Cearns. Three tracks also opened in Wales; White City Stadium, Cardiff, Glais Stadium and Cardiff Arms Park.

The National Greyhound Racing Club (NGRC) was formed, the purpose of this organisation was to govern greyhound racing and the body would be responsible for regulation and the rules of racing that came into force on 23 April. The NGRC consisted of twelve stewards usually chosen from military or police backgrounds. The first stewards included E.A.V.Stanley, Lt General Sir Edward Bethune and Major B.D.Corbett. The rules of racing were introduced and updated annually and any track wishing to be associated with them were required to agree to the rules and apply for licences. Tracks that were not licensed were called independent or 'Flapping' tracks, the latter description was not welcomed by the independent tracks. Calendars were formulated containing information for all licensed personal and anyone falling foul of the rules was subject to investigation and punishment. A passport or official identity book for every greyhound was introduced and was a vital component to ensure the policing of greyhounds at every track.

The total annual attendance across the country for 1928 increased to 13 million 695,275 from 5,656,686 (in 1927). With the rise in popularity there was also the growth of opposition to greyhound racing. In March a decision by Salford City Council to cease permitting advertisements of greyhound races on the back of tram tickets was passed by a vote of 26 to 14.

== Competitions ==
Six new major events were inaugurated during the year. The Cesarewitch at West Ham and St Leger at Wembley for stayers and the Scurry Gold Cup at Clapton for sprinters were introduced in London. Three national Derby competitions were started - the Scottish Greyhound Derby at Carntyne, the Welsh Derby at Welsh White City (Cardiff) and the Irish Greyhound Derby at Harolds Cross. The Welsh Derby was not considered a classic event at this stage and the Irish Derby was unofficial.

== Mick the Miller ==
The first great champion of greyhound racing emerged when on 18 April, Mick the Miller won on debut at Shelbourne Park but was overshadowed by his brother Macoma five days later. Macoma also trained by Horan broke the world record time for 500 yards beating the existing record holder Kriesler in a time of 28.80 sec. Later in the same month the pair went to Celtic Park to contest the Abercorn Cup and during a gallop Macoma caught his leg in the mesh traps breaking his hock. Mick the Miller finished third in the final but made a name for himself when equaling the world record of 28.80 at Shelbourne, a race sandwiched in between the semi and final at Celtic Park. Then Mick the Miller was struck down with distemper. There were no vaccine available and his chances of survival were slim but Arthur 'Doc' Callanan, who was the manager of Shelbourne Park as well as being a qualified veterinary surgeon on site nursed him back to health. In the August, both Mick the Miller and Macoma were put up for sale by Father Brophy. Macoma was sold for 290 guineas but Mick the Millers reserve was not met, a fortunate moment for his owner Father Brophy.

== Ireland ==
The Irish Derby was unofficial because Harolds Cross decided to run a 'National Derby' without consulting the Irish racing authorities. This was a practice they would continue to do until the formation of classic races in 1932. Also in Ireland it was clear that the 1926 Betting Act passed by the Oireachtas, Dáil Éireann was benefitting the Irish government with funds from the tax it received from gambling. The 5% off course tax and 2.5% on course tax also seemed to be a catalyst for new track builds in Ireland. However a proposed government amendment to tax the unregulated Irish flapping tracks was defeated 66 votes to 48. In Ireland the Harolds Cross Parish Church held sermons called "The Moral Challenge of Greyhound Racing" and the "Religion and the Gambling Spirit".

=== 1928 Unofficial Irish Derby ===
The winner of the 1928 Irish Greyhound Derby was Tipperary Hills. On Thursday 16 August, Tipperary Hills (Billy Quinn), Curristown (John Shannon) and Happy Man won the semi-finals. Tipperary Hills defeated PJ Graham's Battle Island by one length in 30.72 sec, Curristown defeated Gilly Gooly by two lengths in 30.95 sec and the third and final semi final was won by Happy Man (M Hammond) from False Favourite (C Forde) by four lengths in 31.10 sec.

== Tracks opened ==
Date	Stadium/Track	Location	Note/ref
11 January	Monmore Green Stadium	Wolverhampton	
21 January	Staines Greyhound Stadium	Staines-upon-Thames	
17 March	Woodhouse Lane Stadium	Wigan	
31 March	Hanley Greyhound Stadium	Stoke-on-Trent	
7 April	Long Eaton Stadium	Long Eaton	
7 April	Lythalls Lane Stadium	Coventry	
7 April	Perry Barr Stadium	Birmingham	
7 April	Clapton Stadium	London	
7 April	Cardiff Arms Park	Cardiff	
7 April	White City Stadium, Glasgow	Glasgow	
7 April	Albion Greyhound Racecourse	Salford	
7 April	Northampton Greyhound Stadium	Northampton	
10 April	Harold's Cross Stadium	Dublin	
14 April	Askern Greyhound Stadium	Askern	
14 April	Doncaster Greyhound Track	Doncaster	
17 April	South Yorkshire Sports Stadium	Wombwell	
21 April	Albion Greyhound Stadium	Glasgow	
23 April	Firhill Stadium	Glasgow	
5 May	Beacon Park	Plymouth	
12 May	Huish Athletic Ground	Yeovil	
18 May	Tannadice Park	Dundee	
19 May	Cleveland Park Stadium	Middlesbrough	
19 May	Wimbledon Stadium	London	
26 May	Ramsgate Stadium	Ramsgate	
26 May	White City Stadium (Newcastle)	Newcastle upon Tyne	
26 May	Leicester Stadium	Leicester	
26 May	Dolphin Stadium	Slough	
26 May	Field Mill	Mansfield	
28 May	Pennycross Stadium	Plymouth	
28 May	White City Stadium (Manchester)	Manchester	
2 June	Brighton & Hove Greyhound Stadium	Brighton	
9 June	Magnet Racecourse	Bedminster	
16 June	Eastville Stadium	Bristol	
23 June	Brough Park Stadium	Newcastle	
23 June	Victoria Park, Bournemouth	Bournemouth	
27 June	The Show Grounds Greyhound Track	Cork	
30 June	Portsmouth Greyhound Track	Portsmouth	
7 July	Glais Stadium	Swansea	
7 July	Central Park	Cowdenbeath	
21 July	Exeter Greyhound Stadium	Exeter	
28 July	West Ham Stadium	London	
6 August	Banister Court Stadium	Southampton	
6 September	Old Craven Park	Kingston upon Hull	
6 September	Dunmore Stadium	Belfast	
20 October	Vicarage Road	Watford	

== Major Competitions inaugurated ==
- Scottish Greyhound Derby at Carntyne Stadium
- Scurry Gold Cup at Clapton Stadium
- St Leger at Wembley Stadium
- Cesarewitch at West Ham Stadium
- Welsh Derby at White City Stadium (Cardiff)

== Principal UK races ==
Scottish Greyhound Derby, Carntyne (Jun 30, 525y, £200)
Pos	Name of Greyhound	Trainer	Time (sec)	SP	Trap
1st	Glinger Bank	John Snowball	30.39	100-6	2
2nd	Ridiculous		30.40	5-1	1
3rd	Wee Murray		30.44	4-7f	4
u	Loyola			100-6	3
u	Rockall			5-1	5
u	Monart Boy			5-1	6

Grand National, White City (Aug 18, 525y h, £700)
Pos	Name of Greyhound	Trainer	SP	Time	Trap
1st	Cormorant	Sidney Probert	4-1	31.16	1
2nd	Carpio	Jack Chadwick	8-11f	31.19	3
3rd	Douro	Leslie Reynolds	5-2	31.67	4
4th	Danistol	Leslie Reynolds	10-1		2

Oaks, White City (Aug 25, 525y, £700)
Pos	Name of Greyhound	Trainer	SP	Time	Trap
1st	Moselle	Jimmy Quinn	1-2f	30.50	3
2nd	Sweet Bessie	Harry Woolner	6-1	30.54	5
3rd	Burletta	Alf Mulliner	8-1	30.55	4
u	Bandrol	R Wilson	20-1		1
u	Hantapara				2
u	Bella Cutlets	W Smith			6

Scurry Gold Cup, Clapton (Sep 15, 400y, £100)
Pos	Name of Greyhound	Trainer	SP	Time	Trap
1st	Cruiseline Boy	Paddy McEllistrim	4-7f	24.91	5
2nd	Hilman Carr	Private	10-1	24.93	4
3rd	Melksham Dodger	Sid Jennings	3-1	24.95	6
4th	Finland	Renwick	10-1		1
5th	Lahard Boy	Clarke	100-7		3
6th	Grenogue	Godfrey Hyde-Clarke	5-1		2

St Leger, Wembley (Sep 15, 700y, £650)
Pos	Name of Greyhound	Trainer	SP	Time	Trap
1st	Burletta	Alf Mulliner	5-2	41.91	3
2nd	Chain Mail	Jack Kennedy	10-11f	41.99	2
3rd	Toftwood Millsack	Harry Buck	100-6	42.03	5
u	Bachelor	Graham	10-1		1
u	Welcome Windfall	Joe Harmon	6-1		4
u	Record Race	Thomas Cudmore	7-1		6

Welsh Derby, White City (Cardiff) (Oct 13, 525y, £130)
Pos	Name of Greyhound	Trainer	SP	Time	Trap
1st	Cheerful Choice	Paddy Fortune (Welsh White City)	8-11f	30.73	3
2nd	Jolly Roger	William Baldwin (Welsh White City)	8-1	30.97	6
3rd	Glenstal Rover	Albert Carter (Welsh White City)	6-1	31.21	1
u	Berrima	Stan Biss (Wimbledon)	5-1		2
u	Knight of Malta	William Baldwin (Welsh White City)	25-1		4
u	Spittle Rover	Paddy Fortune (Welsh White City)	6-1		5

Cesarewitch, West Ham (Oct 20, 600y, £330)
Pos	Name of Greyhound	Trainer	SP	Time	Trap
1st	Dicks Son	Bill Fear	6-4jf	34.38	6
2nd	Naughty Jack Horner	Jim Syder Sr.	4-1	34.62	1
3rd	Hertford	Thomas Cudmore	6-4jf	35.10	4
u	Record Race	Thomas Cudmore	8-1		2
u	Carberrys Chieftain		100-7		3
u	Money's Worth	Jimmy Lowther	100-7		5

== Principal Irish finals ==
Grand National, Shelbourne (525 H, 14 April)
Pos	Name of Greyhound	SP	Time
1st	The Tanker	4-1	31.
2nd	Rathmullen	10-1	
u	My Regret	4-1	
u	Beaded Shamrock	4-6f	

Easter Cup, Shelbourne (525y, 16 April)
Pos	Name of Greyhound	SP	Time
1st	Odd Blade	1-2f	30.64
2nd	Debonair	7-2	30.66
3rd	Moselle		
u	Doubtful Dick		
u	Emerald Isle		
u	Bluette		

== Key ==
U = unplaced
