= Glais =

Glais: Welsh: Y Glais
- Village
- The village of Glais during winter, as seen from Graig Ola (Glais Mountain).
- Population: 831 (2021 Census)
- Principal area: Swansea
- Preserved county: West Glamorgan
- Country: Wales
- Sovereign state: United Kingdom
- Post town: Swansea
- Police: South Wales
- Fire: Mid and West Wales
- Ambulance: Welsh
- UK Parliament: Swansea East
- Senedd Cymru – Welsh Parliament: Brycheiniog Tawe Nedd

Glais (Welsh: Y Glais) is a semi-rural village in Swansea, South Wales. Nant-y-Pal is a stream running through the middle of Glais. It divides the village into two electoral wards: to the north of the stream, Glais is under the Clydach Electoral Ward; to the south, Glais is under the Llansamlet Electoral Ward. The village is shared between the communities of Clydach and Birchgrove. As of the 2024 general election, Glais is within the Neath and Swansea East UK Parliament constituency and is represented by the Labour MP, Carolyn Harris. The 2021 census estimates the village population to be 831 residents.

The word 'glais' is one of the Welsh words for stream and is a common element in Welsh place-names. Other locations containing the word glais occur as a composite element referring to a single particular name.

== Social, Leisure and Retail ==
=== Glais Community Centre ===
The village community centre, situated in the centre of the village, is host to frequent events such as parties, fetes, assorted clubs, classes, etc. The centre is also bookable for private events. Facilities include a main hall area, kitchen, toilets and an outdoor seating area.

In 2021, the centre underwent a large refurbishment that updated and refreshed the interior facilities and décor.

In 2025, the Committee of Glais Community Centre worked to fund a new outdoor seating area with benches and daffodil planters.

=== Glais Stores Village Shop ===
A Premier local convenience shop is located on the main road. There is a Post Office box outside.

=== The Globe Inn ===
The Globe Inn is the oldest and now only pub in Glais. The pub boasts a bar area alongside a thriving restaurant, with the Sunday Carvery being especially popular alongside its main menu that includes many dishes from cuisines around the world. At the rear, there is a large beer garden and patio area with seating and a TV screen. Parking is provided by a modest parking area behind the beer garden.

=== The Old Glais Inn ===
The Old Glais Inn was a local favourite for decades, although it became more widely popular after a change of ownership and an extensive renovation, reopening to customers in October 2023. The pub was permanently closed in October 2025 due to lack of trade and has since been converted into private dwelling flats.

== Sport ==
=== Glais Rugby Club ===
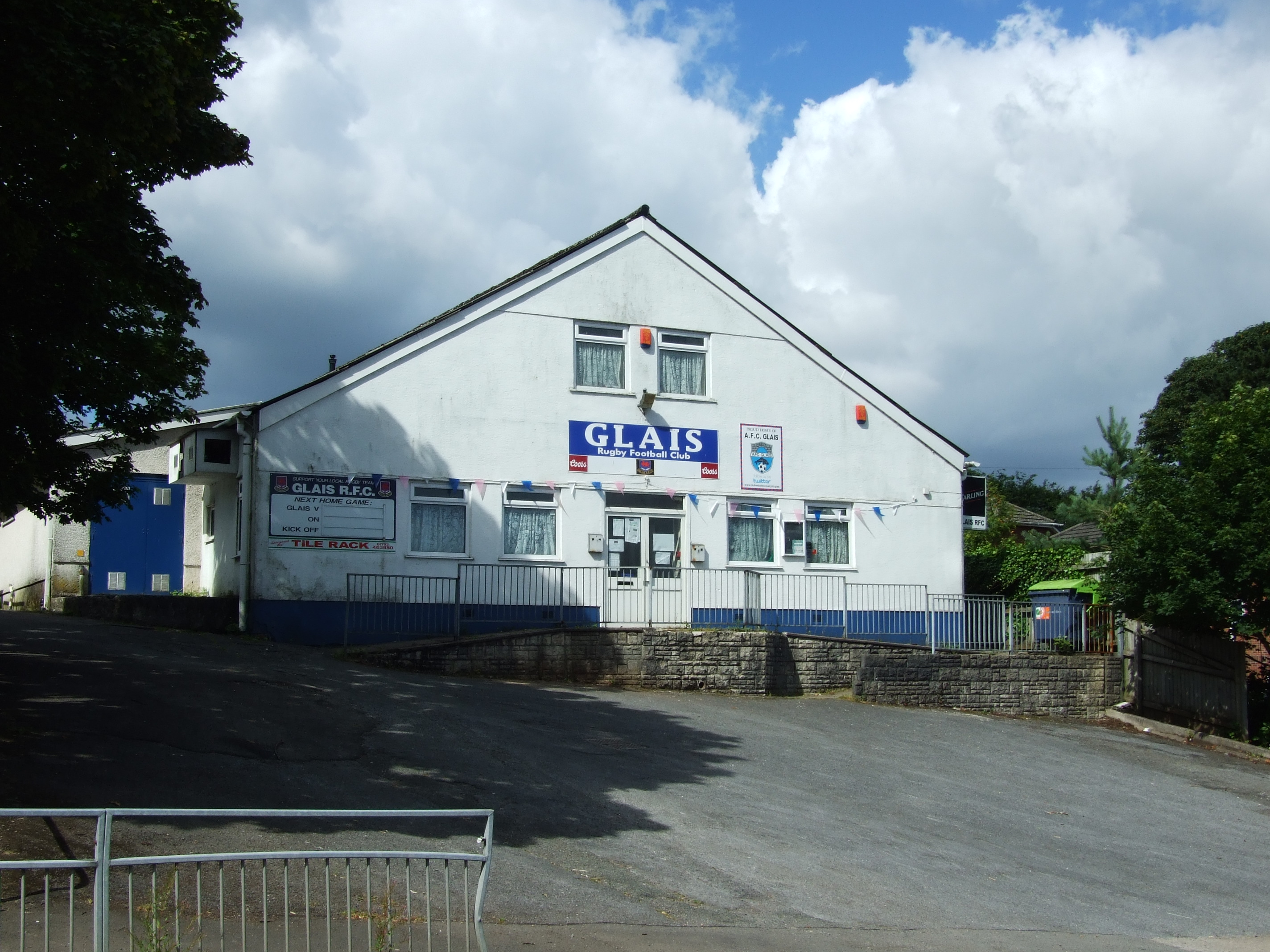
Glais RFC Clubhouse

Glais Rugby Club was formed in 1896 which along with Trebanos RFC can lay claim to being one of the oldest teams in the Clydach district. Albert Harding, father of former Welsh international and British Lion winger Judge Rowe Harding, is credited as being the pioneer of the village's only and still surviving rugby club much to the opposition of a large group of residents against sport at the time.

Originally playing in green and gold colours this changed to blue and white hoops before finally settling on all blue. At the beginning of its existence Glais was considered a "nomadic" club, playing their home games at several sites including the Mond Field and Garth Field before establishing their home ground permanently at Glais Rugby Field.

In 1912–1913 the club won its first major trophy as champions of the Swansea and District R.U. Challenge Cup, this came after losing out to the second division championship via a play-off game against Cwmtwrch at Ystalyfera. Estimates place crowd attendance above 3,000 which is far in excess of the population of Glais.

Glais Rugby Club ran out with much success during the 1920s and won several Swansea District titles between 1922 and 1927 which included one fourth division league and cup title, one third division league title, one second division cup title, three first division league titles and one first division cup title. Glais had also finished the 1928 season top of the First Division yet again however this triumph was invalidated after an administration error meant the club had not been registered at the beginning of the 1928 season.

The club is part of the Glais community and plays in the SWALEC Division 5 South West. The club maintains a rivalry with Vadre Rugby Club.

=== Glais Football Club ===
AFC Glais Badge

AFC Glais is a community-focused football club formed in 2011. The club is based out of Pontardawe Recreation Grounds. The club comprises three teams, the Firsts, Reserves and Thirds - as well as numerous youth teams.

As of the 2026/27 season, the First team competes in the Macron West Wales Premier League, with the Reserves and Thirds competing in the Macron Neath & District Division 2 and Division 4, respectively.

== History ==
In the early 20th century, Glais was a small village with a strong religious community. Up to four churches of differing denominations existed at the time, the oldest of which was a Welsh Dissident chapel called Pentwyn that was built in 1834 upon a glacial moraine which itself was called Y Garth. The name plate for Pentwyn was later moved to a new chapel of worship called Seion Chapel (Welsh: Capel Seion) in 1840 which still exists to the present day, albeit now closed.

On 15 April 1912, W.J. Rogers, a resident of Glais and his nephew Evan Davies, a resident of Alltwen, lost their lives aboard the RMS Titanic. Their bodies were never recovered and thus they were commemorated on the family headstone in Seion Chapel.

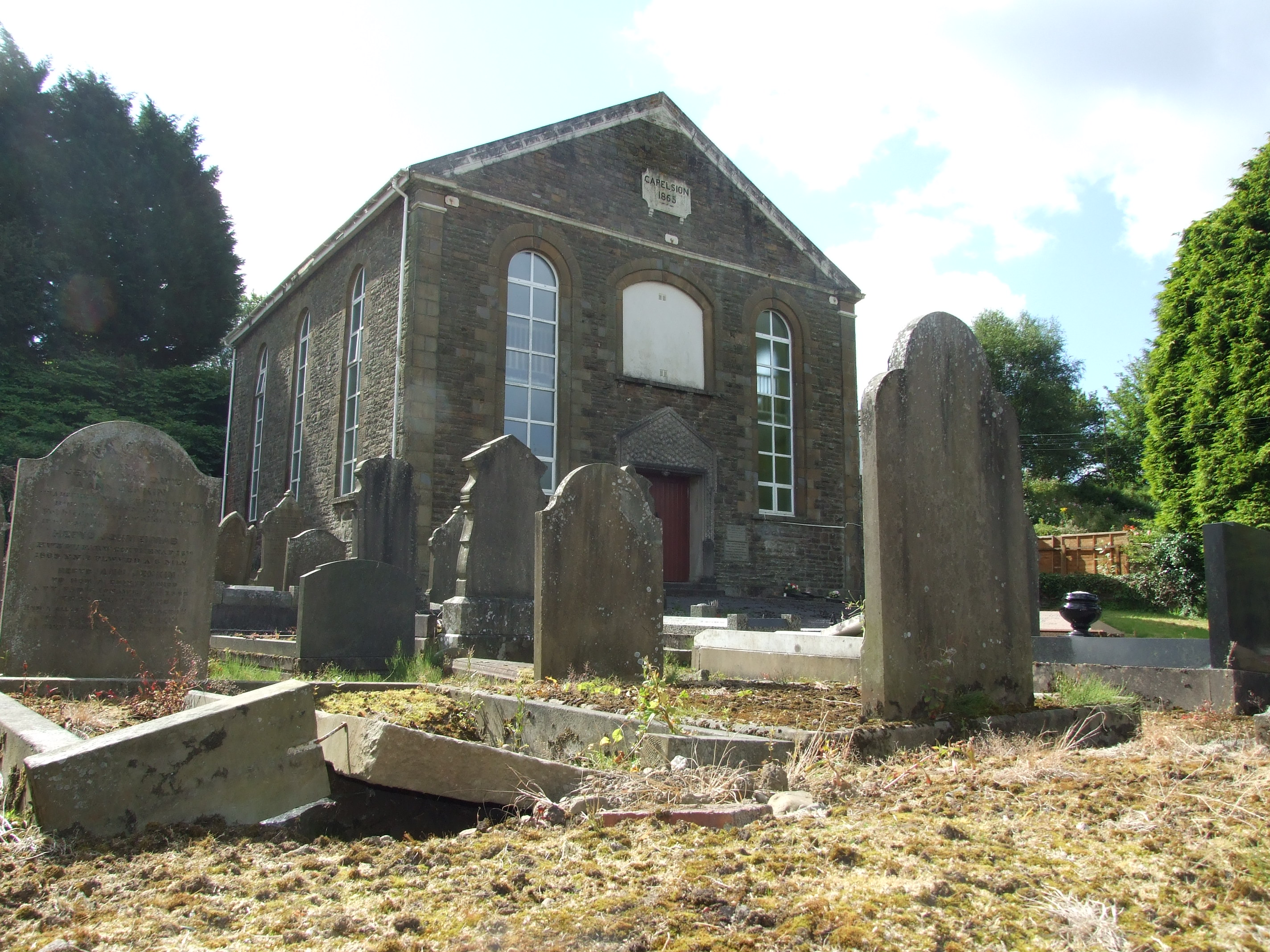
Seion Chapel

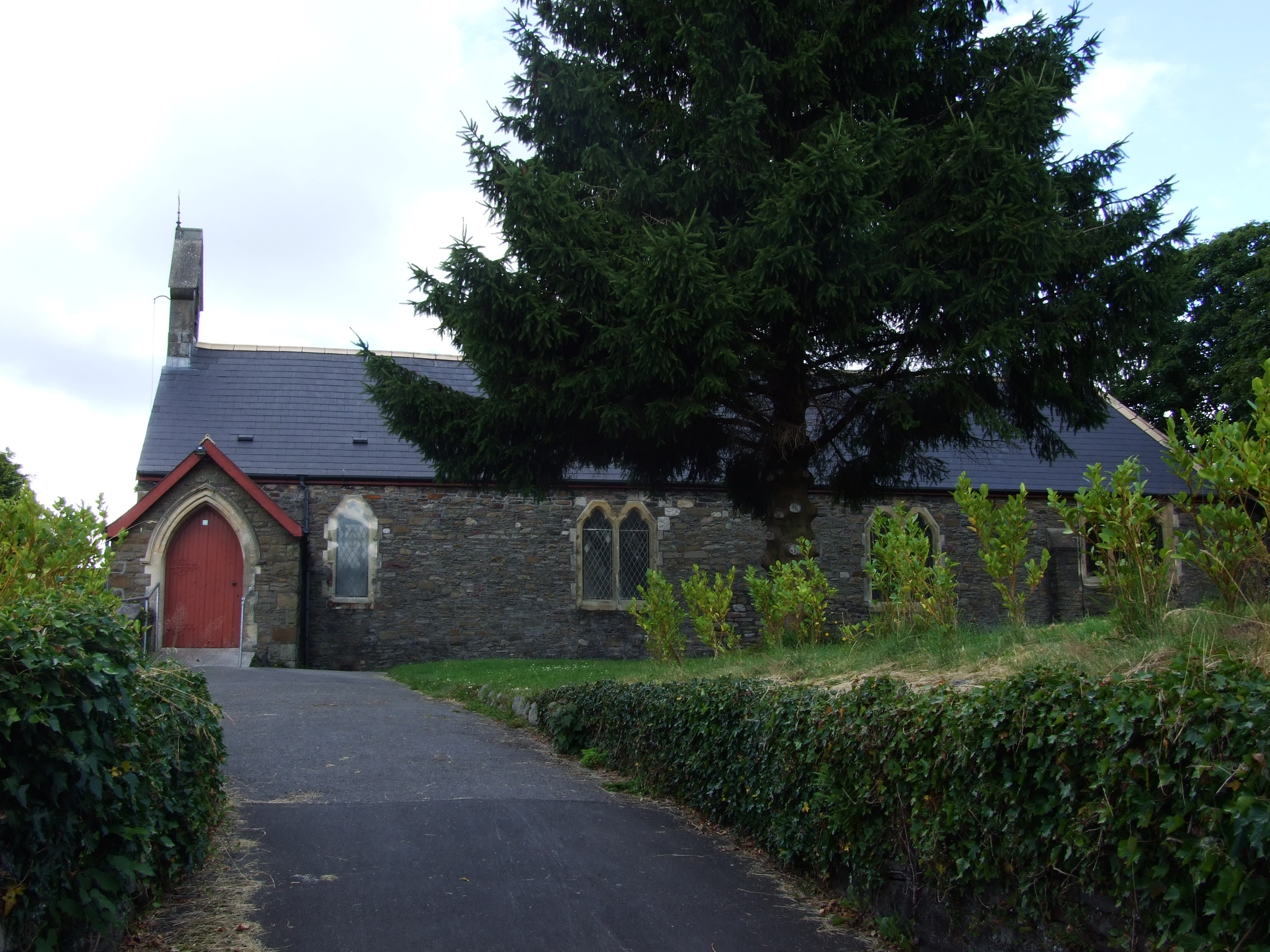
St. Paul's Church

In 1881 an Anglican Church, St Paul's, was built on Cefn y Garth, what is now School Road. St. Paul's is still a practicing church in use with local residents for services of worship and other services. A year later in 1882 and on the same road, Glais Primary School was opened to the public for children aged under 11 years old.

In 1891 a Welsh Baptist chapel, Peniel, was built on Station Road and closed in 1999.

Cattle were driven from as far away as Llandeilo and kept in pens until they were collected by their new owners and moved to their new farm, suggesting that Glais might have acted as a commercial hub for the farm trade in the early years of the history of the village.

=== Glais Railway Stations ===
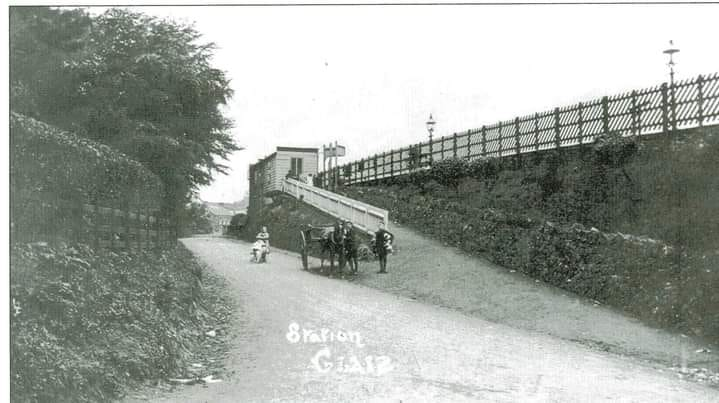
Glais (2nd) Station

Glais has previously hosted two railway stations, both part of the Swansea Vale Railway. The first was Glais Station, located near present day Graigola Road, which opened on 21 February 1860, and closed on 1 March 1875 upon the opening of the second station. The second, Glais (2nd) Station, was opened in March 1875 and closed to passengers 25 September 1950 – the station closed completely on 4 October 1965. The second station was located adjacent to Station Road, hence its name. Glais was also home to one of the SVR's junctions, Glais Junction, located near Seion Chapel.

=== Glais Stadium ===
The village hosted a racecourse sometime during the 19th and 20th centuries, but the first known reference is from 1920 for an equestrian event. The facility was amended for pedestrianism and Greyhound Racing in 1928 after the Swansea Corporation decided not to allow Greyhound Racing at St Helen's in Swansea town's centre. Glais Stadium hosted greyhound racing until 1939. By the 1960s, Glais Stadium had been transformed into a general recreational facility with bowling green, tennis courts and sports fields. The earlier stand was retained. Today, the sports grounds are largely taken up by the 18-hole Tawe Vale Golf Club, a former 9-hole works course developed for use by employees of the then INCO Nickel Works (the former Mond Nickel Works) nearby. The bowling green survived.

== Geography ==
=== Glacial Terminal Moraine ===
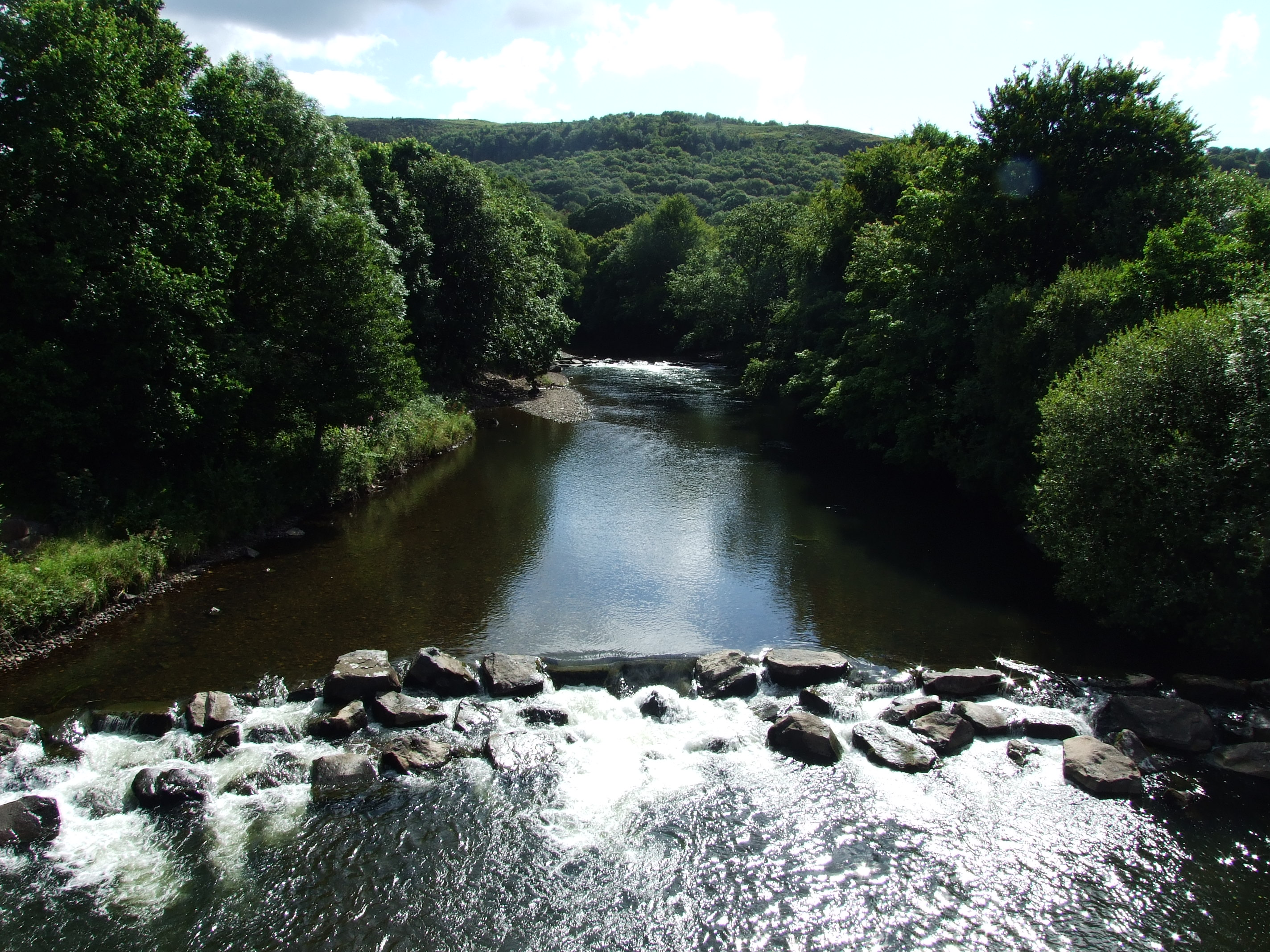
River Tawe diverted by the moraine in Glais

A rare example of a glacial terminal moraine in the south of the village is one of over a thousand sites in Wales that are officially designated Sites of Special Scientific Interest. Named Y Garth, it is regarded as "the largest and most impressive of the South Wales valley moraines".

The site is largely undisturbed by industrial human activity apart from an old and disused coal mine, with many of the rocks carried from far afield during the last Ice Age still exposed for scientific study today. Due to the large size of the moraine the River Tawe, Swansea's largest river, is diverted through natural means to the west towards Clydach. The site also contains a natural wall that drops 130 feet downward at the front of the moraine due to the material from further up the valley being deposited during the last Ice Age.

=== Graig Ola Mountain ===
Graig Ola, often referred to as Glais Mountain, rises 209m (686ft) above sea level. The peak is popular with walkers and offers easy ascents on foot, close proximity to roads, and panoramic views of the Swansea Valley.

== Transport ==
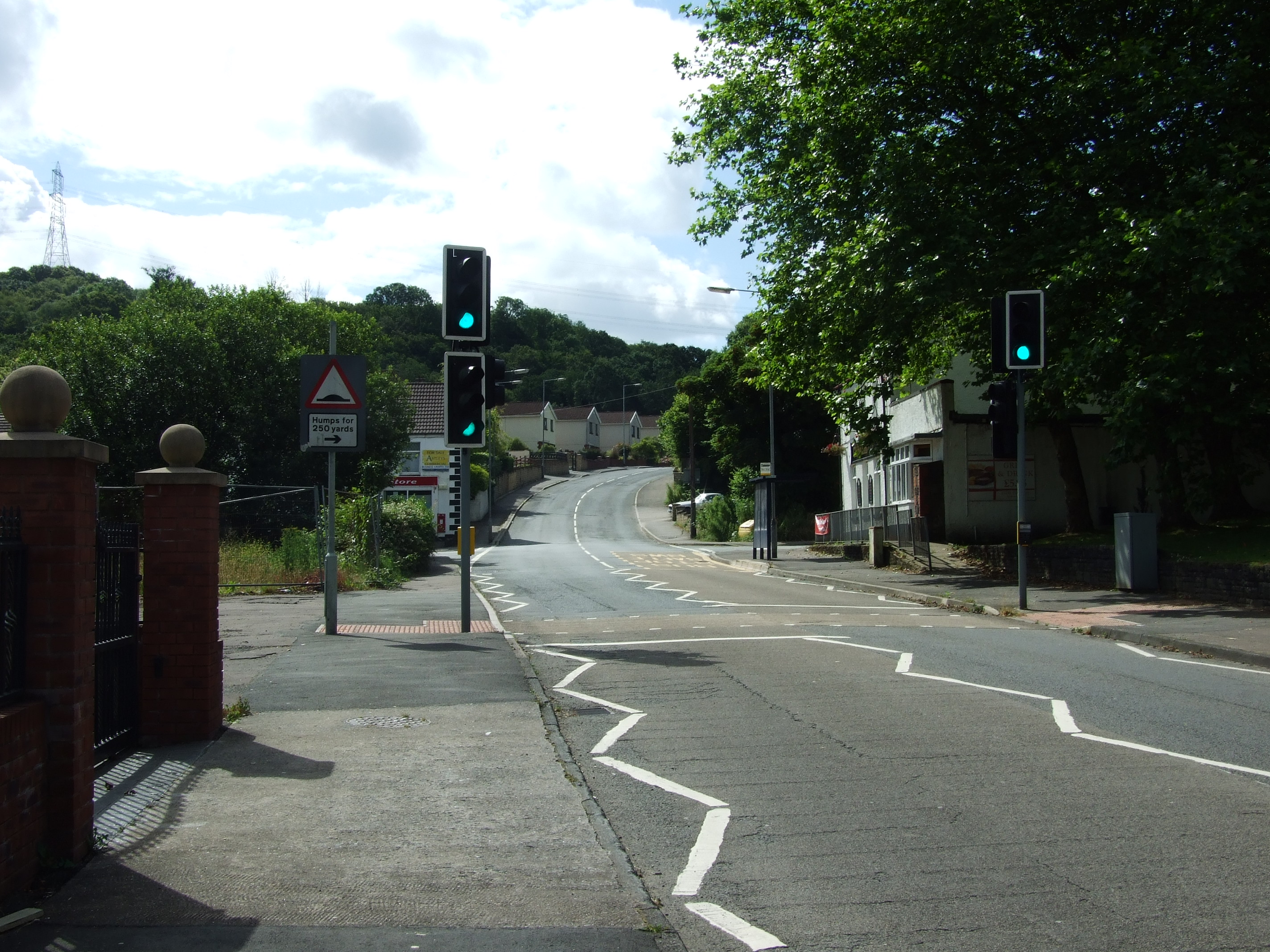
The B4291 passing through in Glais

=== Roads ===
The B4291 (Birchgrove Road) passes through the centre of the village, providing a route between Clydach and Skewen. Birchgrove Road crosses over the River Tawe via Glais Bridge, before intersecting the A4067 bypass at a roundabout – the bypass connects west to Ynysforgan Roundabout and Junction 45 of the M4, as well as connecting north east to Sennybridge. Ynysymond Road runs from Glais to Alltwen.

=== Public transport ===
There are eight bus stops across the village. As of July 2025, three public bus routes actively operate and stop in Glais, these being:

- 45 service (Swansea to Morriston) operated by Adventure Travel
- X26 service (Brynamman to Swansea) operated by DANSA
- 967 service (Glais to Gower College Swansea Tycoch Campus) operated by First Cymru

Both the S13 (Llansamlet to Cwmtawe School) and Q services (Margam to Gower College Swansea Gorseinon Campus) operated by South Wales Transport also operate in Glais, however specifically as school/college bus services and are not open to the general public.

There are nearby Comprehensive Schools: Birchgrove Comprehensive and Cwmtawe Comprehensive. Birchgrove provides free bus travel through private contractors; Cwmtawe pupils pay a small fee.

== Notable people ==
=== Nicholas of Glais ===
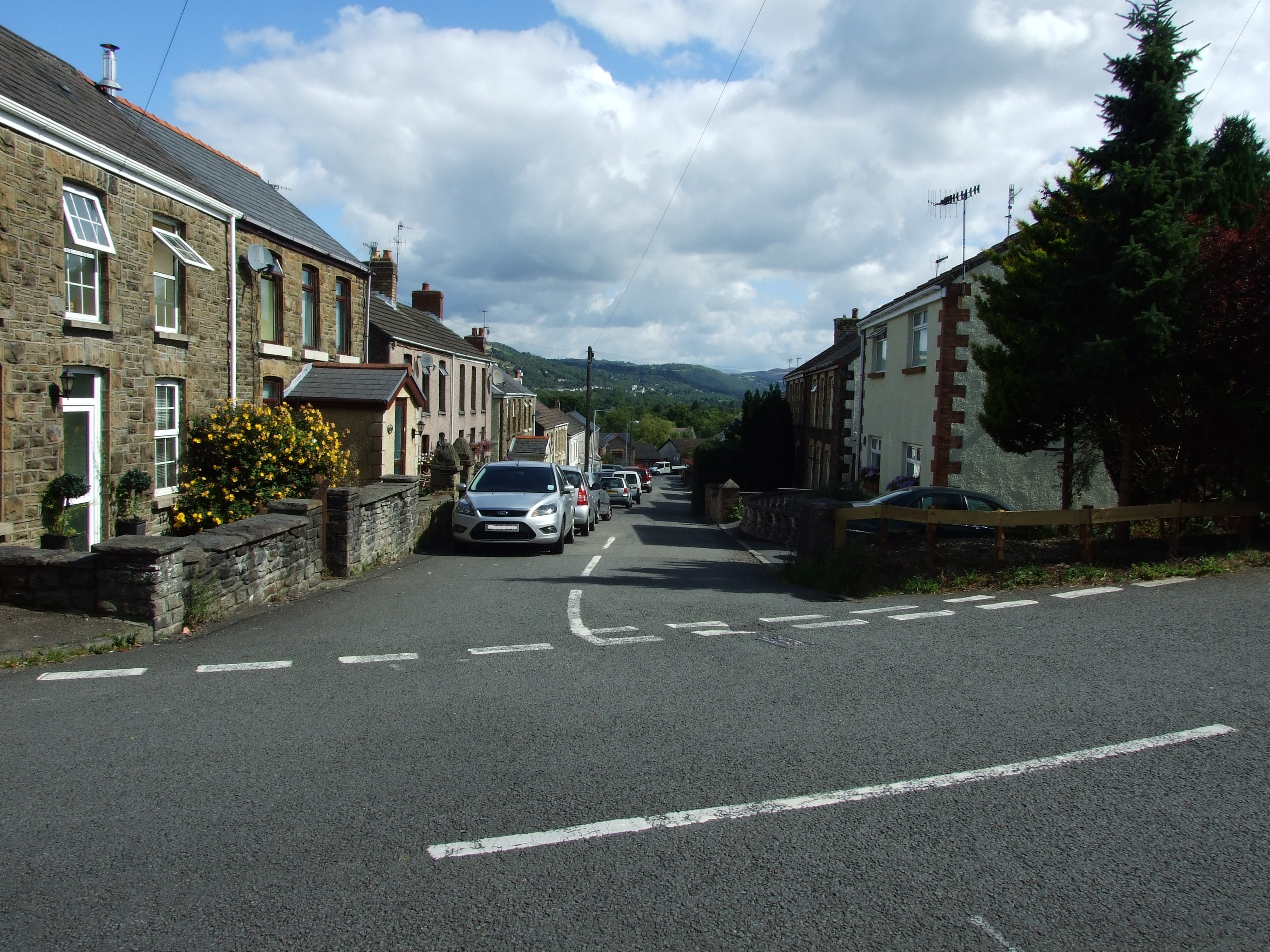
Nicholas Road

Thomas Evan Nicholas (6 October 1879 – 19 April 1971) – the famous Welsh poet and radical, known as Niclas y Glais, was a minister at Seion Chapel in Glais between 1904 and 1914 – he won over 17 eisteddfod chairs during his time at Glais. He helped found the Independent Labour Party, supported the coal miners of Glais in the disputes of 1905, 1909–10, and 1911, and was Welsh editor of the Merthyr Pioneer, the ILP newspaper. Arrested in WW2 at the same time as the Communist South Wales Miners leaders, he was not released when the miners went on strike until their leaders were released, but was instead kept in prison for four months – first in Swansea, then in Brixton. He was subject to intense examination from MI5, however he was eventually released due to lack of evidence. He is popularly known as Nicholas of Glais, and the street Nicholas Road in the village is named after him.

=== The Lord Baron Arwyn ===
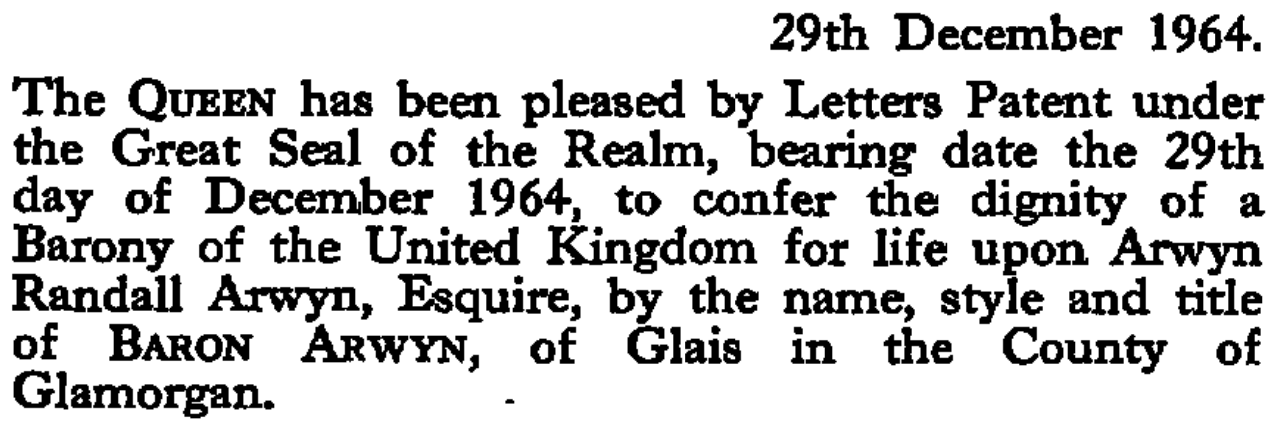
Newspaper snippet from a 1964 edition of The London Gazette.

Arwyn Randall Davies, Baron Arwyn of Glais in the County of Glamorgan (17 April 1897 – 23 February 1978) – a Welsh Labour life peer. The Lord Arwyn was a member of the House of Lords from 29 December 1964 until his death on 23 February 1978.

== Glais Rugby Club ==
Glais Rugby Club was formed in 1896 which along with Trebanos can lay claim to being one of the oldest teams in the Clydach district. Albert Harding, father of former Welsh international and British Lion winger Judge Rowe Harding, is credited as being the pioneer of the village's only and still surviving rugby club much to the opposition of a large group of residents against sport at the time.

Originally playing in green and gold colours this changed to blue and white hoops before finally settling on all blue. At the beginning of its existence Glais was considered a "nomadic" club, playing their home games at several sites including the Mond Field and Garth Field before establishing their home ground permanently at Glais Rugby Field.

In 1912–1913 the club won its first major trophy as champions of the Swansea and District R.U. Challenge Cup, this came after losing out to the second division championship via a play-off game against Cwmtwrch at Ystalyfera. Estimates place crowd attendance above 3,000 which is far in excess of the population of Glais.

Glais Rugby Club ran out with much success during the 1920s and won several Swansea District titles between 1922 and 1927 which included one fourth division league and cup title, one third division league title, one second division cup title, three first division league titles and one first division cup title. Glais had also finished the 1928 season top of the First Division yet again however this triumph was invalidated after an administration error meant the club had not been registered at the beginning of the 1928 season.

The club is still well known in the Glais community and plays in the SWALEC Division 5 South West. There is also some healthy competition between the club and Vadre Rugby Club.

== Local media ==
In 2014, Glais Forum was set up as a Facebook group to keep the villagers of Glais up to date with matters affecting their community. As of July 2025, the group has 1.2k contributing members.
