= Clydach-on-Tawe railway station =

Disused railway station in Swansea, Wales

Clydach-on-Tawe
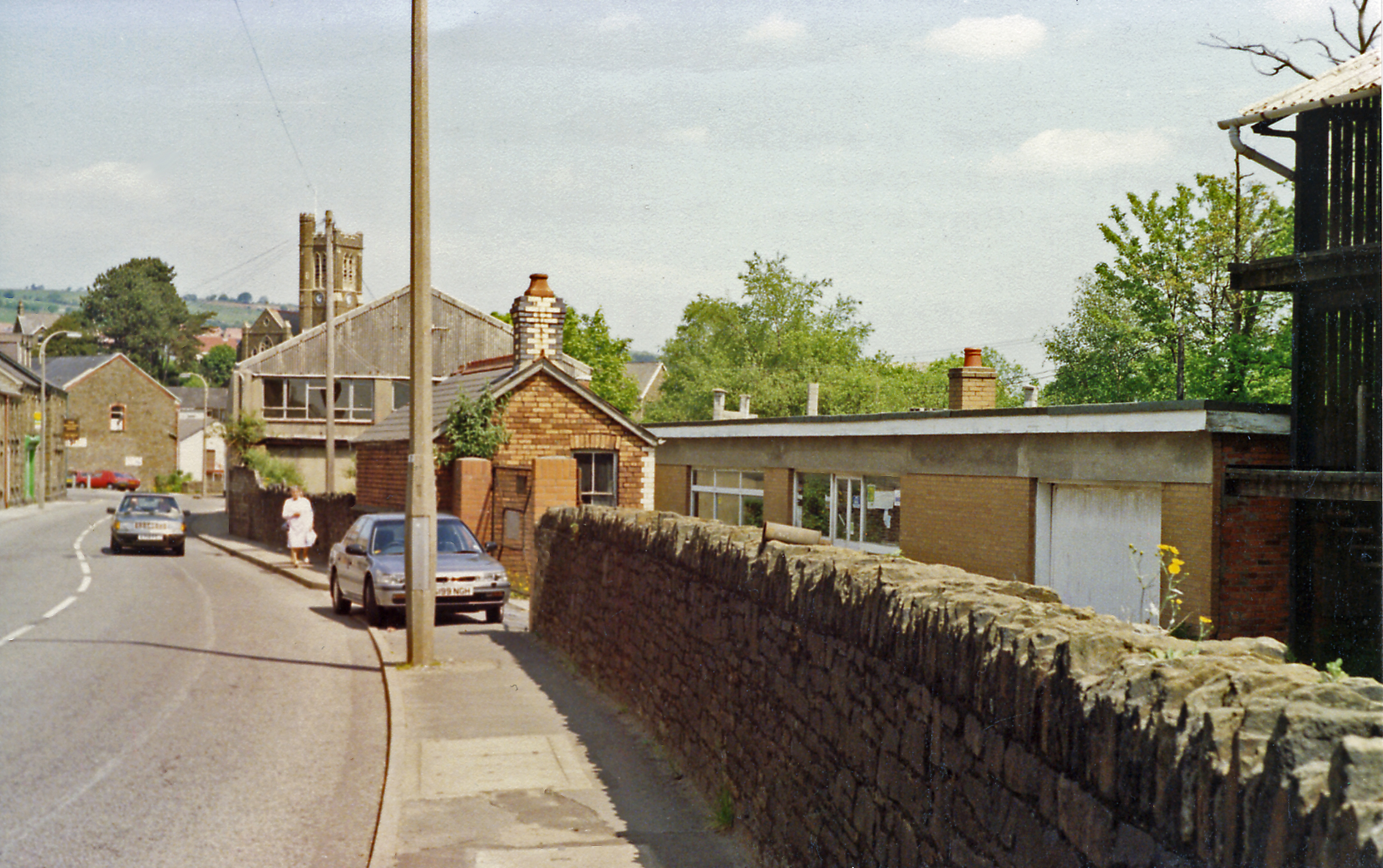
- The station site in 1998

General information
- Location: Clydach, Swansea; Wales
- Coordinates: 51.690324°N 3.900713°W
- Platforms: 2

Other information
- Status: Disused

History
- Original company: Midland Railway
- Post-grouping: London, Midland and Scottish Railway; British Railways

Key dates
- January 1885: Opened
- 25 September 1950: Closed to passengers
- 4 October 1965: Closed to all traffic
Location

Clydach-on-Tawe railway station served the community of Clydach and Ynystawe in Swansea, Wales, from 1885 to 1965 on the Swansea Vale Railway.

== History ==
The station was opened in 1885 by the Midland Railway. The station was situated off Clydach Road. The station was renamed Clydach-on-Tawe South in early 1950 before being closed to passengers on 25 September 1950 and completely on 4 October 1965. The site is now part of the Players Industrial Estate with the old station building in use as an office but the rest of the site is now occupied by industrial.

Preceding station	Disused railways	Following station
Morriston East; Line and station closed	Midland Railway; Swansea Vale Railway	Glais (2nd); Line and Station closed
