= Morriston East railway station =

Disused railway station in Morriston, Swansea

Morriston East

General information
- Location: Morriston, Swansea; Wales
- Coordinates: 51.6637°N 3.9188°W
- Grid reference: SS673978
- Platforms: 2

Other information
- Status: Disused

History
- Original company: Swansea Vale Railway
- Pre-grouping: Midland Railway
- Post-grouping: London, Midland and Scottish Railway

Key dates
- 2 October 1871: Opened
- 1 March 1875: Resited
- January 1950: Name changed to Morriston East
- 25 September 1950: Closed
Location

Morriston East railway station served the community of Morriston, in the historical county of Glamorganshire, Wales, from 1871 to 1950 on the Swansea Vale Railway.

== History ==
The station was opened on 2 October 1871 by the Swansea Vale Railway. It was originally a terminus but it was resited as a through station on 1 March 1875. Its name was changed to Morriston East in January 1950. It closed on 25 September 1950.

Preceding station	Disused railways	Following station
Upper Bank; Line and station closed	Swansea Vale Railway	Clydach-on-Tawe; Line and station closed
