= Pontardawe railway station =

Disused railway station in Clydach-on-Tawe, Swansea

Pontardawe
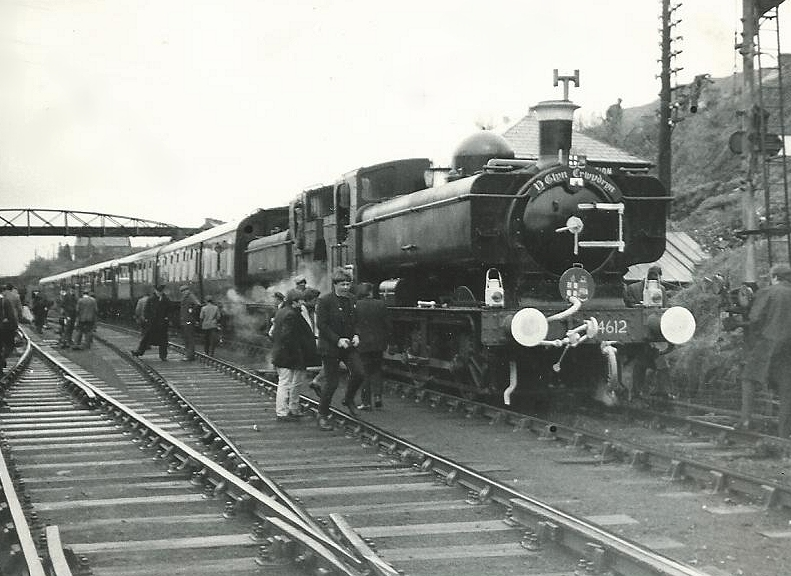

General information
- Location: Pontardawe, Neath Port Talbot; Wales
- Coordinates: 51.7171°N 3.8470°W
- Platforms: 2

Other information
- Status: Disused

History
- Original company: Midland Railway
- Post-grouping: London, Midland and Scottish Railway; Western Region of British Railways

Key dates
- 21 February 1860: Opened
- 25 September 1950: Closed to passengers
- 4 October 1965: Closed to all traffic
Location

Pontardawe railway station was a railway station on the Swansea Vale Railway that served the town of Pontardawe in West Glamorgan, Wales. British Railways closed the station to passengers in 1950. The line continued carrying coal but with the decline in coal mining the station closed completely in 1965.

== Present day ==
It was sited next to the Pontardawe Inn, known as the Gwachel, and the Victorian bridge over the Tawe. It is now occupied by the A4067 road.

Preceding station	Disused railways	Following station
Glais (2nd); Line and station closed	Midland Railway; Swansea Vale Railway	Ynysygeinon; Line and Station closed
