= 1928 Irish Greyhound Derby =

Irish greyhound race

1928 National Derby
- Venue: Harold's Cross Stadium
- Location: Dublin
- End date: 18 August

The 1928 National Derby took place during August with the final being held at Harold's Cross Stadium in Dublin on 18 August 1928. It was the inaugural edition of the event. The race at this stage was considered unofficial because it had not been ratified by the Irish Coursing Club.

The winner was Tipperary Hills, owned and trained by Billy Quinn.

== Final result ==
At Harolds Cross, 18 August (over 525 yards):

Position	Winner	Breeding	Trap	SP	Time	Trainer
1st	Tipperary Hills	Melksham Tom - Na Boc E				Billy Quinn
?	Curristown	Kashmir Kipper - Lady Peggy II				John Shannon
?	Battle Island	unknown				PJ Graham
?	Happy Man	unknown				M Hammond
?	False Favourite	unknown				C Forde
?	Gilly Gooly	unknown				D O'Neill

== Semi finals ==
Heat 1 (Aug 16)
Pos	Name	SP	Time
1st	Tipperary Hills		30.72
2nd	Battle Island		30.80

Heat 2 (Aug 16) six ran
Pos	Name	SP	Time
1st	Curristown	4-1	30.95
2nd	Gilly Gooly	1-1f	31.15

Heat 3 (Aug 16) five ran
Pos	Name	SP	Time
1st	Happy Man	6-4f	31.10
2nd	False Favourite	7-1	31.42

- 1 length calculated at 0.08 sec

== See also ==
- 1928 UK & Ireland Greyhound Racing Year
