= Arwyn Davies, Baron Arwyn =

The Right Honourable The Lord Arwyn

Member of the House of Lords Lord Temporal
- In office 29 December 1964 – 23 February 1978; Life Peerage

Personal details
- Born: 17 April 1897
- Died: 23 February 1978 (aged 80)
- Party: Labour
- Spouse: Norah Davies

Arwyn Randall Davies, Baron Arwyn (17 April 1897 – 23 February 1978) was a Welsh Labour life peer.

He was a Chartered Mining Engineer, businessman and company director.

== Marriage and family ==
He was married to Norah Davies, with children the Honourable Elisabeth Macnab, the Honourable Mary Webb and the Honourable Hugh Davies. He married secondly Beatrix Emily Bassett (née Organ).

== Baron Arwyn ==
Davies took the name of Arwyn in lieu of Davies by Deed Poll on 14 December 1964 prior to being made a peer. On 29 December 1964, he was created a life peer as Baron Arwyn, of Glais in the County of Glamorgan. He was introduced to the House of Lords on 21 January 1965.

Coat of arms of Arwyn Davies, Baron Arwyn

Crest
On the battlements of three turrets instant from the battlements of a tower Gules a ram about to charge Sable armed imguled and villene Or.
Escutcheon
Per chevron Vert and Or on a chevron between in dexter chief a pick Proper and a sword in saltire Argent hilt and pommel Or in sinister chief a like sword and pick in saltire and in base a three-masted ship in full sail Sable a cross formy Gules between two open books chevronwise Proper.
Supporters
Dexter a Cornish Chough Proper, sinister a dragon Gules, both with wings addressed.
Motto
Gwasanaethaf
