= Upper Bank railway station =

Disused railway station in Swansea, West Glamorgan

Upper Bank
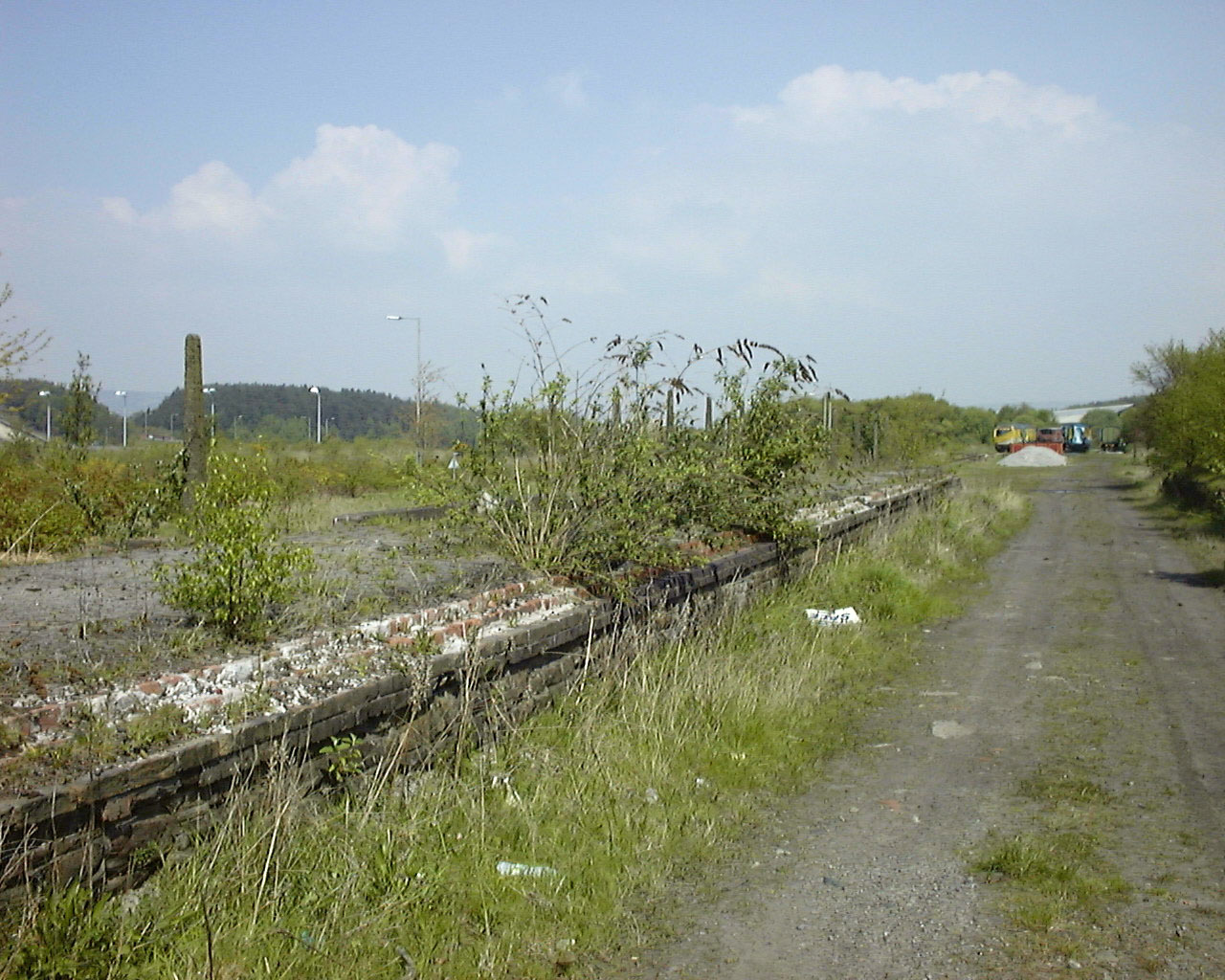
- The site of the station in 1998

General information
- Location: Swansea, West Glamorgan; Wales
- Coordinates: 51.6402°N 3.9263°W
- Grid reference: SS667952
- Platforms: 2

Other information
- Status: Disused

History
- Original company: Swansea Vale Railway
- Pre-grouping: Midland Railway
- Post-grouping: London, Midland and Scottish Railway

Key dates
- September 1863: Opened
- 25 September 1950: Closed to passengers
- 1960s: Closed completely
Location

Upper Bank railway station served the city of Swansea, West Glamorgan, Wales from 1871 to the 1960s on the Swansea Vale Railway.

== History ==
The station opened in September 1863 by the Swansea Vale Railway. The line was taken over by the Midland Railway in 1876. The station closed to passengers on 25 September 1950 and closed completely in the 1960s. By 1985, the only trace left was the section preserved by the Swansea Vale Railway Society. In 2007, Swansea Council decided to redevelop the area and by 2010 there was no trace left.

Preceding station	Disused railways	Following station
Swansea St Thomas; Line and station closed	Swansea Vale Railway	Morriston East; Line and station closed
