= Glais (2nd) railway station =

Disused railway station in Glais, Swansea

Glais (2nd)

General information
- Location: Glais, Swansea; Wales
- Coordinates: 51.689812°N 3.879557°W
- Platforms: 2

Other information
- Status: Disused

History
- Original company: Midland Railway
- Post-grouping: London, Midland and Scottish Railway; Western Region of British Railways

Key dates
- January 1885: Opened
- 25 September 1950: Closed to passengers
- 1956: Closed to all traffic
Location

Glais railway station served the community of Glais in Swansea, Wales from 1885 to 1965 on the Swansea Vale Railway.

== History ==
The station was opened in 1885 by the Midland Railway. The station was situated on Station Road. The station closed to passengers on 25 September 1950 and completely on 4 October 1965.

Preceding station	Disused railways	Following station
Clydach-on-Tawe; Line and station closed	Midland Railway; Swansea Vale Railway	Pontardawe; Line and Station closed
