= Swansea St Thomas railway station =

Disused railway station in Swansea, West Glamorgan

Swansea St Thomas

General information
- Location: Swansea, West Glamorgan; Wales
- Coordinates: 51.622109°N 3.934261°W
- Grid reference: SS667952
- Platforms: 2

Other information
- Status: Disused

History
- Original company: Swansea Vale Railway
- Pre-grouping: Midland Railway
- Post-grouping: London, Midland and Scottish Railway

Key dates
- 21 February 1860: Opened to passengers
- 25 September 1950: closed to passengers
- 1960s: Closed completely
Location

Swansea St Thomas railway station served the city of Swansea, West Glamorgan, Wales from 1860 to the 1960s on the Swansea Vale Railway.

== History ==
The station was opened to passengers in 1860 by the Swansea Vale Railway. The line was taken over by the Midland Railway in 1876. The station closed to passengers on 25 September 1950 and closed completely in the 1960s. The site was demolished thereafter and the trackbed and site is now part of New Cut Road (A483) and (A4067) where the two roads meet. A small play area is present and this is the site of the station.

Preceding station	Disused railways	Following station
Upper Bank; Line and station closed	Swansea Vale Railway	Terminus
