= Askern Greyhound Stadium =

Greyhound racing venue in Askern, England

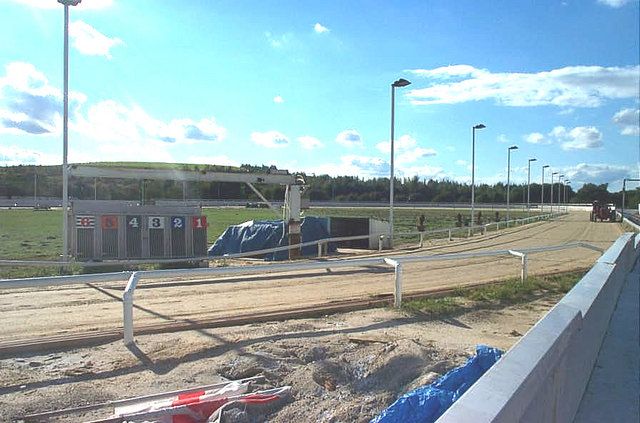
- The track in 2006
- Interactive map of Askern Greyhound Stadium
- Location: Selby Road, Askern, near Doncaster, South Yorkshire, DN6 0ES
- Coordinates: 53°37′29.7″N 1°9′14″W

Construction
- Opened: 1939
- Closed: 2022

Website
- https://askerngreyhoundstadium.weebly.com/

Askern Greyhound Stadium is a former greyhound racing stadium in Selby Road, Askern, near Doncaster, South Yorkshire. The track was independent (unaffiliated to a governing body) and racing took place every Wednesday and Friday at 7.15pm with occasional Sunday racing until it ceased on Friday 23 September 2022. Facilities included a club room, bar and fast food.

== Origins ==
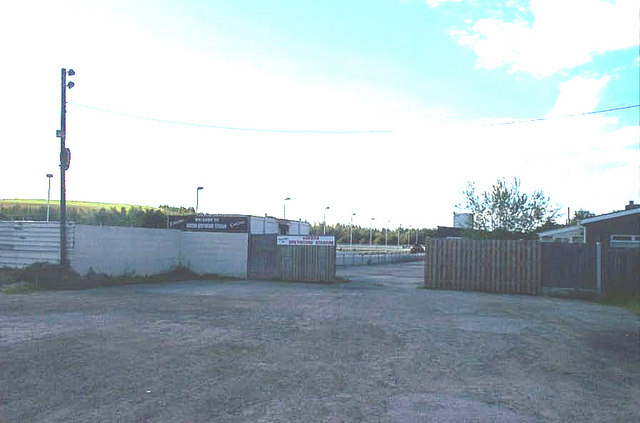
Entrance to the stadium

Askern applied for a betting licence during 1938 and it was approved on 15 October 1938. The track was constructed north of Askern on the west side of Selby Road and the east side of the Askern branch of the London, Midland and Scottish Railway in an area known as Norton Common.

== History ==
The racing was independent (unaffiliated to a governing body) and is believed to have started in 1939.

In the 1980s the track had a circumference of 350 yards and race over distances of 225, 425m and 600 metres with an Inside Sumner hare system. Described as a tight circuit with a short run to the first bend it had a club house and car park for 100 vehicles. In 1998, the track was run by promoter Harold Askew who leased out his schooling track at the same time in order to oversee proceedings.

Modern race distances remained as 225, 425 and 600 metres and the track ran some races for whippets and lurchers. On 23 September the last race meeting was held and the track closed, leaving just two active independent tracks.
