= Glais Stadium =

Former greyhound racing venue

- Interactive map of Glais Stadium
- Location: Glais, near Swansea, Wales
- Coordinates: 51°41′31″N 3°52′43″W

Construction
- Opened: 1928
- Closed: 1939

Glais Stadium was a sports stadium and greyhound racing in Glais, near Swansea, Wales.

== History ==
Before the greyhound stadium was constructed there was a recreation area and racecourse used for horse racing and pedestrianism. The stadium was built in 1928 and was situated on the northern edge of Glais near Glais Bridge.

Greyhound racing trials took place before a grand opening on 7 July 1928, when over 5,000 attended the race meeting. The first winner was Paddy Baun at 3/1 over 525 yards and the racing was held under National Greyhound Racing Club rules.

The racing (under NGRC rules) which had been introduced by the Welsh Racing and Athletic Association was wound up in October 1928. However, it re-opened in late 1928 following the decision by the Swansea Corporation not to allow racing in the town centre at the St Helens ground. The 17-acre site, including the stadium and kennels were put up for sale by auction on 21 May 1929.

The stadium remained independent (unaffiliated with a governing body) and had a grandstand by 1935 but closed before World War II.

It reverted to being a recreation ground with a bowling green, tennis courts and sports fields. Today it is the Tawe Vale Golf and bowling club.
