= Portsmouth Greyhound Track (Copnor) =

Former greyhound and motorcycle speedway venue

- Interactive map of Portsmouth Greyhound Track (Copnor)
- Location: Portsmouth
- Coordinates: 50°48′12.657″N 1°3′30.943″W

Construction
- Opened: 1928
- Closed: 1930

Tenants
- Greyhound racing motorcycle speedway

Portsmouth Greyhound Track (Copnor) also known as the Wessex Stadium was a greyhound racing and motorcycle speedway track in Portsmouth.

== Origins ==
The city of Portsmouth first experienced greyhound racing at a track known as Copnor. This is a little misleading because the actual site was on Langstone Road between the Walsall and Tamworth Roads which is considerably south of Copnor.

== Opening ==
The first meeting was held on Saturday 30 June 1928 and was held under National Greyhound Racing Club rules based on the fact that the results appeared in the NGRC calendar. The NGRC were vehemently opposed to independent racing and continued to be so more most of its existence.

The Portsmouth Greyhound Racecourse Company initially opened the track but the Greyhound Racing Association (GRA) clearly had an interest in the track as they did with many others because they presented the GRA cup to a Brighton greyhound called Bloxham, the winner of the hurdles match race on opening night. The trophy on behalf of the GRA was presented by Mrs Dixon the wife of the well-known GRA company director Major Dixon. The six five-dog races that supported the hurdle match went the way of the orange jacket of trap five and the first ever winner was Biddy Blue in 33.67 secs at odds of 4-6f.

== History ==
The Portsmouth Greyhound Racecourse Company were responsible for bringing the racing to the public that night despite the financial backing of the GRA. It was common for the GRA to have financial shares in new ventures to ensure their domination of the sport.

The track used a 'Trackless' hare which left the paying public in awe and required an explanation of its workings. The hare attached to a green cord was pulled around the track by a hand powered windlass through specially made clip pulleys. It was claimed to have been invented by Captain Nixon.

== Speedway ==
For speedway, the venue was known as the Wessex Stadium, Copnor Gardens. It hosted racing on an open licence from 1929 to 1930. The site suffered from waterlogging problems.

== Closure ==
The racing although a success only lasted two years and the track closed on 29 November 1930, changing to football and playing fields. It is probable that it closed due to competition; a bigger track at Target Road in Tipner opened.

The site of the Copnor track today is known as Tamworth Park.
