= Swansea Vale Railway =

British railway company (1860–1874)

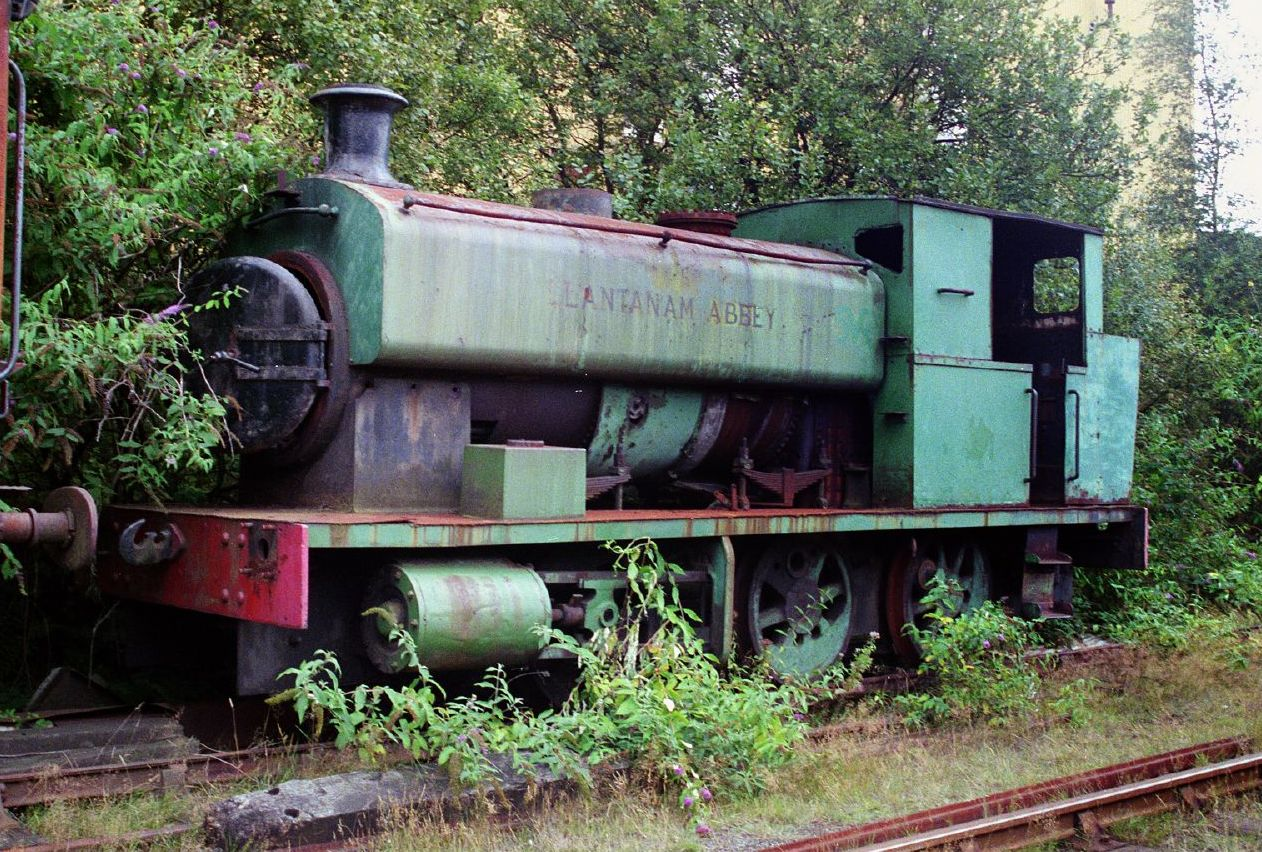
- Llantanam Abbey sitting vandalised after closure of the railway in 2009.
- Locale: Wales

Commercial operations
- Original gauge: 4 ft 8 1/2 in (1,435 mm) standard gauge

Preserved operations
- Preserved gauge: 4 ft 8 1/2 in (1,435 mm) standard gauge

Commercial history
- Opened: 1848
- 1874: Taken over by Midland Railway
- Closed: 1965 (passenger) 1983 (goods)

Preservation history
- 1984: Reopens between Upper Bank and Six Pit
- 2007: Land lease expires; railway closes
- Headquarters: Upper Bank railway station

The Swansea Vale Railway (SVR) was a railway line connecting the port of Swansea in South Wales to industries and coalfields along the River Tawe on the northern margin of Swansea, by taking over a tramroad in 1846. It was extended to Brynamman in 1868. Passengers were carried from 1860, and a loop line through Morriston was built.

The company was profitable but it was always short of capital, and it looked for a larger company to buy it out. The Midland Railway did so in 1874 when it leased the network, and it absorbed it in 1876. The Midland Railway used the line to get access to Swansea, which it had long sought. After 1923 the Midland's successor transferred the through traffic to another route.

Road omnibus services abstracted much of the local passenger business, and only anthracite traffic kept the line going. When that industry declined the railway mineral traffic followed, and from 1965 closures set in. Parts of the network continued for a time, but by 1983 the entire line was closed.

== Before the railway ==
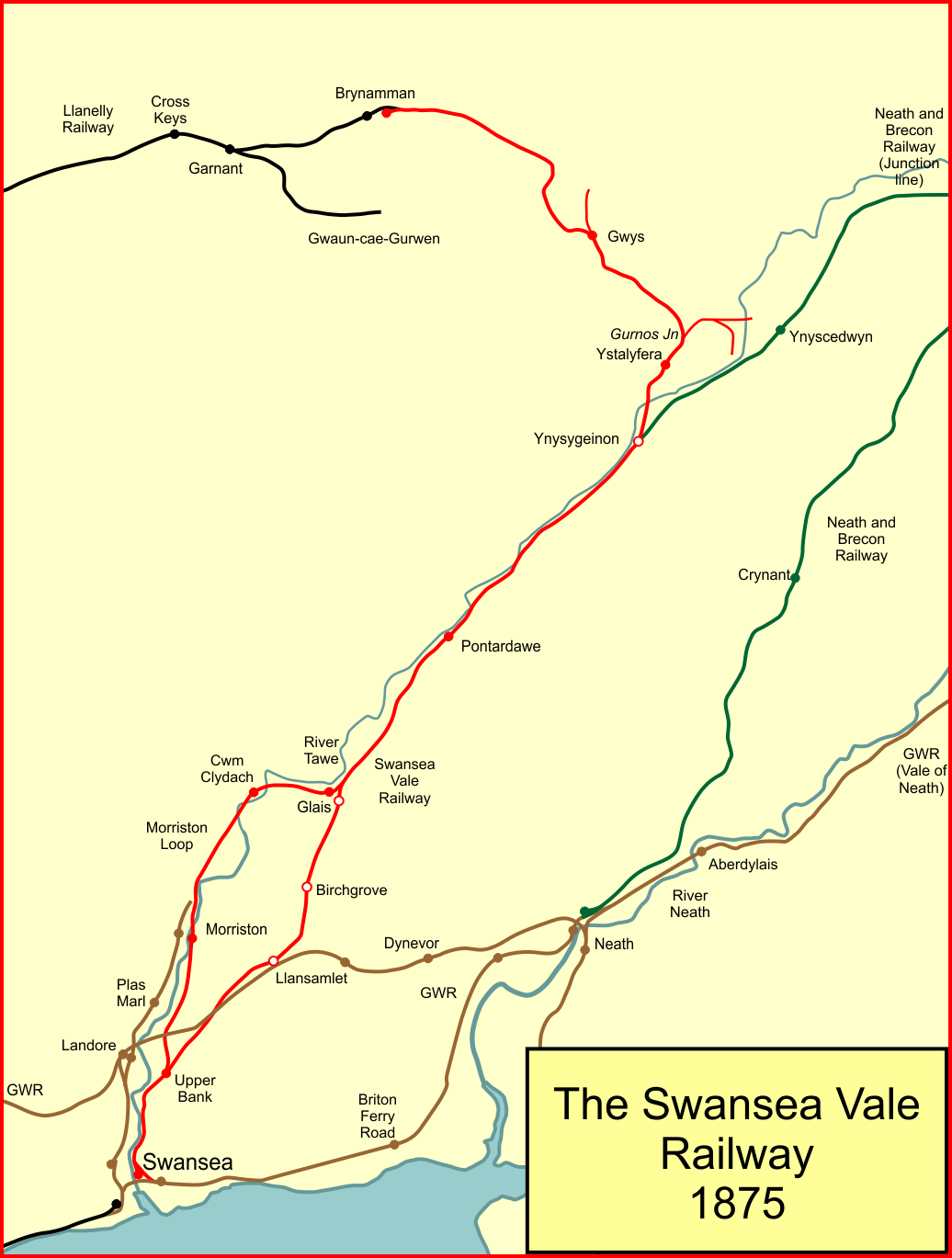
System map of the Swansea Vale Railway in 1875

The South Wales coalfield extends to the sea at Swansea, and therefore was immediately accessible to shipping at a time, before the nineteenth century, when land transport was limited to what pack animals could carry on their backs.

At that time the extraction of copper in Cornwall became an important industry, and as a great deal of coal is required to smelt copper, it became the practice to bring the copper to Swansea by ship and smelt it there.

This specific sector of the metal industry became so dominant that Swansea was given the nickname Copperopolis. The works engaged in this industry were located on the banks of the River Tawe at first, but the construction of the Swansea Canal, opened in 1798, and the development of railways enabled allied metal industries to operate, and to be located further from water transport terminals.

Anthracite coal of high quality was available around Llansamlet, and an early wooden wagonway was built from there to a wharf on the River Tawe by George Kirkhouse; it was operational sometime after 1750. John Scott acquired control of mines on the Gwernllwynchwth Estate and after 1812 built a tram road from there to Foxhole, on the Tawe near its mouth.

In 1834 the Benson family purchased land at the Tyrllandwr Estate and as Swansea harbour developed this gave the family, led by Starling Benson, considerable wharfage land, encouraging the business of shipping coal. The needed transport and in 1839 they commissioned George Bush to survey for a railway. The west bank of the Tawe was heavily developed at this time and his scheme was on the east bank to Abercrave. Public notice was given in 1840 of the intention to build this railway, but in fact it lapsed, probably due to opposition from the Duke of Beaufort.

Nevertheless, Benson and his partners repaired and modernised the 1812 tramroad and made some extension to it over land in their possession, thus not needing parliamentary authorisation.

== Transition to a railway ==
In 1845 the partners transferred their interest to a joint stock company, and in 1846 the tramroad was formally purchased. The name "Swansea Vale Railway" was first used at this time. This appears to mark the change from operating as a tramroad to being a railway.

== South Wales Railway ==
The South Wales Railway (SWR) was authorised in 1845 to build a broad gauge railway from near Gloucester to Milford Haven, connecting South Wales with the Great Western Railway (GWR) network to London. Its route intersected the route of the Swansea Vale Railway.

The SVR hoped to sell its line to the South Wales Railway, and the SWR was amenable, but did not have the parliamentary powers to make the purchase. As a means of by-passing this obstacle, the South Wales Railway sponsored a nominally independent company, the Swansea Valley Railway, to take over the SVR and alter it to the broad gauge.

Swansea Valley Railway Act 1847
- Act of Parliament
- Parliament of the United Kingdom
- Long title: An Act for making a Railway from Abercrave Farm in the Parish of Ystradgunlais in the County of Brecon to Swansea in the County of Glamorgan, with Branches, to be called "The Swansea Valley Railway."
- Citation: 10 & 11 Vict. c. ci
- Territorial extent: United Kingdom

Dates
- Royal assent: 2 July 1847

Other legislation
- Relates to: Swansea Canal Act 1794

Text of statute as originally enacted

The Swansea Valley Railway Act 1847 (10 & 11 Vict. c. ci) was passed in Parliament on 2 July 1847, but with the condition that it could not be sold on to the South Wales Railway until at last half of the authorised capital had been raised and expended on construction. As there was no intention to raise capital or construct anything, this resulted in a stalemate.

In March 1850 the construction of the South Wales Railway reached Llansamlet, and a flat crossing was made by the SWR of the SVR line. To optimise their own gradients they lifted the SVR track, which was of stone block sleeper construction, and this caused a minor argument as the SVR had not been asked for permission.

== Continuing independently ==
Swansea Vale Railway Act 1855
- Act of Parliament
- Parliament of the United Kingdom
- Long title: An Act to enable the Swansea Vale Railway Company to extend their Railway, and to maintain and work the same as a Passenger Railway, and for other Purposes connected therewith.
- Citation: 18 & 19 Vict. c. lx

Dates
- Royal assent: 15 June 1855

Text of statute as originally enacted

It was now obvious to the Swansea Vale Railway directors that their line would remain independent for the foreseeable future, so they assessed what needed to be done to secure the future. Some attempts were made to obtain authorisation for passenger operation, and finally in 1855 the company obtained an act of Parliament, the Swansea Vale Railway Act 1855 (18 & 19 Vict. c. lx) incorporating it, and authorising passenger operation, and permitting extension to Pontardawe, and southwards to the New Cut in Swansea. To neutralise objections in Parliament from the South Wales Railway, it undertook that a third rail (to make mixed gauge track) would be laid southward from the intersection with the South Wales Railway, allowing broad gauge traffic access down to Swansea. The capital of the newly incorporated company was £117,000.

The South Wales Railway agreed to alter the intersection so as to separate the levels of the two lines, and to build a transhipment shed there to reload goods from narrow gauge to broad gauge wagons. These works were completed in 1857.

In 1855 the SVR railway was said to be open for a distance of 6 1/2 miles and only carrying mineral traffic; this amounted to 1,000 tons per day with an annual income exceeding £5,000.

Swansea Vale Railway Extension Act 1856
- Act of Parliament
- Parliament of the United Kingdom
- Long title: An Act to enable the Swansea Vale Railway Company to make Extension and Branch Railways, and for other Purposes.
- Citation: 19 & 20 Vict. c. xcv

Dates
- Royal assent: 14 July 1856

Text of statute as originally enacted

The company obtained a further act of Parliament, the Swansea Vale Railway Extension Act 1856 (19 & 20 Vict. c. xcv), authorising further northward extension to Ystalyfera and Ystradgynlais. (Note: From Miles, Thomas and Watkins. The reference to Ystadgynlais is probably to the pits near there. The Ystradgynlais station of the Neath and Brecon Railway did not get built until 1876, and was not on the same line.)

Through the period from 1856 the company seems to have had trouble raising money for capital works, and a preference share issue was authorised in 1859, although the trading position of the railway was profitable throughout this period.

== Passengers ==
Passenger operation had been authorised and the preparations made for opening from Swansea to Pontardawe for passengers. Captain Ross of the Board of Trade visited the line but he found deficiencies and declined to permit passenger running. Improvements were made and when Colonel Rich of the Board of Trade made a follow-up visit on 20 February 1860 he was satisfied, and passenger trains started running the following day, 21 February 1860. The passenger business was buoyant, and further third-class carriages had to be acquired. Receipts for the half year to August 1860 were £4,912 compared with the previous £3,693, and operating expenses were now £1,740, and rent and rates £683. In later years the practice was usually that the preference shareholders were paid their full dividend but that ordinary shareholders got nothing.

== Extending the line ==
The northward extension had been authorised, but actual construction was slow, largely due to the poor level of subscription for shares. In September 1860 the board decided to open the line as far as a temporary terminus at Ynisygeinon. (Note: Later usually spelt Ynysygeinon.) Late in 1860 the passenger service was extended to that place. (Note: Miles et al; Barrie and Baughan say 21 January 1861, and Quick agrees.)

The extension to Ystalyfera was opened on 20 November 1861.

=== Swansea Vale and Neath and Brecon Junction Railway ===
An essential part of any through route between Hereford and Swansea was the completion of the Swansea Vale and Neath and Brecon Junction Railway (SV&N&BJR), commonly referred to as The Junction Line. This was to run between Colbren Junction on the N&BR to Ynysygeinon on the SVR. Even without Midland Railway involvement, this had been desirable for the N&BR company, giving better access to Swansea than running via Neath.

The Swansea Vale and Neath and Brecon Junction Railway was promoted in 1863 to build a line connecting the Swansea Vale Railway at Ynysygeinon with the Neath and Brecon Railway at Colbren. The Swansea Vale Railway considered that it would abstract traffic from its line, and it decided to petition against it in Parliament. This was not successful, and the SVR&N&BR obtained royal assent to its act of Parliament, the Swansea Vale and Neath and Brecon Junction Railway Act 1864 (27 & 28 Vict. c. ccxciii), on 29 July 1864.

The SV&N&BJR ran into serious financial difficulty; it was unable to secure the subscriptions for shares that it needed to start construction. It entered into a complex arrangement with a contractor, John Dickson, but he fell into bankruptcy at a time when he himself was heavily indebted to the company. For some time, work on the SV&N&BJR was in abeyance. As a moribund company whose only asset was the power to build a line, it was absorbed by the Neath and Brecon Railway (N&BR) on 26 July 1869 under the Neath and Brecon Railway (Amalgamation and Arrangement) Act 1869 (32 & 33 Vict. c. cxlv), and construction was completed, and it was opened to traffic on 19 November 1873.

From that time the N&BR started to run a passenger service between Brecon and Swansea, using the SV&N&BJR line and the Swansea Vale Railway, over which it had running powers.

The SV&N&BJR was to be leased by the N&BR on completion, but when it was clear that no progress toward that goal was being made, it was amalgamated with the Neath and Brecon Railway on 26 July 1869.

=== Brynamman ===
The Llanelly Railway had reached Brynamman from the west in 1842 and was well established in serving the pits there. The coal industry there and in the vicinity was of prime importance and the SVR decided to build a line to it. In 1863 the SVR submitted a bill for more capital at a level of £48,000 to pay for the Brynamman extension and more rolling stock.

It was probably opened to goods traffic in stages, and to passengers throughout on 2 March 1868. The branch off it from Gwys to Brynhenllys Colliery did not open until 1875.

The Llanelly Railway at Brynamman was considered to be an ally, not a competitor, and a connection between the two companies at Brynamman was under construction. The Llanelly Railway was running passenger trains to Brynamman from 20 March 1865.

Through goods and mineral traffic was soon being run over this route, from Swansea to the West Midlands via Brynamman, representing a more convenient through route.

Revenue increased to £9512 by the middle of 1864; the increase was said to be largely due to traffic coming from Llanelly Railway and the Vale of Neath Railway (which was by now mixed gauge) via the Swansea and Neath Railway.

=== Morriston Loop ===
Swansea Vale Railway Act 1867
- Act of Parliament
- Parliament of the United Kingdom
- Long title: An Act for enabling the Swansea Vale Railway Company to construct Branch Railways; and for other Purposes.
- Citation: 30 & 31 Vict. c. xcviii

Dates
- Royal assent: 17 June 1867

Text of statute as originally enacted

The main line had been built on the eastern bank, as it was less developed and land acquisition was expected to be cheaper. Of course, most of the industry and population were on the western bank, and the railway could not serve them directly. The Board decided to propose a Morriston branch; it was to be a loop line off the existing main line, leaving at Upper Bank station and rejoining the original line at Glais. Powers for the construction were granted in the Swansea Vale Railway Act 1867 (30 & 31 Vict. c. xcviii).

It was submitted for inspection to the Board of Trade for passenger operation, and Colonel Hutchinson visited for the purpose; everything was satisfactory and the first part of the line between Morriston and Upper Bank was opened for goods traffic on 6 October 1871. (Note: Miles et al, page 31. The authors do not explain the linkage between the Board of Trade inspection and the opening for goods only, nor say when passenger opening took place.) The section probably opened for passenger traffic on 15 March 1871. (Note: Explanatory note in Quick, although making clear the uncertainty.)

The full length of the Morriston Loop was opened on 2 October 1871 and from that date all passenger trains ran via Morriston and Clydach, with a new station at Glais. The old station at Llansamlet was retained for goods but closed to passengers and Birchgrove closed completely, so the old main line between Glais and Upper Bank was now operated by goods trains only.

In the second half of 1872, the dividend on ordinary shares for the year reached 6%.

== The Midland Railway ==
For some time, the directors of the SVR had believed that sale to a larger company was the solution to their long-standing financial difficulties. Richard Moon and a party of directors of the London and North Western Railway (LNWR) visited the Llanelly Railway in April 1864, and had special train trip over Swansea Vale Railway, but the LNWR was really interested in completion of what became the Central Wales line and expressed no desire to treat with the Swansea Vale.

The Midland Railway was negotiating with the Hereford, Hay and Brecon Railway (HH&BR) in 1869. The Midland had a presence in Hereford from Worcester and was known to aspire to reach South Wales. It was obvious that a route over the HH&BR, the Neath and Brecon Railway and the Swansea Vale Railway would achieve that objective.

On 13 December 1869 the Swansea Vale Railway Board had formal discussions with representatives of the Midland Railway; the negotiation was successful but did not lead to an immediate arrangement. Nevertheless, in August 1870 the Midland Railway agreed to lend £10,000 to the Swansea Vale Railway; the sum was later raised to £20,000.

On 23 August 1872 it was announced that the directors had agreed with the Midland Railway, that they would lease the Swansea Vale Railway. SVR shareholders would receive a permanent 6% dividend. Incidentally the Midland Railway was not interested in this kind of arrangement with the Neath and Brecon Railway (which had taken over the SV&N&BJR) as the N&BR was considerably over-capitalised, following a series of financial improprieties and the failure of a contractor who was also financing much of the construction personally.

The capital of the Swansea Vale Railway at this time was £230,392, and there were loans in existence to the extent of £328,040.

Midland Railway (Swansea Vale Railway Lease) Act 1874
- Act of Parliament
- Parliament of the United Kingdom
- Long title: An Act to lease the Swansea Vale Railway to the Midland Railway Company; and for other purposes.
- Citation: 37 & 38 Vict. c. clxx

Dates
- Royal assent: 30 July 1874

Text of statute as originally enacted

The lease of the Swansea Vale Railway by the Midland was authorised by the Midland Railway (Swansea Vale Railway Lease) Act 1874 (37 & 38 Vict. c. clxx) of 30 July 1874; the Midland actually took possession in September 1874.

From this time the Swansea Vale Railway Company was only a financial entity, receiving the lease charge. Nevertheless, considerable capital expenditure was now being undertaken by the Midland Railway on bringing the SVR track and structures up to date, and this complicated the financial relationship. Accordingly, it was agreed that the Midland Railway Company would absorb the SVR; the Midland Railway (Further Powers) Act 1876 (39 & 40 Vict. c. ccix) to authorise this was obtained on 11 August 1876 and the Swansea Vale Railway Company wound up its affairs and ceased to exist.

== The SVR under Midland control ==
When the Midland Railway took full control of the SVR and the SV&N&BJR, it had already been running its trains on the line under running powers arrangements.

The high dividends paid in the final years of the SVR's independent existence had been achieved by not doing enough maintenance of the line or locomotives. There were a number of track-related derailments in the early period of Midland ownership, and Miles et al attribute them to lack of maintenance. The Midland was no doubt aware of the poor state of the infrastructure of the network it had acquired, and it quickly set about modernising it; track replacement was an early priority, followed by the renewal of some bridges.

Two bridges at Brynamman were renewed in 1875, and the Midland installed signal boxes and block signalling (for the first time probably) during 1875 and 1876.

In 1876 the Midland opened a new goods depot at Swansea on the link line between Swansea St Thomas station and the Eastern Docks. The line was owned by the GWR and access to the depot was under running powers.

The Swansea Vale Railway (SVR) had running powers over the Neath and Brecon Railway (N&BR), so the Midland Railway, as successor to the SVR, ran through trains over the N&BR. The Midland Railway offered to operate all the N&BR domestic trains north of Colbren Junction for one third of receipts, about £4,000 annually. The N&BR reluctantly accepted this arrangement from 1 July 1877 for five years, and the N&BR only operated trains between Colbren Junction and Neath. The arrangement was renewed until in 1889, with the arrival of Sir Edward Watkin as Chairman, the N&BR tried to negotiate better terms. When the talks broke down the Midland Railway abruptly discontinued the through trains on 1 July 1889. For several days there was no service whatever on the N&BR route. The matter went to arbitration and the Midland Railway resumed working the trains from 22 July 1889.

In 1881 the GWR built a branch line to Morriston, and it extended northwards from Morriston itself to Tyrcanol, a distance of about half a mile. The GWR requested a junction at this point, as the two lines were very close together, and this was installed in May 1881; however, it was never used, and it was removed in 1883.

In June 1891 a new marshalling yard was commissioned at Ynysygeinon to handle the colliery traffic coming down the valley.

The GWR had long felt that its network around Swansea was inadequate for efficient handling of its traffic, and in 1911 it promoted the Swansea District line, a new route by-passing Swansea. It intersected the Midland line north of Morriston and was opened in 1913.

At the same time the GWR got authorisation for a line ten miles long from Gwaun-Cae-Gurwen to the Swansea District Line through the Upper Clydach Valley and Pontardawe. Actual construction was delayed by GWR and then by World War I, but a part of it opened in 1922 from Felin Fran to Clydach and in 1923 to Trebanos just south of Potardawe.

From 31 December 1916 the through carriages from Swansea to Birmingham were withdrawn. The transit was very slow, and patronage had never been enough to justify the service.

After 1918 the effect of passenger road omnibuses was felt by the line; at this period, they were slower than the trains, but they ran direct to the centre of Swansea, and often more conveniently through the centre of towns and villages on the route. St Thomas station had been complained of in the past for its lack of proximity to the centre of Swansea.

== Grouping of the railways ==
Following the Railways Act 1922 most of the main line railways of Great Britain were compulsorily merged into one or other of four new large companies, the "groups"; this took effect during 1922. The Midland Railway and the LNWR became constituents of the new London, Midland and Scottish Railway.

The LMS therefore had two routes from Swansea to the Midlands and north, and the former LNWR route was considered to be more convenient operationally.

The discontinuation of the Swansea to Birmingham through carriages in 1916 was now followed by the suspension of through carriages from Swansea to Brecon, from 31 December 1930. The GWR took over responsibility for local passenger and goods services south of Colbren and the LMS ran a connecting service from Colbren on the Neath and Brecon line to Ynysygeinon, but this was unsuccessful, and was itself discontinued from 12 September 1932. On the same date the through goods traffic was re-routed to the former LNWR line.

The SVR network continued to prosper, mainly because of the high-quality anthracite mined within its area; this was considered a premium product, and much was exported to Canada and to France.

== Nationalisation ==
The railways of Great Britain were nationalised at the beginning of 1948. The passenger business had collapsed in the 1930s and the new owner, British Railways, took stock of the situation; the assessment resulted in SVR passenger services being withdrawn from 25 September 1950.

At the same time the traditional industries were by now in steep decline, and many of the anthracite mines closed down. As these were by far the dominant business of the former SVR network, it too suffered.

The Morriston Loop was severed between Glais Junction and the Mond Works just to the north of Clydach in 1956, and the section between Clydach and Morriston closed in 1965.

The Brynamman line was cut back to Gurnos in September 1964. Traffic from Ynyscedwyn ceased 1968 resulting in closure of the line north of the Imperial Smelting Works at Llansamlet, and the entire Llansamlet line closed in 1971.

Traffic to Llansamlet itself ceased in 1973; the Llansamlet line was closed formally in September 1982, having been dormant for many years. The entire line closed formally on 24 May 1983 and SVR ceased to be a commercial railway.

== Heritage railway ==
After closure, a heritage group named the Swansea Vale Railway Society, leased a section of track between Upper Bank and Six Pit; in 2007 the lease expired, and the group merged with the Gwili Railway in Carmarthen, and moved most of their rolling stock there.

== Topography ==
=== Main line ===
- Swansea; opened 21 February 1860; known as Swansea St Thomas from about 1887; closed 25 September 1950;
- Upper Bank; opened 1 September 1863; closed 25 September 1950; divergence of Morriston Loop;
- Six Pit Junction;
- Llansamlet; opened 21 February 1860; closed 1 March 1875;
- Birchgrove; opened 5 May 1866, trains called on Saturdays only; closed 1 March 1875
- Glais; opened 21 February 1860; closed 1 March 1875 on opening of Morriston Loop;
- Glais Junction; convergence of Morriston Loop;
- Pontardawe; opened 21 February 1860; closed 25 September 1950;
- Ynysygeinon; opened 21 January 1861; closed February 1862;
- Ynysygeinon Junction;
- Ystalyfera; opened 20 November 1861; closed 25 September 1950;
- Gurnos Junction;
- Cwmtwrch Well Halt; opened 14 December 1935; closed 25 September 1950;
- Gwys; opened 2 March 1868; closed 25 September 1950;
- Caelliau branch junction;
- Gwaun-cae-Gurwen Colliers' Platform; opened 7 December 1896; renamed Cwmllynfell 1 July 1909; closed 25 September 1950;
- Brynamman; opened 2 March 1868; renamed Brynamman East 1 January 1950; closed 25 September 1950.

The Llanelly Railway station had opened on 20 March 1865; renamed Brynamman West 1950; closed 18 August 1958.

=== Morriston loop ===
- Upper Bank; above;
- Morriston; opened 2 March 1871; relocated 1 March 1875; renamed Morriston East January 1950; closed 25 September 1950;
- Cwm Clydach; opened 1 March 1875; renamed Clydach on Tawe 1 November 1901; renamed Clydach on Tawe South January 1950; closed 25 September 1950;
- Glais; second station; opened March 1875; closed 25 September 1950;
- Glais Junction; above.
